= Gandhi Chowk, Madhwapur =

Gandhi memorial chowk

Gandhi Chowk
- गांधी चौक (Maithili)
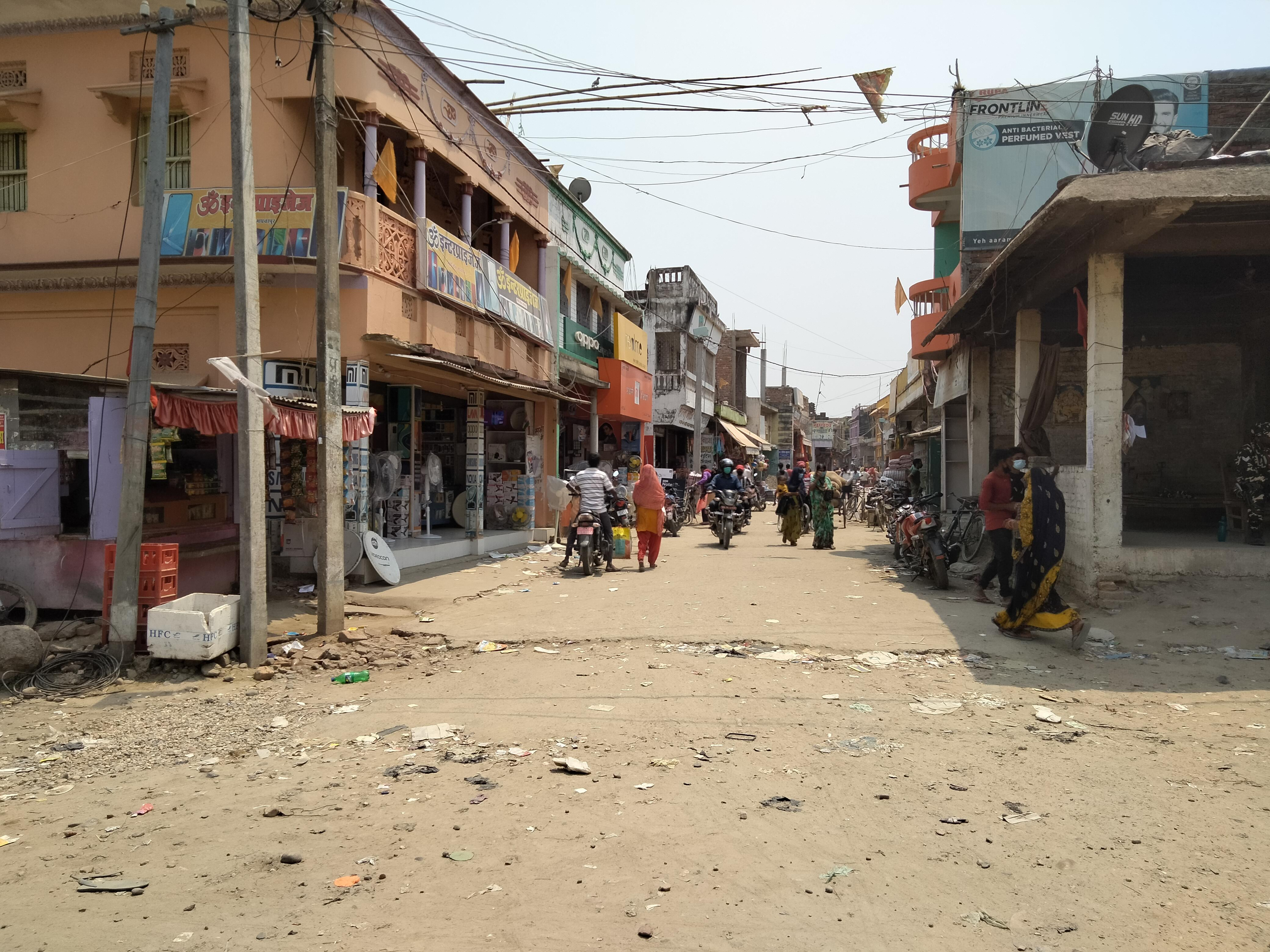
- View of India side at Gandhi Chowk in Madhwapur at Indo - Nepal International Border line
- Interactive map of Gandhi Chowk
- 26.6088569°N 85.8493865°E
- Location: India, Border Pillar Number - 295/2, Indo - Nepal Border, Madhwapur, Madhubani, Bihar

History
- Founded: After Independence of India
- Built for: Memorial of the Father of Nation, Mahatma Gandhi

Gandhi Chowk (Maithili: गांधी चौक) is an Indian border location near the Indo-Nepal International border line at Madhwapur - Matihani group village in the Mithila region of the Indian subcontinent. It is a memorial chowk in the name of Mahatma Gandhi. It is the last location of the Indian lands near the international border, after that in the north direction the lands of Nepalese territory begins. It is located near the border pillar number 295/2. The Gandhi Chowk was established after the independence of India. A statue of the Father of the Nation, Mahatma Gandhi was installed on the government land next to the India-Nepal border by the joint efforts of the freedom fighters, public representatives and social workers.

== Description ==
The Gandhi Chowk serves as a major landmark near the Dasgaja strip (No man's land) of the Indo-Nepal International border line where the citizens of the both countries cross the border freely. There is open border policy between the two nations of India and Nepal there. But due to the open border policy between the two nations, the location is sometimes also used by other third countries foreign nationals for illegal crossing of the border. Therefore the Union Government of India has deployed some SSB soldiers near the location of the Gandhi Chowk for the border security and the prevention of the illegal crossing of the other third countries foreign nationals arrived in the both nations.

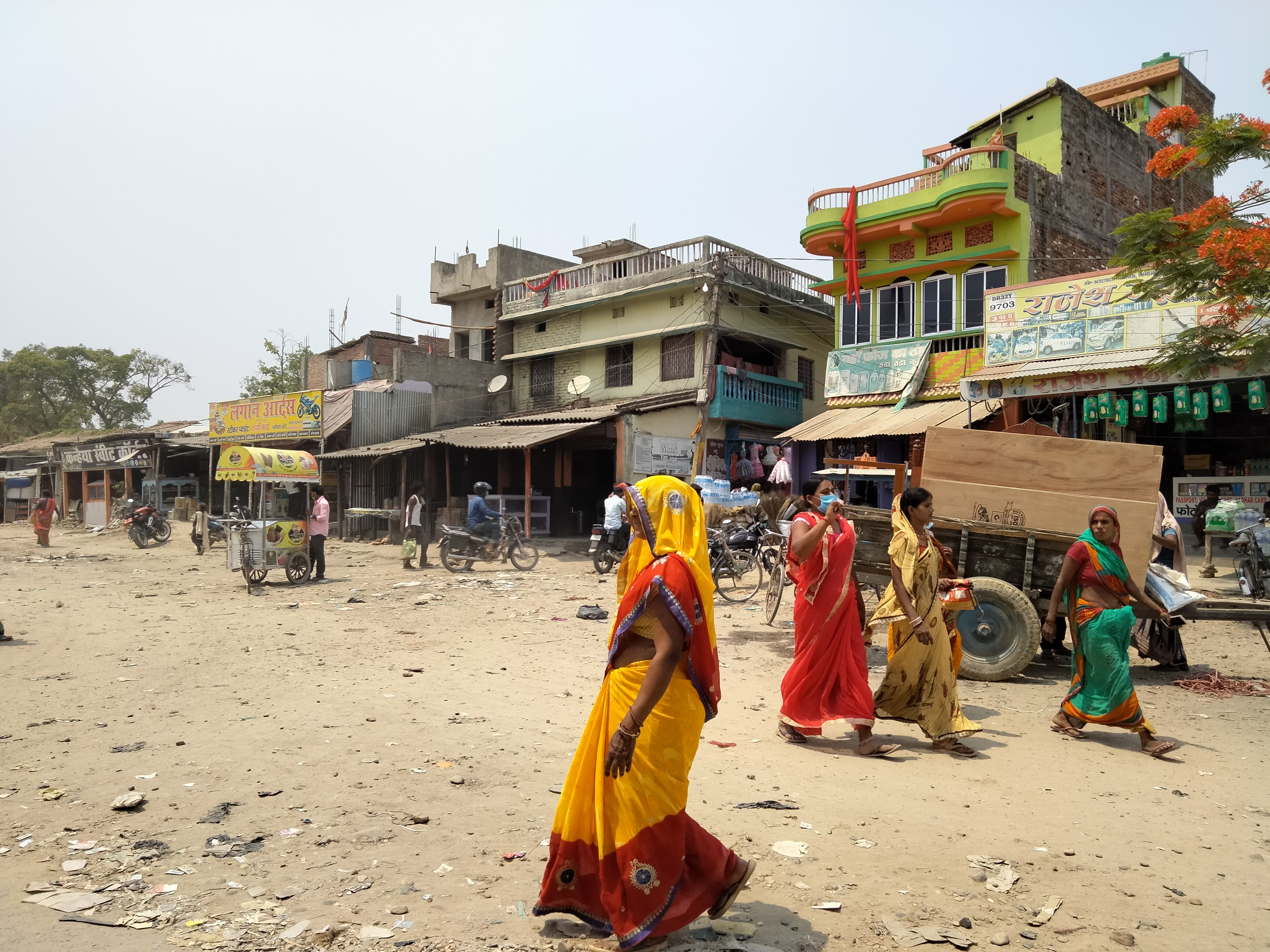
View of Nepal side (Matihani) at the Gandhi Chowk

The vicinity of the Gandhi Chowk is a prime location for the market area in the Madhwapur - Matihani group village. There are several commercial shops and commodities trading centres near the Gandhi Chowk. During business hours, the Dasgaja road passing through the chowk are often encroached with setting up selling products on the road by the local businessmen and consequently huge crowds of customers, buyers and traders are observed near the border line. This leads traffic jams there.

The campus of the Madhwapur police station is also located near the Gandhi Chowk to maintain law and order in the region of the Madhwapur Thana. Similarly, beside the police station, there is a British era's sub post office of the Madhwapur block. The historical sub post office is gradually converting into a ruins due to the negligence of the government officials. The sacred Uttarvahini bank of the Dhouns river is situated at a distance of only 200 metres in the north-east direction from the location of Gandhi Chowk. Similarly the historical and sacred religious destination Parikrama Gachhi of Matihani is located at a distance of 900 metres in the west direction from the Gandhi Chowk.

== Gandhi memorial building and statue ==
The statue of Mahatma Gandhi installed at the chowk broke up over a time and fell down. In 1985, after the statue of the Father of Nation Mahatma Gandhi installed was broken, then construction of a memorial building began at the chowk. But due to the negligence of the government officials and the local public representatives, the construction of the memorial building is still incomplete. Since then till today the statue of Mahatma Gandhi has not been installed in the memorial building.

Nowadays, the memorial building has come under the grip of encroachers. The half made memorial building has been encroached by local businessmen upon which the they have set up shops of tobacco, fruits and eggs there. It is also used as rest destination by the SSB soldiers deployed at the border for the security, during their duty hours. The local MPs and MLAs have several times promised to complete the incomplete construction of the memorial building and installation of the statue, but still the Gandhi statue has not been installed in the said memorial building. The local Gandhians have been disappointed to see the half-constructed Gandhi memorial building. The condition of the memorial place associated with the name of the Father of the Nation, Mahatma Gandhi, has become pathetic. The Gandhians here have raised their voices to remove the plight of the memorial site of Mahatma Gandhi and demanded the installation of Mahatma Gandhi's statue.
