= Dakshineswar Nath Mahadev Mandir =

Lord Shiva temple in Mithila from Satya Yuga

Religion
- Affiliation: Hinduism, Sanatana Dharma
- District: Madhubani
- Deity: Shiva
- Festival: Jalabhishek

Location
- Location: Uttra, Madhwapur Block, Mithila region
- State: Bihar
- Country: India
- Interactive map of Dakshineswar Nath Mahadev Mandir

Architecture
- Architect: Hinduism
- Founder: Daksh Prajapati
- Established: Satya Yuga

Dakshineswar Nath Mahadev Mandir is a historical and an ancient Hindu temple in the Mithila region of the Indian state of Bihar, in Madhubani district at Uttra village in Madhwapur block. It is believed that the ancient Vedic King Daksha Prajapati in Satya Yuga came here to worship the god. This temple is also known as Daksheshwar Nath Mahadev Mandir. The upbhransh word of Daksheshwar is now a day is Dakshineswar. So present time this temple is known as Dakshineswar Nath Mahadev Mandir.

== Description ==
At this Shiva temple, there is a special tradition that after Jalabhishek, it is customary to offer heads of paddy bushes and rice flour roti on the Shivling. According to the sanyashi Bakhat Giri, this tradition is practiced from his 8th generation clans before him. Some of them are Kishori Giri, Ramchandra Giri, Shambhu Giri, Biltu Giri, Saroj Giri, Sanjay Giri and more. It is believed that the devotees who offer rice and rice flour roti with devotion to the Shivling of the temple, his descendants never lack money, food, happiness and prosperity. Rather, it maintains happiness and prosperity throughout the region. Every year local people of the area fill holy water from Dhouns river near Pehwada and do Jalabhishek on the Shivling of the temple. This temple is very famous for Mahashivratri festival celebrated on the occasion of the anniversary of the marriage of the Lord Shiva and the Goddess Parvati. It is also very famous for Narak Niwaran Chaturdashi festival of Lord Shiva.

There is a sacred pond known as Gangjali Pokhair on the south side adjacent to the temple. Its water is also used as Achhinjal by devotees to offer Jalabhisheka on the Shivalinga of the Baba Dakshineshwar Nath Mahadev. In the campus of the temple, a cultural fair is organised twice a year with great pomp and show on the occasion of Narak Nivaran Chaturdashi in the month of Magh and on Mahashivratri in the month of Phalgun.
