= Narmadeshwar Nath Mahadev Mandir =

Shiva temple in Mithila

- नर्मदेश्वर नाथ महादेव मंदिर
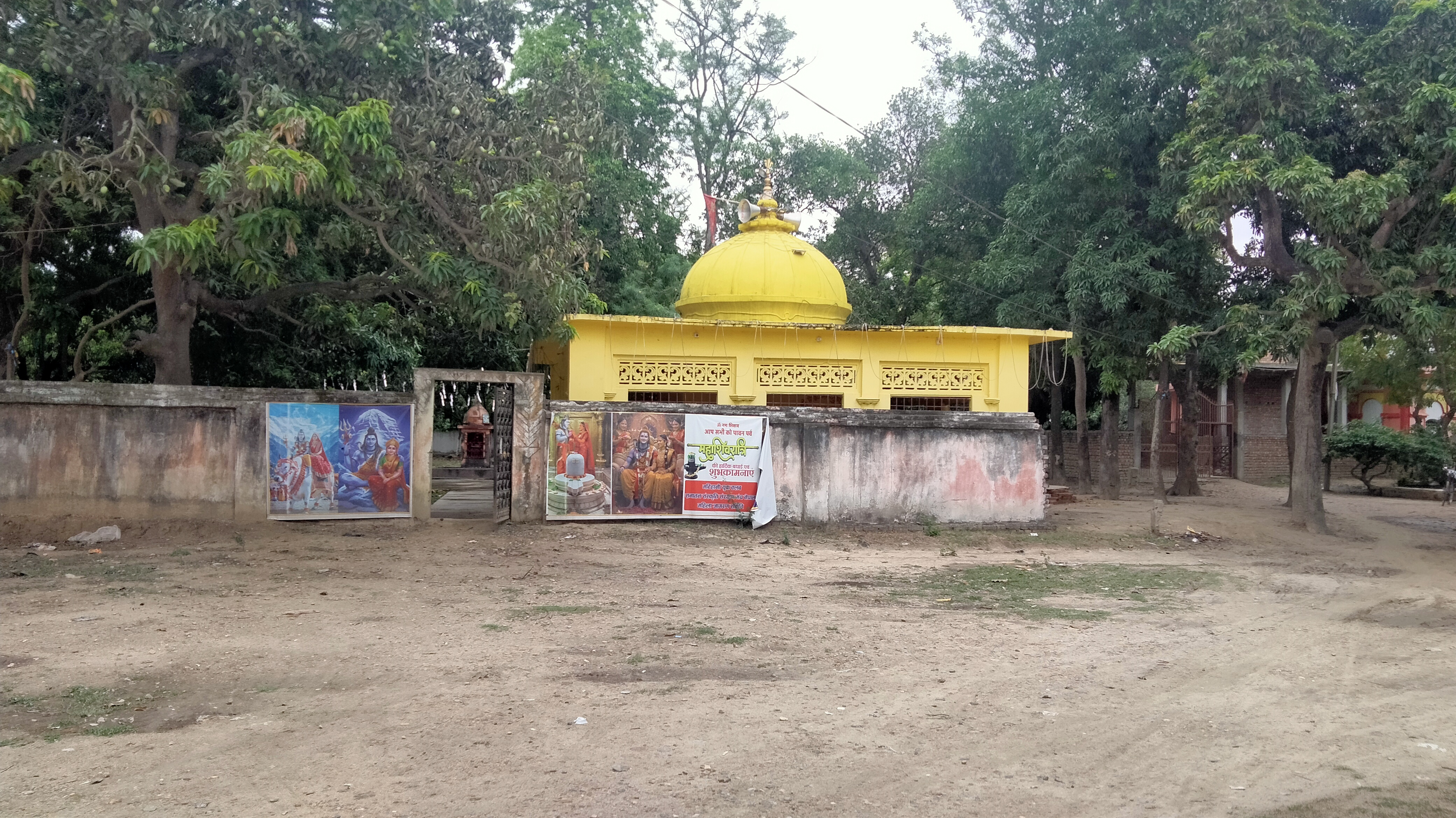
- Narmadeshwar Nath Mahadev Mandir in Madhwapur town

Religion
- Affiliation: Hinduism
- District: Madhubani district
- Deity: Lord Shiva
- Festivals: Sawan Sombari, Mahashivratri

Location
- Location: Madhwapur town
- State: Bihar
- Country: India
- Also known as Narvadeshwar Nath Mahadev Mandir

Narmadeshwar Nath Mahadev Mandir (Maithili: नर्मदेश्वर नाथ महादेव मंदिर) is a Hindu temple dedicated to Lord Shiva in the Mithila region. It is located in the Madhwapur town of the Madhubani district in Bihar. It is a popular destination for the sacred Jalabhisheka ritual in Hinduism on Shivalinga during the Sawan Sombari festival. The other major festival of the temple is Mahashivratri. The temple is also called as Narvadeshwar Nath Mahadev Mandir.

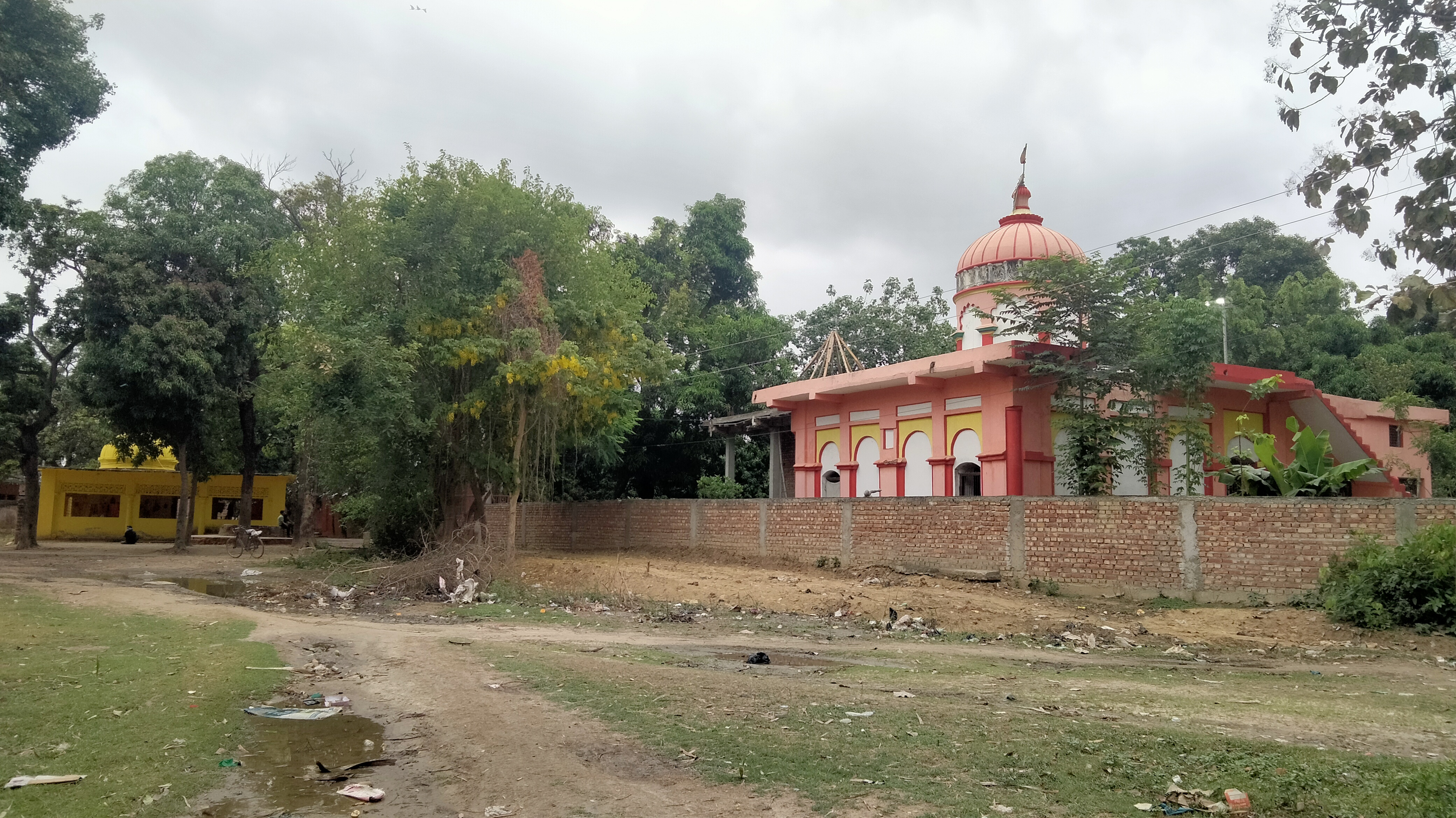
View of the campus of Narmadeshwar Nath Mahadev Mandir

== Description ==
The Narmadeshwar Nath Mahadev Mandir is located on the bank of the sacred Dhouns River near the Bharat - Nepal Maitri Chhath Ghat. During the festival of Sawan Sombari, thousands of devotees carry the holy water from the sacred Uttarvahini flow of the Dhouns river located in Matihani of the neighboring country Nepal and perform the sacred Jalabhisheka ritual on the Shivalinga of the temple. They chant the holy slogans like "Bol Bam" and "Har Har Mahadev" during the journey between the sacred river and the temple.

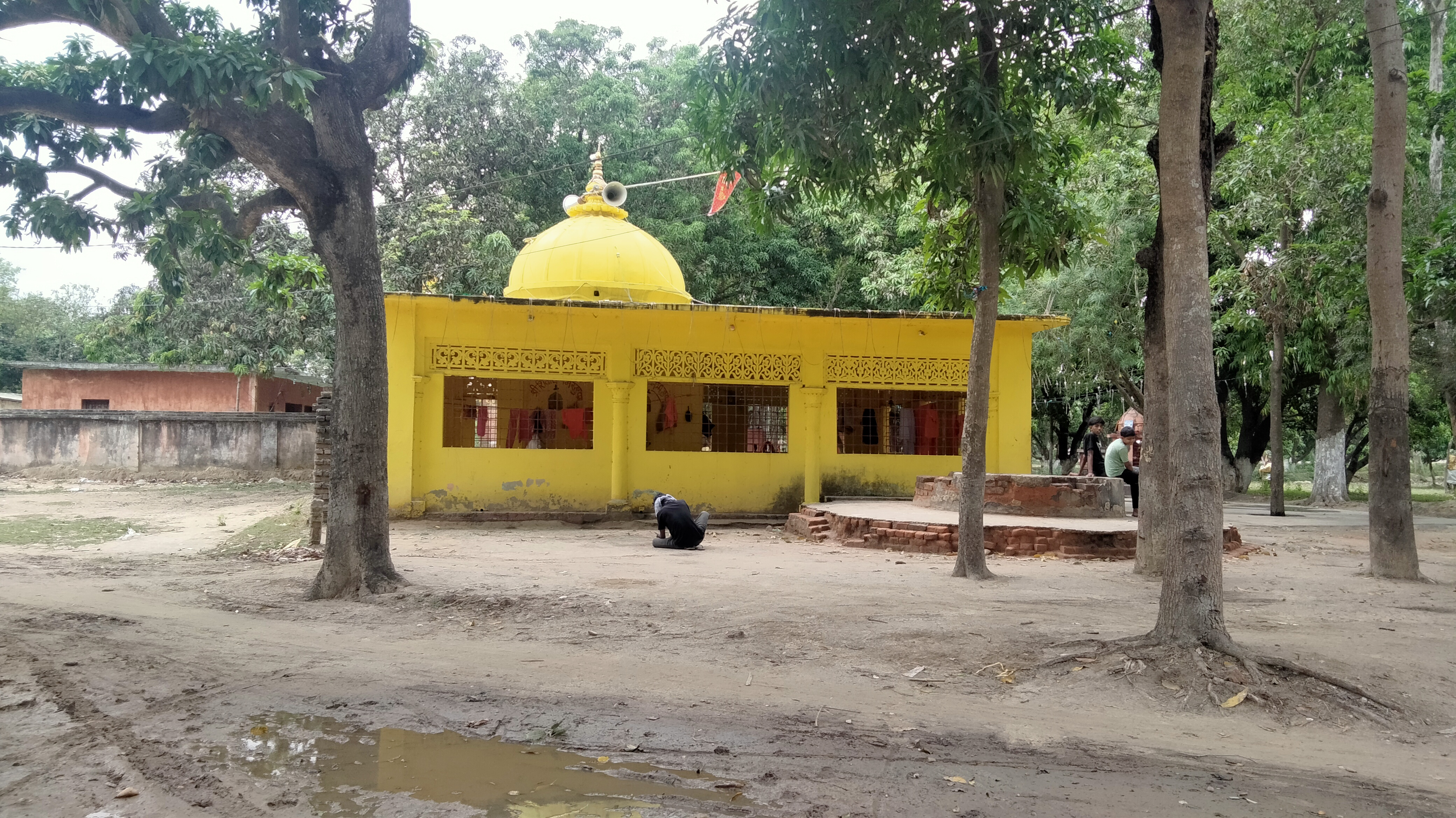
View of the Narmadeshwar Nath Mahadev Mandir from other side

During the British rule in India, the temple served as a refuge centre for the freedom fighters of the region.
