= Parikrama Gachhi =

Historical mango woodlands in the Mithila region

- परिक्रमा गाछी

Religion
- Affiliation: Hinduism
- District: Mahottari and Madhubani
- Deity: Lord Rama and Goddess Sita
- Festival: Mithila Madhya Parikrama

Location
- Location: Indo-Nepal International border line (Dasgaja), Madhwapur - Matihani border
- State: Bihar and Madhesh Pradesh
- Country: India and Nepal
- Interactive map of Parikrama Gachhi
- Coordinates: 26.6106160°N 85.8407545°E
- Major destination for the Mithila Madhya Parikrama

Parikrama Gachhi (Maithili: परिक्रमा गाछी) is a historical woodlands or trees garden of mango trees near the line of Indo-Nepal International border in the Madhwapur-Matihani group village.

It is the historical place where the fair known as Parikrama Mela of the Mithila Madhya Parikrama is held in the town of Matihani in the Himalayan nation of Nepal. It is one of the fifteen major sacred destinations in the spiritual journey of the Mithila Madhya Parikrama between the two culturally tied nations India and Nepal in the subcontinent. There are some historical temples known as Ragho Baba Mandir, Raktamala Mai Mandir and Khabas Mandir located at the Parikrama Gachhi.

== Description ==
During the journey of the Mithila Madhya Parikrama, the Parikrama Gachhi is the next destination after the destination of Girija Sthan in Phulhar. The processions of the devotees in the journey arrive at the Parikrama Gachhi carrying the decorated sedans of Mithila Bihari and Kishoriji. The crowd of pilgrims reach the Parikrama Gachi of Matihani via Mukhiyapatti, Musharaniyan, Tulsiahi and Rampur, singing kirtan and bhajans with great pomp and show. Around six lakh devotees from the border region come to visit the Parikrama Mela and offer prayers to Mithila Bihari and Kishoriji and receive blessings. Kirtan-bhajan, Ramleela, Raasleela, tableaus based on Lord Rama and Goddess Sita, dance shows etc. are organized by the pilgrims at dozens of places throughout the Parikrama Gachhi in the Parikrama Mela. Devotees visit to the temples of Ragho Baba, Raktamala Mai and their Khabas located in the Parikrama Gachi to seek blessings. During the Parikrama Mela, the local police personnel of Madhwapur and Matihani police stations maintain law and order. Similarly the SSB personnel of India and APF personnel of Nepal are deployed for patrolling the dasgaja (no man's land) near the fair ground.

Similarly during the occasion of the Dussehra festival, devotees take out palanquin procession of Goddess Janaki and Lord Lakshmi Narayan with elephants, horses and musical instruments, starting from Matihani Math, passing through various religious places, the palanquin circumambulates the city of Madhwapur - Matihani reaches Ragho Baba Mandir at the Parikrama Gachhi. There they worship Goddess Janaki and Lord Lakshmi Narayan and finally the palanquin procession ends again at Matihani Math.
