= Vishnu Statue, Bairwa, Madhwapur =

Statue in Madhwapur, Madhubani

Vishnu Statue, Bairwa
- Year: Karnat Dynasty (13th - 14th centuries)
- Subject: Vishnu
- Dimensions: 69 cm cm × 158 cm cm ( ×)
- Weight: 5 Quintal
- Location: Bairwa Village, Madhwapur

The Vishnu Statue in Bairwa is an ancient statue of Vishnu.

== History ==
The statue was found under the farm of a former mukhiya Mohammad Latif Rain at Bairwa village of Madhwapur block in Madhubani district of the Indian state of Bihar on 19 March 2021.

== Statue ==
According to Chandraprakash, a technical assistant of Maharajadhiraj Laxmishwar Singh Museum located in Darbhanga, it is an ashtadhatu black figure. The weight is around 5 quintals. It is 158 cm in length and 69 cm in width. According to archeologist Sushant Kumar of the museum the statue was made around 13th-14th centuries, possibly in the period between Karnat dynasty and Oiniwar dynasty of Mithila. It seems that the village must be of Vishnu worshipers during the time of the Karnatak dynasty in Mithila. President Shiv Kumar Mishra of Maharajadhiraj Laxmishwar Singh Museum urged the district administration and the people of the society to keep the idol in the museum in view of the safety of the ancient idol but the people of the village refused to keep the statue in the museum. The villagers assured to build a temple of Vishnu and keep the statue safe in the temple. In consultation with Dr. Shiv Kumar Mishra, the Madhwapur police station in-charge took written undertaking from the villagers to guarantee the safety of the idol and informed the Madhubani district administration.
