= Pirokhar =

Village in Madhubani district, Bihar

- Village
- Interactive map of Pirokhar
- Coordinates: 26.5170497°N 85.8419812°E
- Country: India
- State: Bihar
- Region: Mithila region
- District: Madhubani
- Block: Madhwapur

Area
  - Total: 5.07 km^{2} (1.96 sq mi)

Population (2011)
  - Total: 6,397
- Demonym: Maithil

Language
  - Official: Hindi

Regional languages
  - Mother tongue: Ancient: Maithili; Sanskrit
- Time zone: UTC+5:30 (IST)
- Postal code: 843319

Pirokhar is a village located in the Madhwapur Block of the Madhubani district in Bihar, India. It is administered under the Pirokhar Gram Panchayat and forms part of the Madhwapur Block.

== Geography ==
According to the land records of the Government of India, Pirokhar covers an area of approximately 507 hectares (5.07 km²).

== Demographics ==
As per the 2011 Census of India, Pirokhar has a total population of 6,397, including 3,379 males and 3,018 females, living in 1,471 households.

The literacy rate includes 3,303 literate individuals. Scheduled Caste and Scheduled Tribe populations are also present in the village.

== Education ==
Educational institutions in the village include:

- P.S. Mushari Pirokhar, a primary school.
- U.M.S. Pirokhar, an upper middle school.

== Administration ==
Pirokhar is governed by the Gram Panchayat under the Madhwapur Community Development Block. It falls under the Harlakhi Vidhan Sabha constituency and the Madhubani Lok Sabha constituency.

== Connectivity ==
=== Road ===
The village is connected to nearby towns such as Madhwapur and Basopatti through rural and district roads.

=== Rail ===
The nearest railway station is:

- Janakpur Road railway station, approximately 10 km away.

=== Air ===
Nearby airports include:

- Darbhanga Airport – approximately 70–75 km
- Patna Airport – approximately 180 km

== Culture ==
The village follows traditional Maithili cultural practices. Major festivals such as Chhath, Durga Puja, Sama Chakeva, and Holi are widely celebrated in the Mithila region. Maithili and Hindi are the primary languages spoken by residents.

== Postal services ==
The postal PIN code of Pirokhar is 843319.

== Places to visit nearby ==
=== Punaura Dham (Janaki Janmasthali) ===
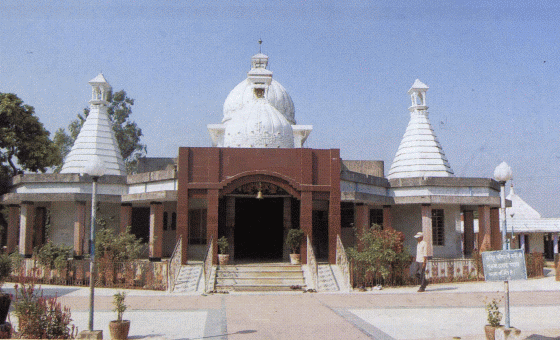
Older view of Punaura Dham, Sitamarhi

Punaura Dham (also locally known as Purodhan or Puronara Dhan) is a major Hindu pilgrimage site located in Sitamarhi district. It is regarded as the birthplace of Goddess Sita, where she is believed to have emerged from the earth during King Janaka’s ploughing.

The site includes the Janaki Janmasthali Temple and Janaki Kund and is an important part of the Ramayana Circuit of Bihar.

- Located approximately 30–35 km (by road) from the Pirokhar region.
- Major attractions include the Janaki Janmasthali Temple and Janaki Kund.
- Forms part of the official *Ramayana Circuit* of Bihar.

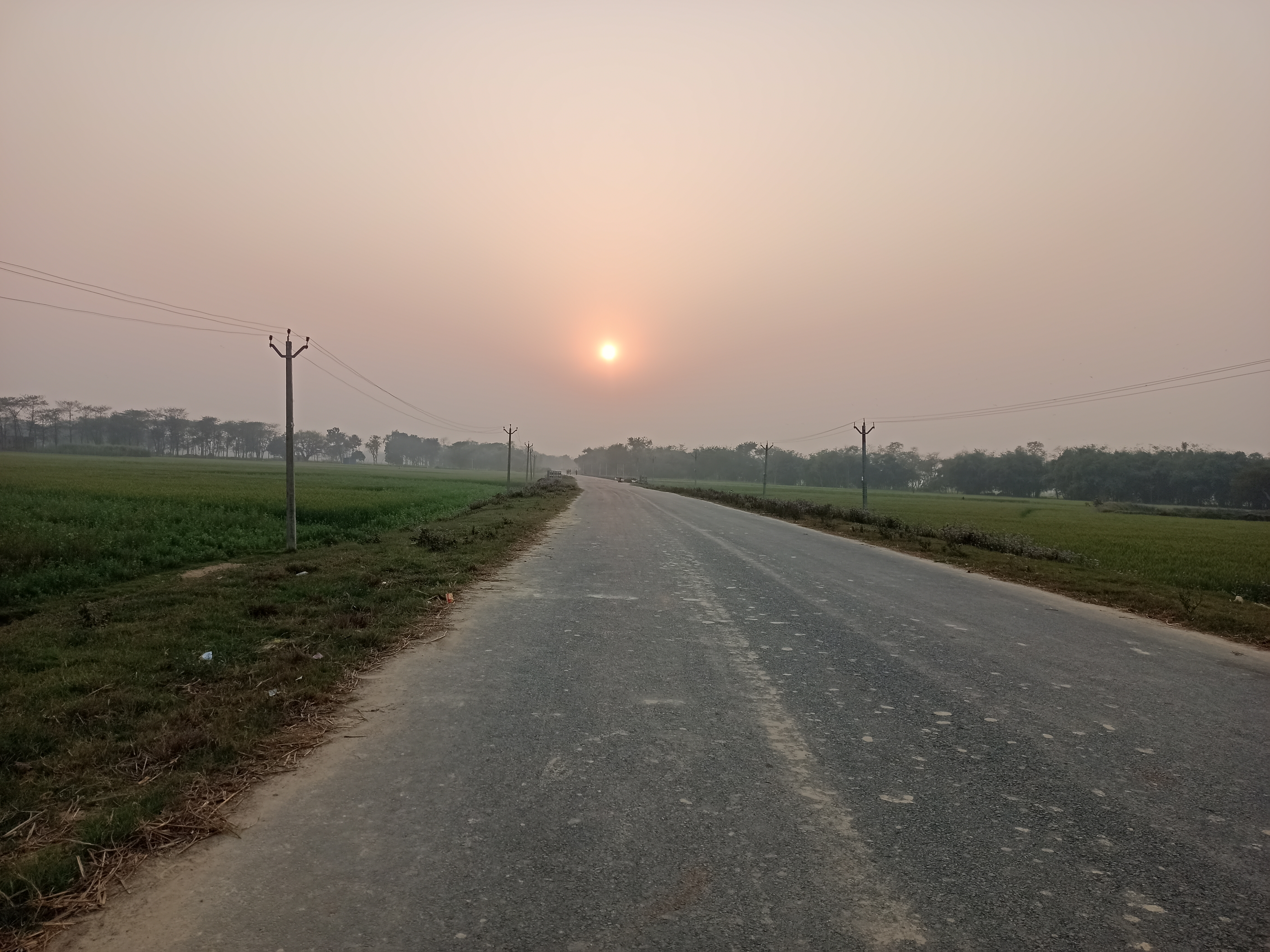
Indo–Nepal Border Road (representative view of a national/state highway in North Bihar).

== Climate ==
Pirokhar has a humid subtropical climate with hot summers, a strong monsoon season, and mild winters.

Climate data for Pirokhar (Madhubani district)
Month	Jan	Feb	Mar	Apr	May	Jun	Jul	Aug	Sep	Oct	Nov	Dec	Year
Mean daily maximum °C	22	26	32	37	38	35	32	31	31	30	27	23	30
Mean daily minimum °C	9	12	17	22	26	27	26	26	25	20	14	10	20
Average rainfall mm	13	20	8	6	41	176	293	285	195	43	4	6	1,090
Mean daily maximum °F	72	79	90	99	100	95	90	88	88	86	81	73	87
Mean daily minimum °F	48	54	63	72	79	81	79	79	77	68	57	50	67
Average rainfall inches	0.5	0.8	0.3	0.2	1.6	6.9	11.5	11.2	7.7	1.7	0.2	0.2	42.8

== See also ==
- Madhwapur
- Madhubani district
- Villages in Bihar
