= Bharat-Nepal Maitri Chhath Ghat =

Shared festive Chhath Ghat between India and Nepal

Bharat-Nepal Maitri Chhath Ghat भारत–नेपाल मैत्री छठ घाट Indo-Nepal Friendship Chhath Ghat
- Festive Ghat
- Country: India and Nepal
- State: Bihar and Madhesh Pradesh
- Region: Mithila
- District: Madhubani, Mahottari and Dhanusha
- Villages: Madhwapur, Rampur, Matihani, Mukhiyapatti Musharniya, Tulshiyahi
- Named for: Chhath Ghat for the friendship relation between India and Nepal

Government
  - Body: Bharat-Nepal Maitri Chhath Samiti

Dimensions
  - Length: 6 km (3.7 mi)
- Demonym: Maithil
- Friendship Chhath Ghat at Indo-Nepal Border areas

Bharat-Nepal Maitri Chhath Ghat (Maithili: भारत–नेपाल मैत्री छठ घाट) is a long Chhath Ghat located on the both side banks of the Dhouns river at the Indo-Nepal border near the Madhwapur-Matihani semi towns in the Mithila region of the Indian subcontinent.

It represents a common Chhath Ghat of the citizens between the two culturally tied countries India and Nepal. Although they live in different countries, citizens of the both nations (Nepal and India) have constructed a shared Chhath Ghat on the both sides banks of the Dhouns river at the Madhwapur-Matihani Border, as they share the same religion, culture, festivals, marital traditions, and joys and even sorrows. It is also repaired every year before the occasion of the Chhath festival.

== Etymology ==
The English translation of "Bharat-Nepal Maitri Chhath Ghat" is "Indo-Nepal Friendship Chhath Ghat". The term "Maitri" signifies to the message of further strengthen the centuries-old Beti-Roti (translation: Daughter-Bread) relationship between the two nations.

== Description ==
Bharat-Nepal Maitri Chhath Ghat is a famous Chhath Ghat in the Mithila region of the subcontinent. It is located at the Indo-Nepal International borderline near the Madhwapur-Matihani semi towns of the region. It stretched for about six kms on both banks of the Dhouns river.

During the Chhath festival, a huge number of Chhath Vrati from the both countries India and Nepal take holy bathes in the Dhouns river and offer Arghya of faith to the setting and the rising sun. On the one side of the river Indian devotees and on the other side of the river Nepalese devotees offer the Arghya of faith. Devotees from Madhwapur, Rampur and Virit villages in the Indian border areas and similarly from Matihani, Tulshiyahi, Musaharniya in the Nepalese border areas majorly come here to celebrate the Chhath festival together staying at the same ghat on both sides of the river. In Nepal the Dhouns river is also called as Bigghi or Bigahi or Bagahi river. It is a major joint Chhath Puja Ghat constructed between India and Nepal for organizing and celebrating a common cultural festival between the two nations. The citizens of the two nations jointly come at the ghat to celebrate their common festival of Chhath Puja at its common river Dhouns.

During the festival of Chhath Puja, several attractive pandals are constructed on the both banks of the river. Around 50 thousands devotees participate the common Chhath Puja celebration on the banks of the river.
