= Uttra =

Archaeological village in Mithila

Uttra Utara
- Uttara
- Nickname: Utra
- Interactive map of Uttra
- Coordinates: 26.5170497°N 85.8419812°E
- Country: India
- State: Bihar
- Region: Mithila region
- District: Madhubani district
- Block: Madhwapur

Population (2011)
  - Total: 6,203
- Demonym: Maithil

Language
  - Official: Hindi

Local language
  - Mother language: Maithili

Uttra (also written as Uttara or Utara or Utra) is a village in the Madhwapur block of the Madhubani district in the Mithila region of Bihar in India. The mother language of the village is Maithili. It is connected by state highway SH-75 from Darbhanga to the block headquarter Madhwapur. In the village there is an ancient temple of Lord Shiva known as Dakshineswar Nath Mahadev Mandir. Similarly there is an archaeological site known as Sunphulwa in the village. The archaeological site is estimated to be of the early medieval period by the Kashi Prasad Jayaswal Research Institute in Patna.

== Demographics ==
According to the population census of 2011, the name of village is recorded as Utra. The total population of the village is 6,203. Out of the total population, 3050 are males and 3153 are females. The total number of households in the village is 1343.
