= Pancheshwar Nath Mahadev Mandir =

Lord Shiva temple in Mithila

Baba Pancheshwar Nath Mahadev Mandir
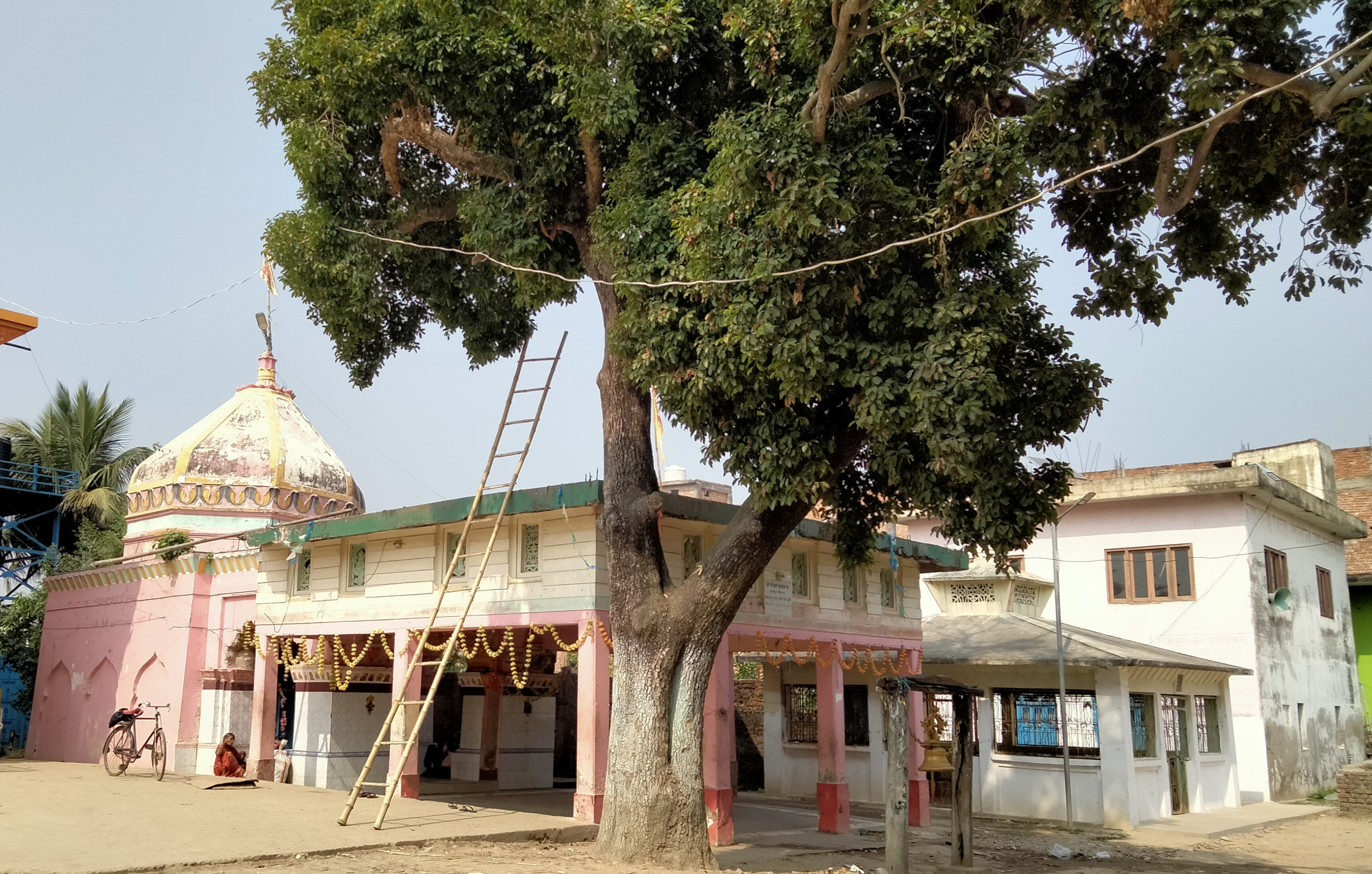
- Baba Pancheshwar Nath Mahadev Mandir, Madhwapur

Religion
- Affiliation: Hinduism
- District: Madhubani district
- Deity: Shiva
- Festivals: Mahashivratri, Narak Niwaran Chaturdashi, Ganesh Puja, Durga Puja

Location
- Location: Madhwapur, Madhubani district
- State: Bihar
- Interactive map of Baba Pancheshwar Nath Mahadev Mandir
- Coordinates: 26.6081732°N 85.8445324°E

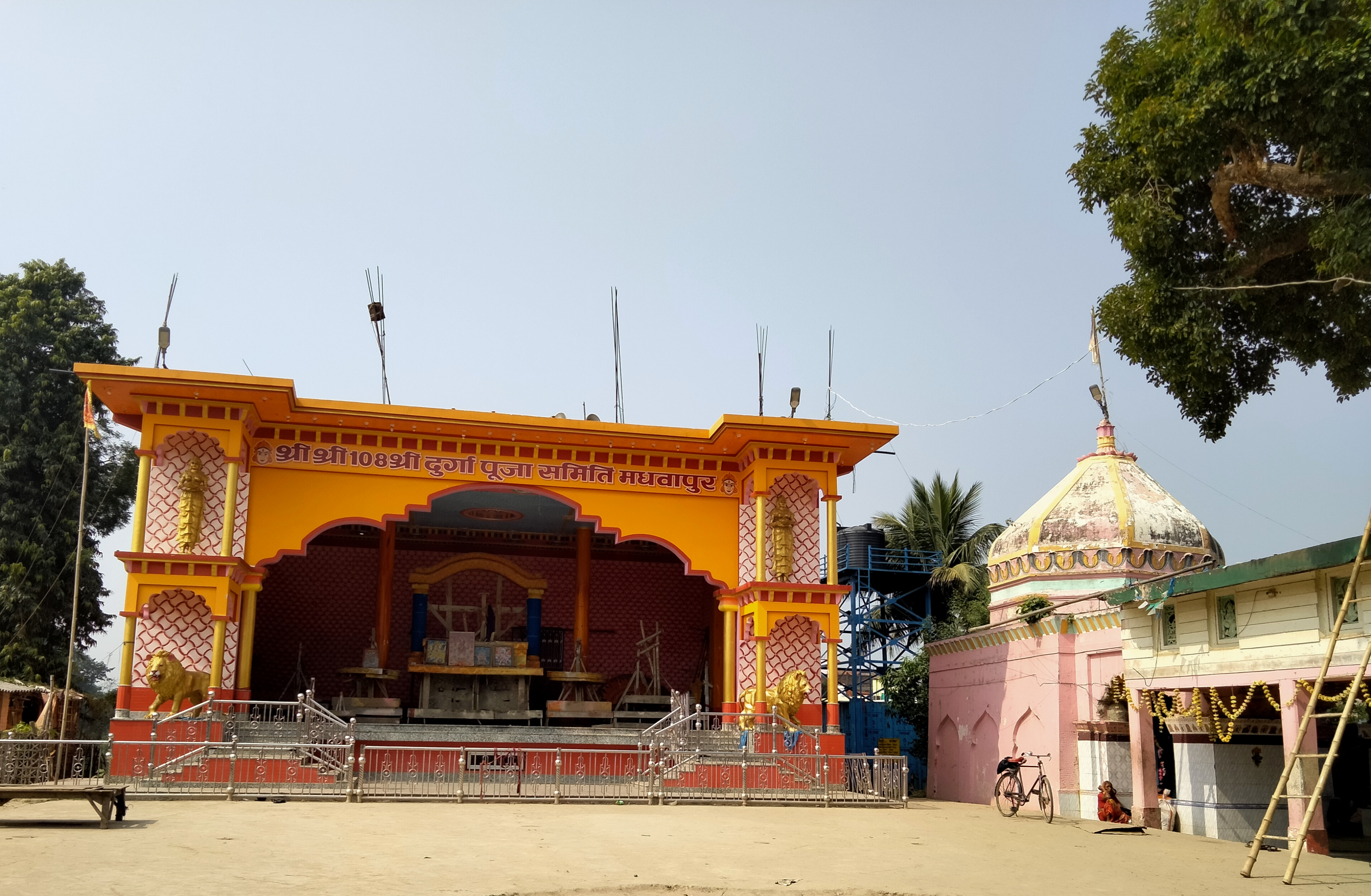
Durga Puja Mandir at Pancheshwar Nath Mahadev Mandir, Madhwapur, Madhubani district

Pancheshwar Nath Mahadev Mandir ( Also Baba Pancheshwar Nath Mahadev Mandir) is a Hindu temple of Shiva in Madhwapur block of Madhubani district in Mithila region of Bihar. An annual four day Ganesh Puja festival is organised by Ganesh Puja Samiti at the temple. An annual Durga Puja festival has been held since 1954, and is organised by Durga Puja Samiti. In the month of Sawan, local residents do Jalabhisheka (Worship of Shivlinga with sacred water) on the Shivling of the temple every Monday. The devotees of Sawan Sombari pilgrimage carry the holy water from the Uttarvahini Dhouns River at Matihani in the neighbouring country Nepal.

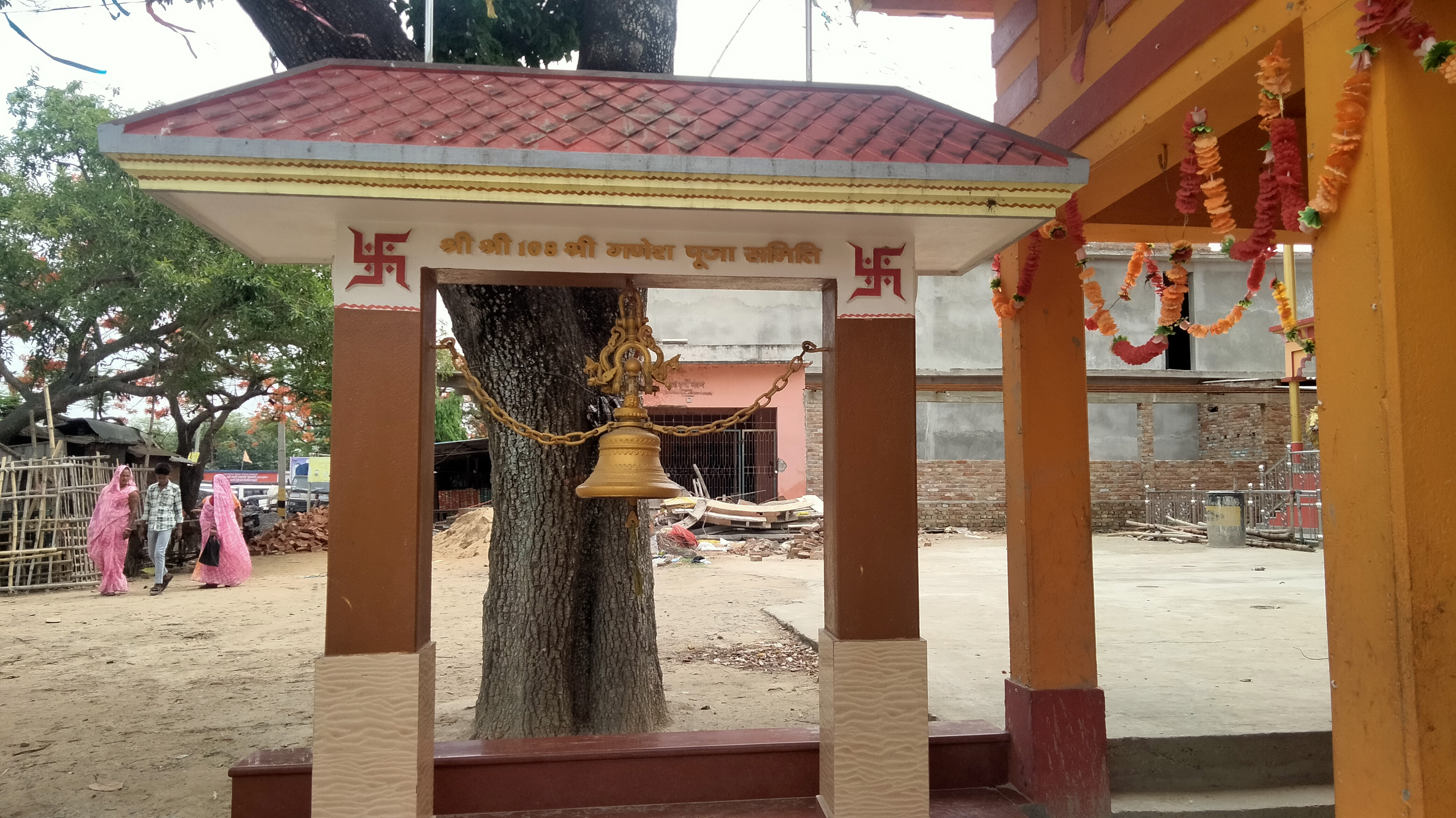
Spiritual huge bell at the entrance of the Pancheshwar Nath Mahadev Mandir

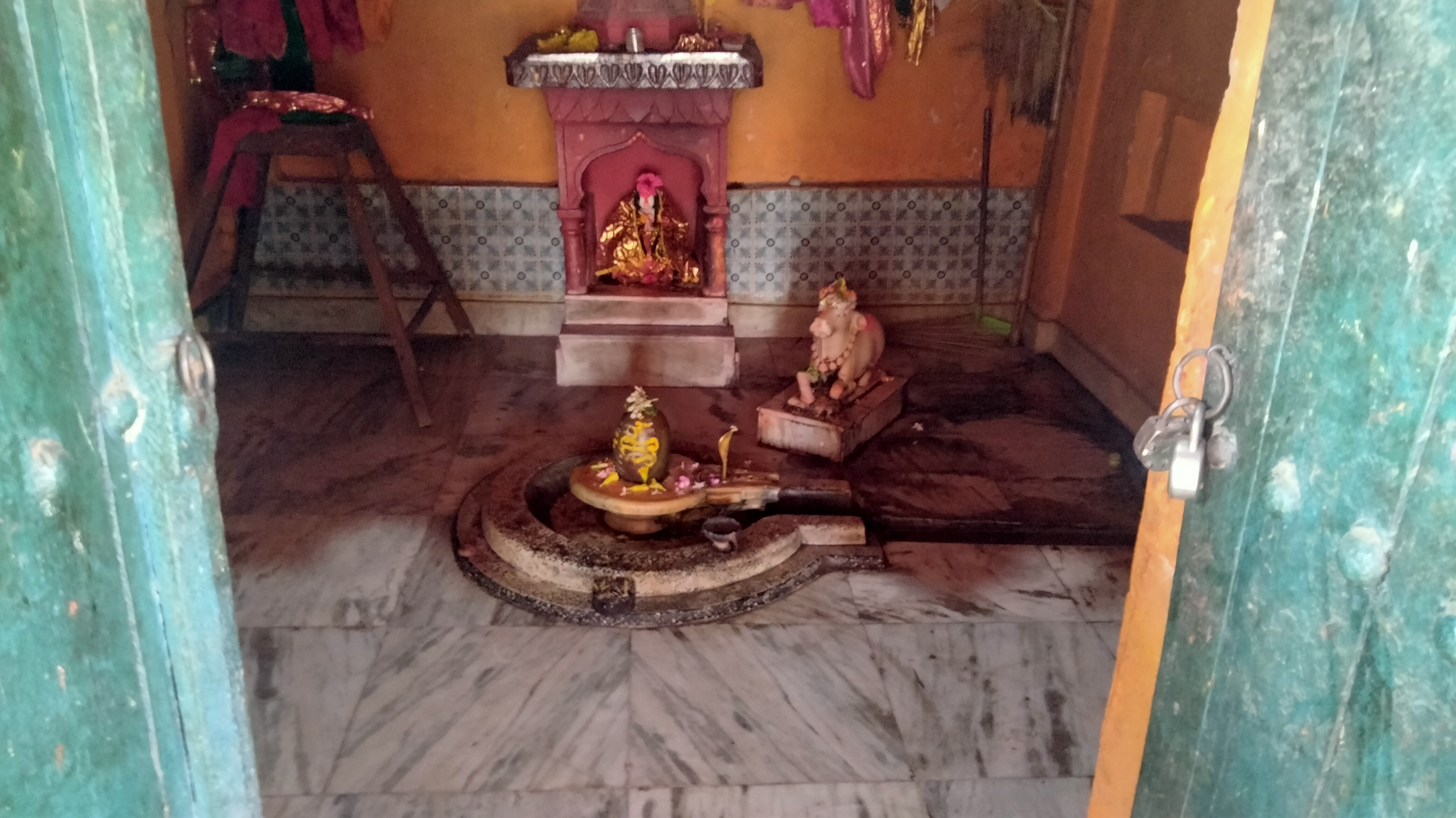
Shivalinga of Pancheshwar Nath Mahadev

== History ==
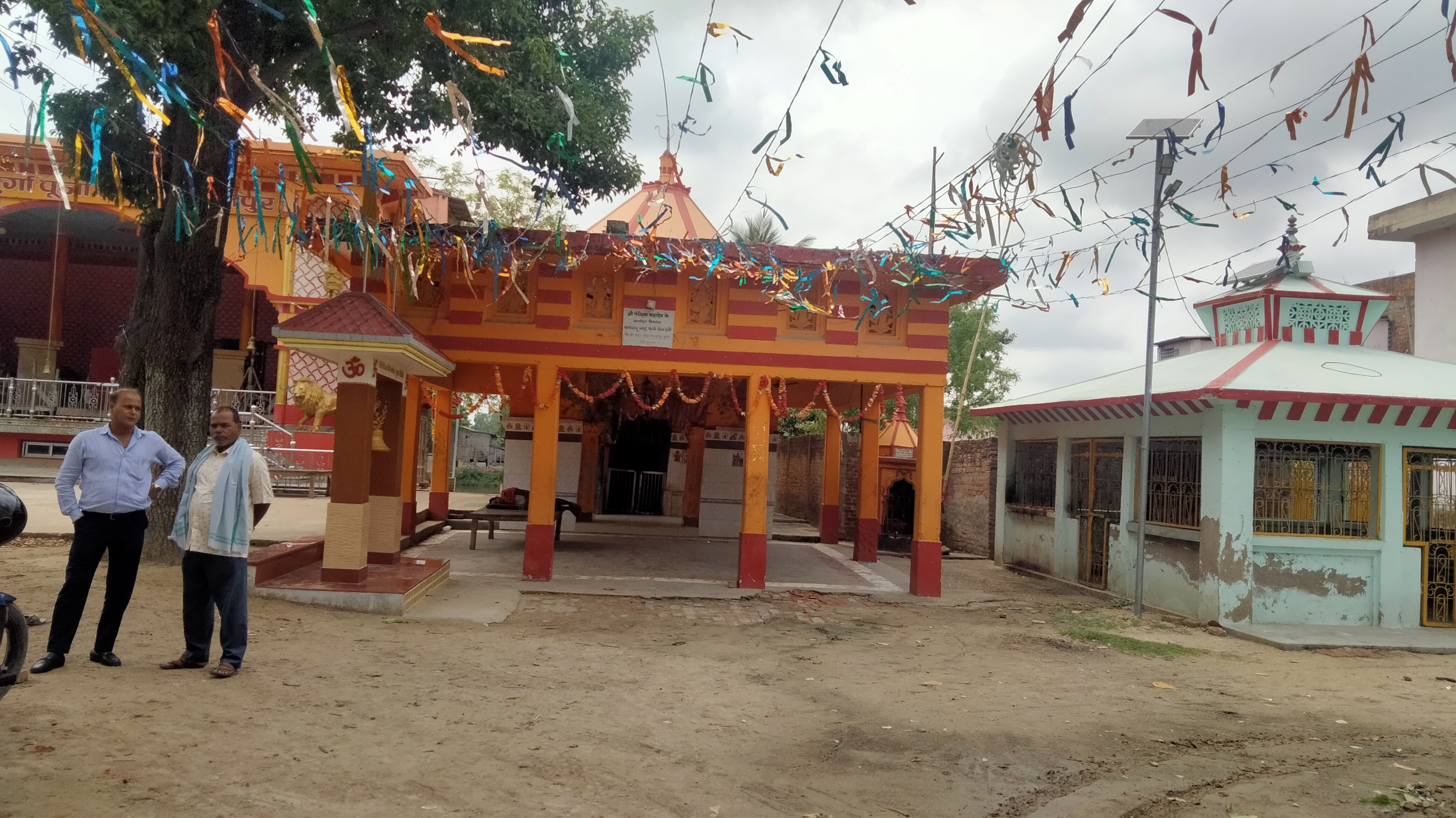
View of the temple from front side

Durga Puja is a major festival celebrated in the campus of the temple. The first Durga Puja celebration was held in the year 1952. With the help of Mahant Das of Choraut Matha and the villagers, the idol of Maa Duvrijnarayanarga was built and the worship of Maa Durga was started according to the rule and regulation of the Hindu rituals. After that, the people's faith and popularity in the Durga Puja celebration continued to increase. In the year 1956, an organisation called as Durga Puja Samiti was constituted by the villagers to organise the Durga Puja celebration with a great pomp. A separate Khaparail Bhavan was built in the campus to perform the rituals of the Durga Puja. Later the Khaparail Bhavan got destroyed over a long time period. Then in the year 2017, a grand and attractive Durga Puja Bhavan was again built with the help of the villagers.

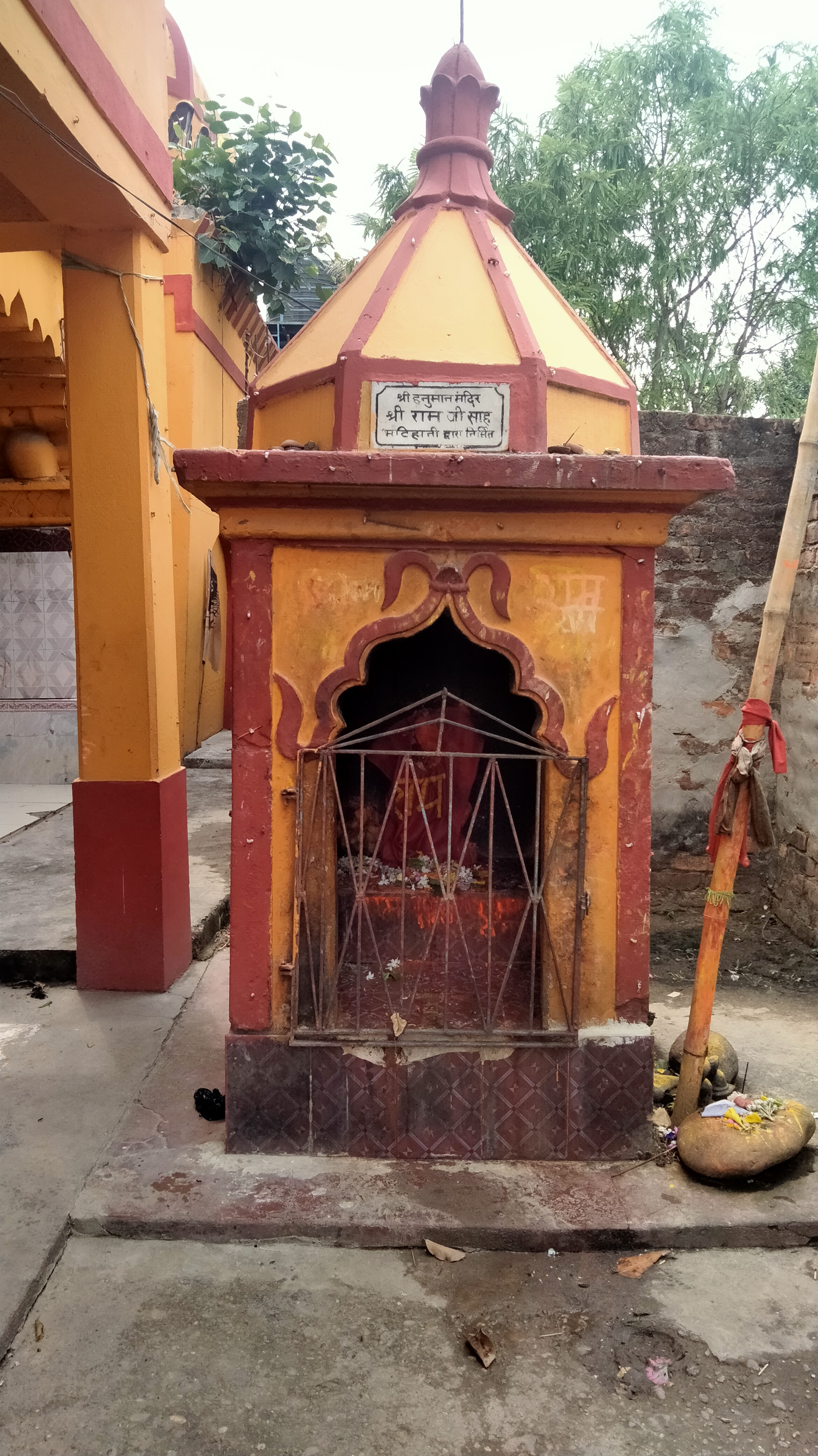
Hanuman Mandir in the campus of Pancheshwar Nath Mahadev Mandir

On 7 January 2026, the Tourism cum Art and Culture Minister Arun Shankar Prasad of the Bihar Government reached at the temple premises for worship. During his visit, the president Chetan Kumar Rashmi of the Madhwapur Chamber of Commerce, submitted a memorandum to him regarding development of the temple and its inclusion in the list of tourist destinations in the state. The minister assured to take initiative in this regard.
