= Dhouns River =

River flowing on the plains of Mithila region

Dhouns Nadi धौंस नदी
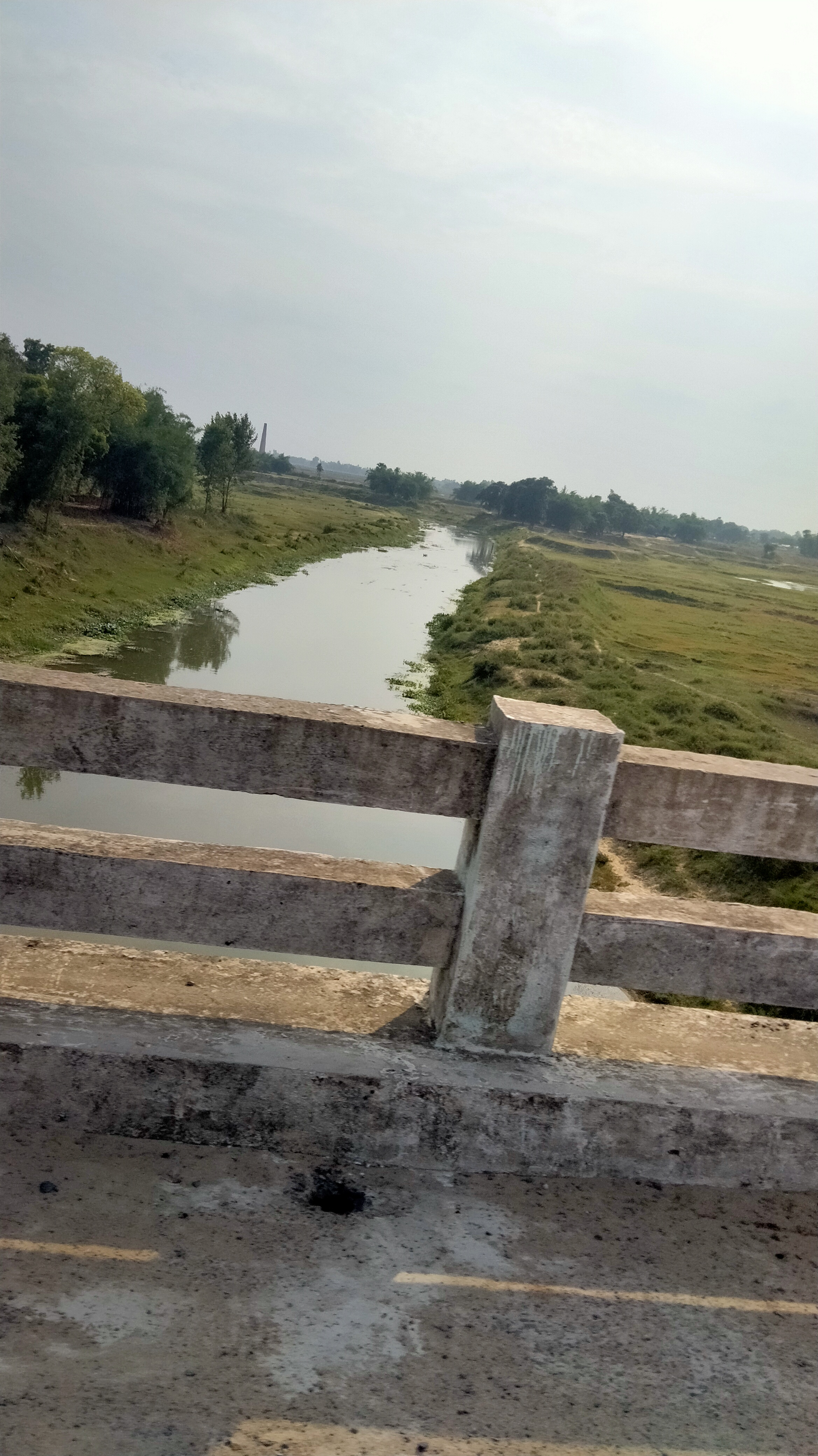
- View of Dhouns river at Basuki Bihari from a bridge

Location
- Country: India and Nepal
- State: Bihar (India) and Madhesh Pradesh (Nepal)
- Region: Mithila region
- District: Madhubani, Sitamarhi, Darbhanga, Mahottari and Dhanusha

Basin features
- River system: Adhwara

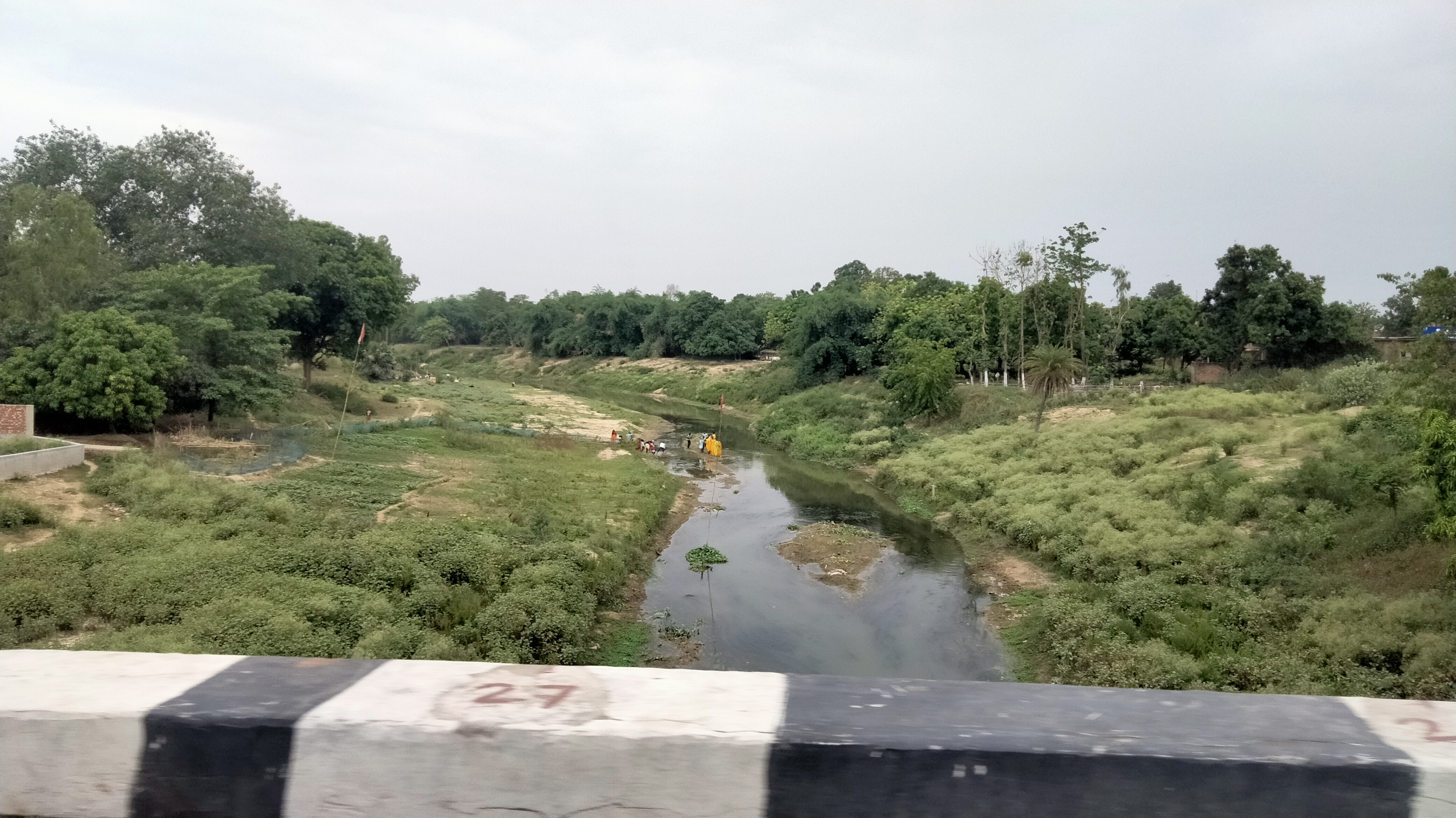
View of the Dhouns River from Saharghat Bridge

The Dhouns (Maithili: धौंस) is a river that flows on the plains of the Mithila region of Nepal and India. It is the part of Adhwara group of rivers flowing from Nepal to the western part of the Madhwapur block area in the Madhubani district of Bihar in India.

== Description ==
Dhouns river is a major river flowing on the plains of the western part of the Madhubani district in Bihar. It originates from the hills in the Terai part of Nepal. In this river, the streams of Adhwara group like Bighi, Doodhmati, Ghoghra, Hardinath, Jamuni and Thomne merge at different locations. The Dhouns river finally merges into the larger river Bagmati in the Darbhanga district of Bihar.

== Geography ==
The stream of Bigghi river approximately starts from the river at Aurahi Bridge near Mahendranagar town in the Mithila region of Nepal. The river flows towards southern plains of the Teria region. In Nepal, the stream of Bigghi river is also known as Bigghi Khola.

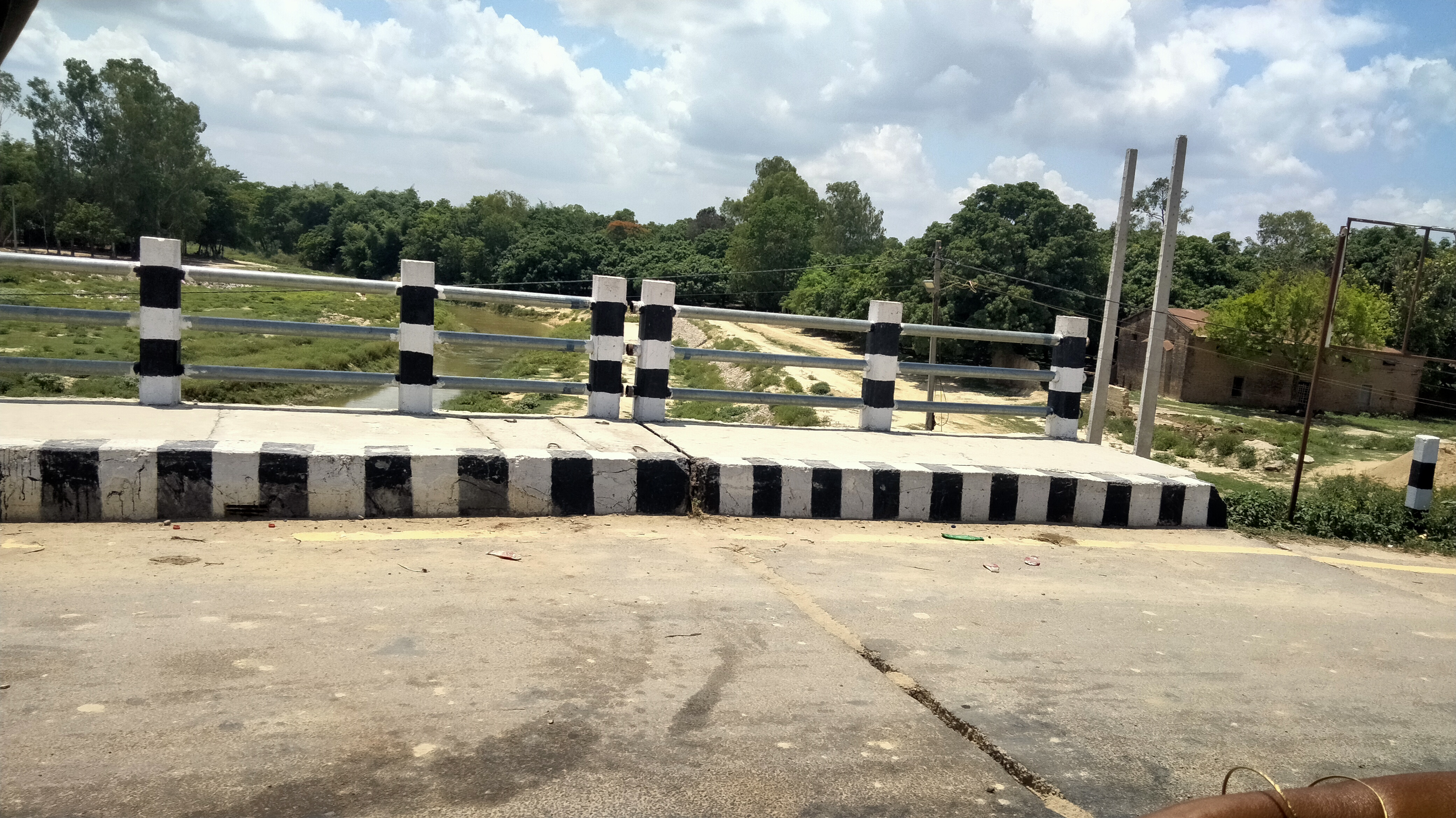
View of Bigghi Khola at Matihani in Nepal

== Religious significance ==
In Hinduism, river has an important place in its cultural activities, religious rituals and sacred bathings. In many occasions people take holy bath at banks of rivers in the Indian Subcontinent. During the Chhath festival, the banks of the Dhouns river is used for the Chhath ghat in the region around the river. A huge number of devotees from both the countries India and Nepal simultaneously offer Arghya of faith during the Chhath festival to the setting and rising sun at the Indo-Nepal Maitri Chhath Ghat near the Madhwapur-Matihani-Rampur boarder, which stretches for about six kms parallel to the holy Dhouns river. The junction of the two streams Bigghi and Jamuni at Akharharghat is a religious place for the local Hindu pilgrimage called as Jamuni Sangam. On the occasion of Kartik Purnima, the adherents take holy bathes at the Jamuni Sangam and do Jalabhisheka on the Shivlinga of the Trilokinath Mahadev Mandir near the sangam at Akharharghat, with the holy water of the Dhouns river.

During the Sawan month in Hinduism, the devotees of Sawan Sombari pilgrimage fill the sacred water from the Uttarvahini Dhouns river at Matihani to do Jalabhisheka on the Shivlingas at Pancheshwar Nath Mahadev Mandir and Narvadeshwar Nath Mahadev Mandir at Madhwapur. Similarly the devotees in the Bisfi Block fill the sacred water of the river at Balha Ghat to do the sacred Jalabhisheka on the Shivalinga of the Ugna Mahadev Mandir at Bhairava Dham in the Bisfi Block.

== Floods ==
The water of river causes some major floods in the areas connecting the river. Every year during the heavy rains, the overflowing water of the Dhouns river causes many casualties and loss of wealth, commodities, animals and agricultural products around its connecting areas. The water level of the river is directly affected by the rains in the Terai region of Nepal.

== Agricultures ==
The water flowing in the Dhouns river is the major source of water for irrigation of agricultural lands by the farmers in the region. Apart from irrigation, the water is also used for bathing and drinking by the cattles of the farmers residing near the river.

== Pollution ==
The linkage of waste chemicals from the factories at Mahendranagar town in Nepal are flowed in the river. These waste chemicals are polluting the water of the river. The water of the river is becoming poisonous and black due to the mixing of the waste chemicals in the river.
