= Indo-Nepal Border Road =

Highway in India parallel to the Indo - Nepal Border lines

- भारत नेपाल सीमा सड़क
- Indo-Nepal Border Highway
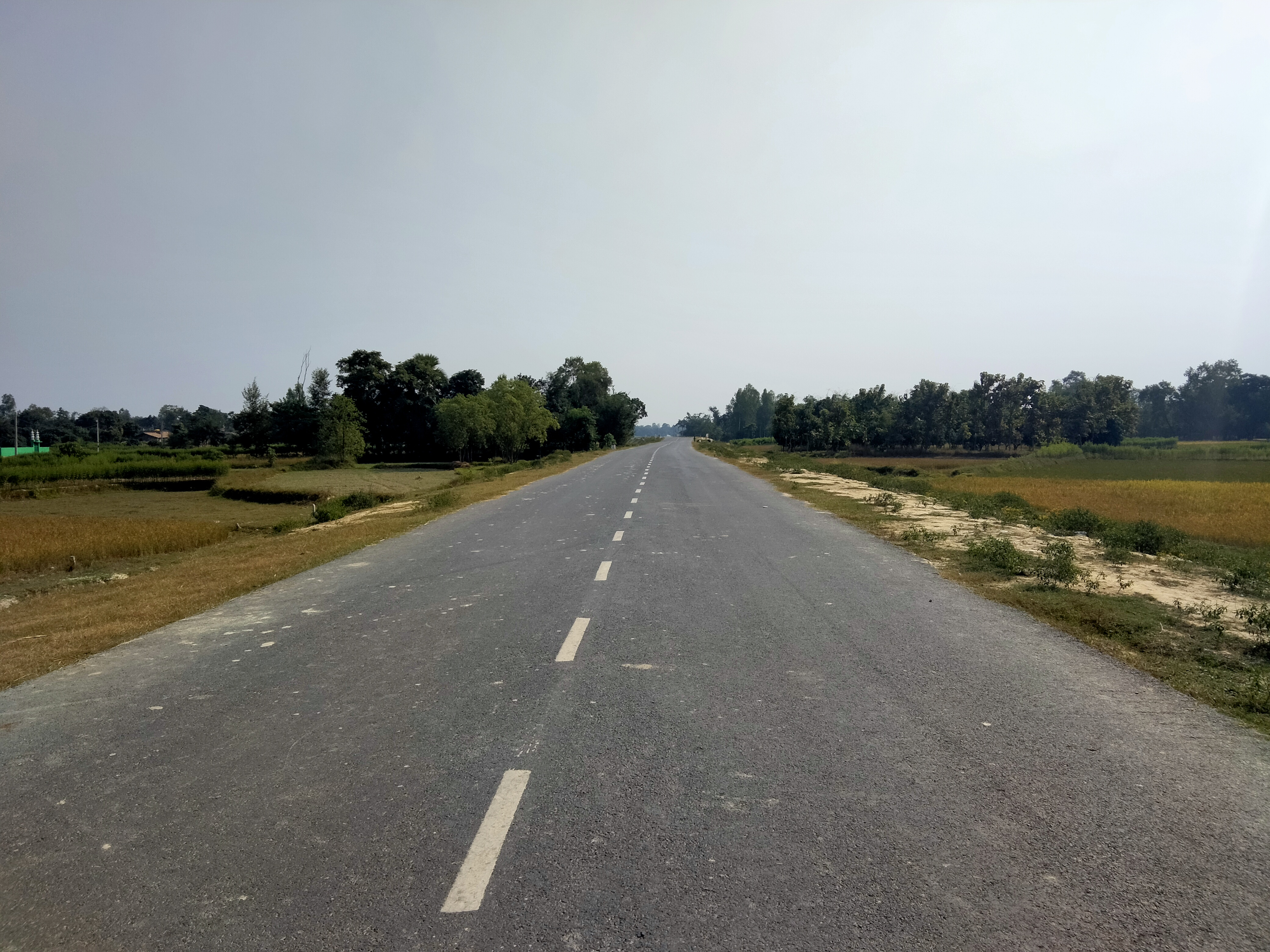
- A section of the Indo–Nepal Border Highway at Basuki Bihari North, Madhubani district, Bihar

Route information
- Length: 1,377 km (856 mi)
- Existed: Indo-Nepal Border Road Project–present

Location
- Country: India
- States: Bihar, Uttar Pradesh and Uttarakhand

Highway system
- Roads in India; Expressways; National; State; Asian

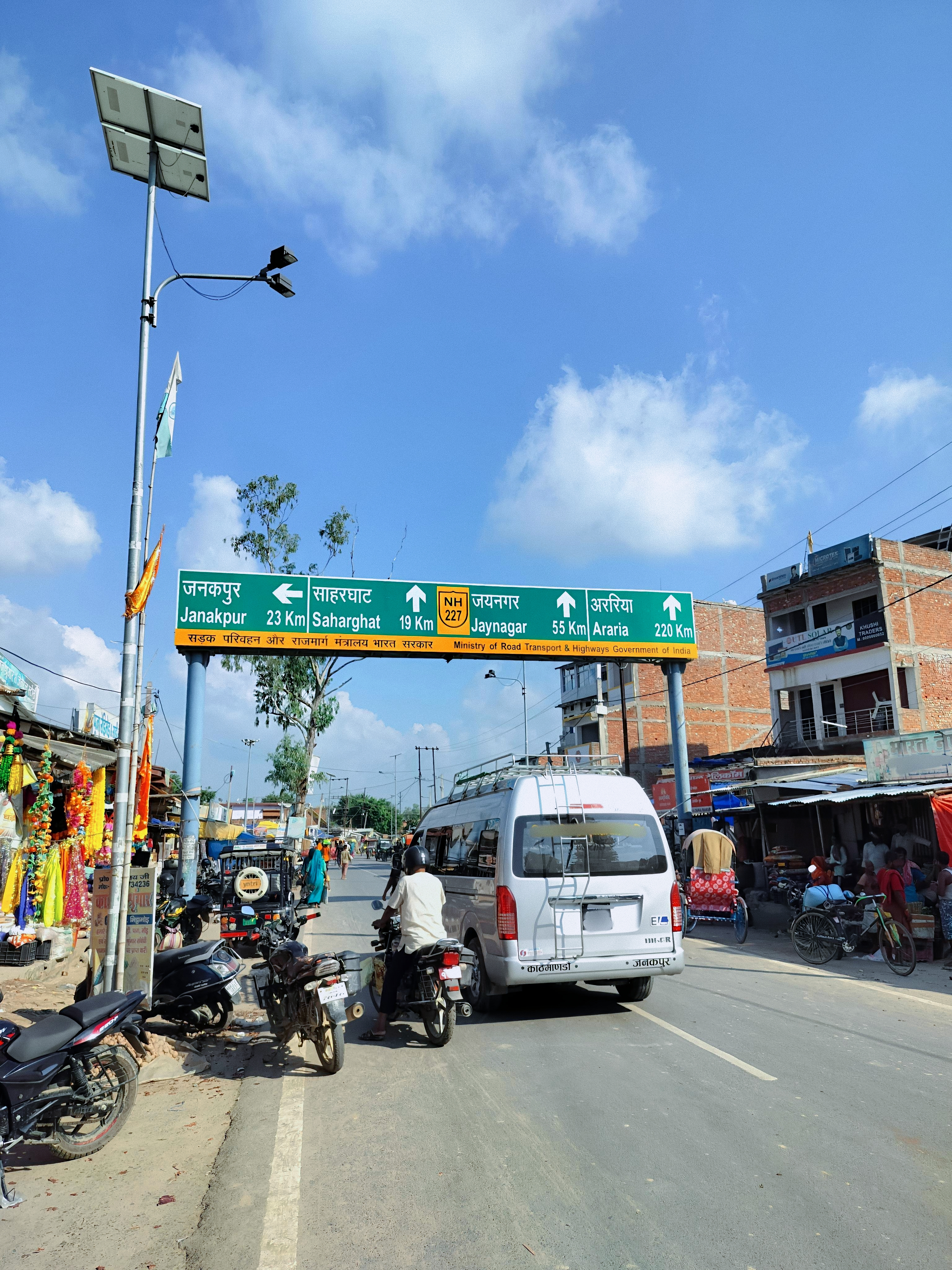
View of NH227 signage board at Bhitthamore, Sitamarhi district near Indo-Nepal border.

Indo-Nepal Border Road (Hindi: भारत नेपाल सीमा सड़क) is a highway approximately parallel to the international borders between India and Nepal which connects the border outposts (BOP) of Sashastra Seema Bal (SSB) in India near the lines of the international border.

== Gallery ==
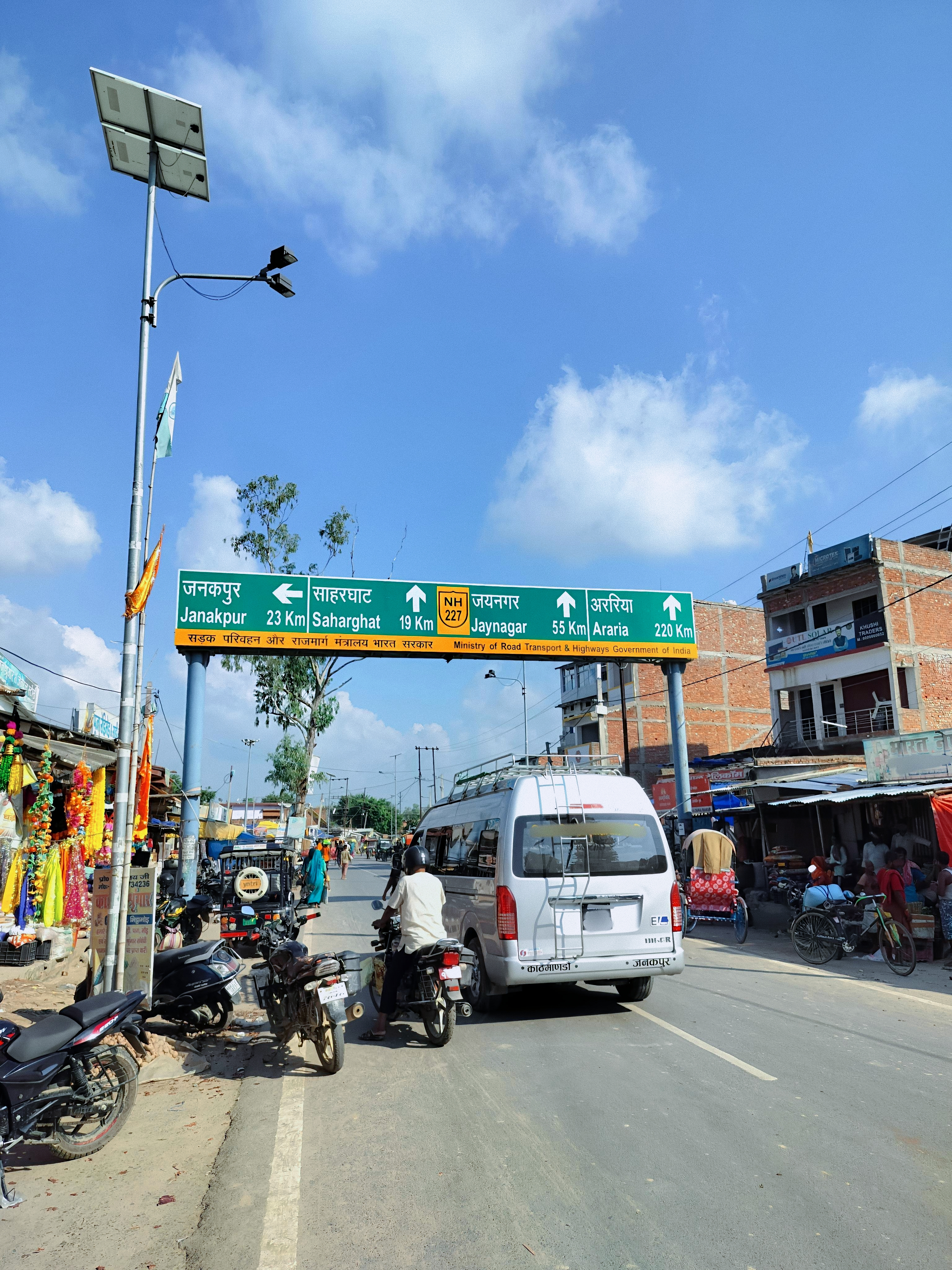
NH-227 signage board at Bhitthamore near the Indo–Nepal border

== Description ==
The project for Indo-Nepal Border Road was conceived by George Fernandes who was the Defence Minister in the Atal Bihari Vajpayee government. This road was initially planned during the Vajpayee Government. After that in November 2010, Central Government of India decided to construct a road parallel to the Indo-Nepal international border from Bihar to Uttarakhand having a length of 1,377 kilometres (856 mi). The project is known as Indo-Nepal Border Road Project. The foundation stone of the project was laid on 25 June 2013 in Supaul district of Bihar by the then Union Home Minister Sushil Kumar Shinde of Manmohan Singh government, in the presence of Chief Minister Nitish Kumar of Bihar Government. It covers the length of 564 kilometres (350 mi) in Bihar, 640 kilometres (400 mi) in Uttar Pradesh and 173 kilometres (107 mi) in Uttarakhand. It is a strategic border road for the easy mobility of SSB troops. The cost of the project was initially estimated to Rs 3,853 crore. But due to the delay in completion of the project, the cost of the project is enhancing with the time. The executive agencies of the project are Public Works Department (PWD) and Road Construction Department (RCD) in Bihar, Uttar Pradesh and Uttarakhand. The cost of the construction of the road is to be paid by the central government and the costs of the acquisition of lands are to be paid by the respective state governments. In Bihar the road starts at Galgalia in Kishanganj district near Bihar–West Bengal border and ends at Madanpur in West Champaran district near the Bihar–UP border. The road passes through seven districts of Bihar. These districts are West Champaran, East Champaran, Sitamarhi, Madhubani, Supaul, Araria and Kishanganj. Similarly in Uttar Pradesh also the road passes through seven districts, they are Pilibhit, Lakhimpur Kheri, Bahraich, Shravasti, Balrampur, Siddharthnagar and Mahrajganj.

== Objective ==
Since Indo-Nepal borders are open and porous in nature, it has become sensitive for anti-national and anti-social activities. The border areas are surrounded by problems including illegal infiltration, drug trafficking, counterfeit currencies, human trafficking and other criminal activities. For the safety of the borders the government of India designated SSB near these borders line. But due to lack of road connectivity in these areas, SSB forces were facing difficulties in the movements of their vehicles and military transportations. Therefore the central government of India initiated the construction of the highway to connect the BOPs of the SSB forces in these areas. Apart from security prospective, the road is also beneficial for economic activities around the areas connected to the highway.
