= Madhwapur =

Coordinates: 26°36′07″N 85°50′54″E

- Village
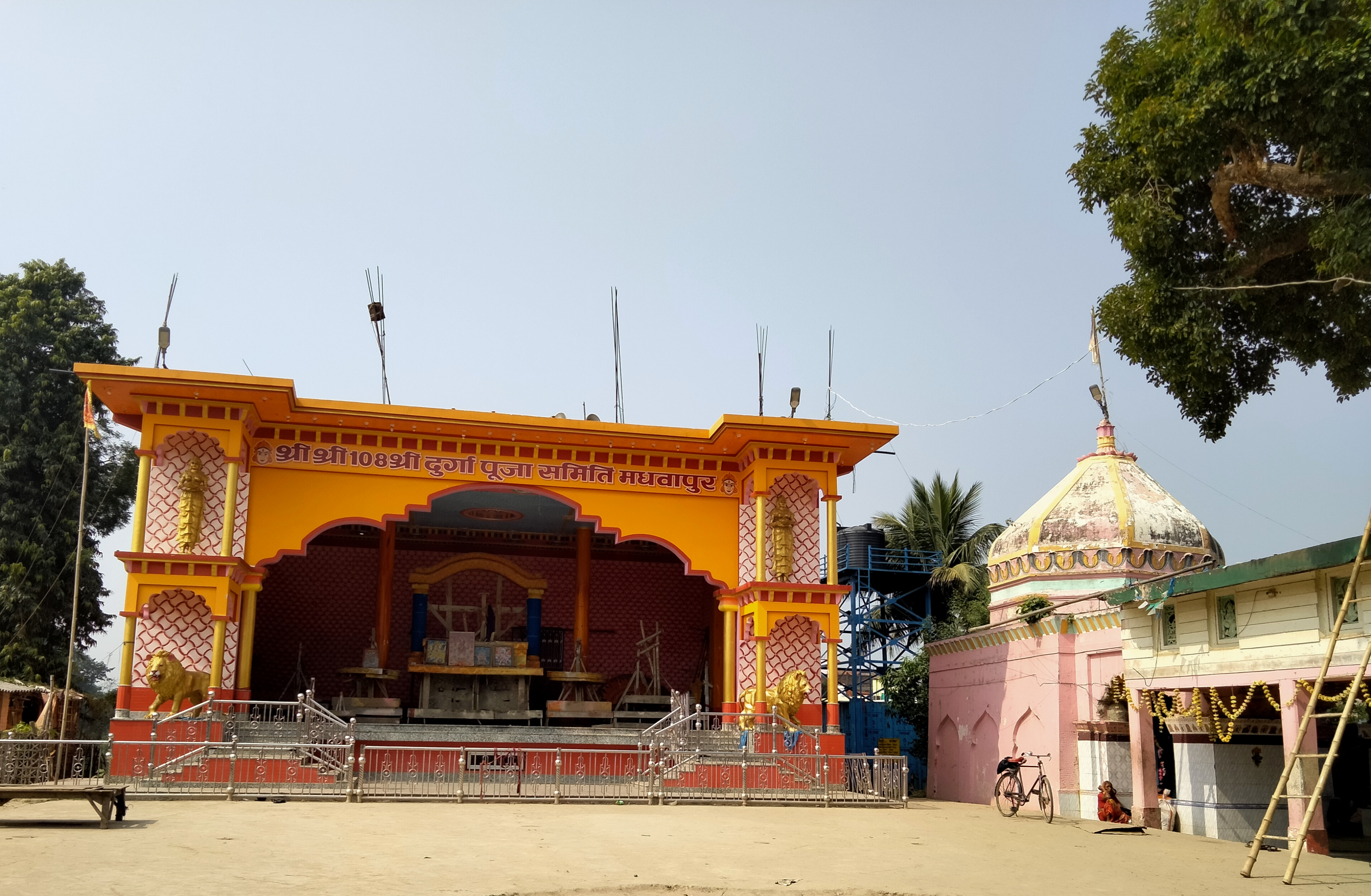
- Durga Puja Mandir, Madhwapur

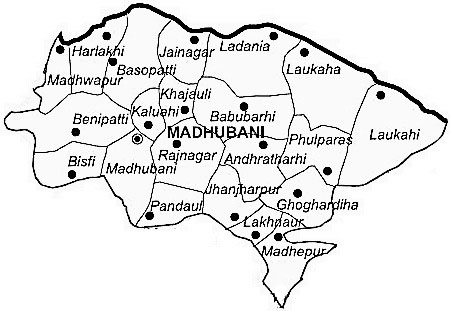
- Country: India
- State: Bihar
- District: Madhubani

Population (2011)Entire Block
  - Total: 134,704
- Demonym: Maithil

Census 2011
  - Population of Village: 6,739
  - Literacy: 66%
  - Sex Ratio: 910

Languages
  - Official: Mother language: Hindi; Maithili
- PIN: 847305
- Lok Sabha constituency: Madhubani
- Vidhan Sabha constituency: Harlakhi
- Website: Madhwapur Portal

Madhwapur is a village cum block in the Madhubani district of the Mithila region in the state of Bihar in India. Madhwapur is a small block with population of 1,34,704 as per population census 2011. It situated on the border of Nepal and India. Business is the main backbone of this village. The native language of the village is Maithili. Apart from the native language some people also speak in the languages of Angika, Hindi and Nepali.

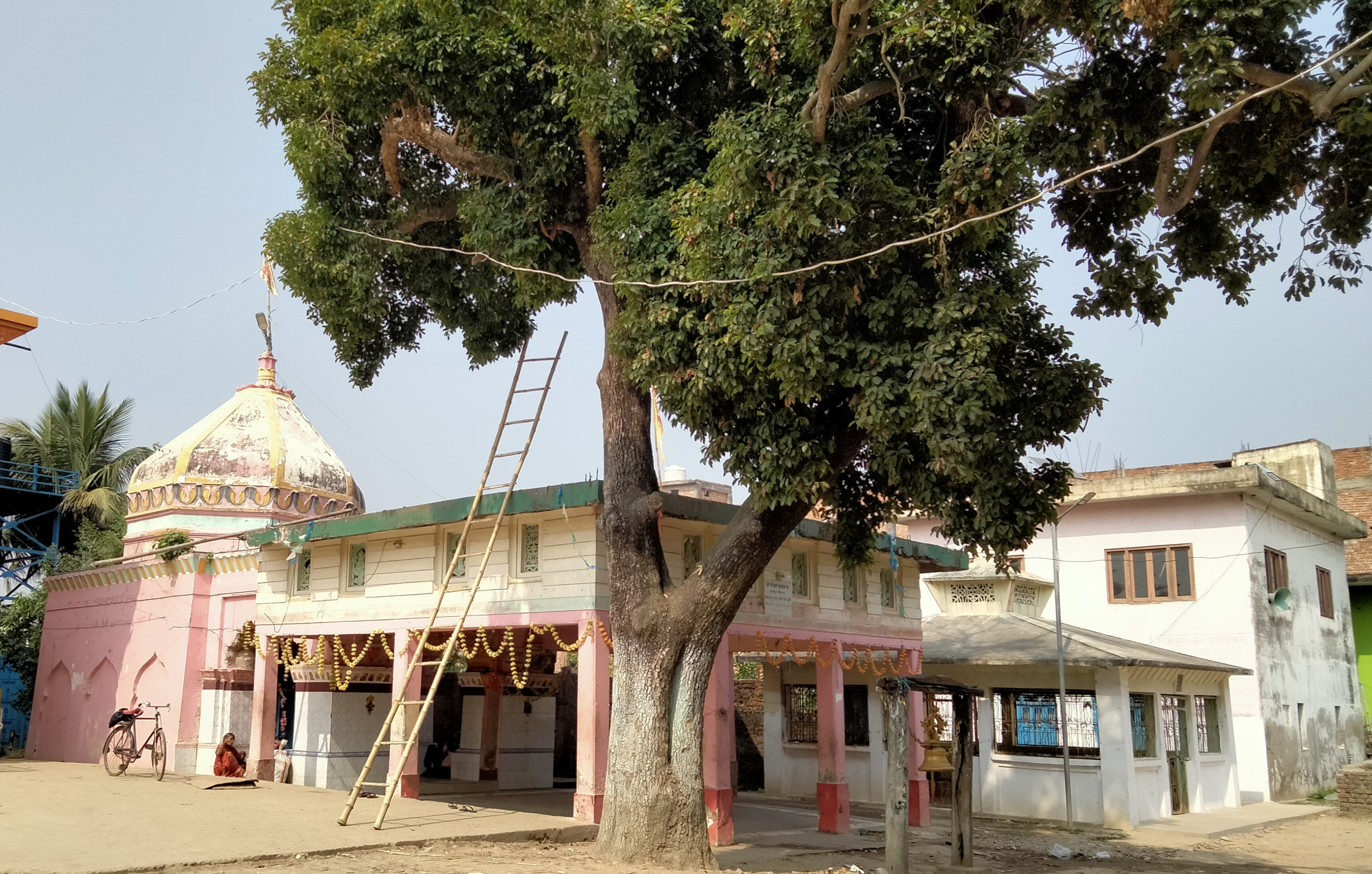
Baba Pancheshwar Nath Mahadev Mandir, Madhwapur

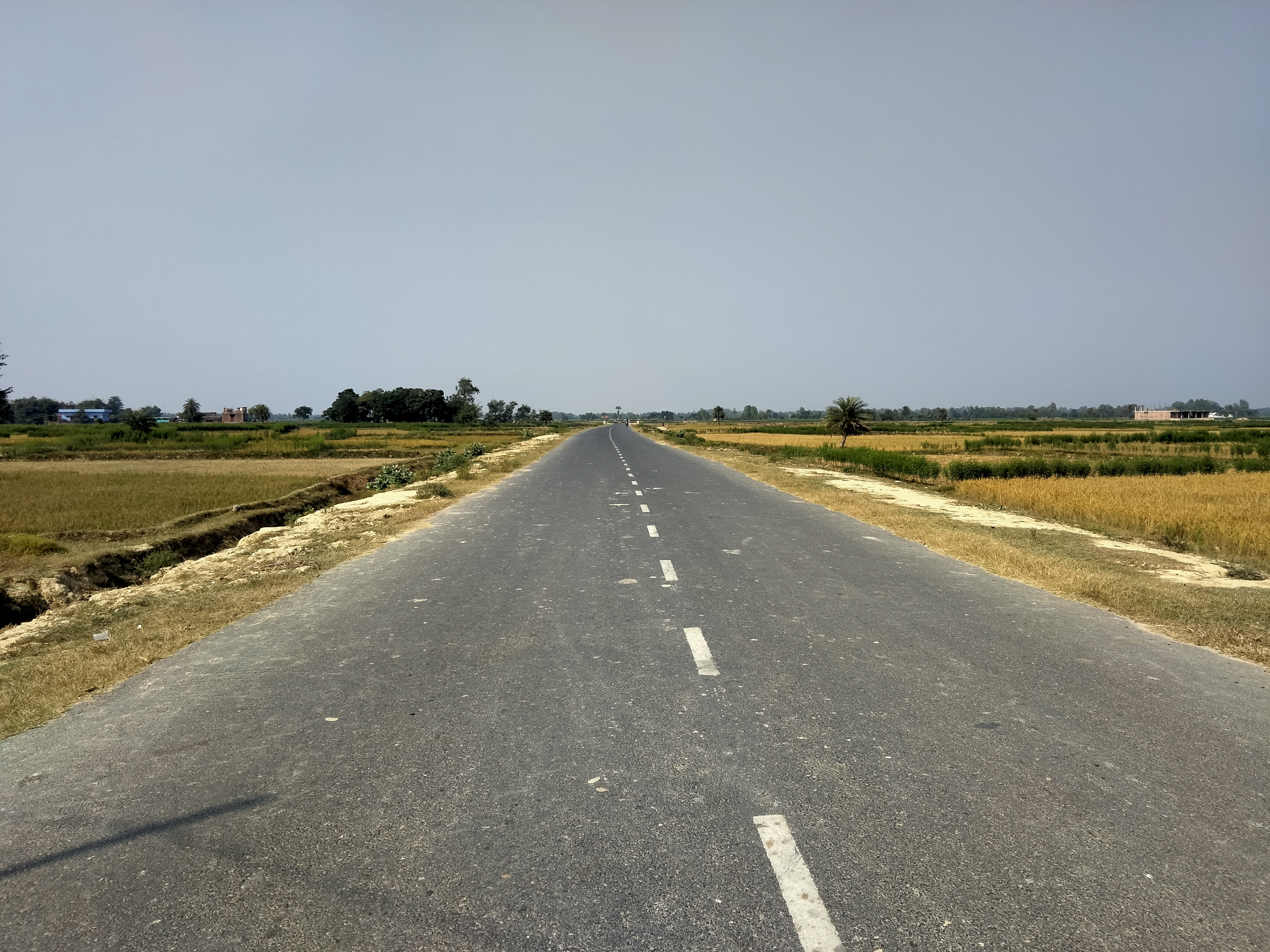
Section of the Indo-Nepal Border Highway at Basuki Bihari North connecting to the Madhwapur block headquarter.

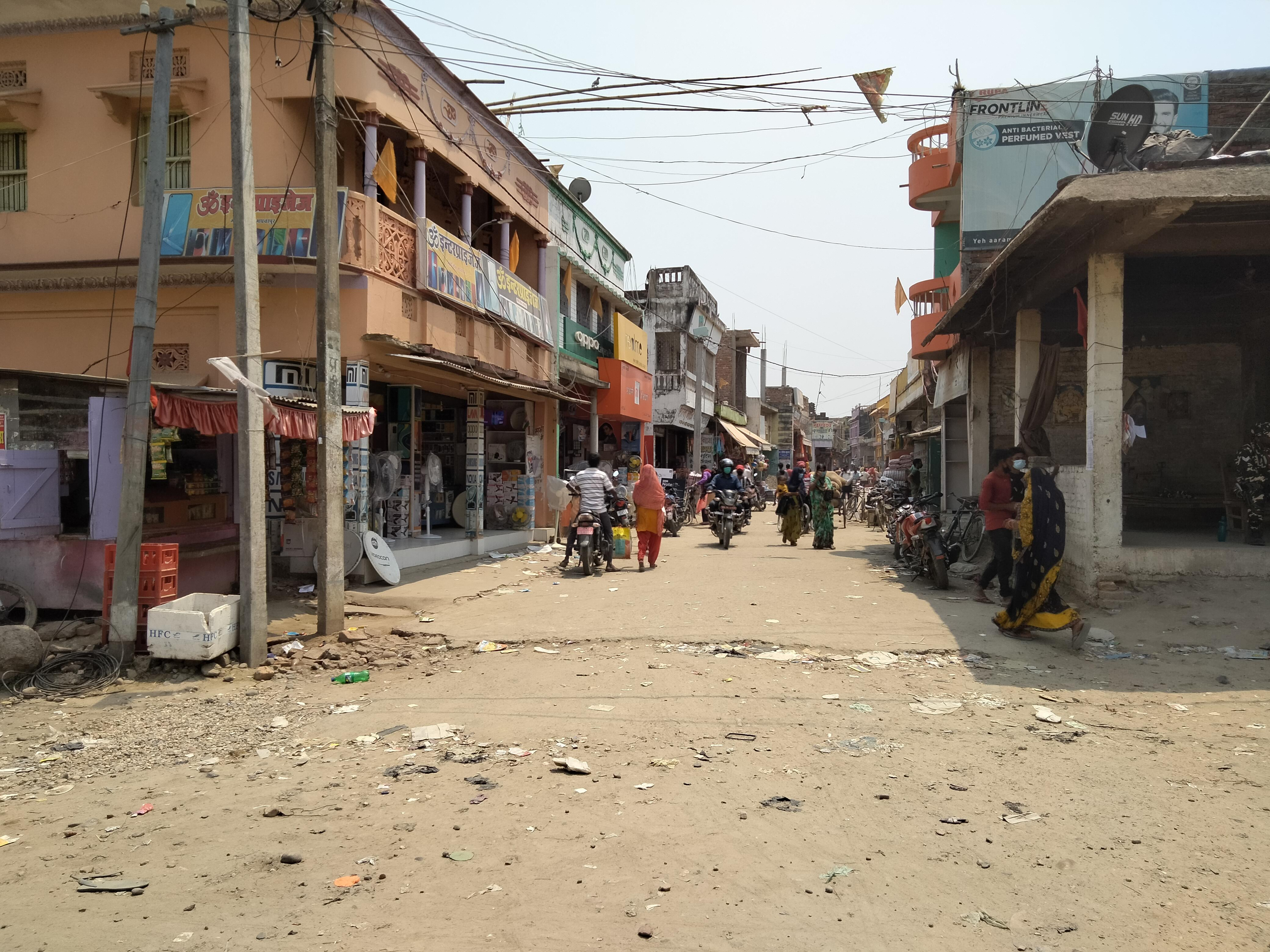
View of India side at Gandhi Chowk in Madhwapur at Indo - Nepal International Border line

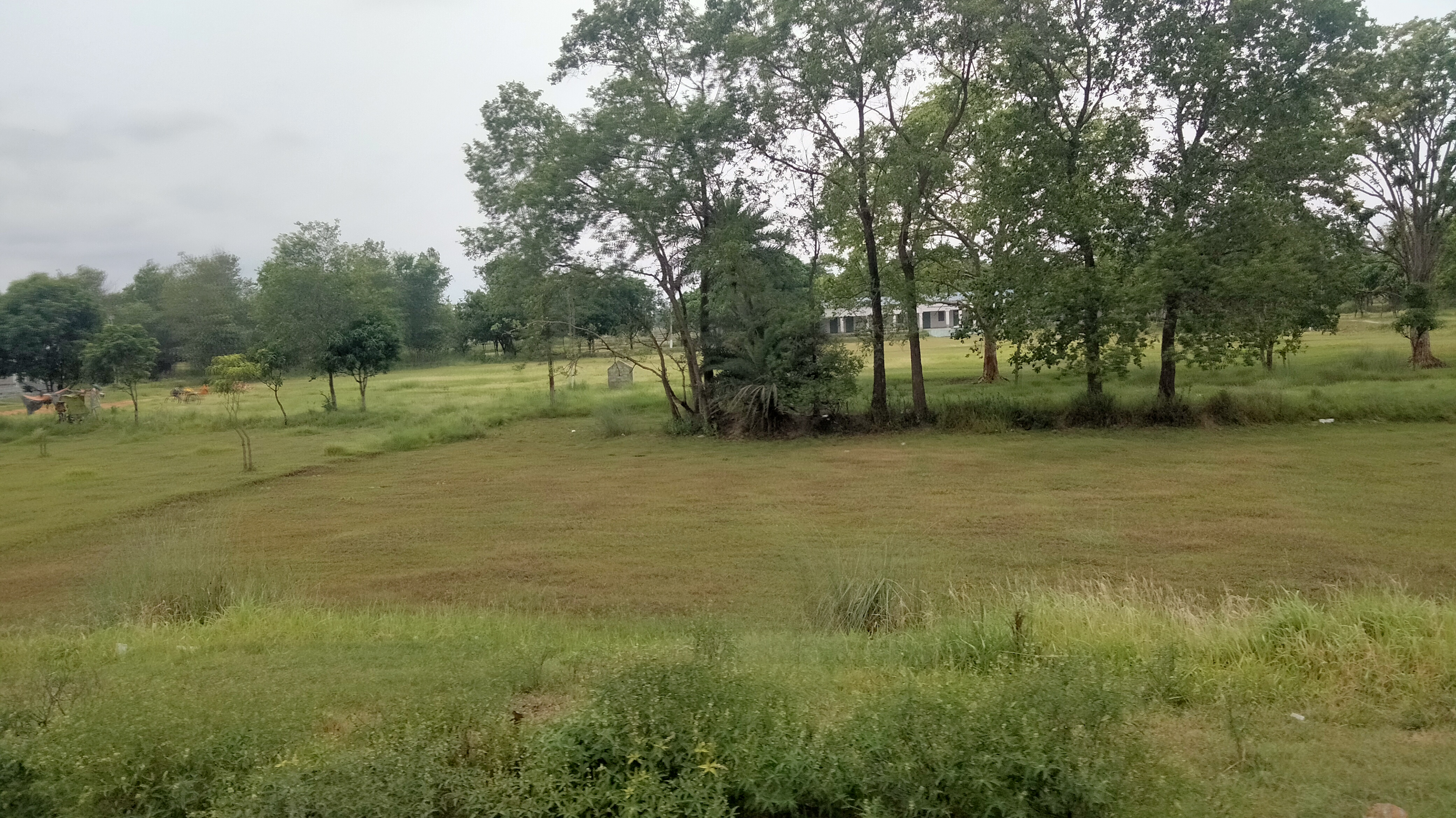
View of the greenary campus at the Ram Niranjan Janata Inter College at the outskirts between the two neighbouring villages of Madhwapur and Basuki Bihari.

== Demographics ==
As of 2011, the village of Madhwapur contains 1362 families and has a total population of 6739, of which 3529 are male while 3210 are female.

The sex ratio of Madhwapur village is 910 females to 1000 males on average. Among children, this ratio is on average 878 females to every 1000 males.

In 2011, the literacy rate of Madhwapur village was 65.54%, with literacy among males at 77.11% and 52.92% among females.

== Administrations ==
The region of the Madhwapur block is administered by the Block Development Officer (BDO). There are 13 Gram Panchyats in the region of the block. The head of the Gram Panchyat is called as Mukhiya which is elected by the adult people of the village. The election for the post of the Mukhiya is conducted by the Bihar State Election Commission.

In the block, there are two seats of people representatives in the Zila Parishad of the Madhubani district.

== Economy ==
View of the Petrol Pump at Southern outskirts of the town.

On 1 March 1904, the Frontier Trade Registration Station of Basuki Behari was shifted to Madhwapur. It was one of the seven frontier trade registration stations in the old Darbhanga district. The Madhwapur town is a commercial hub around the Indo-Nepal border region in the Madhubani district. The economic activities of the block headquarter is regulated and maintained by the local Madhwapur Chamber of Commerce. Pethia Gachhi Bazar is a major market avenue in Madhwapur where Bazaar Samiti has established market complexes. Similarly the vicinity of the Gandhi Chowk is the other major market area in the town. The people of the both nations come here for shopping and marketing.

== List of Gram Panchayats ==
1. Balba
2. Basuki Bihari North
3. Basuki Bihari South
4. Bisapur
5. Madhwapur
6. Mukhiyapatti
7. Pihwara
8. Pirokhar
9. Sahar North
10. Sahar South
11. Salempur
12. Taraia
13. Uttra

== Places of Interest ==
1. Pancheshwar Nath Mahadev Mandir
2. Narmadeshwar Nath Mahadev Mandir
3. Basuki Nath Mahadev Mandir
4. Trilokinath Mahadev Mandir
5. Ancient Vishnu Statue in Bairwa
6. Dakshineswar Nath Mahadev Mandir
7. Basbaria Mahadev Mandir
8. Parikrama Gachhi
9. Gandhi Chowk
10. Bharat-Nepal Maitri Chhath Ghat

== Archaeological sites ==
The Kashi Prasad Jayaswal Research Institute in Patna, has identified and explored four major archeological sites in the region of the Madhwapur block. They are Sunphulwa (Uttra), Dumra, Salempur and Saharghat Garh. The period of the archeological sites Sunphulwa, Salempur and Saharghat Garh is estimated to be the early medieval period and similarly that of Dumra is estimated to be the medieval period.

== Educational institutions ==
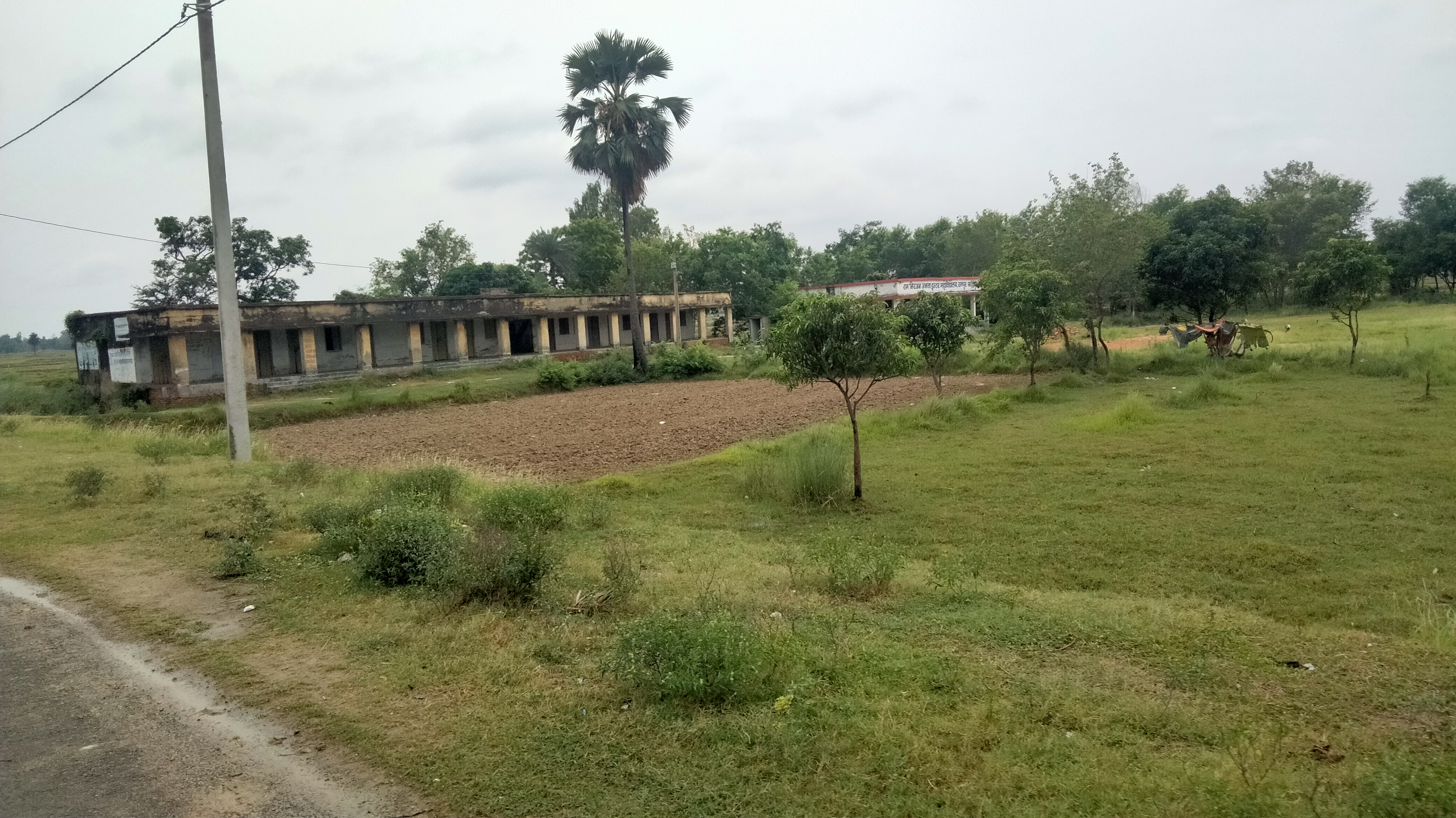
1. Ram Niranjan Janta Inter College at the outskirts of Madhwapur town near Basuki Bihari village
  Ram Niranjan Janta Inter College

== Transportations ==
Roadways are the major means of transportation in the region of the Madhwapur block. The region of the block is connected by three major highways. These three major highways are State Highway 75, National Highway 104 and Indo - Nepal Border Road.

There is a bus terminal known as Madhwapur Bus Stand near the headquarter of the block.

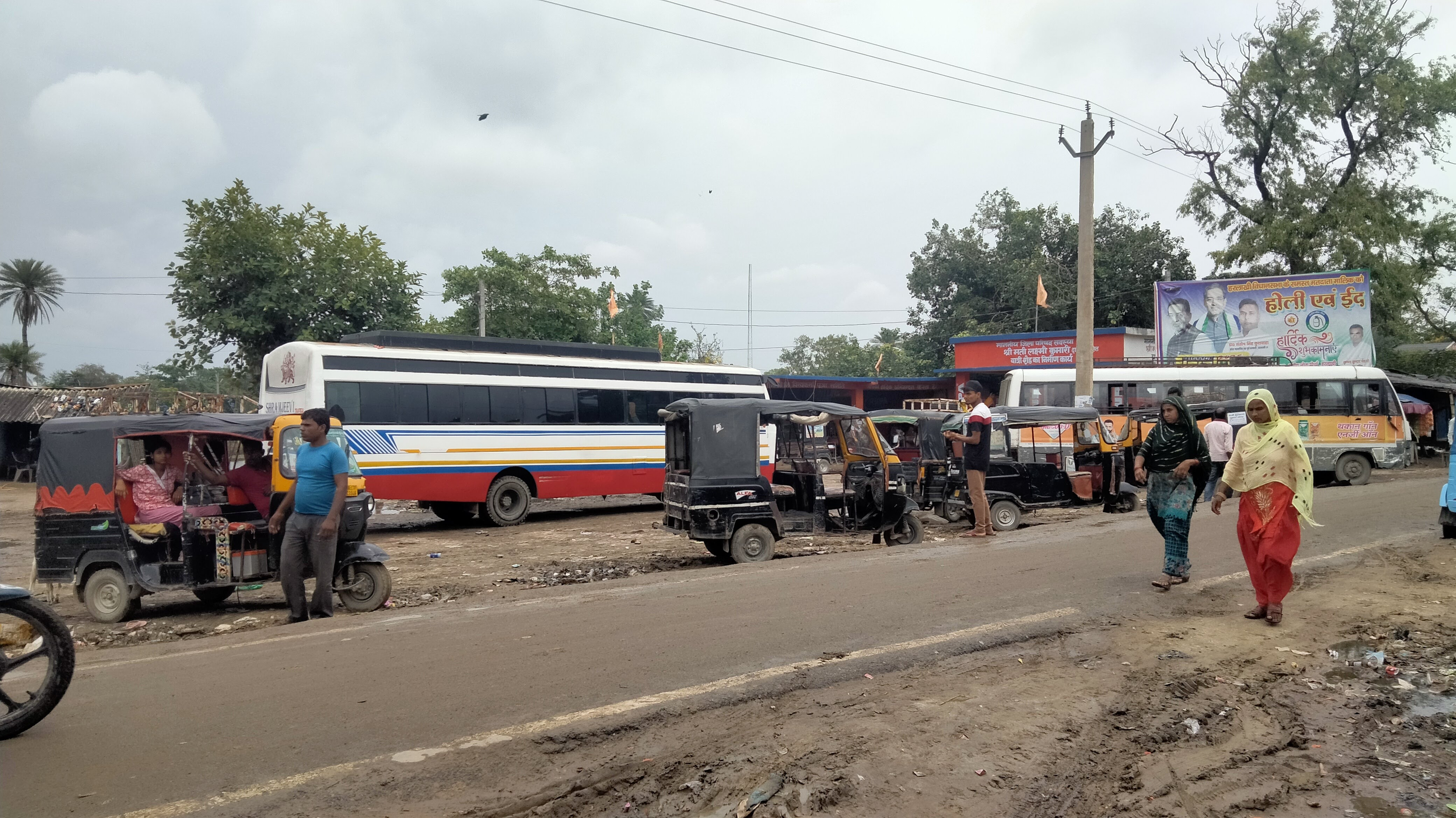
View of the Madhwapur Bus Stand.

== Indo-Nepal Border ==
Madhwapur village is situated at Indo-Nepal Border. On the boundary of the north side of the village, there is trail of the Indo-Nepal International border line. On the north side of the International border line trails, there is Nepalese town Matihani. The distance between the villages of Madhwapur and Matihani is only 20 metres. There is friendly relation between the people of the both border villages. There is neither a language barrier nor a fencing barrier between the villagers of the two countries. The border pillars located in the middle of the Dasgaja road make one realize the borders of the country, but there is no discrimination in the hearts of the people. The mother language of the both villages is same as they were the parts of same Mithila Kingdom in the early period and it is Maithili language.

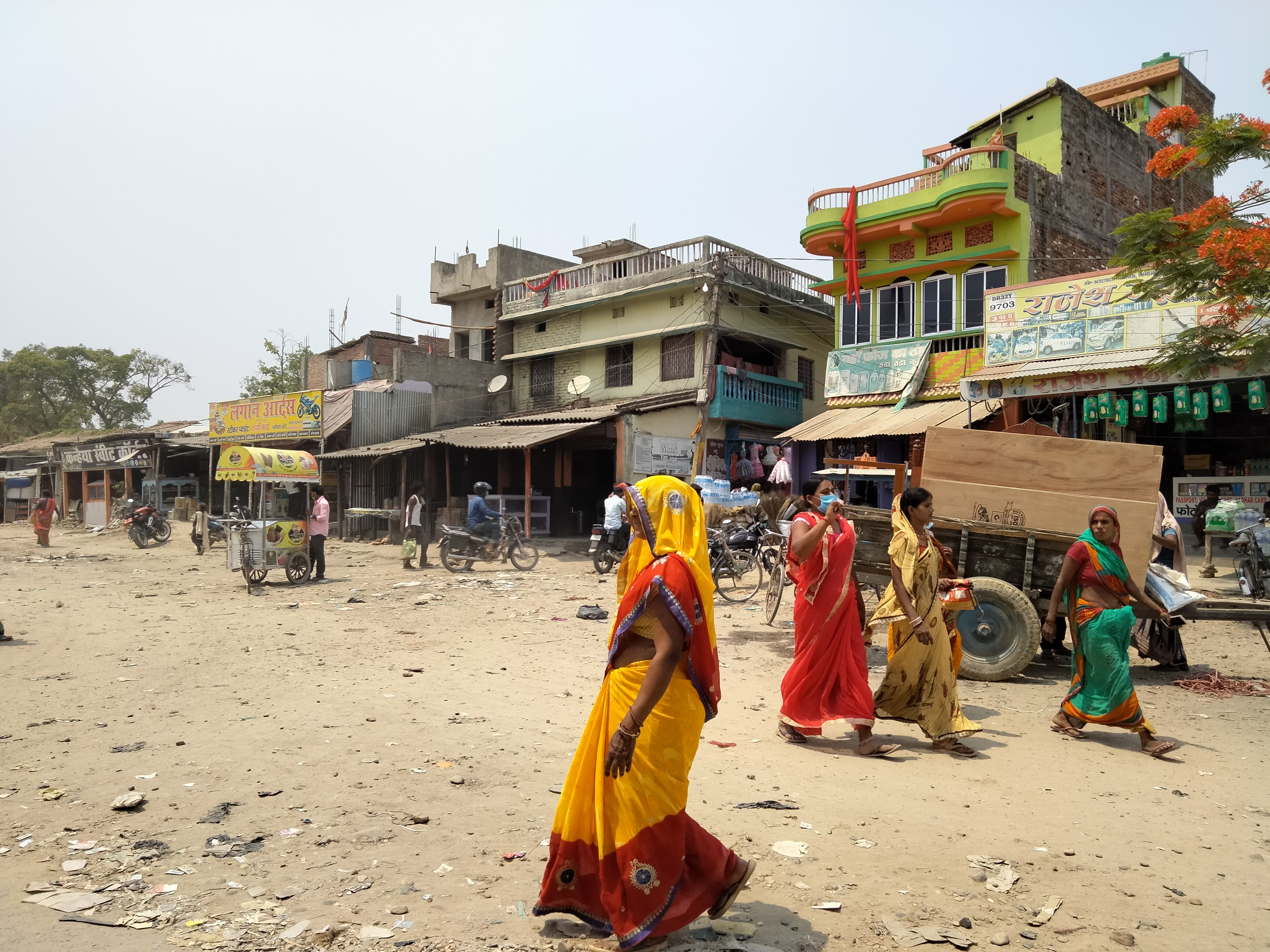
View of Nepal side at Indo - Nepal International Border line at Matihani - Madhwapur border (Gandhi Chowk)

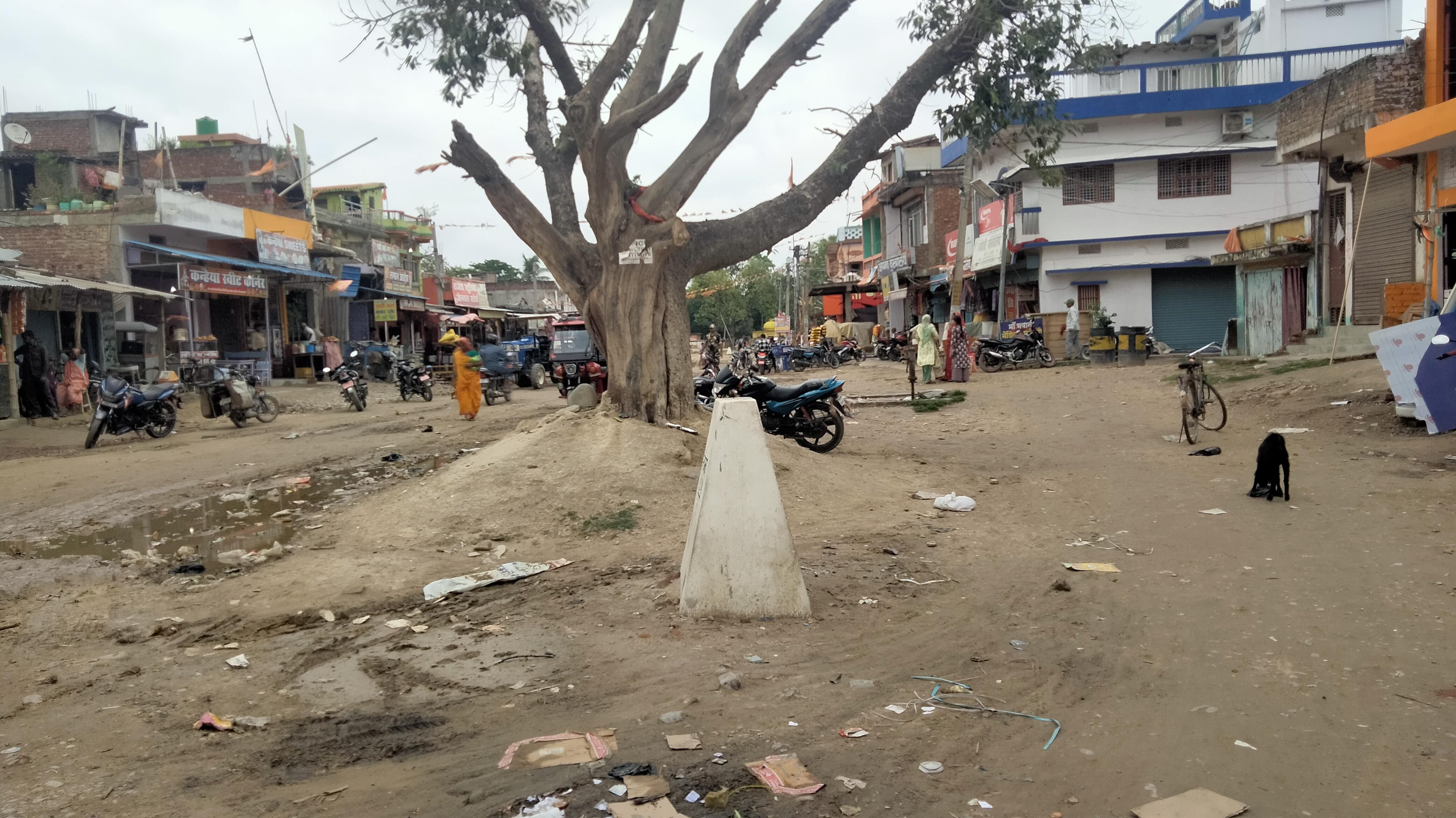
View of border strip known as Dasgaja at Gandhi Chowk in Madhwapur. Right side: Madhwapur (India), Left side: Matihani (Nepal).
