= Dasgaja =

No man's-land border strip between India and Nepal

Dasgaja (Devanagari: दशगजा) or Dashgaja refers to the no man's land strip of the borderland running along the international boundary between the two culturally tied countries of India and Nepal in the Indian subcontinent. It is 10 yard (gaja) wide strip of land along the line of the international border between the two nations. It serves as a border between the two nations. On the strip of the Dasgaja, stone pillars are erected at every quarter mile from the Mechi river in the east to the Mahakali river in the west to mark the border between the two countries. At several locations on the Dasgaja strip, the local people of the border areas from the both sides encroach for making huts and shelters for their cattles, which are from time to time removed and destroyed by the border security forces of the both nations with mutual cooperation between the security forces.

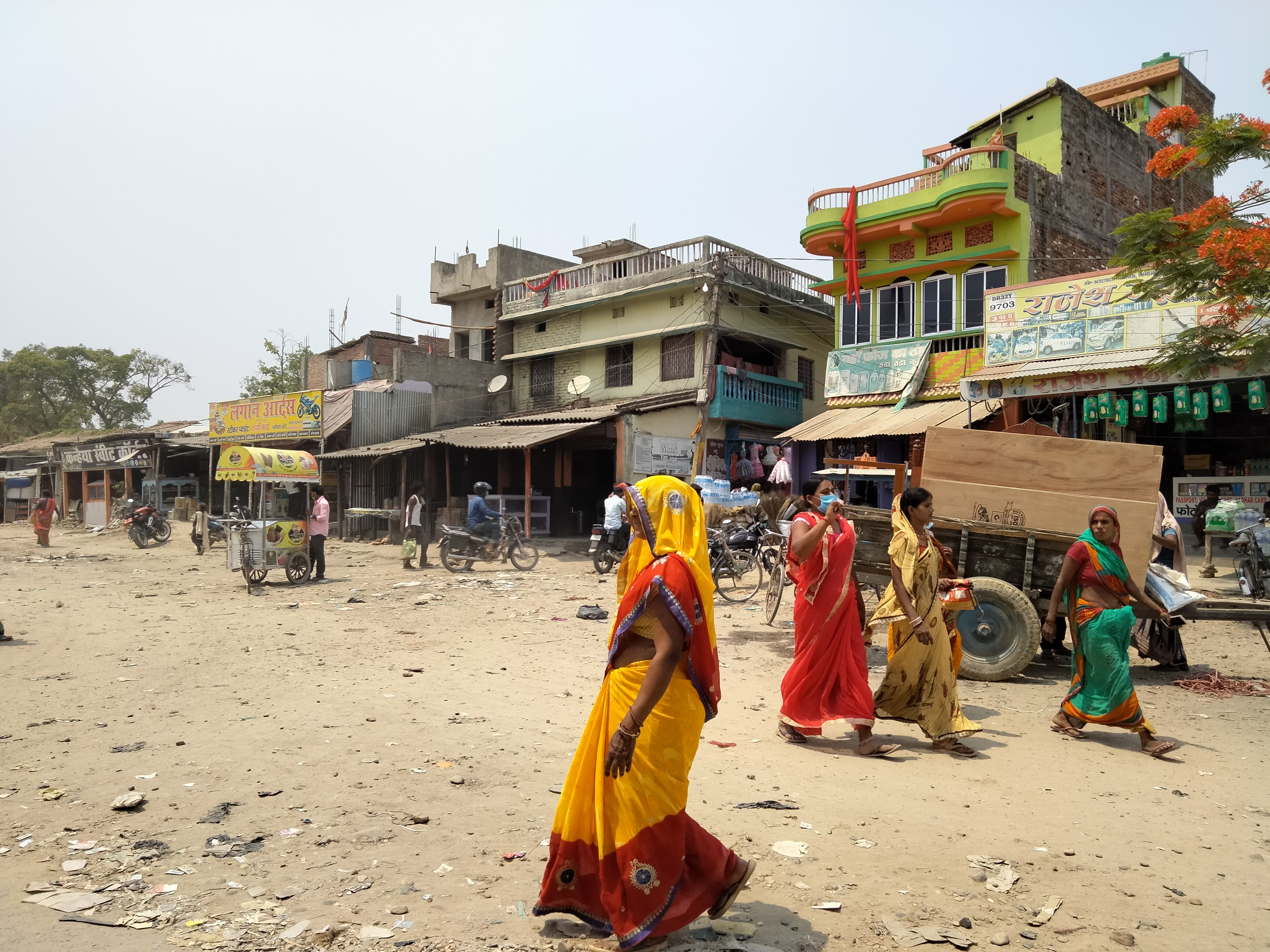
View of the typical Dasgaja strip at the Matihani border (India–Nepal border) near the Gandhi Chowk at Madhwapur.

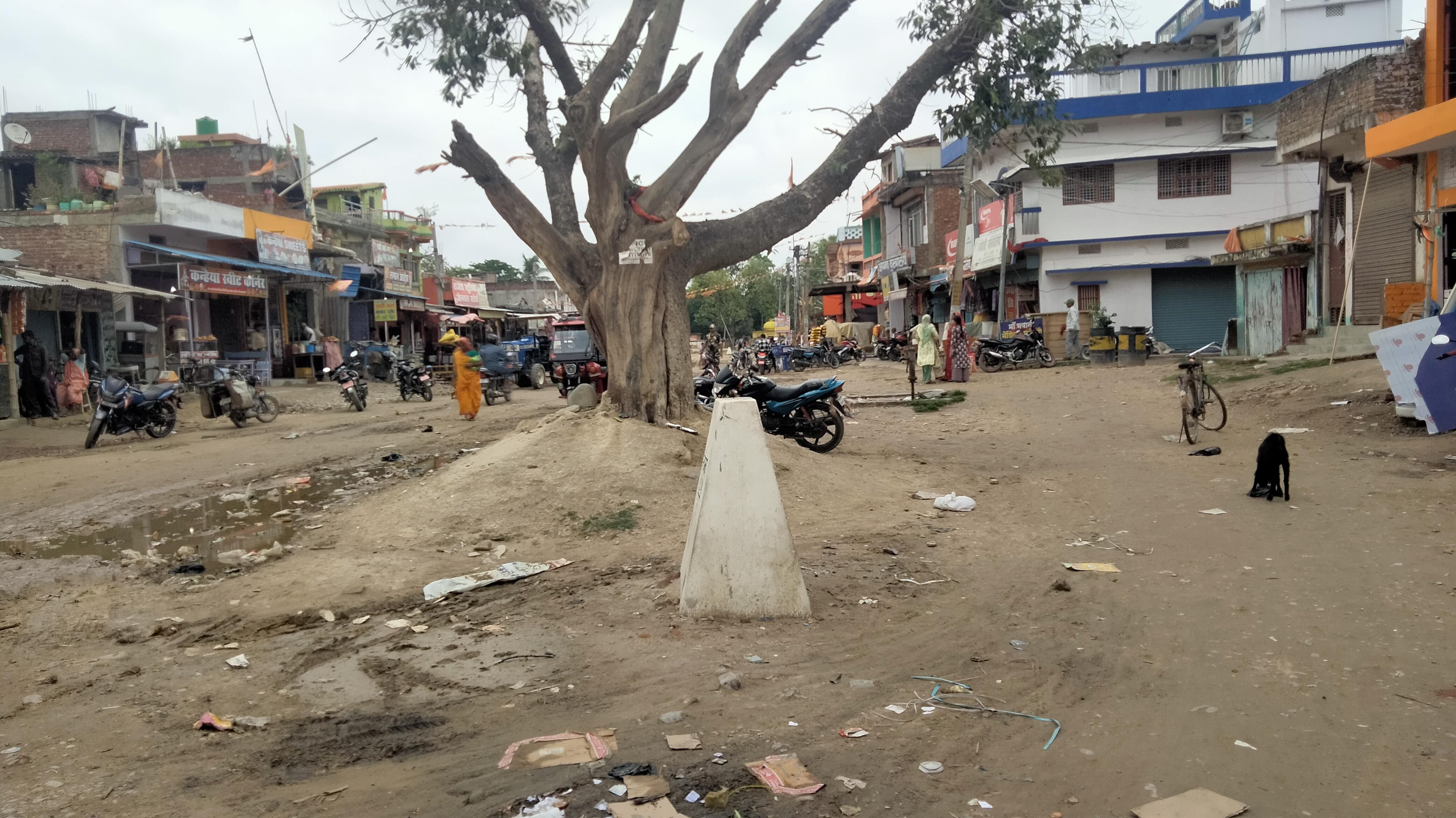
View of a border stone pillar on the Dasgaja strip at Madhwapur

== Etymology ==
The term Dasgaja is a compound word having two Indic terms dash and gaja. The literal meaning of the term dash is ten, and that of gaja is an Indian unit of length equal to a yard. Thus the compound word Dasgaja or Dashgaja translates to "ten gaja wide strip" or "ten yards strip".

== Description ==
The Dasgaja is basically a wide land strip of the India–Nepal border. It is open space used for free movement of the citizens between the two nations. But the foreign citizens from any third country arriving in these both countries are not allowed to cross the strip of the Dasgaja from either sides. According to international law, no one can reside on no man’s land between two countries. Therefore, the Dasgaja lands should always be vacant and no human settlements be established on it.

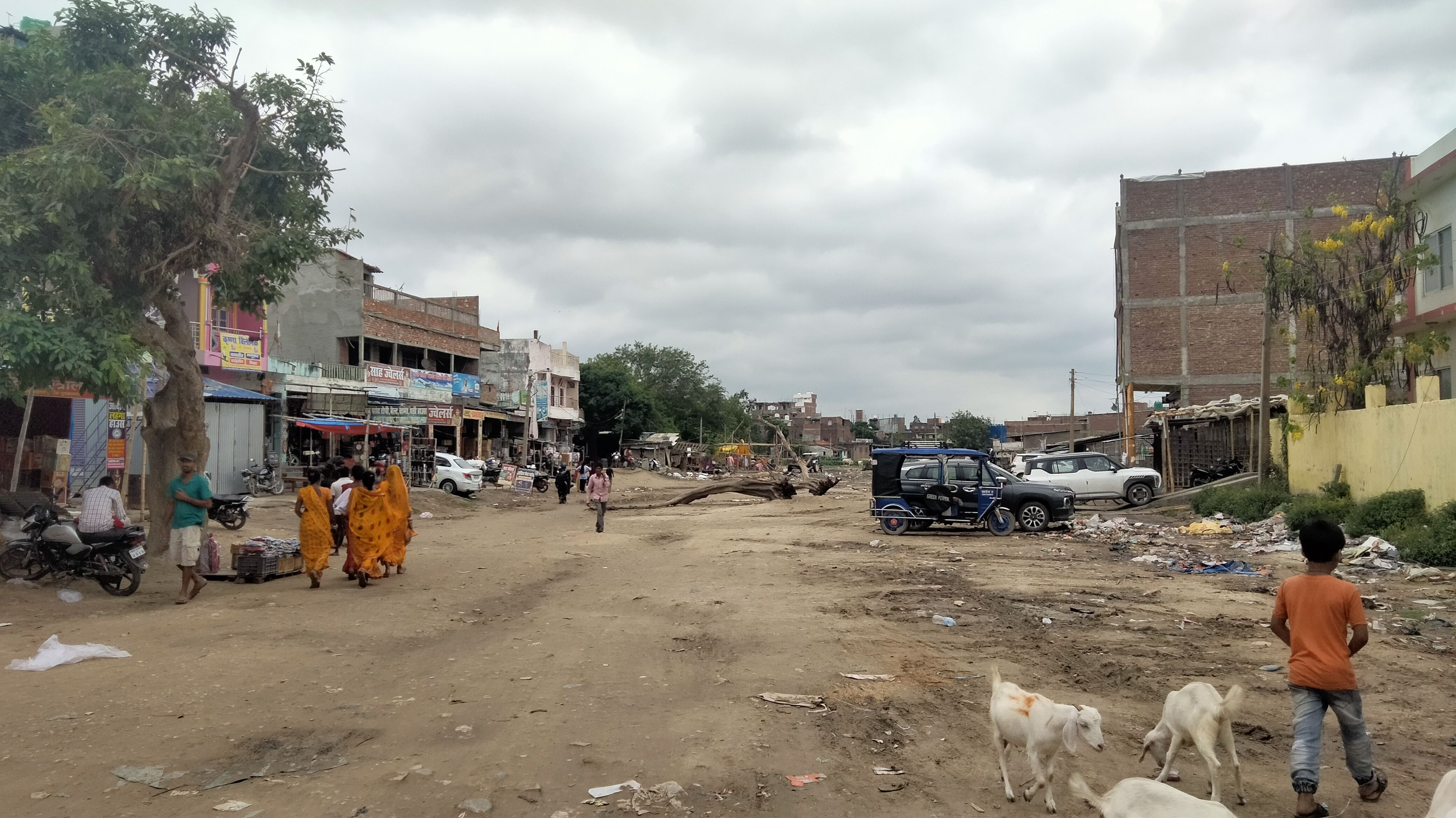
Dasgaja view

The strip of the Dasgaja is regularly petrolled by the joint and mutual cooperation between the security forces of the both nations. If they find any huts or cattle shelters constructed on Dasgaja lands, then these are either removed or destroyed by the security forces.

The maintenance of the border pillars on the middle of the Dasgaja strip are carried out by a joint survey team appointed by the two nations. There are three types of the border pillars on the Dasgaja strip. These three types of border pillars are classified as main, subsidiary and minor.

== Principles ==
=== Fixed Boundary Principle ===
In the river-borders areas, the two nations have adopted the "Fixed Boundary Principle" to maintain the Dasgaja (No man's land) between the two countries India and Nepal. According to this principle, the original strip of the Dasgaja can't be changed, even if the direction of the boundary rivers changed or shifted.

=== International law of Avulsion and Accretion ===
When there is dispute due to change in the direction of a river stream which is accepted as the border boundary between two nations, then it is resolved according to the international law of avulsion and accretion. The fixed boundary principle holds for the shift or change of the stream of the river through avulsion. But if the stream of the river is changed or shifted through the gradual process known as accretion, then the law of accretion holds. According to the law of accretion, the present stream of the river is considered as the boundary of the two nations.

=== Open Border Principle ===
The two nations follow the principle of open border, free and uninterrupted movement for the citizens of the both countries in the lands of the either country. But it is strictly been prohibited for the citizens of any third country to cross the Dasgaja. This principle helps the both nations to strengthen and maintain the relation of the Roti-Beti ka Rishta between the two nations forever.

== History ==
According to local residents of some locations near the Dasgaja strip, before the demarcation of the border between India and Nepal, there were some complete villages on the present Dasgaja at these locations. The Dasgaja came into existence, when India gifted the lands of Naya Muluk (new nation) to Nepal post the Treaty of Sugauli through the border re-adjusting Treaty of 1860. This treaty provides the actual maps and geography of Nepal. The Government of India considers the actual map of Nepal as confirmed by the border re-adjusting Treaty of 1860. The first formal recognition of the sovereignty and independence of Nepal was established through the Treaty of Friendship 1923 between Nepal and Britain. After that the land at the Dasgaja was divided into the two nations India and Nepal. Later, the security forces of the both nations gradually vacated the human settlements from these areas of the Dasgaja to identify the border points on it.

Even though the people of these villages are divided into two nations, they help each other in emergency situations like fire, flood and other incidents. They also continued their mutual relations and strengthened the Roti-Beti ka Rishta between the two nations.

== Cross-border occupation ==
The cross-border occupation refers to the use or possession of land across the border. According to the Ministry of External Affairs in Nepal, at some locations near the Dasgaja strip, citizens of one country cultivate or reside on land that falls within the territory of the other country. The technical team of the country in its studies have found that, the present lands being used and occupied by Nepal at some places near the border, may actually fall in the territory of India. These types of land occupation of the other country across the border is called cross-border occupation.
