= Rampur Village =

Village in Mithila

Rampur Rampur Virit
- Village
- Rampur
- Interactive map of Rampur
- Coordinates: 26.6004359°N 85.8488846°E
- Country: India
- State: Bihar
- Region: Mithila region
- District: Madhubani district
- Block: Madhwapur
- Named for: Lord Rama
- Demonym: Maithil

Language
  - Official: Hindi

Additional language
  - Mother language: Maithili

Rampur is a village in the Madhubani district of the Mithila region in the state of Bihar in India. It is located in the Madhwapur block. It is situated on the western bank of the Dhouns River near the Indo-Nepal International border.

The village of Rampur is the part of Madhwapur Gram Panchyat. It lies in the north side of the Basuki Bihari village.
