= List of Shiva temples in Mithila =

Lord Shiva temples in Mithila

In the Mithila region of the Indian subcontinent there are many temples dedicated to Shiva. Shiva is one of the most commonly followed deities in this region. The land of the region is praised as the land of Shivalya. A temple of Shiva is locally known as Shivalya.

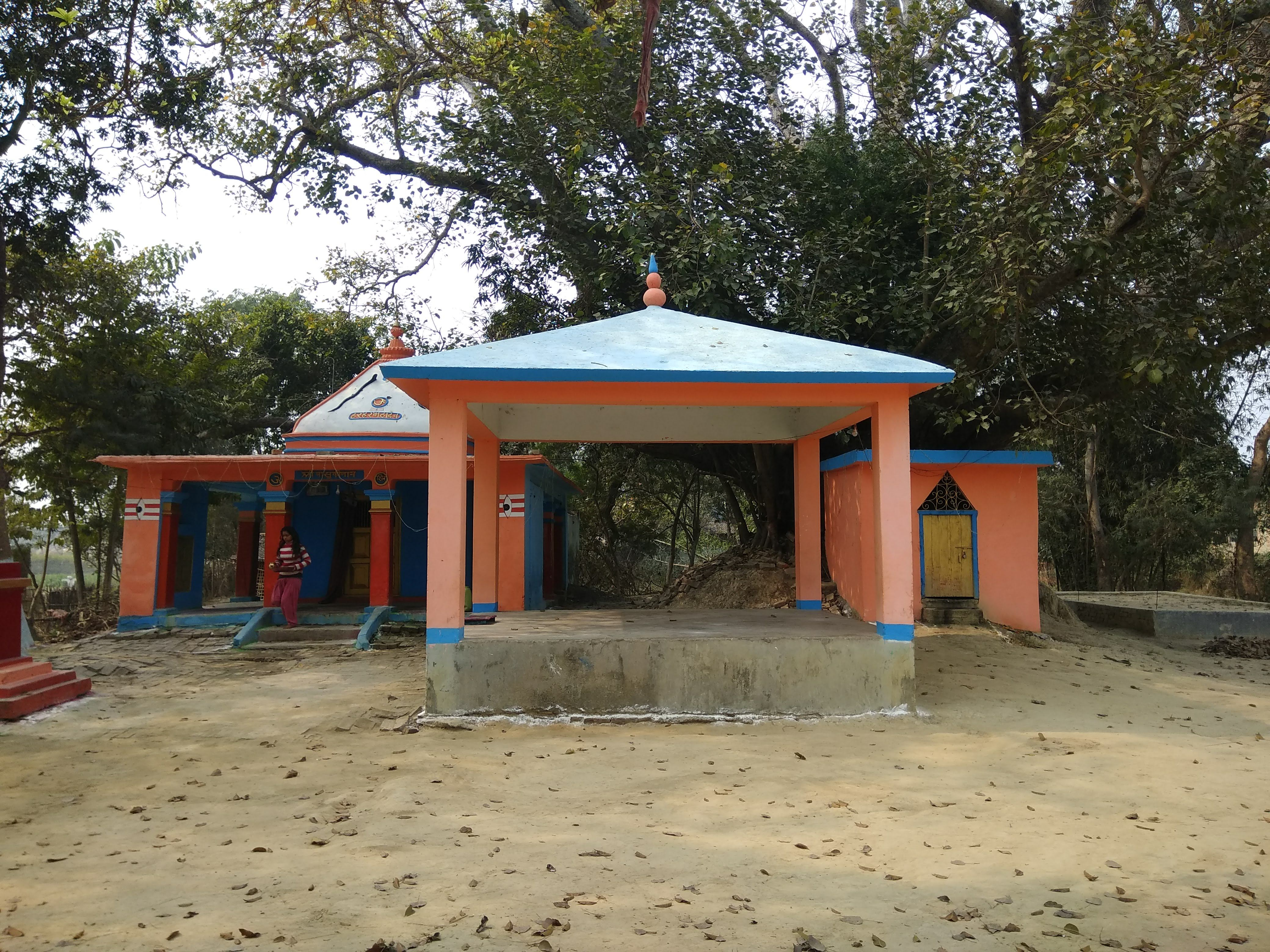
View of a Shivalaya of Basuki Nath Mahadev Mandir at Basuki Bihari village in the Madhubani district of the region.

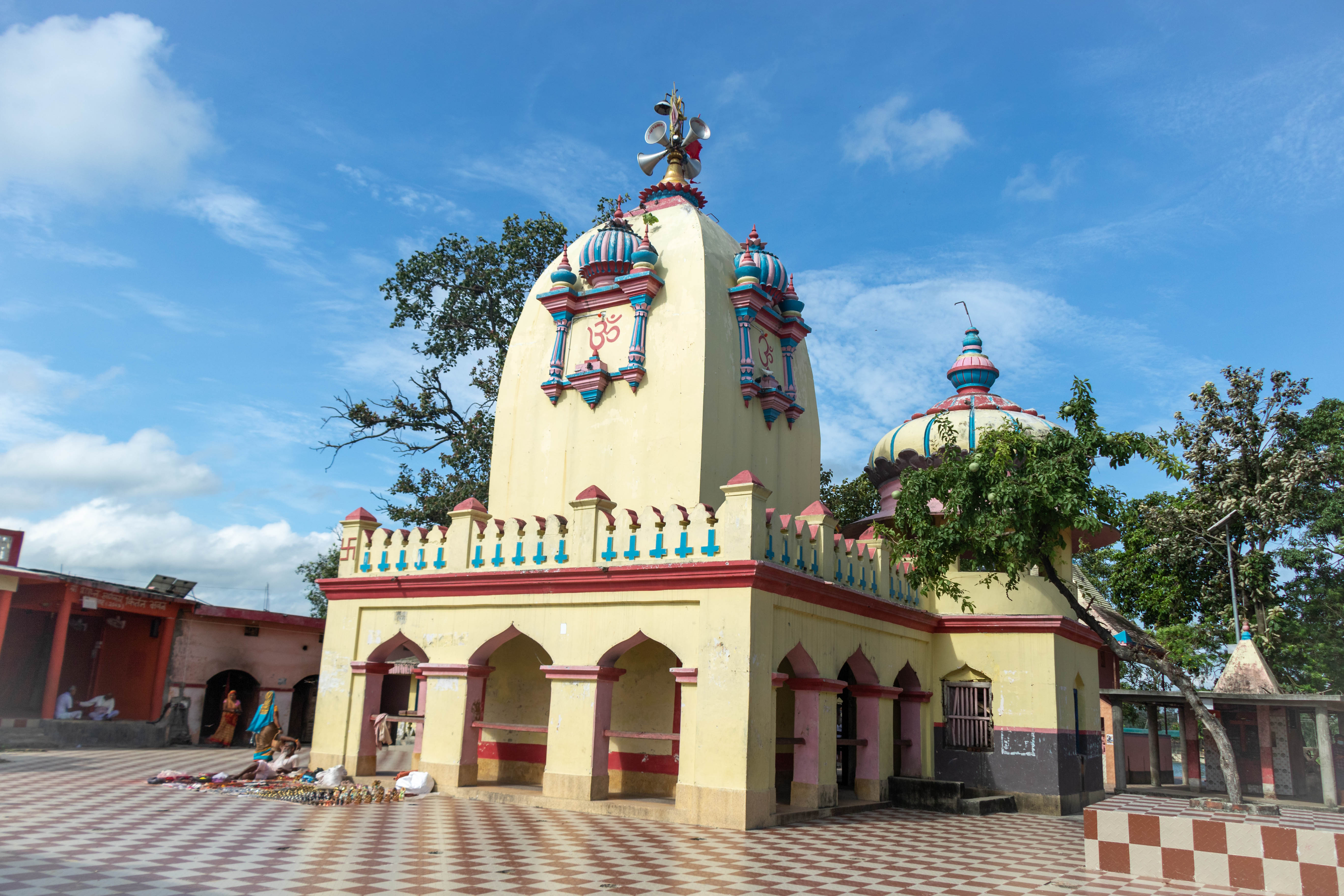
View of Jaleshwar Mahadev Mandir at Jaleswar town in the Mithila region of Nepal.

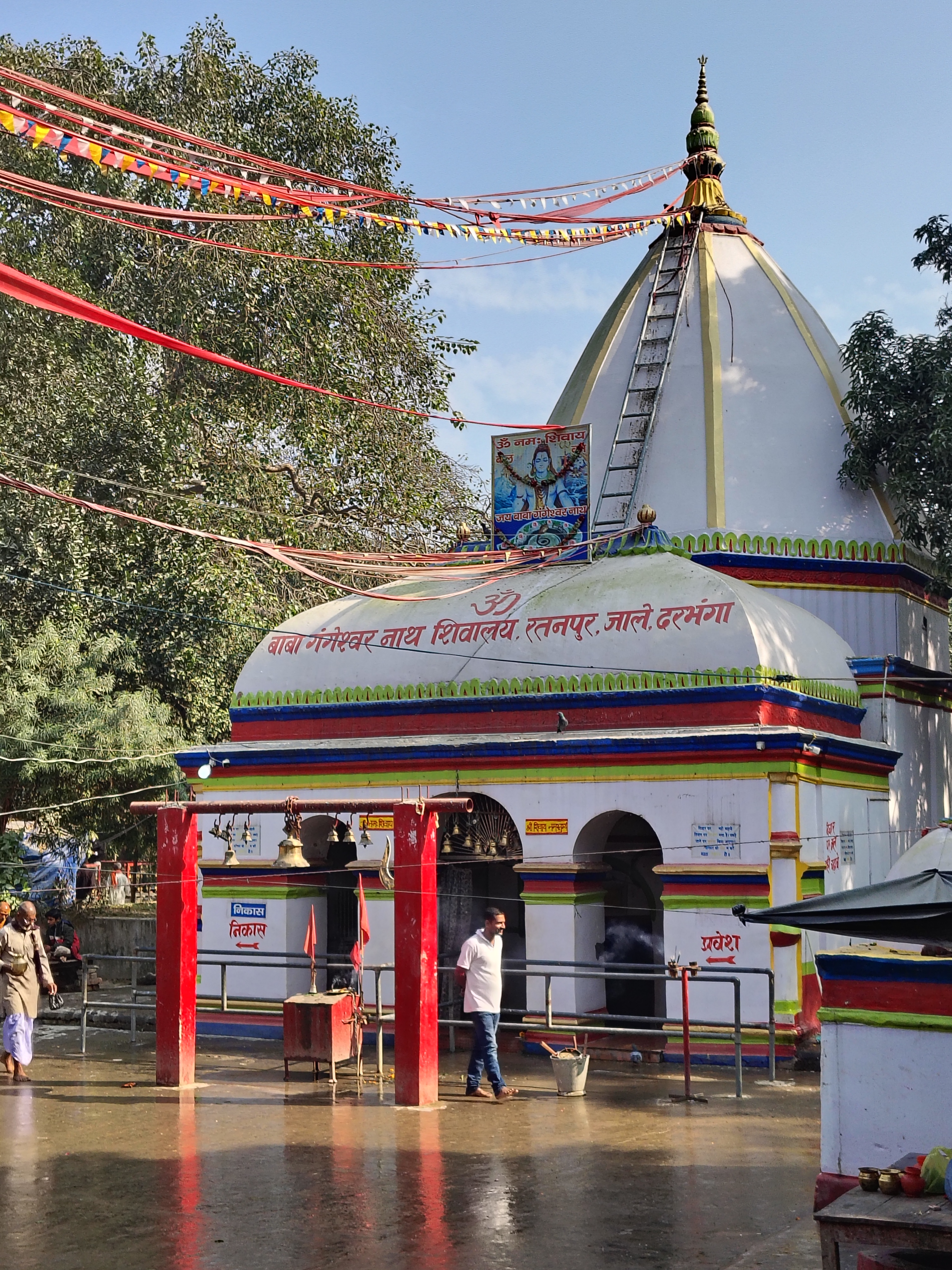
Baba Gangeshwarnath Mahadev Mandir at Ratanpur Abhiman village in the Darbhanga district.

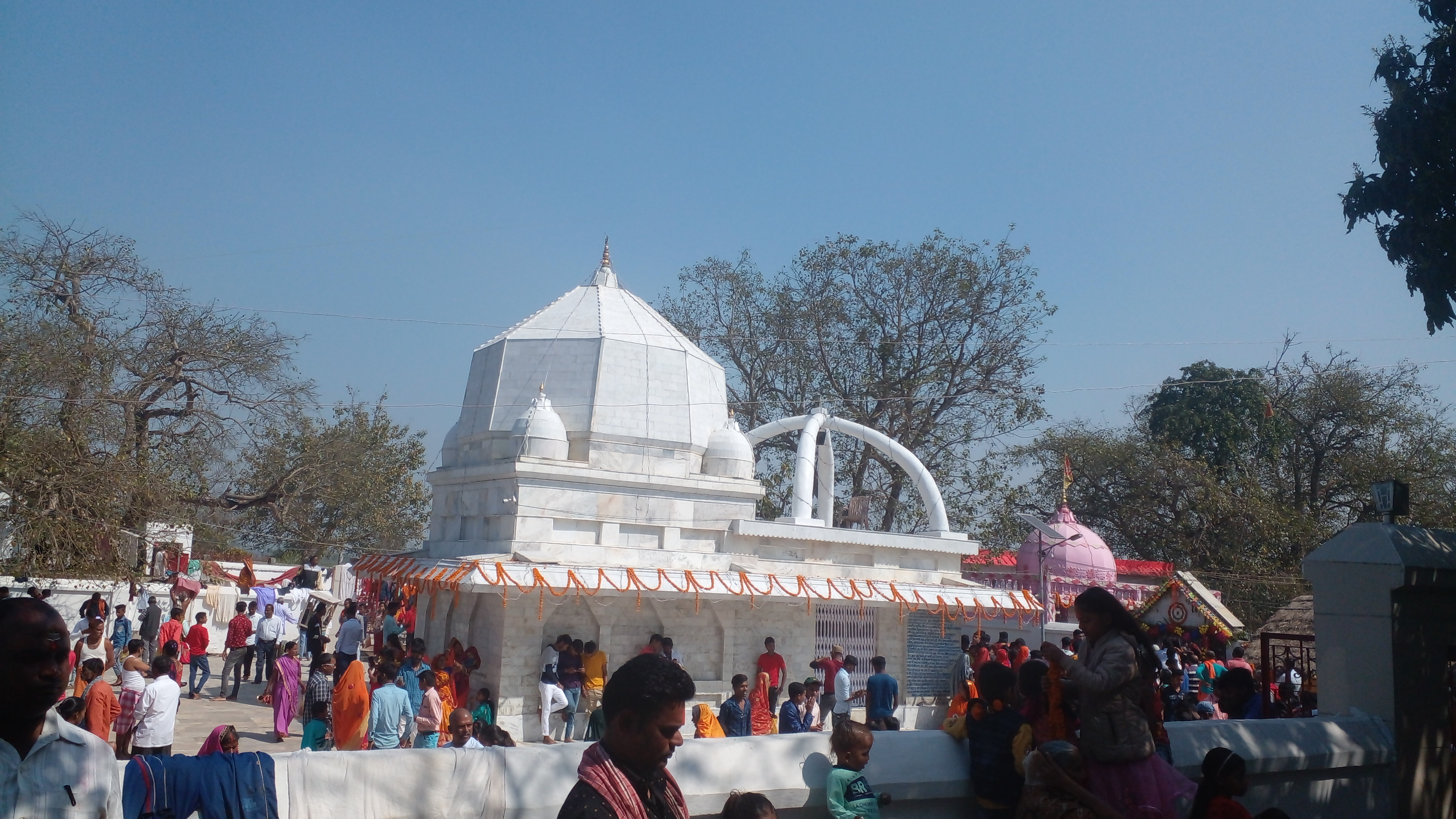
The legendary Kalyaneshwar Mahadev Mandir founded by the King Janaka of Mithila.

== List of Shiva temples in Mithila ==
=== A ===
1. Adbhutanath Mahadev Mandir
2. Amneswarnath Mahadev Mandir

=== B ===
1. Baba Dhaneshwar Nath Mahadev Mandir, Bagahi Dham
2. Baba Garib Sthan Mandir
3. Baba Maneshwarnath Mahadev Mandir
4. Baneshwar Nath Mahadev Mandir
5. Basbaria Mahadev Mandir
6. Basuki Nath Mahadev Mandir
7. Bhairava Ugna Mahadev Mandir
8. Bhimshankar Temple
9. Bhola Baba Pahadi Mandir
10. Bhuvaneshwar Nath Mahadev Mandir

=== C ===
1. Chandeshwar Nath Mahadev Mandir
2. Chhireshwar Nath Mahadev Mandir

=== D ===
1. Dakshineswar Nath Mahadev Mandir
2. Dhaneshwar Nath Mahadev Mandir

=== E ===
1. Ekadash Rudra Mahadev Mandir

=== G ===
1. Gandiveshwar Sthan
2. Gangeshwar Mahadev Mandir

=== H ===
1. Haleshwar Sthan
2. Hareshwar Nath Mahadev Mandir
3. Hariharnath Mahadev Mandir
4. Harinandeshwar Mahadev Mandir

=== I ===
1. Ishannath Mandir

=== J ===
1. Jaleshwar Nath Mahadev Mandir

=== K ===
1. Kalyaneshwar Mahadev Mandir
2. Kapileshwar Sthan Mandir, Bihar
3. Kapileshwar Mahadev Mandir, Garhbaruari
4. Kapileshwar Mahadev Mandir, Janakpur
5. Khudneshwar Asthan Morwa
6. Kusheshwar Asthan Mahadev Mandir

=== L ===
1. Lokeshwar Nath Mahadev Mandir

=== M ===
1. Madhaweshwar Nath Mahadev Mandir
2. Madhveshwar Nath Mahadev Mandir, Darbhanga
3. Mankeshwar Nath Mahadev Mandir
4. Manokamna Mandir
5. Mittheswarnath Shiv Temple
6. Mukteshwar Nath Mahadev Mandir

=== N ===
1. Nageshwar Nath Mahadev Mandir
2. Narmadeshwar Nath Mahadev Mandir

=== P ===
1. Pancheshwar Nath Mahadev Mandir
2. Panchmukhi Mahadev Sthan
3. Pundakeshwar Mahadev Mandir

=== S ===
1. Sapteshwar Nath Mahadev Mandir
2. Saraswarnath Mahadev Mandir
3. Shilanath Mahadev Mandir
4. Shringeshwar Mahadev Mandir
5. Shukeshwar Nath Mahadev Mandir
6. Singheshwar Sthan
7. Sundernath Mahadev Mandir

=== T ===
1. Trilokinath Mahadev Mandir

=== U ===
1. Ugna Mahadev Mandir, Bhawanipur

=== V ===
1. Vachaspati Nath Mahadev Mandir
2. Valmikeshwar Nath Mahadev Mandir
3. Varameshwarnath Mahadev Mandir
4. Vardhmaneshwar Nath Mahadev Mandir
5. Videshwarnath Mahadev Mandir
6. Vidyapati Dham Mandir
