= Baba Maneshwarnath Mahadev Mandir =

Lord Shiva temple in Mithila

- बाबा मानेश्वरनाथ महादेव मंदिर

Religion
- Affiliation: Hinduism
- District: Sitamarhi
- Deity: Lord Shiva
- Governing body: Shree Shree 108 Shree Baba Maneshwar Nath Mahadev Mandir Nyasa Samiti

Location
- Location: Maneshwarnath Sthan, near Yadupatti Bazar, Simiahi
- State: Bihar
- Country: India
- Interactive map of Baba Maneshwarnath Mahadev Mandir
- Coordinates: 26.5914509°N 85.7815816°E

Baba Maneshwarnath Mahadev Mandir (Maithili: बाबा मानेश्वरनाथ महादेव मंदिर) is a Hindu temple dedicated Lord Shiva in the Mithila region. It is located at Simiahi village near Yadupatti Bazar in the Charaut block of the Sitamarhi district in the state of Bihar in India. It is connected by National Highway 227 (formally known as NH 104) with different parts of the country. It is located at distance of 45 kilometers north-east of the district headquarter. The founder and foundation time of the temple is unknown but the people of the region believe that the Shivalinga of the temple is very ancient and was established in ancient times.

== Description ==
The Shivalinga of the temple is situated at 10 feet below the ground level of the Garbhagriha in the temple. It is called as Baba Maneshwarnath Mahadev Shivalinga.

During the festival of Shravan Sombari in Hinduism, a large number of devotees flock here to perform the sacred Jalabhisheka rituals on the Shivalinga of the temple.

== History ==
According to the people of the village, it is said that decades ago, this place was called as Maniyari. During an excavation, a Shivalinga was discovered here from the ground, after that the name of the location was changed from Maniyari to Maneshwarnath Sthan.
