= Kapileshwar Temple =

Kapileshwar Temple may refer to:

- Kapilesvara Siva Temple, a Hindu temple in Bhubaneswar, Odisha, India
- Kapileshwar Temple, Bihar, a Hindu temple in Bihar, India
- Kapileshwar Temple, Janakpur, a Hindu temple in Janakpur, Nepal
- Kapileshwar Mahadev Mandir at Garhbaruari village in Supaul district.

== See also ==
- Kapileswarapuram (disambiguation)
- Kapaleeshwarar Temple, a Hindu temple in Tamil Nadu, India
- Kapilash Temple, a Hindu temple in Dhenkanal, Odisha, India
