= Jaleshwar Mahadev Temple =

Shiva temple in Nepal

- जलेश्वर महादेव मन्दिर
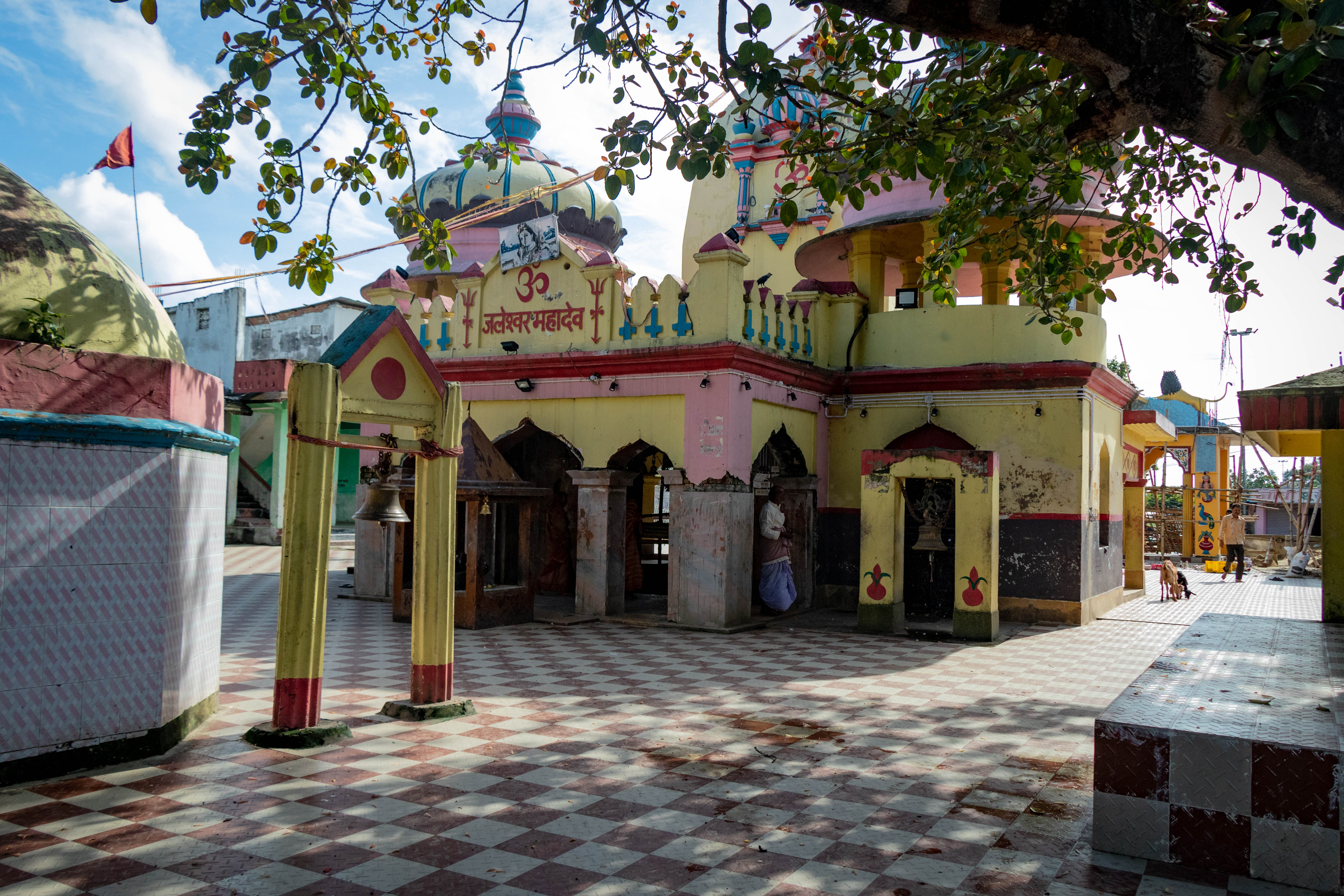

- Location of temple Jaleshwar Mahadev Temple (Nepal)

Religion
- Affiliation: Hinduism
- District: Mahottari
- Province: Madhesh Province
- Deity: Shiva
- Festivals: Mahashivaratri and Basant Panchami

Location
- Country: Nepal
- Interactive map of Jaleshwar Mahadev Temple
- Coordinates: 26.651107°N 85.796785°E

Architecture
- Type: Gumbaz

Jaleshwar Mahadev Temple (Nepali: जलेश्वर महादेव मन्दिर) is a Hindu temple of Shiva situated at Mahottari district, Nepal. Pilgrims visit this temple on Maha Shivaratri and Vasant Panchami. The city of Jaleshwar where this temple is located is named after this temple.

Records indicate that the temple was in existence since the time of King Janak. It is believed that during the marriage between Rama and Sita, soil was taken from this temple. A copper inscription in the temple indicates that to administer the temple, in 1869 BS (1812–1813) AD, King Girvan Yuddha Bikram Shah provided 275 bighas of land.

The temple is built in Gumbaja architecture style. A square Shiva Linga, submerged in water, lies at the center of the main temple. There is a pond near the temple.

In the year of 1200 BS (1143 AD), the then Mahant of this temple installed a bell at the main gate of the temple Ishannath Mandir at Damani village of the Belsand block in the Sitamarhi district of Bihar in India.

== Gallery ==
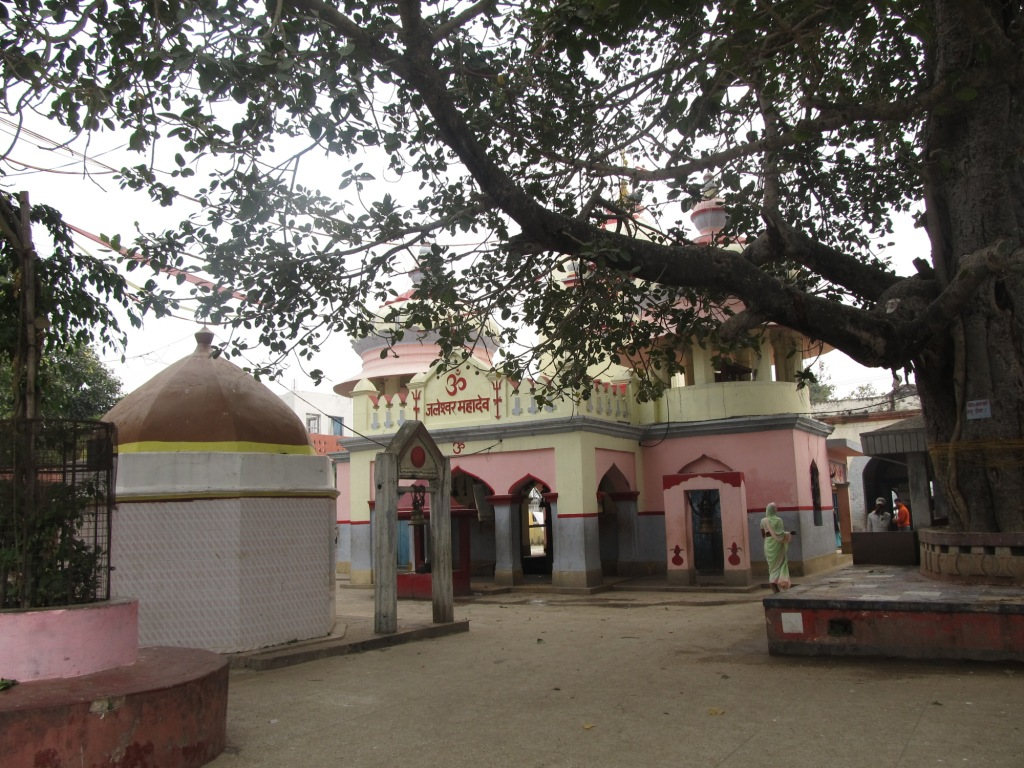
Main temple

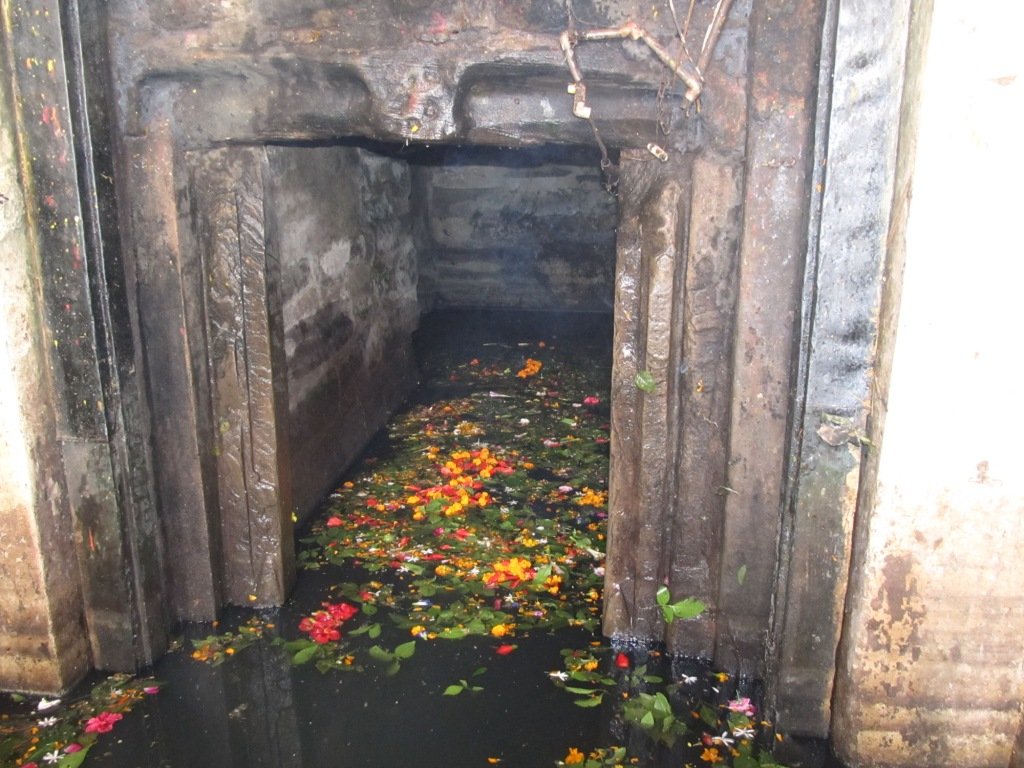
Shiva Linga in water

== See also ==
- List of Hindu temples in Nepal
- List of Shiva temples in Mithila
