= Chandeshwar Nath Mahadev Mandir =

Temple in Mithila, Bihar

- चन्देश्वर नाथ महादेव मंदिर
- View of the Chandeshwar Nath Mahadev Mandir in the Harari village.

Religion
- Affiliation: Hinduism
- District: Madhubani district
- Deity: Lord Shiva

Location
- Location: Harari village
- State: Bihar
- Country: India

Architecture
- Style: Tirhut style
- Site area: Chandeshwar Sthan

Chandeshwar Nath Mahadev Mandir (Maithili: चन्देश्वर नाथ महादेव मंदिर) is a historically ancient Hindu temple in the Mithila region of Bihar. It is dedicated to Lord Shiva in Hinduism. It located at Harari village in the Andhra Thadi block of the Madhubani district in Bihar. The location of the temple is locally known as Chandeshwar Sthan. It is a historical heritage of region. The Shivalinga of the temple is situated here in the Garbhagriha, approximately ten feet below the ground level.

== Etymology ==
The term Chandeshwar either have been derived from the name of the Shiva Gana Chand Bhairava or from the name of the Maithil scholar Chandeshwar Thakur.

== Legend ==
There is a legendary story of the temple related to Lord Shiva and his Shiva Gana Chand Bhairava. The legend is detailed in the book Chandeshwar Suprabhat Stotram. It was written by the former head of Sanskrit department Dr Mahesh Jha at the T M Bhagalpur University in Bihar.

According to the legend, it is said that once Chanda quarrel with Lord Shiva and hid himself here after the quarrel. This is why the place was also known as Hardi and later it also came to be known as Harari village. The Shiva Gana Chand Bhairava installed a Shivalinga here and used to perform Jalabhisheka on it.

== History ==
Some historians believe that Chandeshwar Thakur, the grandfather of the great Maithili poet Vidyapati, built the Shiva temple here for the first time. And the present structure of the temple was built by Maharaja of Raj Darbhanga.
