= Ishannath Mandir =

Ancient Shiva temple in Mithila

- ईशाननाथ मंदिर
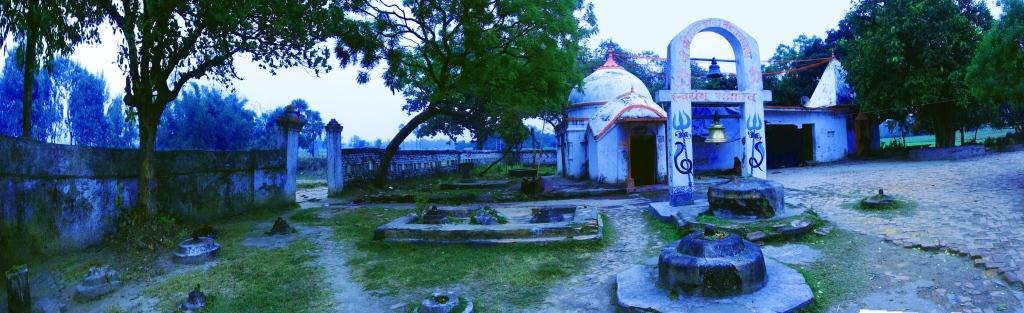
- The campus of Ishannath Mahadev Mandir at Damami village

Religion
- Affiliation: Hinduism
- District: Sitamarhi district
- Deity: Lord Shiva
- Festivals: Mahashivratri, Sawan Sombari, Basant Panchami

Location
- Location: Damami Village, Mithila region
- State: Bihar
- Country: India
- Interactive map of Ishannath Mandir
- Coordinates: 26.4552685°N 85.4363300°E

Architecture
- Established: Treta Yuga
- Ancient Shiva temple related to Ramayana

Ishannath Mandir (Maithili: ईशाननाथ मंदिर) is an ancient temple dedicated to Lord Shiva in the Mithila region of the Indian subcontinent. It is located at Damami Village of Lohasi Panchayat in the Belsand block of the Sitamarhi district in Bihar, India. It is also known as Damami Matha. The Shivalinga of the temple is also called as Swayambhu Mahadev and Pataleshwar Mahadev. It is locally also called as Baba Ishannath Mahadev. The temple is related to Ramayana. According to legend, it is said that Lord Rama's procession took rest here while going back to Ayodhya from Janakpur.

== History ==
In the year 1200 BS (Bikram Sambat) or 1143 AD, the then Mahant of Jaleshwar Nath Mahadev Mandir, installed a bell at the main gate of the Ishannath Mandir. After that the temple was looked after by the descendants of that Mahant. Presently the 29th generation of the Mahant is looking after the temple.
