= Baba Mukteshwar Dham =

Baba Mukteshwar Nath Mahadev Mandir
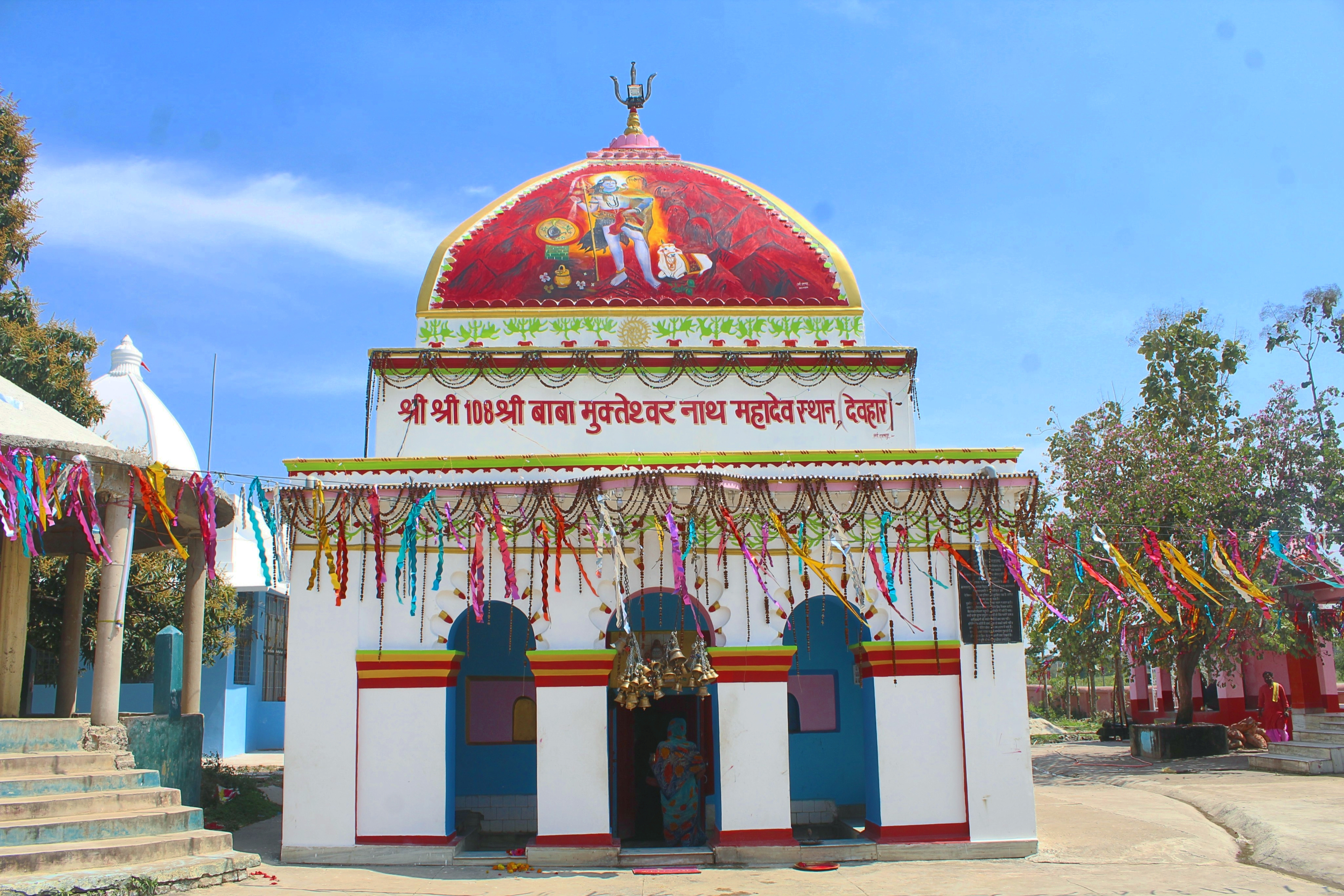
- View of the Shree Shree 108 Shree Baba Mukteshwar Nath Mahadev Mandir.

- Location in Main Bihar

Religion
- Affiliation: Hinduism
- District: Madhubani
- Deity: Shiva
- Festivals: Shivaratri, Baisakhi, Navratri, Somvati Amavasya
- Governing body: Bihar State Board of Religious Trusts

Location
- State: Bihar
- Country: India
- Interactive map of Baba Mukteshwar Nath Mahadev Mandir
- Coordinates: 26.148960675°N 85.9103526876°E

Architecture
- Type: Tirhut style

Website
- https://babamukteshwarnath.in

Baba Mukteshwarnath Dham is a Hindu temple dedicated to Shiva in the village of Deohar in the Indian state of Bihar. Baba Mukteshwarnath Dham is considered as one of the best temples in Deohar, Bihar.

== Location ==
Baba Mukteshwarnath Dham is situated in Deohar village of Andhrathari block under Madhubani district in the Indian state of Bihar.

== History ==
It is believed that the Mukteshwar Nath temple was built around 200 years ago.

Researchers have found some artifacts of archaeological importance at the site. One finding was a Shivling, which was re-sanctified for use by worshipers. Excavations also found an idol of Ganesh and Parvati, which was installed in the Parvati temple.

== Tourism ==
From all across the district as well as state, devotees come here to pray for their better life ahead. This temple is the best place for holy expeditions and tourists.

== See also ==
- List of Hindu temples in India
- List of Shiva temples in Mithila
