= Varameshwarnath Mahadev Mandir =

Lord Shiva temple in Mithila

- वरमेश्वरनाथ महादेव मंदिर

Religion
- Affiliation: Hinduism
- District: Sitamarhi
- Deity: Lord Shiva

Location
- Location: Varma village, Charaut Block
- State: Bihar
- Country: India
- Interactive map of Varameshwarnath Mahadev Mandir
- Coordinates: 26.5220756°N 85.7737774°E

Varameshwarnath Mahadev Mandir (Maithili: वरमेश्वरनाथ महादेव मंदिर) is a Hindu temple of Lord Shiva in the Mithila region. It is located at the Varma village of the Charaut block in the Sitamarhi district of Bihar in India. It is also called as Barmeshwar Nath Mandir. During the festival of Sawan Sombari, a huge number of devotees flock towards the temple for performing the sacred ritual Jalabhisheka on the Shivalinga of the temple.
