= Kapileswarapuram =

Kapileswarapuram may refer to:

- Kapileswarapuram, Krishna district, a village in Andhra Pradesh, India
- Kapileswarapuram, East Godavari district, a village in Andhra Pradesh, India
- Kapileswarapuram mandal, mandal in Konaseema district, Andhra Pradesh, India

== See also ==
- Kapileshwar Temple (disambiguation)
