= Tirhut style temples =

Architecture style of Mithila

Tirhut style temples also called Tirhut types temples or Tirhut temples refers to the indigenous style of temples architecture in the Mithila region of the Indian subcontinent. It was categorised by the American archeologist David Brainerd Spooner after his survey in the region during the British Raj era. These temples were built by the kings of the Mithila region.

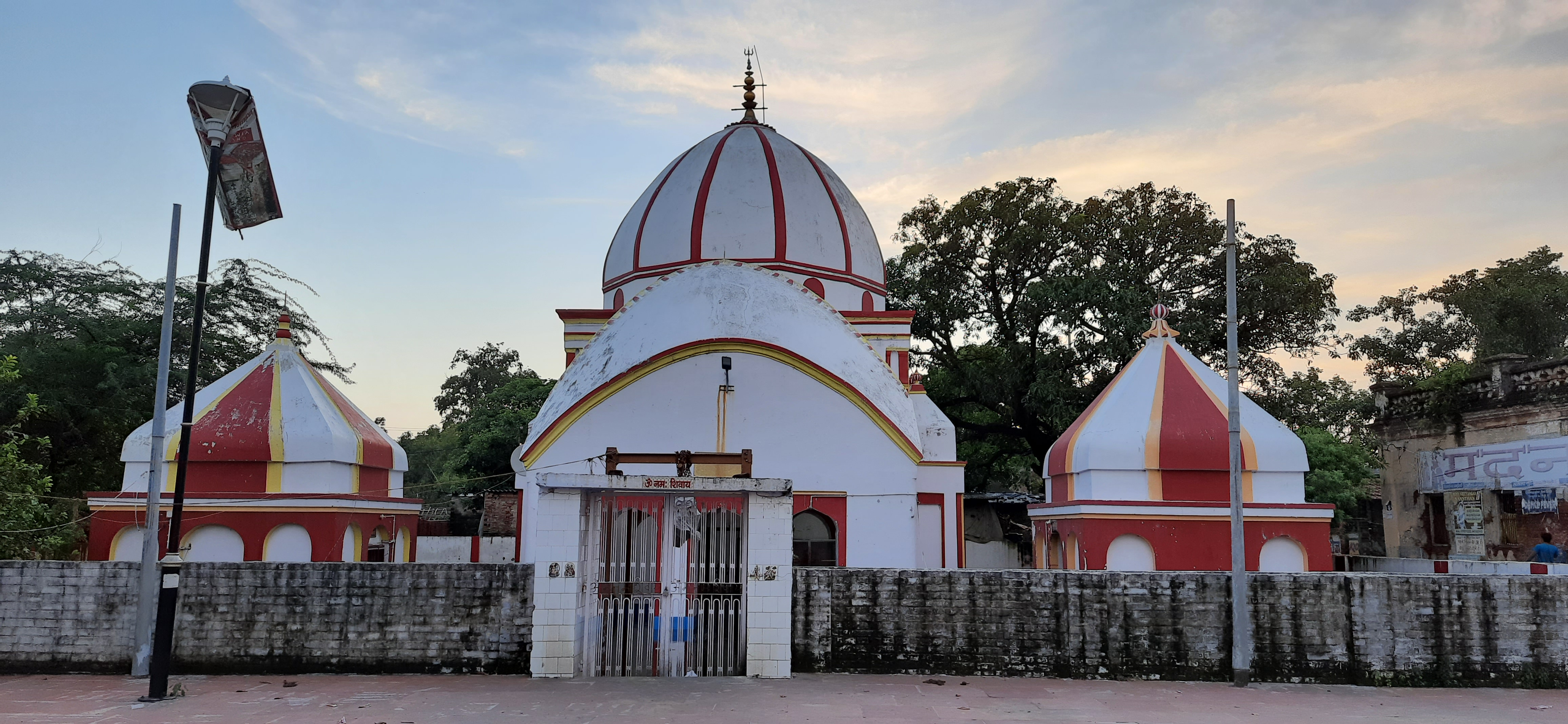
View of the Tirhut style temple of the Madhveshwar Nath Mahadev Mandir in the historical city of Darbhanga in Mithila.

In the 1916, D B Spooner studied the type of temples in the region. In his studies, he found a rhythm in the architectural aspect of the construction of the temples buildings in the region. He noted that the temples were square shaped. The walls of these temples were perfectly plain and undecorated. The surfaces of the walls and roof were equally painted without any decoration carving. The roofs of the temples were sloped.

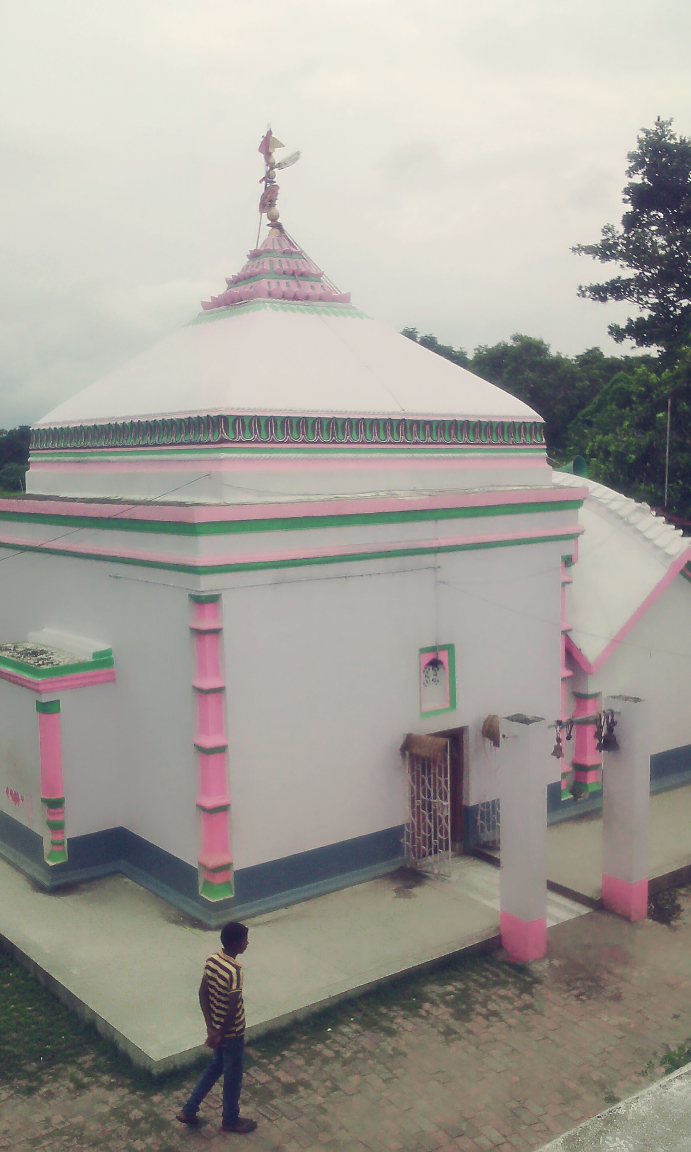
View of a Tirhut style temples at Videshwar Sthan.

In the field of architecture, Mithila's temples construction displays its uniqueness. Almost every king of Mithila commissioned large-scale temple construction in the region. The colonial archeologist D B Spooner recognised the uniqueness and called Tirhut style. Several temples of the Tirhut art style are preserved at different places in the region. David Brainerd Spooner documented several other examples of temples architecture in the Saran area also that may include the Krishna temple at Mairow Dih in Chhapra, the Radha-ji temple at Jagdispur, the Ramji Mandir at Banora, the Panch Mandir at Chainpur, Hara Mandir at Bagada and Kamalashvarnath Temple at Triveni in Champaran.

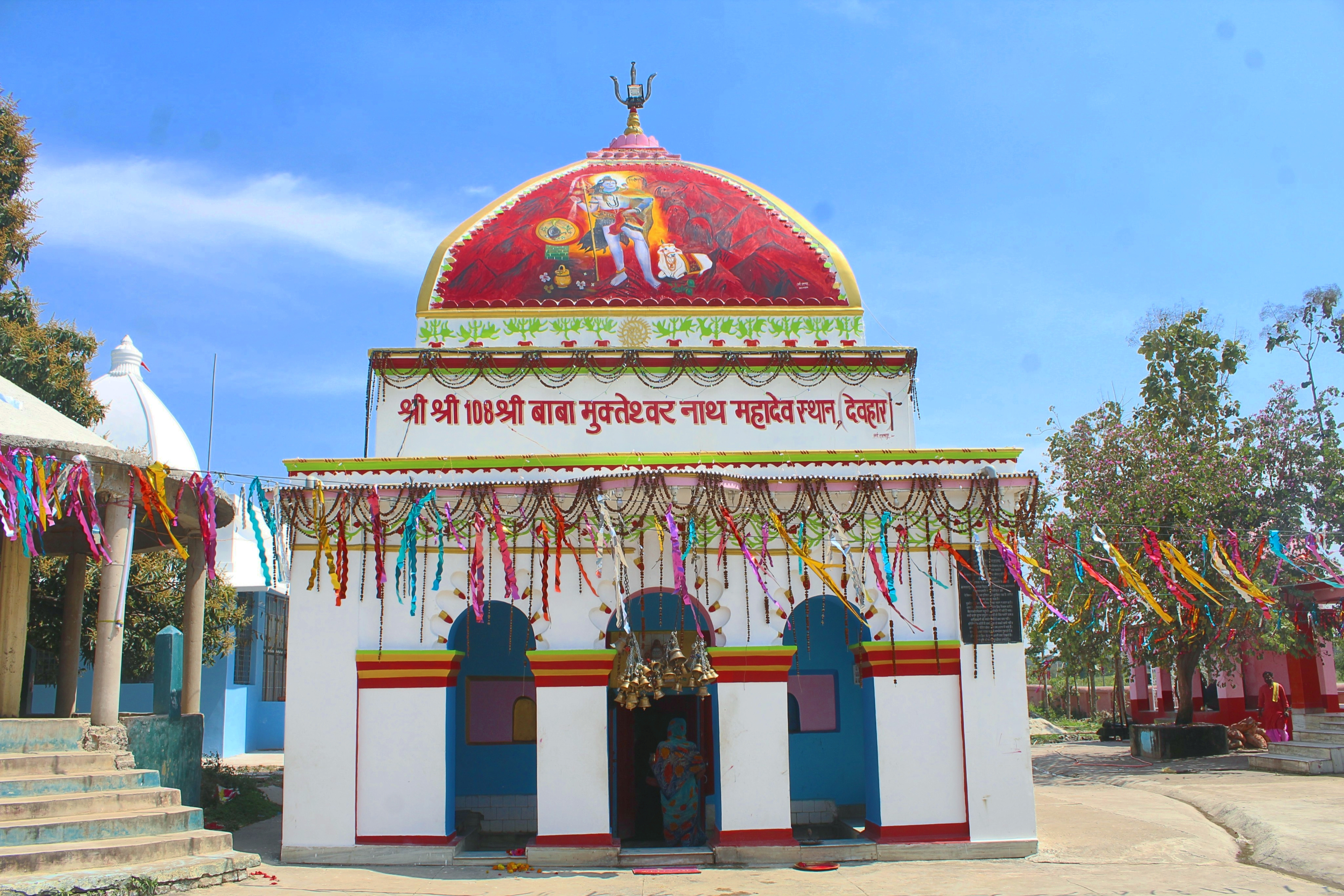
Tirhut types temple of Baba Mukteshwar Nath Mahadev Mandir at the Deohar village in the Madhubani district of the Mithila region.

== Etymology ==
The Tirhut style of temples was prevalent in the "Tirhut region , i.e. , Mithila which borders on Nepal". The etymology of the temples style carries the cultural legacy of the Tirhut name of the Mithila region in the Indian subcontinent that spans upto some Terai region in Nepal.

== Characterisation ==
D B Spooner characterised the Tirhut type temples as utilitarian in character. The temple has a small square room that contains image or sculpture of the deities. It has narrow portico. The Tirhut type temple has a shikhara. According to Spooner, the style of the shikharas of the Tirhut type temples are free from the influence of Odisha models as well as Benares type Bengal temple.

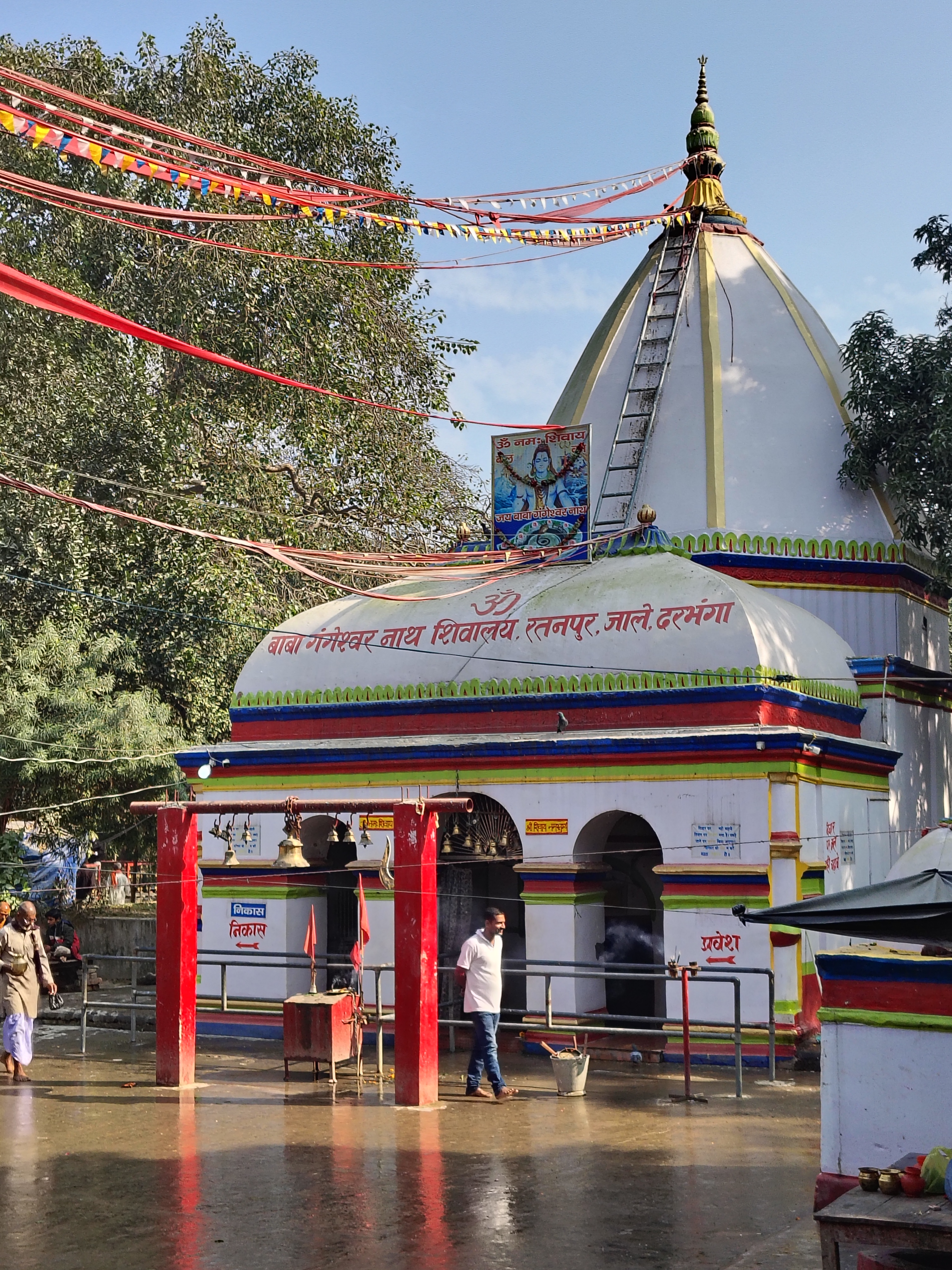
View of the Shikhara of the Baba Gangeshwar Nath Mahadev Mandir in the Darbhanga district.

The Tirhut style of temple is essentially tripartite in structure. It typically comprises cella (sanctum), tower, and porch (veranda). The porch is a later addition to the structure.

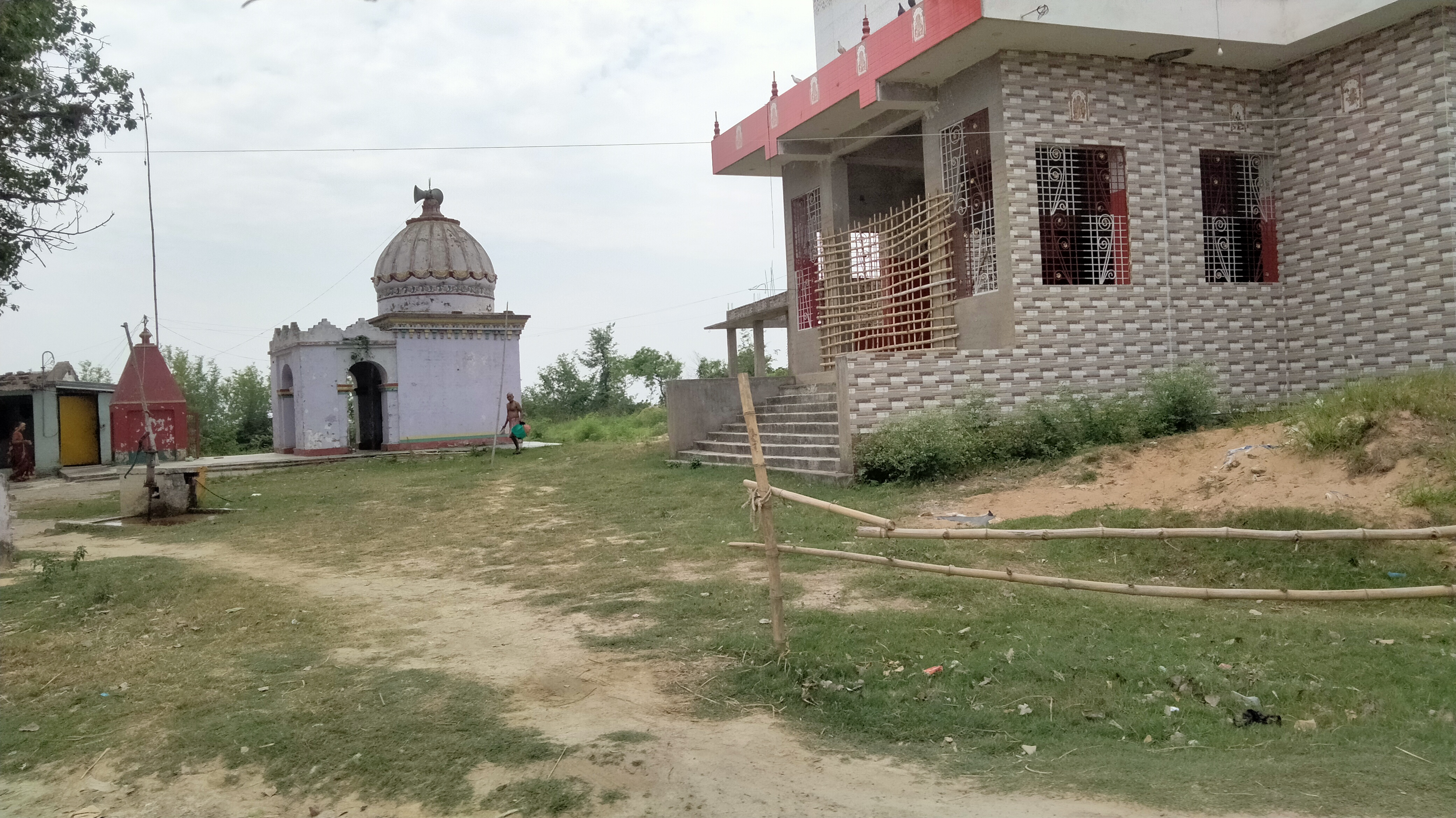
View of a dome shaped roof (tower) on the Basbaria Mahadev Mandir near Saharghat village in the Madhwapur block.
