= Panchmukhi Mahadev Sthan =

Lord Shiva temple in Mithila

- पंचमुखी महादेव स्थान

Religion
- Affiliation: Hinduism
- District: Madhubani
- Deity: Lord Shiva
- Festival: Narak Nivaran Chaturdashi

Location
- Location: Pursaulia panchayat, Kaluahi block, Mithila region
- State: Bihar
- Country: India
- Associated with the King Virata of Mahabharata

Panchmukhi Mahadev Sthan (Maithili: पंचमुखी महादेव स्थान) is a legendary shrine dedicated to Lord Shiva in the Mithila region of the Indian subcontinent. It is located in the western side of the Pursaulia panchayat in the Kaluahi block of the Madhubani district in Bihar. It is two kilometers away from the Bardepur Ganesh Chowk on National Highway India 105 passing through the region. The local legend link the temple associated with the King Virata in Mahabharata. The temple of Lord Shiva is known as Panchmukh Shivling Mahadev Mandir. In the region of Mithila, it is popular for performing the sacred Jalabhisheka on Shivalinga during the festival of Shravan Sombari. Similarly, the Narak Nivaran Chaturdashi in Hinduism is a major festival of the temple.
