= Saraswarnath Mahadev Mandir =

Ancient Shiva temple in Mithila

- सारस्वरनाथ महादेव मन्दिर

Religion
- Affiliation: Hinduism
- District: Siraha
- Province: Madhesh Pradesh
- Deity: Lord Shiva

Location
- Location: Sarashwar
- Country: Nepal
- Interactive map of Saraswarnath Mahadev Mandir
- Coordinates: 26.6839436°N 86.2022706°E

Architecture
- Style: Tirhut style

Saraswarnath Mahadev Mandir (Maithili: सारस्वरनाथ महादेव मन्दिर) is an ancient and legendary temple of Lord Shiva in the Mithila region of the Indian subcontinent. It is located at Saraswar village in the Siraha district of Madhesh Pradesh province in Nepal. The Hindu adherents believe the temple as the dwarpaal (gatekeeper) in the eastern direction of the Janaki Mandir.

== Description ==
The ancient Saraswarnath Mahadev Mandir is located on the eastern bank of the Kamala river in the ward no 12 of the Siraha Municipality.
