= Vardhmaneshwar Nath Mahadev Mandir =

Lord Shiva temple in Mithila

- वर्धमानेश्वर नाथ महादेव मंदिर
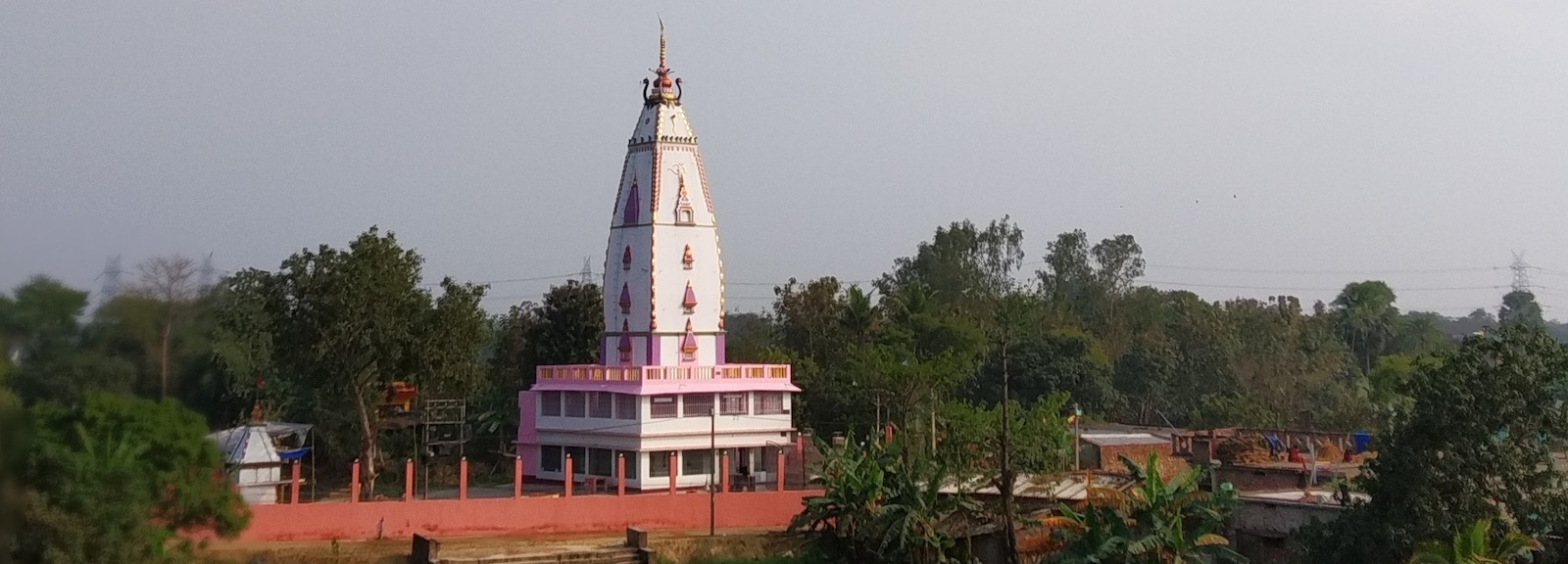
- View of the Vardhmaneshwar Nath Mahadev Mandir

Religion
- Affiliation: Hinduism
- District: Darbhanga
- Deity: Lord Shiva
- Festival: Mahashivratri

Location
- Location: Dekuli
- State: Bihar
- Country: India
- Interactive map of Vardhmaneshwar Nath Mahadev Mandir
- Coordinates: 26.0858410°N 85.9225820°E

Architecture
- Founder: Vardhman Upadhyay
- Established: 14th century CE

Vardhmaneshwar Nath Mahadev Mandir (Maithili: वर्धमानेश्वर नाथ महादेव मंदिर) is a Hindu temple in the Mithila region dedicated to Lord Shiva. It is located at Devakuli village of the Darbhanga district in the state of Bihar in India. It is named after the Maithil scholar Vardhman Upadhyay, a Navaratna at the court of King Shivasimha in Mithila. The history of the temple is traced back since 14th century CE in the region. The location of the temple has archeological importance. It is also known as Bardhmaneshwar Nath Mahadev Mandir.
