= Basbaria Mahadev Mandir =

Shiva temple in Mithila

- बसबरिया महादेव मंदिर
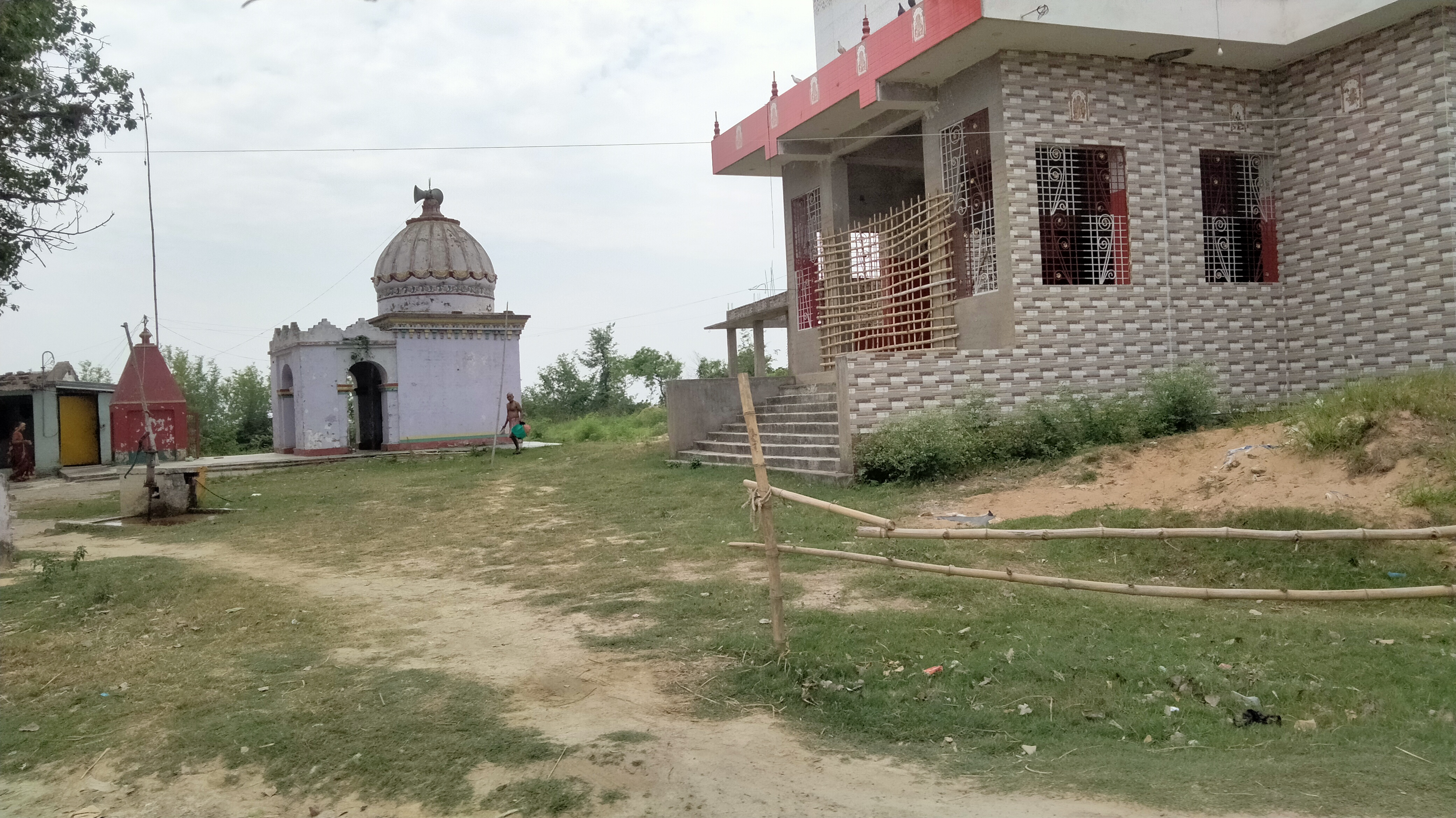
- View of the Basbaria Mahadev Mandir

Religion
- Affiliation: Hinduism
- District: Madhubani district
- Deity: Lord Shiva
- Festivals: Mahashivratri, Sawan Sombari, Narak Nivaran Chaturdashi

Location
- Location: Basbaria Village near Saharghat, Madhwapur block Mithila region
- State: Bihar
- Country: India
- Interactive map of Basbaria Mahadev Mandir
- Coordinates: 26.5213487°N 85.8610742°E

Architecture
- Style: Tirhut style

Basbaria Mahadev Mandir (Maithili: बसबरिया महादेव मंदिर) is a Hindu temple dedicated to Lord Shiva in the Mithila region of Bihar in India. It is located at Basbaria village of the Madhwapur block in the Madhubani district. It is situated on the road side of the highway Madhwapur-Benipatti via Uchchaith Road. The temple is also known as Basbaria Shiv Mandir.

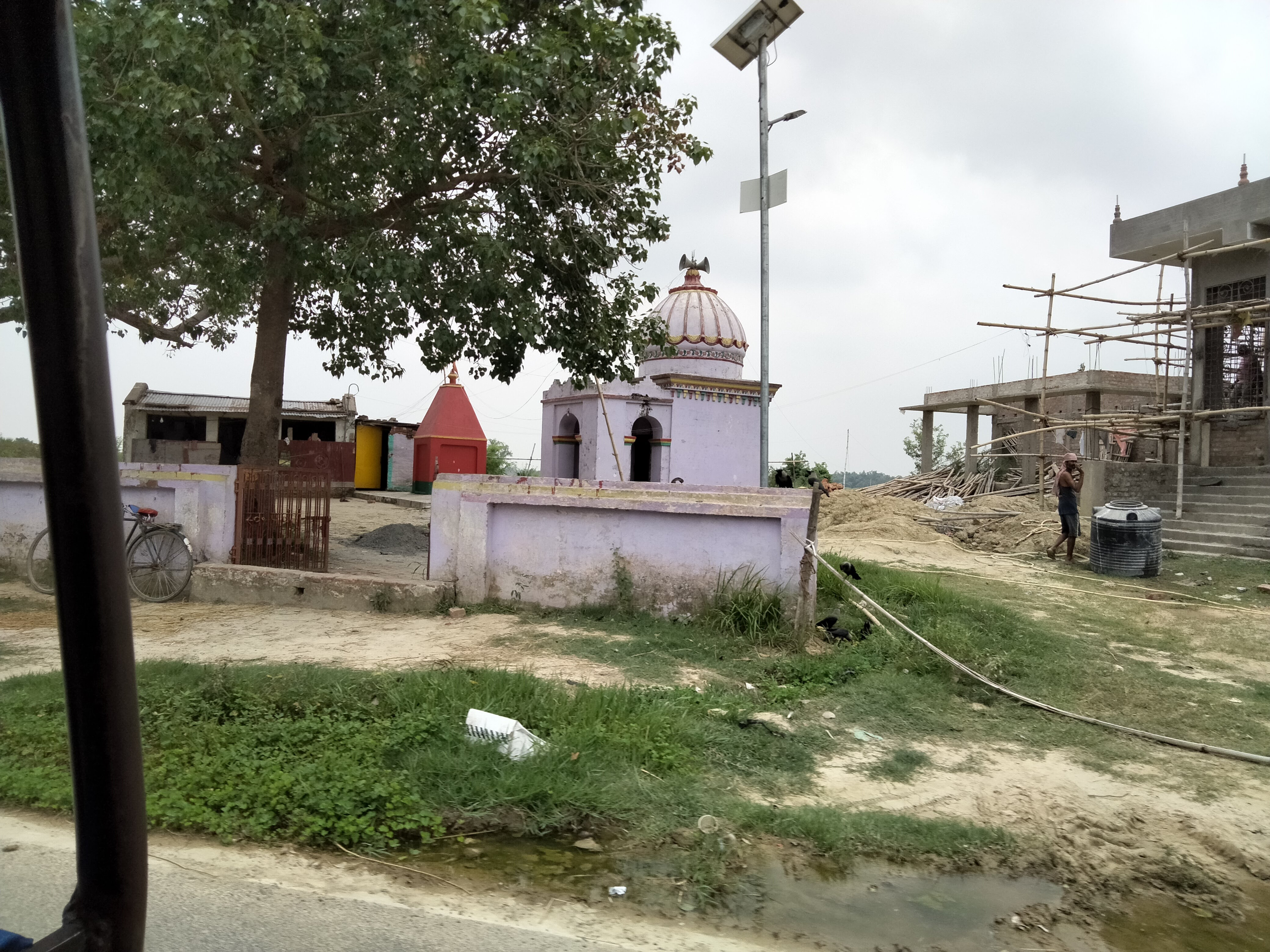
View of the Basbaria Mahadev Mandir from the highway near the temple.

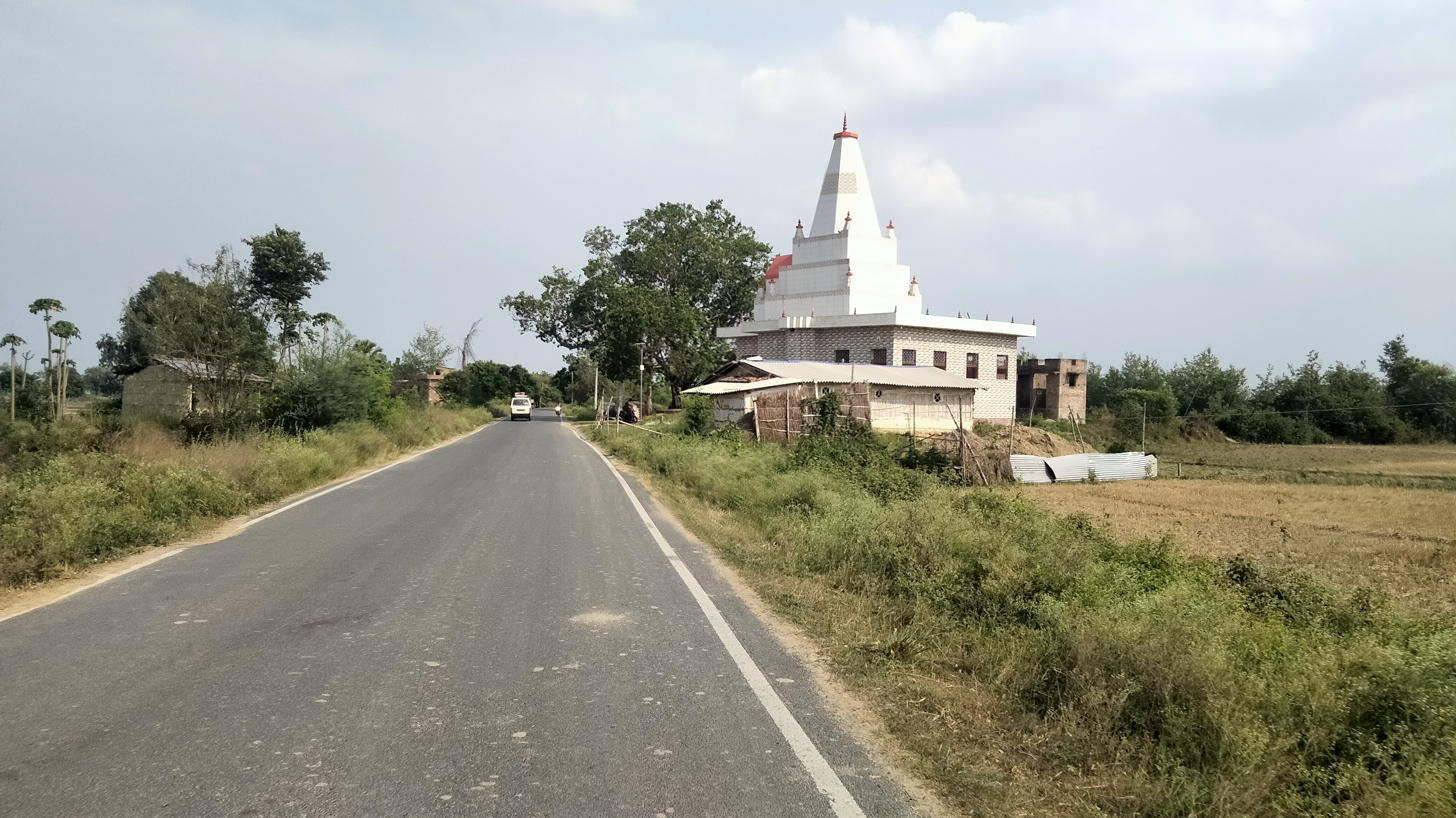
View of new temple at the campus of Basbaria Mahadev Mandir
