= Adbhutanath Mahadev Mandir =

13th century Shiva temple in Mithila

- अद्भुतनाथ महादेव मंदिर

Religion
- Affiliation: Hinduism
- District: Sitamarhi district
- Deity: Lord Shiva
- Festivals: Mahashivratri, Sawan Sombari

Location
- Location: Anahari Dham, Mithila region
- State: Bihar
- Country: India
- Interactive map of Adbhutanath Mahadev Mandir
- Coordinates: 26.5692199°N 85.4262808°E

Architecture
- Established: 1288 AD

Adbhutanath Mahadev Mandir (Maithili: अद्भुतनाथ महादेव मंदिर) is a 13th century temple dedicated to Lord Shiva in the Mithila region of the Indian subcontinent. It is located at Anahari Dham in the Sitamarhi district of Bihar in India. It was built during the period of the 13th century CE. The Shivalinga of the temple was made by joining two celestial stones fallen from the sky at two different villages near the present temple. Since the divine stones came from the sky, so the Shivalinga is also known as Baba Adbhutanath Aakash Margi Mahadev.

== History ==
According to the priest Roshan Jha of the temple and the villager Ramesh Kumar, Once a day in the year 1288 CE at morning, it rained with thunder. Then a celestial stone was seen falling towards the earth and soon the celestial stone broke into two parts before it fell on the earth. One part of the celestial stone fell in Anahari village and the other part in the fields of Rewasi village in the Sitamarhi district. After that it became dark during the day. It is said that Lord Shiva appeared in the dream of a Brahmin of Ransambha. And Lord Shiva said to join the two pieces of the celestial stone. After that the villagers joined the two pieces of the celestial stone and started worshipping the joined celestial stone as Shivalinga. The village was earlier known as Ujiarpur but during the fall of the celestial stone, the day became dark, so later it was called Anahari village. The term Anahari is associated with the darkness, so the village was later called as Anahari. The worship in the temple started from the year 1288 CE.
