= Yadupatti =

Village in Bihar

- Village
- Flag

- Country: India
- State: Bihar
- District: Sitamarhi
- Block: Choraut
- Language: Maithili, Hindi

Yadupatti is an Indian village in the Mithila region of Bihar. This village is about 37 kilometres away from its district headquarters Sitamarhi. It is about 4 kilometres away from Bhitthamore.
