= Videshwarnath Mahadev Mandir =

Lord Shiva temple in Mithila

- विदेश्वरनाथ महादेव मंदिर
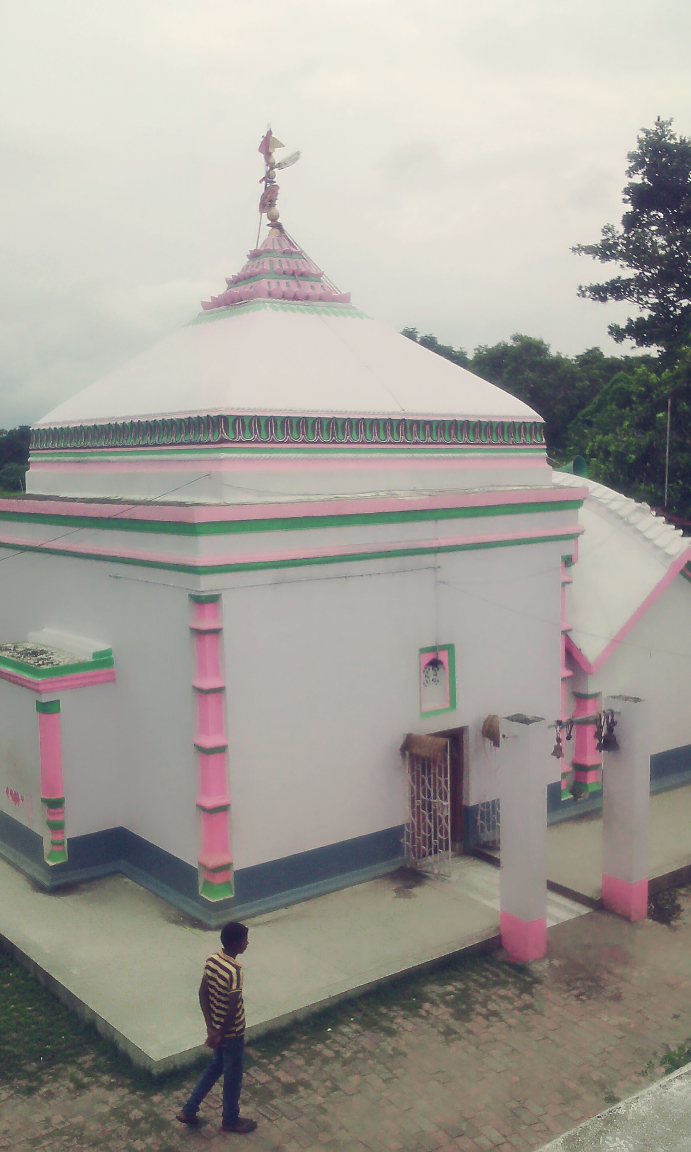
- Videshwarnath Mahadev Mandir

Religion
- Affiliation: Hinduism
- District: Madhubani district
- Deity: Lord Shiva

Location
- Location: Videshwar Sthan, Mithila region
- State: Bihar
- Country: India

Architecture
- Architect: Renovation (1300 CE)
- Type: Tirhut art style
- Founder: King Janaka
- Established: Treta Yuga
- Inscriptions: Mithilakshara Scripts
- Lord Shiva temple associated with Videha King Janaka: Videshwar translates to "Lord of Videha"

Videshwarnath Mahadev Mandir (Maithili: विदेश्वरनाथ महादेव मंदिर) is a Hindu temple dedicated to Lord Shiva in the Mithila region of Bihar in India. It is located at Videshwar village of the Jhanjharpur block in the Madhubani district. It situated along Videshwar Machaita road near Jhanjharpur Darbhanga State Highway. According to legend, the temple is believed to be associated with the legendary King Janaka of the ancient Videha Kingdom in the Indian subcontinent. It has been recognised as a tourist destinations for Hindu pilgrimage. It is also called as Baba Bideshwar Sthan.

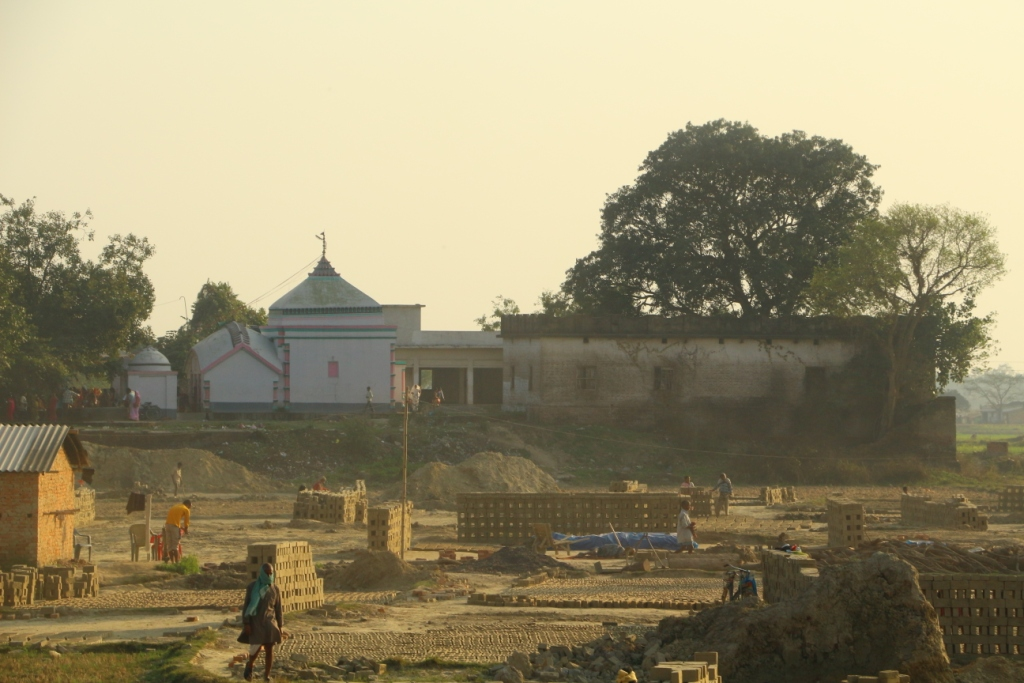
View of the premises of the Videshwarnath Mahadev Mandir from backside

== Etymology ==
According to legend, it is speculated that the temple may have been named Videshwarnath Mahadev Mandir due to its connection with the King of Videha. In ancient time, the kingdom of Mithila was called as Videha. Some times the King Janaka of Mithila is also called as King Videha. The name of the temple is derived from the word Videha. The literal meaning of Videshwar is Lord of Videha.

== History ==
Videshwarnath Mahadev Mandir is an ancient temple connected to the King Janaka of Videha. The present architecture of the temple was renovated during 1300 AD. There is an inscription on the temple written in Mithilakshara scripts. The inscription on the temple in Mithilakshara indicates that the temple was renovated in 1300 AD.

== Description ==
Videshwarnath Mahadev Mandir is famous for organising Shravani Mela in the area. A huge number of devotees flock to the temple during the Shravani Mela.
