= Saharghat, Madhubani =

Semi urban panchayat in Madhubani district

Saharghat Sahar
- Village
- Sahar Uttar and Sahar Dakshin Panchayat
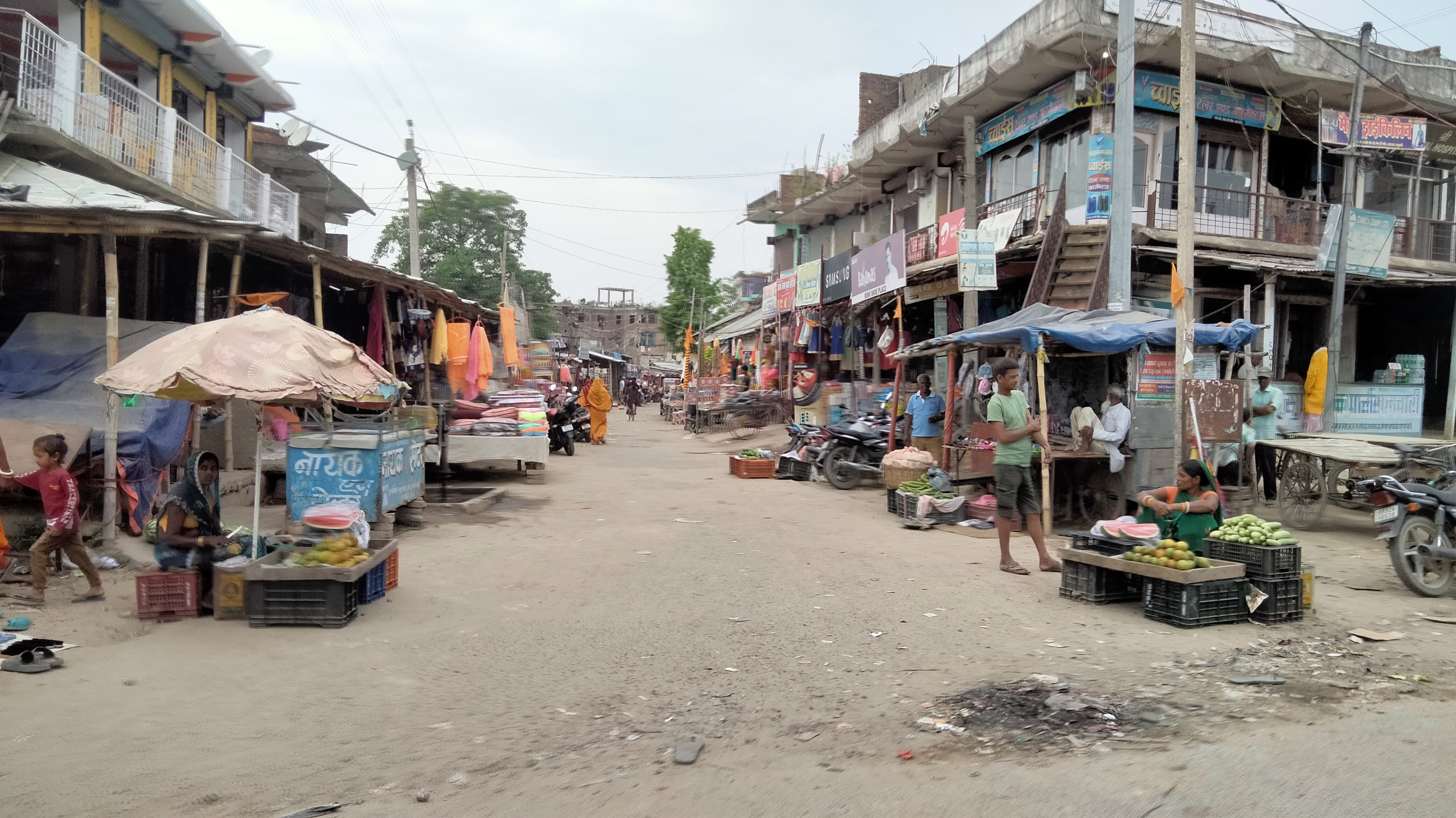
- View of Netaji Chowk at Saharghat
- Interactive map of Saharghat
- Coordinates: 26.5430734°N 85.8575803°E
- Sub Divisional office: Benipatti
- Block Headquarter: Madhwapur
- Country: India
- State: Bihar
- Region: Mithila region
- District: Madhubani district
- Seat: Bihar State Government

Government
  - Type: State Government
  - Body: Gram panchayat

Population (2011)
  - Total: 14,368
- Demonym: Maithil

Languages
  - Official language: Mother language: Hindi; Maithili
- Pin Code: 847308

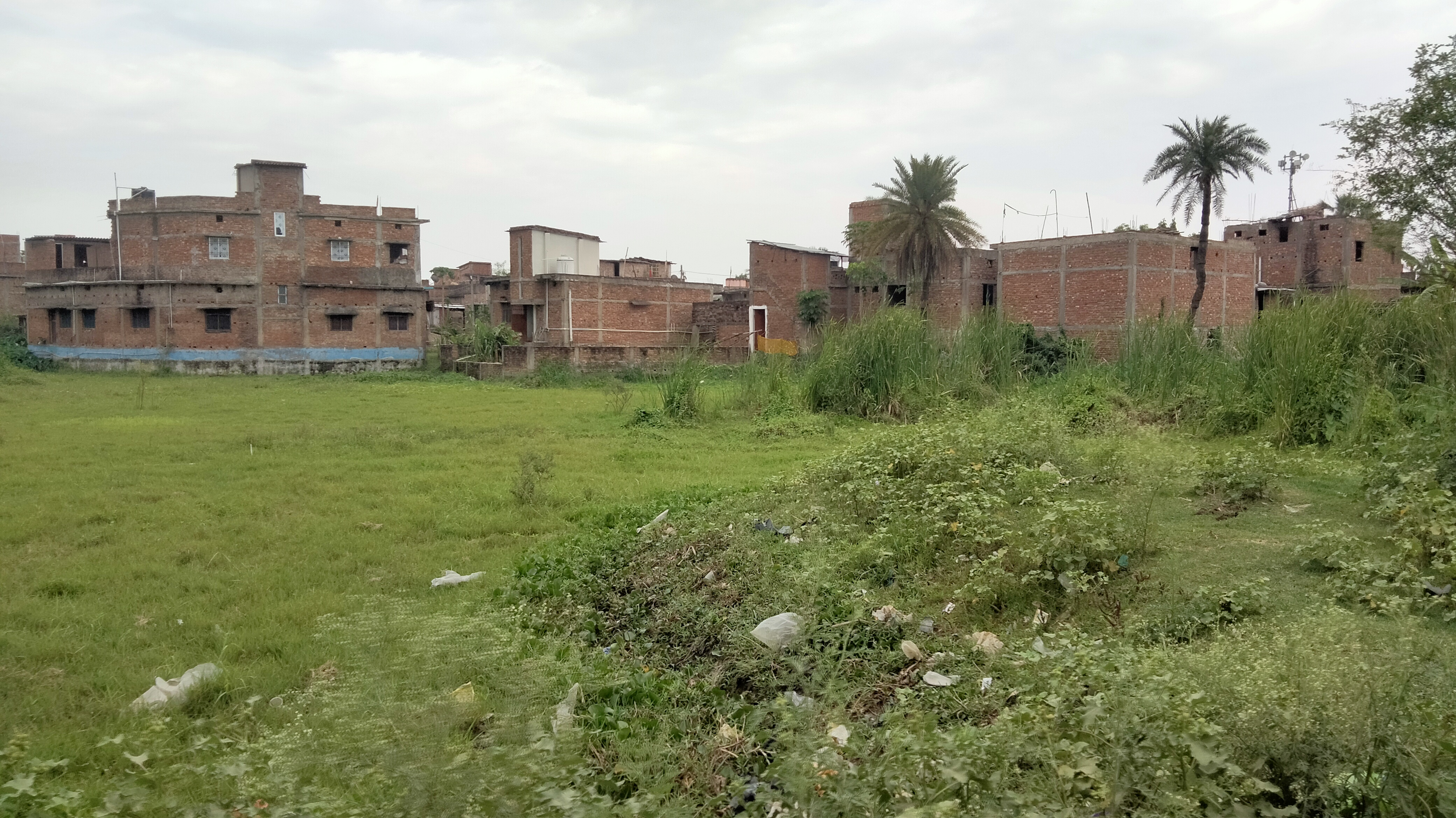
View of Saharghat from the main road

Saharghat is a semi urban panchayat in Madhwapur block of Madhubani district in Mithila region of Bihar, India. It is connected by National Highway 104 and State Highway 75 with different parts of the major cities in the state of Bihar, India and Madhesh Pradesh province of Nepal. The village comes under Harlakhi Assembly constituency and Madhubani Lok Sabha constituency.

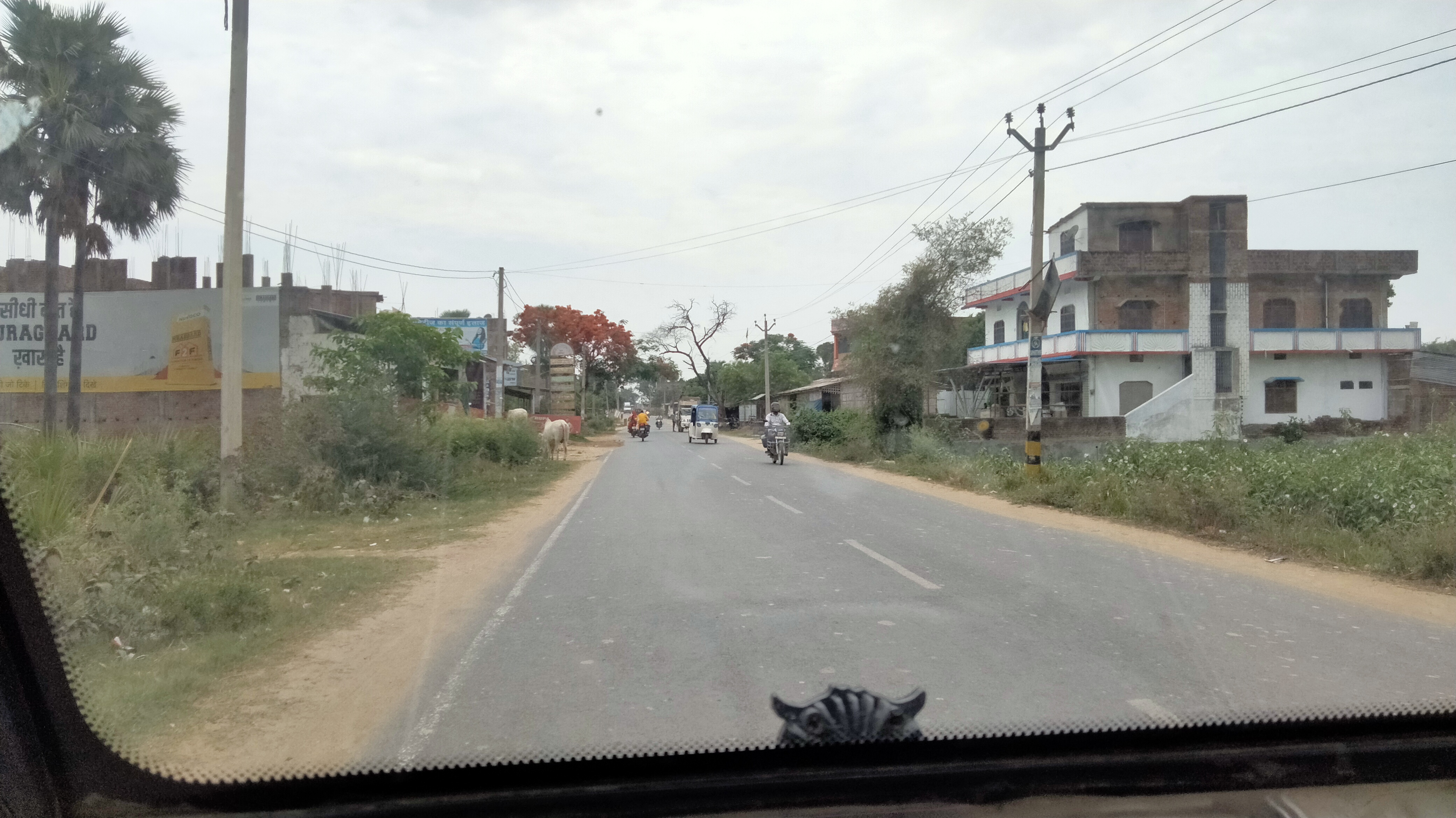
Skylines of Saharghat towards Basbaria Chowk

== Demographics ==
In the population census 2011, the name of the village is recorded as Sahar. According to the population census 2011, the total population of the village is 14368. Out of the total population, 7463 are males and 6905 are females. The total number of households in the village is 2833.

== Geography ==
Saharghat is around 40 km from the district headquarters town. It is approximately 10 km from the headquarters of Madhwapur block. It is located near the Indo Nepal border sub custum office Pipraun. The nearby villages are Baswariya, Utara, Bangara, Pakdasham, Vishanpur, Trimuhan, Loma, Pahipura, Salempur, Charaut and Basuki Bihari.

== Description ==
The market areas of the village is situated near the bank of Dhaunsh river flowing through the village. The law and order of the village is maintained by Saharghat Police Station. The important landmarks of the village are Netaji Subhash Chowk, Saharghat Bridge, Ramjanaki Chowk and Basbariya Chowk, etc. On the outskirts of the Basbariya Chowk, there is a very old temple of Lord Shiva known Basbaria Mahadev Mandir near the village.

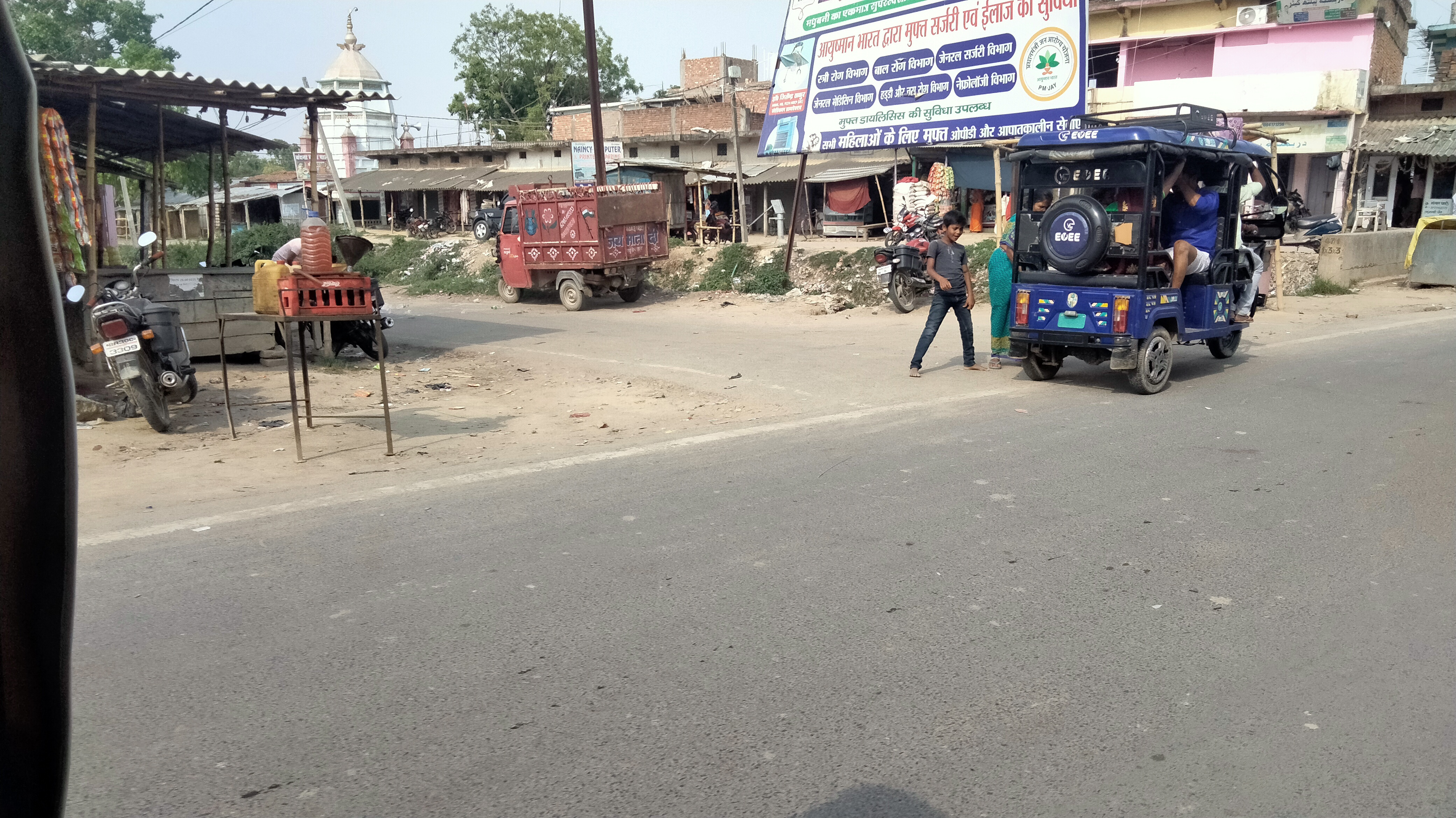
View of Ram Janaki Mandir at Ram Janaki Chowk in Saharghat

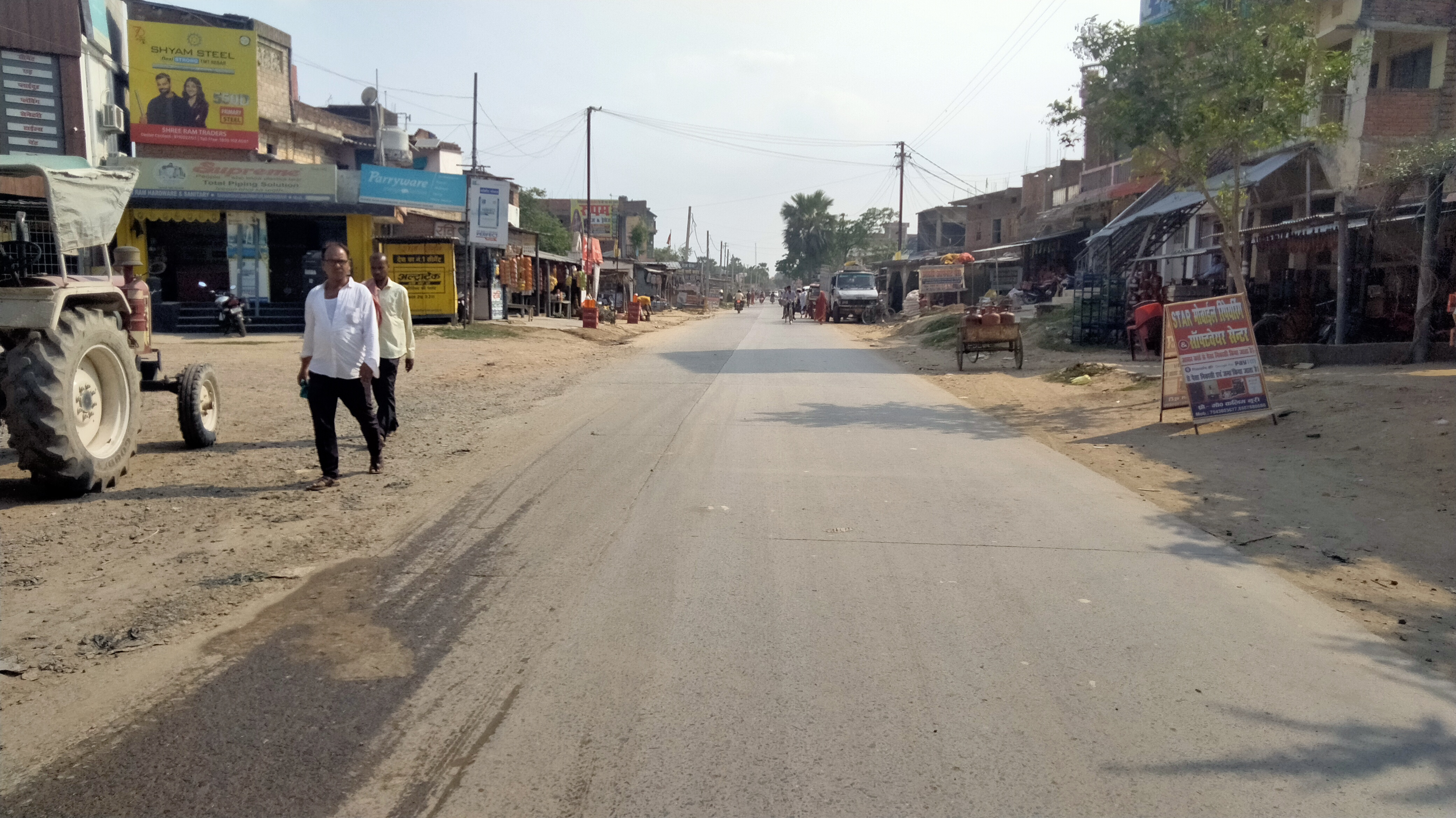
Saharghat Bazar, State Highway 75

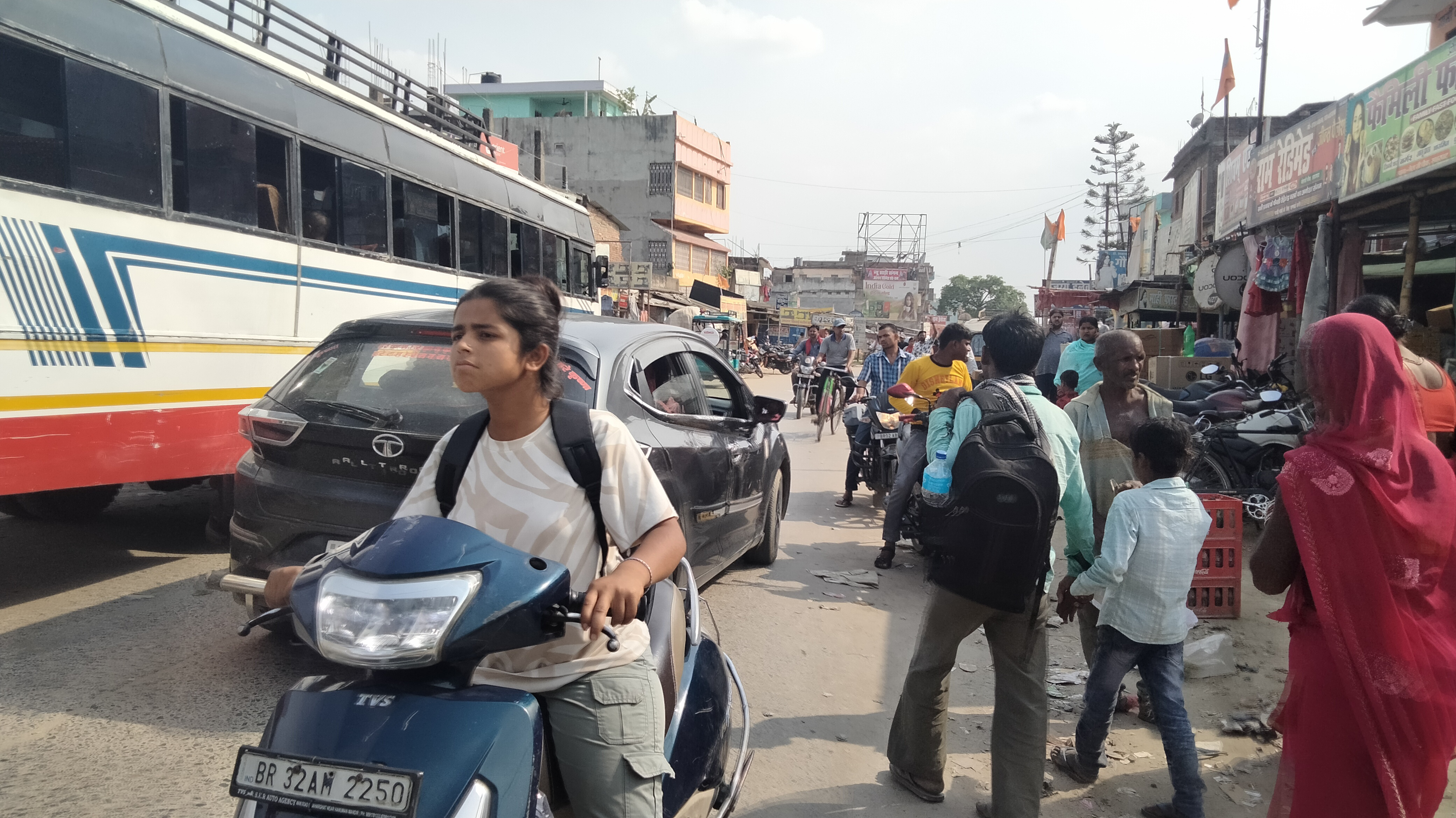
Netaji Subhash Chandra Chowk, Saharghat

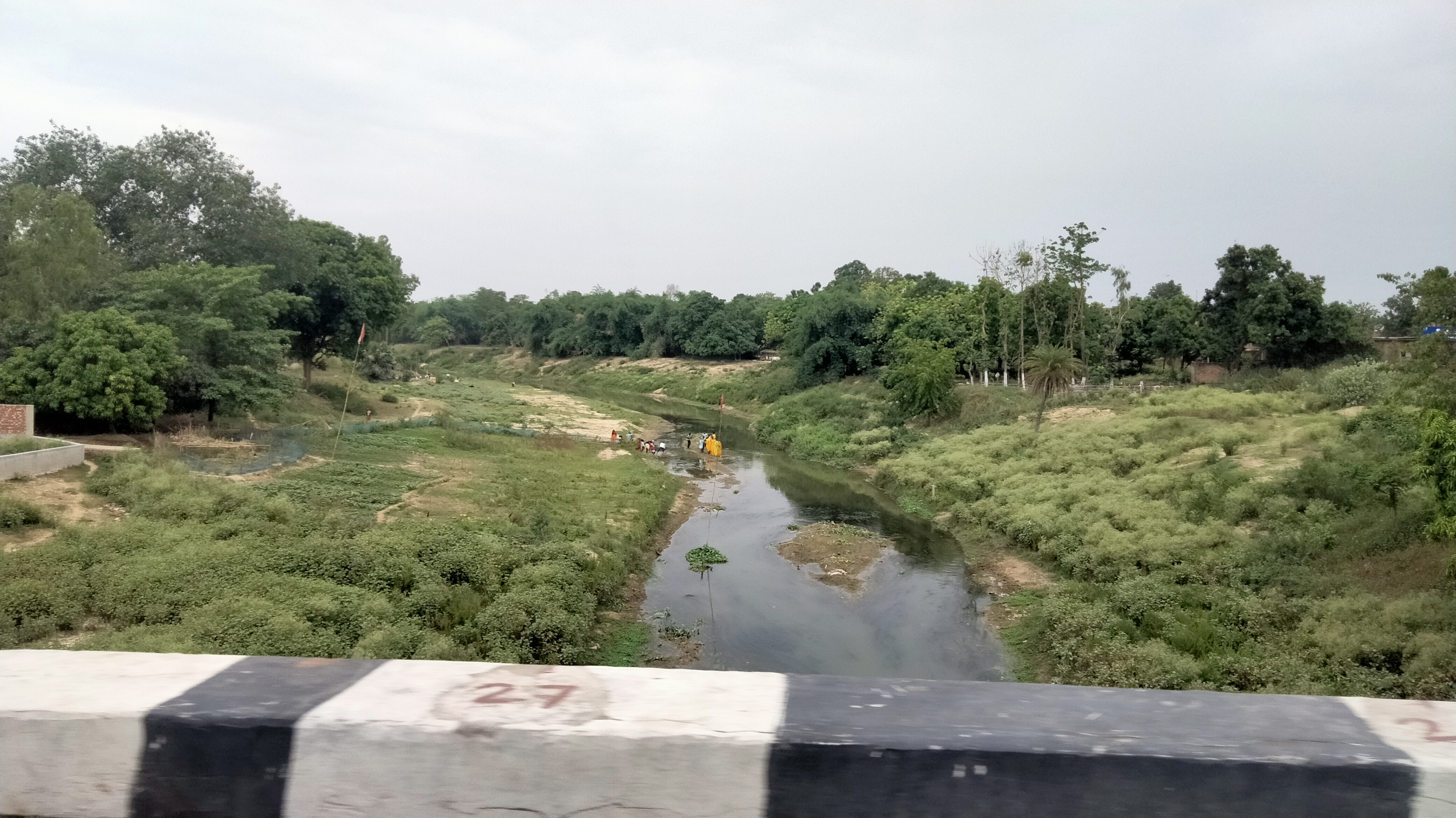
View of the Dhouns River from the Saharghat Bridge

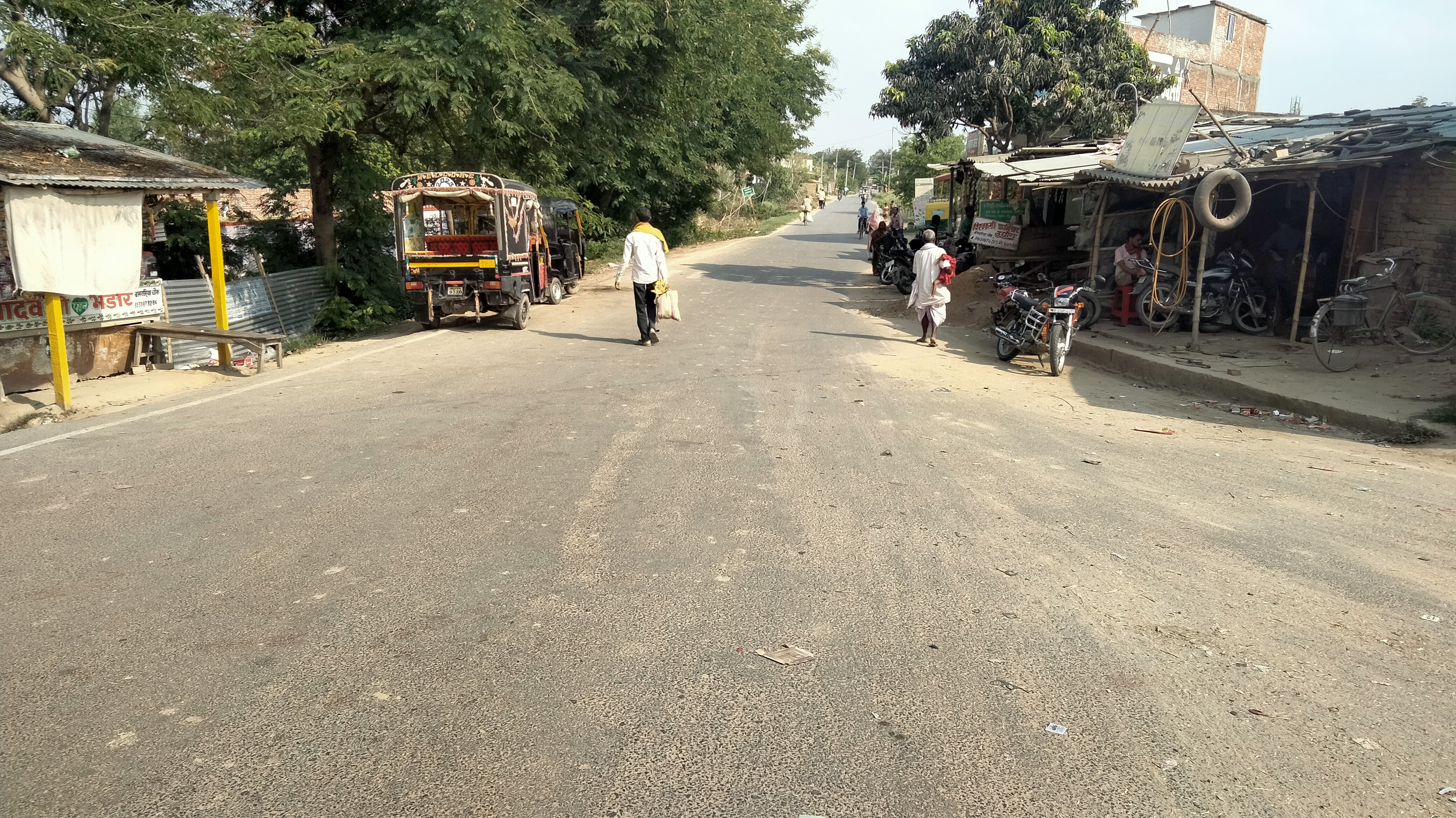
Basbaria Chowk at the outskirts of Saharghat.

== Saharghat Garh ==
The Saharghat Garh is a historical location where the Brahmasthan of the village is situated. It is popular for organising cultural programs of the village. Every year the festival of Kali Puja is celebrated here with a great enthusiasm. A grand procession of Kalash Shobha Yatra is conducted every year on the beginning day of the festival by the unmarried girls of the village. The Kalash Shobha Yatra begins from the place of worship at the Garh and after visiting half a dozen villages, including Saharghat, the holy water of the Dhouns River in Saharghat is filled in the Kalashes and it again reaches the place of worship at the Garh.

The Kashi Prasad Jayaswal Research Institute in Patna has designated the Saharghat Garh as an archeological site in the Madhwapur block of the Madhubani district in Bihar. According to the exploration carried out by the research institute, the period of the archeological site Saharghat Garh is estimated to be of the early medieval period.
