= Belsand =

- Town
- Location in Bihar, India
- Coordinates: 26.45°N 85.4°E
- Country: India
- State: Bihar
- Region: Mithila
- District: Sitamarhi

Population (2001)
  - Total: 20,566

Belsand is a town in the state of Bihar, India. The regional language is the Bajjika dialect of the Maithili language.

== Geography ==
Belsand is located at 26.45°N 85.4°E.

== Demographics ==
As of 2001 India census, Belsand had a population of 20,566. Males constitute 53% of the population and females 47%. 19% of the population is under 6 years of age.
