= Kapileshwar Mahadev Mandir, Garhbaruari =

Lord Shiva temple in Mithila

Kapileshwar Mahadev Mandir
- कपिलेश्वर महादेव मंदिर

Religion
- Affiliation: Hinduism
- District: Supaul
- Deity: Lord Shiva

Location
- Location: Garhbaruari
- State: Bihar
- Country: India
- Interactive map of Kapileshwar Mahadev Mandir
- Coordinates: 26.038463°N 86.602308°E

Architecture
- Founder: Kapila
- Established: 1024 BC
- Legendary temple of Lord Shiva attributed to the sage Kapila

Kapileshwar Mahadev Mandir (Maithili: कपिलेश्वर महादेव मंदिर) at Garhbaruari in the Mithila region is a historical Hindu temple dedicated to Lord Shiva. The Shivalinga of the temple is known as Baba Kapileshwar. The temple is attributed to the Vedic sage Kapila in Hinduism. It is located on the bank of Haridra river between the villages of Jagatpur and Garhbaruari or Baruari in the Supaul district of Bihar in India. The temple is situated at a distance of 10 kilometres in south of the district headquarter. The place of the temple is known as Kapileshwar Sthan or Baba Kapileshwar Sthan also Baba Kapileshwar Nath Mahadev Sthan. According to legend, it is believed to be a taposthali (place of penance) of the sage Kapila in the ancient times. According to the book written by a scholar Pandit Krishnadev Jha of the village, the establishment period of the legendary temple is considered to be 1024 BC. The temple is also known for organising Kanwar Yatra in the region.
