= Madhveshwar Nath Mahadev Mandir, Darbhanga =

Lord Shiva temple in Mithila

Madhveshwar Nath Mahadev Mandir
- माधवेश्वर नाथ महादेव मंदिर
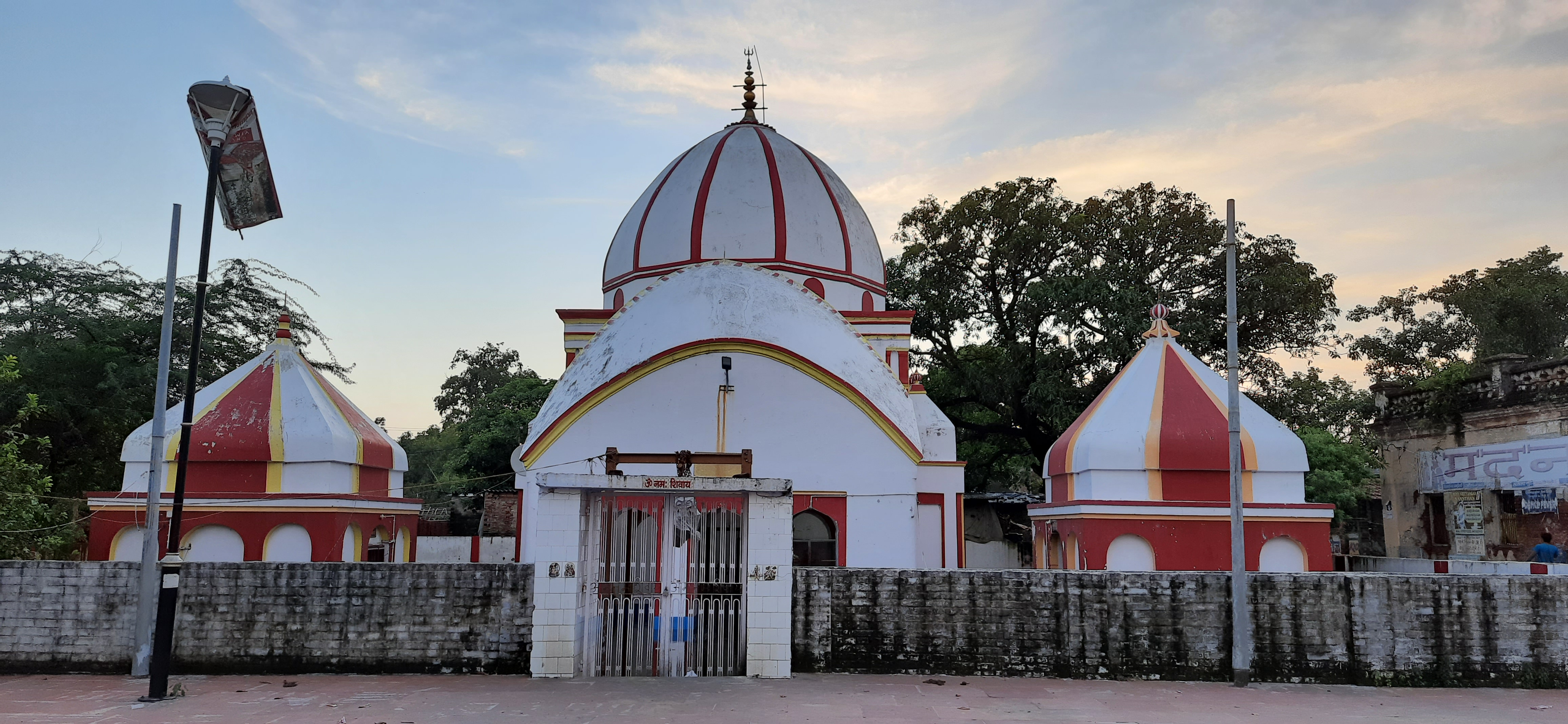
- View of the Madhveshwar Nath Mahadev Mandir in Darbhanga

Religion
- Affiliation: Hinduism
- District: Darbhanga
- Deity: Lord Shiva

Location
- Location: Madhveshwar Parisar, Mithila
- State: Bihar
- Country: India

Architecture
- Style: Tirhut style
- Founder: Maharaja Madhav Singh
- Established: 1762

Madhveshwar Nath Mahadev Mandir (Maithili: माधवेश्वर नाथ महादेव मंदिर) is a historical temple dedicated to Lord Shiva in the Mithila region of the Indian subcontinent. It is located in the city of Darbhanga in Bihar. It was named after the Maharaja Madhav Singh, a king of the Raj Darbhanga in Mithila. The premises of the temple is known as Madhveshwar Parisar or Madhveshwar Mandir. The temple was built in 1762 by the king. The premises of the Madhveshwar Mandir also holds several temples of other Hindu deities.
