= Jalabhisheka =

Hindu ritual

- जलाभिषेक
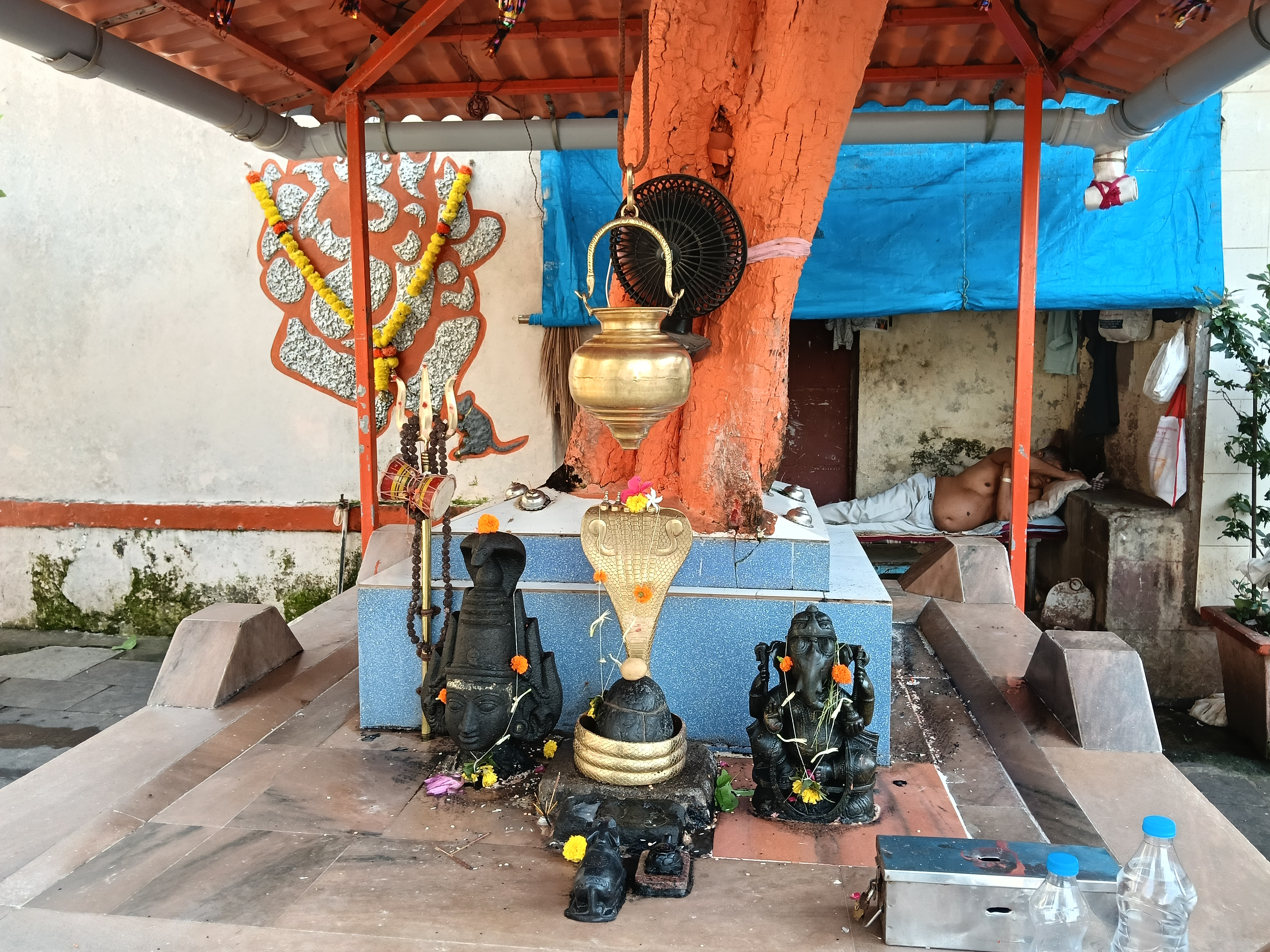
- A lingam jalabhisheka at Banganga (Walkeshwar) in Mumbai
- Classification: Hinduism
- Region: Indian subcontinent

Jalabhisheka (Sanskrit: जलाभिषेक, romanized: Jalābhiṣeka) also known as Jalabhishekam, is a ritual in Hinduism. In this practice, adherents pour a stream of holy water on a lingam, an anioconic form of the deity Shiva.

== Etymology ==
Jalabhisheka is a compound term derived from the Sanskrit words jala (water) and abhisheka (ritual pouring). It thus refers to the ceremonial act of pouring holy water over a murti (religious image) as an act of devotion and purification.

== Description ==
In Hinduism, the practice of the jalabhisheka worship to Shiva is popular across the Indian subcontinent. During the festivals of Sawan Sombari and Maha Shivaratri, the jalabhisheka on the lingams in Shiva temples is performed by a huge number of devotees of Shiva. Epigraphical evidence from the Talagunda pillar inscription (circa 450 CE) indicates that lingam worship, complete with ritual water offerings and the construction of temple tanks, was already established in Karnataka by the Kadamba dynasty by the mid-5th century CE. The Gudimallam Lingam, dated between the 3rd and 1st centuries BCE, represents one of the earliest unequivocal images of Shiva and suggests that ritual ablutions may have been performed on phallic cult-objects in antiquity.

== Ritual procedure ==
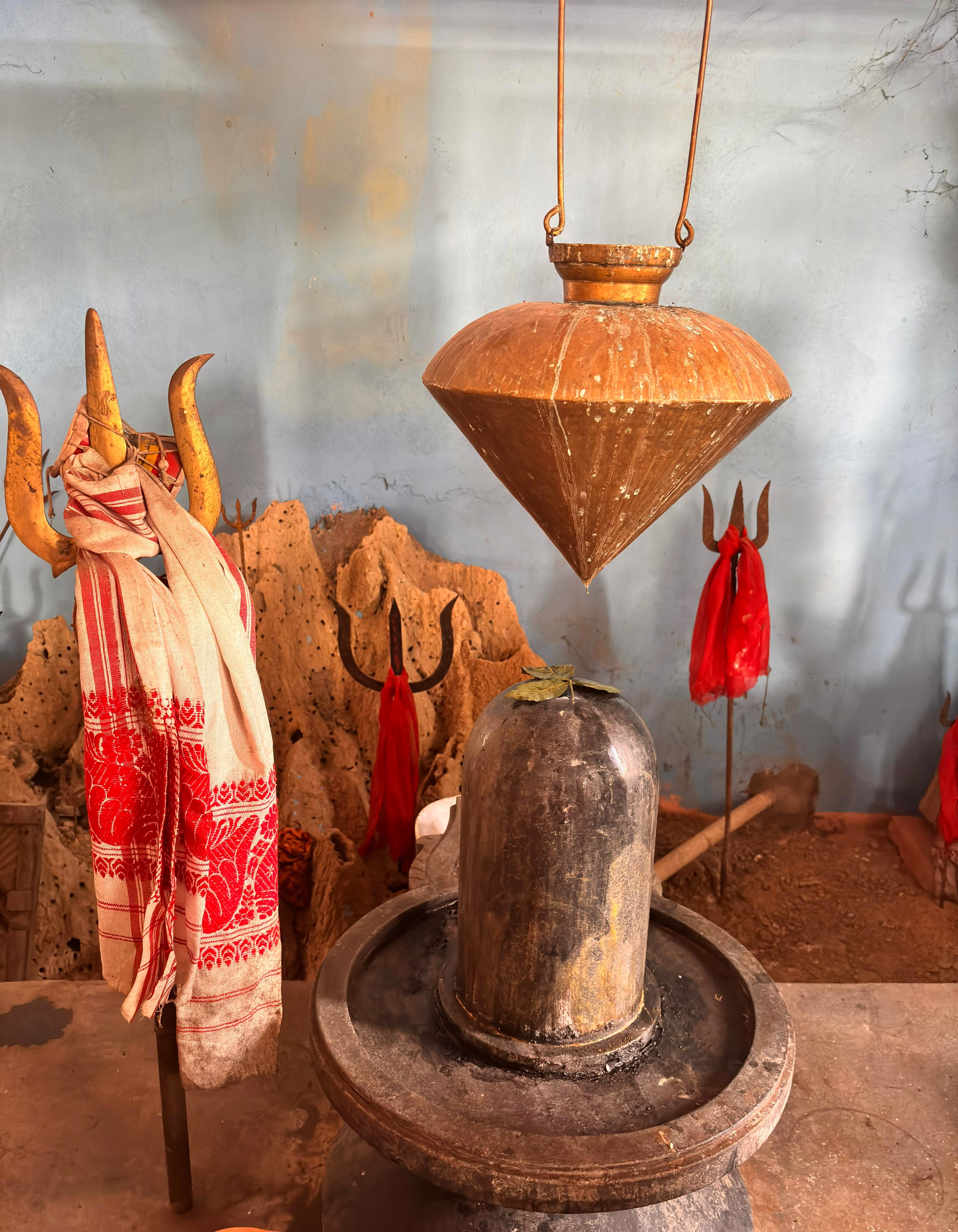
Jalabhisheka of a lingam

In the standard jalabhisheka ritual, a devotee first fills a kamandalu with consecrated water and approaches the lingam with reverence and respect. While standing or bowing before the lingam, the devotee pours the water in a slow, unbroken stream. This ensures it flows evenly over the stone surface. While the water cascades, prescribed mantras such as "Om Namah Shivaya," the Śatarudrīya hymn, or the Mahāmrtyuñjayamantra are intoned continuously, invoking Shiva's blessings and purificatory power.

After the completion of the water offering, many temples extend the rite by bathing the lingam in panchamrita. This is a mixture of milk, yogurt, ghee, honey, and sugar. This is followed by the presentation of bilva leaves and fresh flowers, and conclude the ceremony with an ārtī, offering to honor the deity's divine presence. Devotees often collect water from sacred rivers at astronomically auspicious moments, such as Pradosha evenings or during the Purnima lunar phase, to perform jalabhisheka, believing the timing further amplifies the rite's purificatory power.

== Symbolic significance ==
In Hindu belief, the act of jalabhisheka is not just a ritual but a symbolic gesture of spiritual cleansing. It reflects the devotee's intention to purify the mind and soul, to let go of ego and attachments, and to attain a sense of unity with the divine. The flowing of water over the lingam also signifies the eternal nature of time and consciousness, core principles in Shaivism. Scholars highlight that the water used in abhisheka functions as a purifying and sanctifying agent, similar to the water used in Vedic coronation and consecration rituals, representing spiritual transformation and divine blessing. The ritual also facilitates a transition from the mundane to the sacred, which is a common purpose of purification rites in many religious traditions.

== Regional variations ==
In different parts of the world, Shiva worship through water offerings takes on unique local flavors. In northern India, at shrines like Somnath, Kedarnath and Varanasi, devotees pour Ganges water (sometimes mixed with saffron) over the lingam during Shravana and Maha Shivaratri, celebrating the river's purifying power. Down south, temples such as Chidambaram and Madurai follow a six-times-daily ritual schedule, using not only water but also substances like sandal paste, pomegranate juice and turmeric in precise sequence. In eastern India, at Bhubaneswar's Lingaraja Temple, the sacred Bindusagar tank supplies water for communal ablutions, tying the lingam's care directly to the holy lake.

Out west, Ujjain's Mahakaleshwar Temple begins each day before dawn with the famous Bhasma Aarti, pouring water and then sacred ash over the lingam to symbolize life's cycles and the shedding of ego. Across the Himalayas in Nepal, priests at Pashupatinath draw water from the Bagmati River (often blending it with milk, ghee, honey and curd) for dawn abhisheka, linking Shaiva rites to both Vedic and Tantric traditions. And in Bali, the Melukat ceremony at temples like Tirta Empul uses holy spring water under priestly guidance to cleanse body and spirit, showing how the simple act of pouring water becomes a deeply meaningful ritual across cultures.
