= Lokeshwar Nath Mahadev Mandir =

Lord Shiva temple in Mithila

Coordinates: 26°30′49″N 85°47′48″E

- लोकेश्वर नाथ महादेव

Religion
- Affiliation: Hinduism
- District: Sitamarhi
- Deity: Lord Shiva
- Festivals: Mahashivratri, Sawan Sombari, Ramcharitmanas Navah Mahayajna

Location
- Location: Amanpur village, Mithila region
- State: Bihar
- Country: India
- Interactive map of Lokeshwar Nath Mahadev Mandir

Architecture
- Official name: Pandit Dinesh Jha
- Type: Priest

Lokeshwar Nath Mahadev Mandir (Maithili: लोकेश्वर नाथ महादेव मंदिर) is a Hindu temple of Lord Shiva in the Mithila region. It is located at the Amanpur village in the Charaut block of the Sitamarhi district in the state of Bihar in India. It is popular for organising ten-day long Ramcharit Manas Navah Mahayajna in the region. The present priest of the temple is Pandit Dinesh Jha. The temple is also known as Lokesh Nath Shiva Mandir or simply Lokesh Nath Mandir. The festivals of Mahashivratri and Sawan Sombari are the major festivals celebrated in the temple with a great pomp. The devotees come here to perform the sacred ritual Jalabhisheka on the Shivalinga of the temple. It is at a distance of 3.5 kilometres by road from the other near popular Shiva temple known Bhola Baba Pahadi Mandir.
