= Amanpur (Charaut) =

Village of Mithila

Amanpur अमनपुर
- Village
- Interactive map of Amanpur
- Country: India
- Region: Mithila region
- State: Bihar
- Division: Tirhut
- District: Sitamarhi
- Subdivision: Pupri
- Block: Charaut

Government
  - Type: Grampanchayat
  - Body: Charaut Purvi Panchayat
- Demonym: Maithil

Language
  - Official: Hindi

Regional languages
  - Mother tongue: Ancient: Maithili; Sanskrit

Amanpur (Maithili: अमनपुर) is a village in the Mithila region of Bihar in India. It is located in the Charaut block of the Sitamarhi district in state of Bihar in India. The mother tongue of the village is Maithili language. The village holds a Shiva temple called Lokeshwar Nath Mahadev Mandir. The temple is aligned with the tradition of Shaivism in Mithila. In the village, there is a high school for education. The village is situated in the Charaut Purvi panchayat. The village also holds a historical Salhesh Mandir for the Dushadh community. The Amanpur village and the Charaut town are connected by a road.
