= Charaut Math =

Temple in Bihar, India

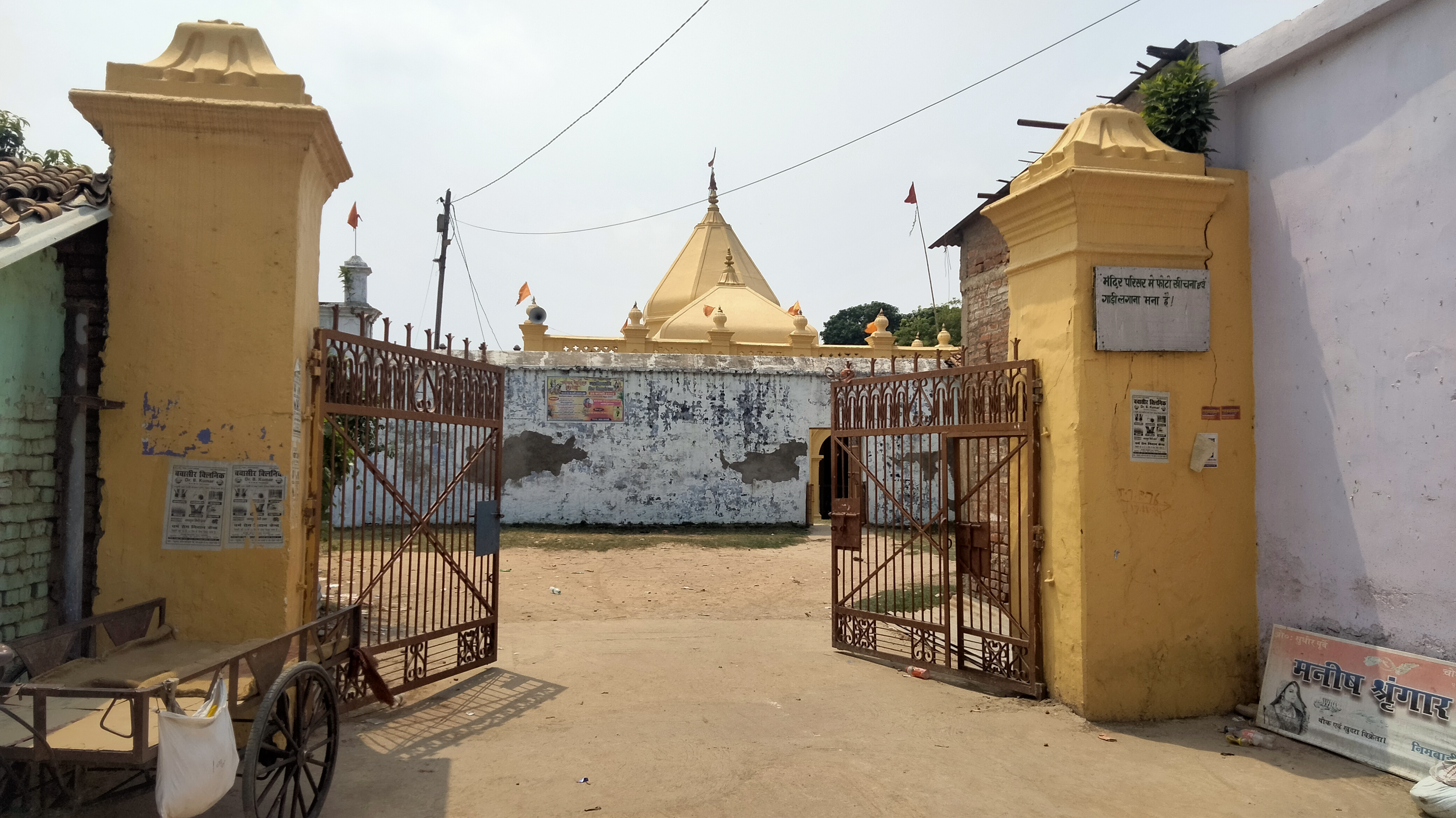
- Lakshminarayan Mandir

Religion
- Affiliation: Hinduism
- District: Sitamarhi
- Deity: Lakshminarayan (Vishnu)

Location
- Location: Charaut, Sitamarhi, Bihar
- State: Bihar
- Country: India
- Interactive map of Charaut Math
- Coordinates: 26.5310°N 85.7936°E

Architecture
- Founder: Mahant Jai Kishun and Maharaja of Darbhanga Raj
- Established: 1761

Charaut Math is a temple at Charaut block (Sitamarhi), in the Indian state of Bihar, of the Lakshminarayan monastic order group of the Hindu tradition. It is an ancient temple in the Mithila region of Bihar. Its antiquity is felt by looking at the throne with copper vessels, brass bells of over a Quital weight, brass and silver doors, etc. Apart from being a Hindu temple, it was also an important centre for the tradition of Sanskrit and Vedic learning in Mithila.

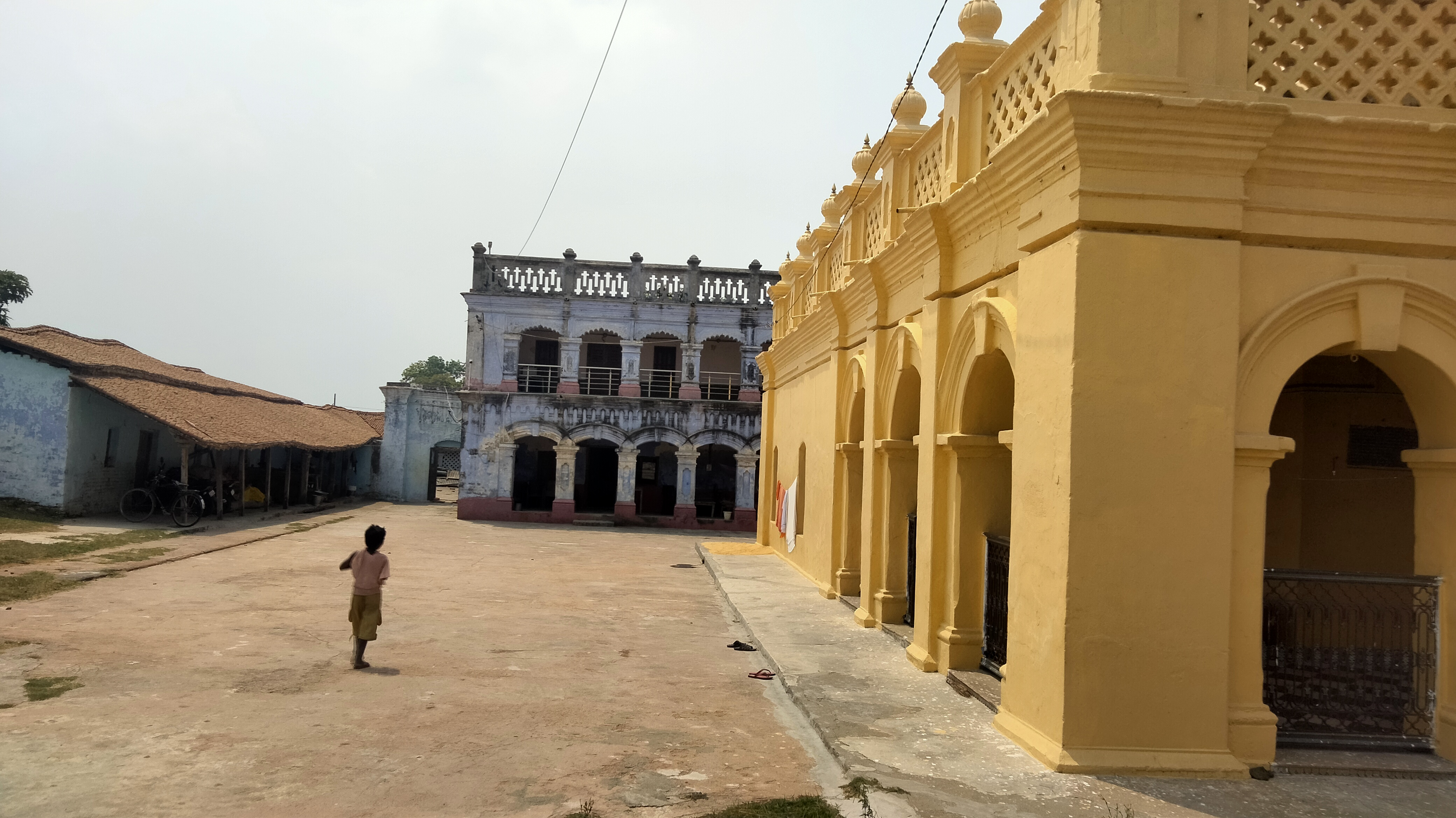
Campus of the Charaut Math

== History ==
Charaut Math is a Hindu monastery. It was founded by Mahant Jai Kishun. He was earlier a Mahanth (Head of Hindu Monastery) in a Hindu Math at Matihani Math (Yjnayavalkya Lakshminarayan Vidyapeeth) of Nepal territory. He founded this Hindu Math when the Maharaja of Darbhanga Raj granted this village for the purpose of building a monastery to impart Vedic knowledge to students. It was founded in 1761. It became an important center for the Hindu Vedic culture and tradition and education. Charaut was a part of the kingdom of Darbhanga Raj, in the 18th century.

The history of the math has also been described in the book "Antiquarian Remains In Bihar", written by D R Patil, Superintendent, Archeological Survey of India, South-Western Circle, Aurangabad, Maharashtra in 1963.

There is also another story about the math. It is said that 350 years ago it was a forest. A Mahatma named Tasmaiya Baba selected it as his penance and meditation place. Darbhanga Maharaja was influenced by his penance and meditation, so he donated thousands of acres of land as a gift to him.

== Present structure ==
The present structure of the Matha (new buildings) was constructed in the year 1915 during the period of the Mahant Ramlakhan Dasji. The present architecture of the temple is 111 years old.

The next Mahant Shyam Narayan Das initiated to take care the legacy of his Guru Ramlakhan Dasji properly. He constructed two high schools in the memory of the name of his guru, namely Lakhan Narayan Memorial High School and Laxmi Narayan Sanskrit High School in the year 1962.

== Within the Math ==
There is Lakshminarayan Mandir in the campus of the math. There is also a Sanskrit school in the Math which was established in 1926 known as Sri Laksmi Narayan Sanskrit High School, Choraut.

== Mahants ==
The head of the matha is called as Mahant. The mahant of the matha is nominated according to the tradition of Guru-Shishya parampara in Hinduism. Till now there have been nine Mahants in the Matha.

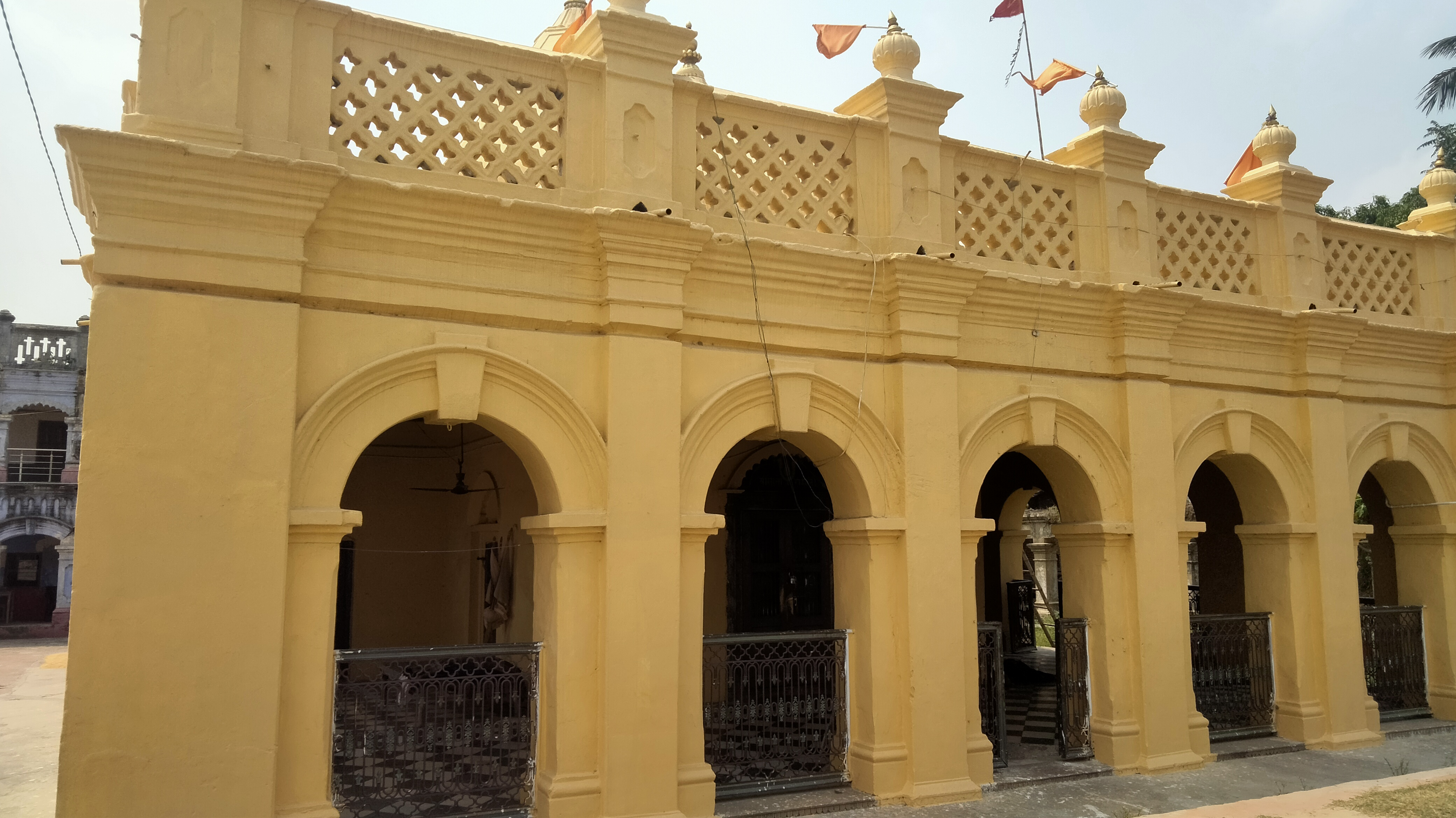
Closer view of the temple Lakshminarayan Mandir
