= Cheraut =

Town in Bihar, India

- Town
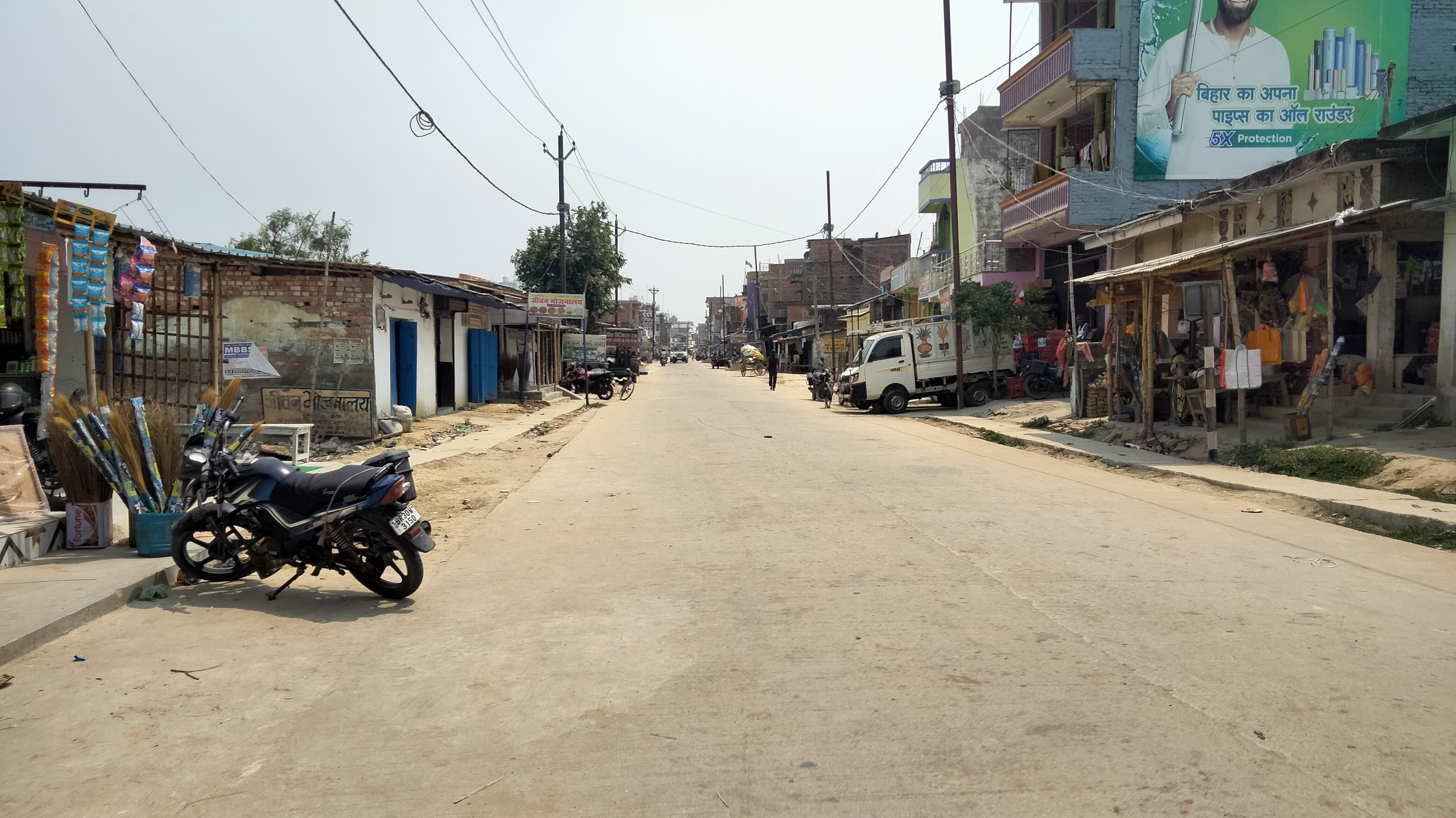
- View of the Charaut town

- Location within Bihar Location within India
- Coordinates: 26°32′02″N 85°47′38″E
- Country: India
- State: Bihar
- District: Sitamarhi
- Subdivision: Charaut

Government
  - Type: Sarpanch

Area
  - Total: 24.35 km^{2} (9.40 sq mi)
- Elevation: 63 m (207 ft)

Population (2011)
  - Total: 35,976
  - Density: 1,477/km^{2} (3,827/sq mi)

Languages
  - Common: Hindi, Maithili
- Time zone: UTC+5:30 (IST)
- PIN: 843819
- STD code: 06226
- Vehicle registration: BR-30

Cheraut, or Charaut, is a town and the administrative center of Choraut Block, Sitamarhi District, Bihar, India. It is near India's northern border with Nepal, approximately 30 kilometres east of the district capital Sitamarhi. With a population of 35,976 in 2011, it is the most populous settlement within Choraut Block.

== Geography ==
Cheraut is situated along the National Highway 527C. The town has a total area of 2435 hectares.

== Demographics ==
As of 2011, there were 8,342 households in Cheraut. 52.56% of the population were male and 47.44% of the population were female. The overall literacy rate was 46.30%, with 54.43% of the male residents and 37.29% of the female residents being literate.
