= Yjnayavalkya Lakshminarayan Vidyapeeth =

Sanskrit education institute in Nepal

Coordinates: 26°36′45.7272″N 85°50′37.08794″E

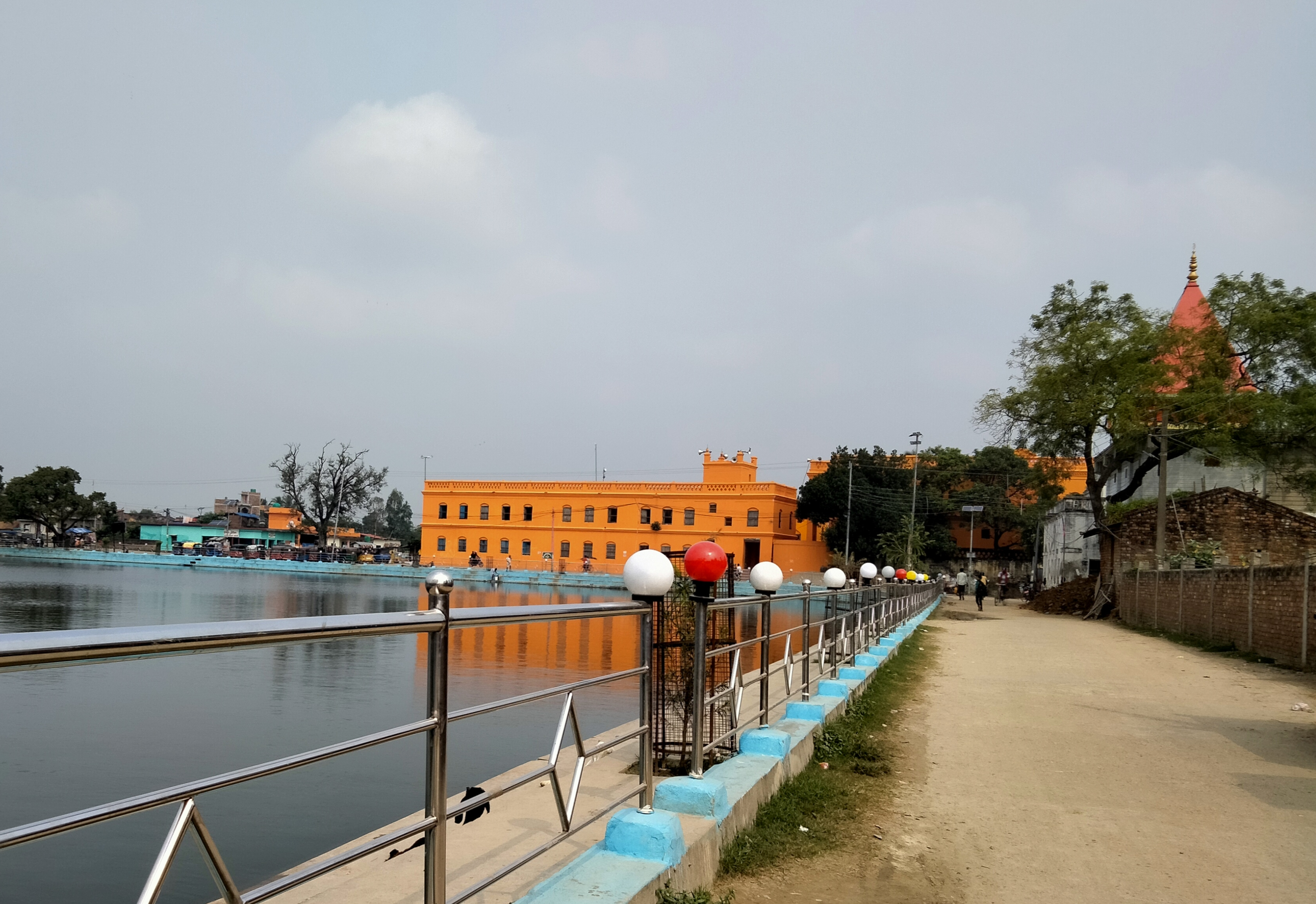
- Parent institution: Nepal Sanskrit University
- Founders: Tasmaiya Baba and King Hema Karna Sen
- Established: 1744 CE (1801 BS)
- Mission: Sanskrit Language and Hindu Vedic Education
- Location: Matihani, Mahottari, Madhesh, Nepal
- Interactive map of Yjnayavalkya Lakshminarayan Vidyapeeth
- Website: www.nsu.edu.np

Yjnayavalkya Lakshminarayan Vidyapeeth (Sanskrit: याज्ञवल्क्य लक्ष्मीनारायण विद्यापीठ) is a Sanskrit–language Nepalese university campus. It is the first school of Nepal and one of the constituent campuses of Nepal Sanskrit University. It was established in 1774 CE (1801 BS) by Hema Karna Sen, the King of Makwanpur and a sage named Tasmaiya Baba in Matihani village of Nepal. It is one of the oldest educational institutions of Nepal and has helped establish Matihani, Mahottari as a centre of Sanskrit and Vedic education.

== Etymology ==
The campus is named after the Hindu sage Yajnavalkya and the divine couple Lakshmi Narayana. The campus was established on the premise of a temple dedicated to Lakshmi Narayana. Vidyapeeth loosely translates to an educational centre.

== History ==
In 1744 (1801 BS), King Hema Karna Sen of Makwanpur built a temple dedicated to Lakshmi Narayana at Matihani, and a sage named Tasmaiya Baba started teaching Sanskrit below a Peepal tree located at the temple's premises. From 1950 BS (1893–1894), the institution started teaching Sanskrit grammar, Vedanta, and Ramayana. From 1968 BS (1911–1912), the Mahanth (main priest) of Lakshminarayan Matha Varanasidas and Chhatranath, started teaching Vedas, Nyaya Shastra and Jyotish Shastra.

== Programs ==
- Uttar Madhyama (Intermediate)
- Shastri (Bachelor's)
- Prakshastri
