= Nageshwar Nath Mahadev Mandir =

Lord Shiva temple in Mithila

- नागेश्वर नाथ महादेव मंदिर
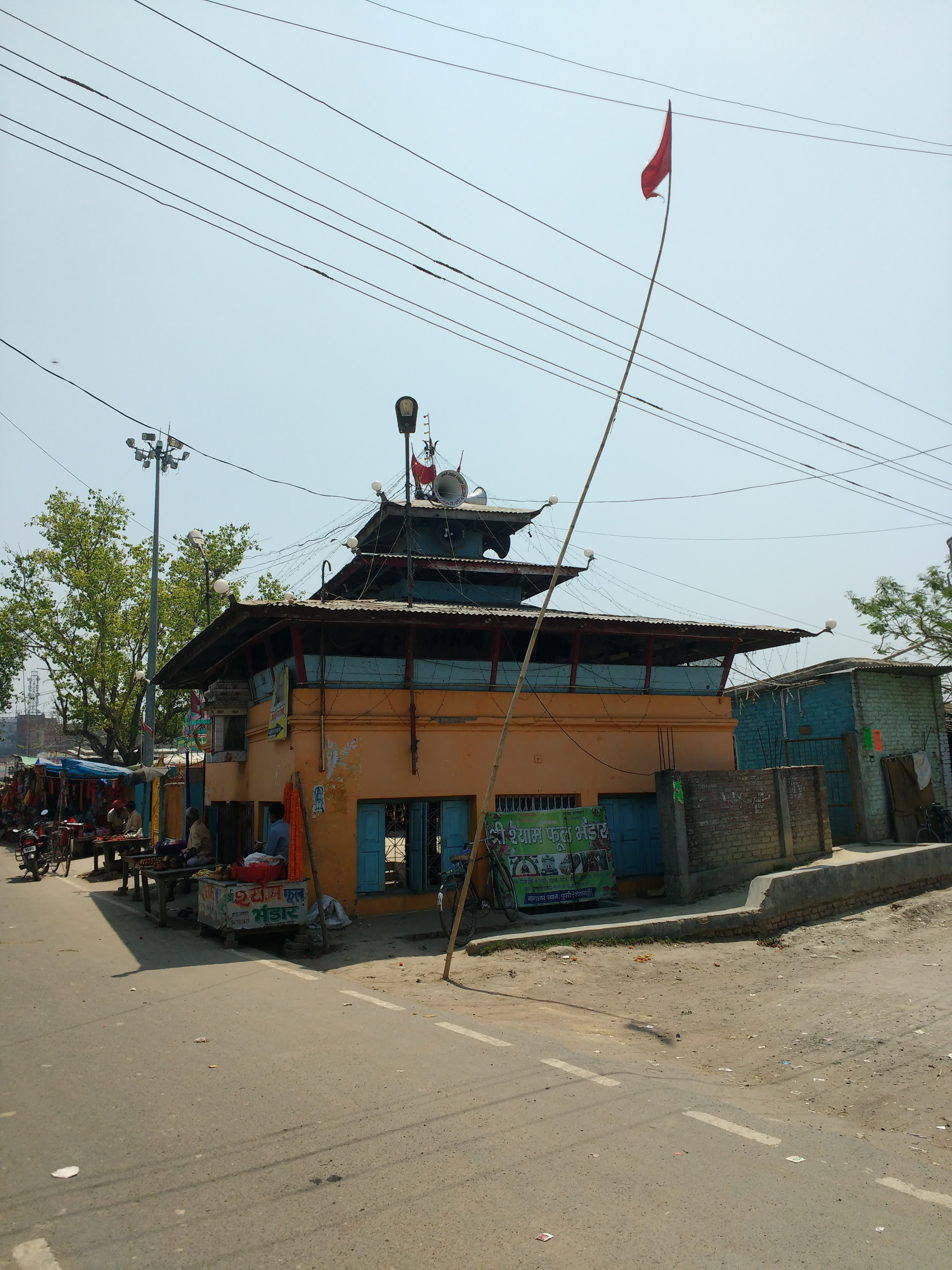
- Nageshwar Nath Mahadev Mandir at Pupri

Religion
- Affiliation: Hinduism
- District: Sitamarhi district
- Deity: Lord Shiva
- Festivals: Mahashivratri, Sawan Sombari
- Governing body: Bihar State Religious Trust

Location
- Location: Pupri town, Mithila region
- State: Bihar
- Country: India
- Interactive map of Nageshwar Nath Mahadev Mandir
- Coordinates: 26.4745283°N 85.7006007°E

Architecture
- Style: Nepalese Style
- Groundbreaking: 15 October 1968
- An ancient Shivalinga emerged from the ground at Pupri town in the Mithila region of Indian subcontinent

Nageshwar Nath Mahadev Mandir (Maithili: नागेश्वर नाथ महादेव मंदिर) is a temple of Lord Shiva at Pupri town of the Sitamarhi district in Mithila region of Bihar in India. The iconic Lingam of the temple is known as Swayambhu Shivalinga.

== Etymology ==
The temple name is derived from the Nageshwar form of Lord Shiva. The Shivalinga of the temple is locally known as Baba Nageshwar Nath Mahadev.

== Description ==
The Shivalinga of the Nageshwar Nath Mahadev Mandir was emerged from the earth around century ago. It is said that the Shivalinga was seen in a hole by some children playing kancha under a pipil tree there on 15 October 1968 at 4 pm. The name of the boy who first saw the Shivalinga was Shankara. He was of the age around 12 years at that time. After that people there took out the Shivalinga and started worshiping it. The Shivlinga of the temple is ancient. It is said that those days there was election in the country, so due to the popularity of the discussion of the sudden emergence of the Shivalinga, the former prime minister Indira Gandhi also visited the temple during her elections campaign in the region.

The temple was built in Nepalese architectural design. The temple was carved in the style of the famous Pashupatinath Mandir in Kathmandu.
