= Araila Chaur =

Geographical area shared by Madhubani and Sitamarhi districts

Araila Chaur ( Maithili: अरैला चौर ) is a geographical area between the villages of the Basuki Bihari South and Charaut, which gets filled with water during the monsoon. It is mainly used for agriculture and fish farming. The area is also used as grazing land. It is located in the Mithila region of the Indian subcontinent. It is a lone area having no human settlements. It is situated on both sides of the Charaut - Madhwapur main road. The road is part of National Highway 227 (formerly known as NH 104). The region of the Araila Chaur is divided into two districts of Bihar in India. The northern part of it lies in the Madhubani district and that of southern part lies in the Sitamarhi district.

The area of the chaur is used for farming, agricultural activities and grazing, etc. It is a popular area for fishing activities by the youths from the neighbouring villages. In the year 2025, a very unique turtle was observed at a pond in the area of Araila Chaur by some youths who came to fishing at the pond. Several written type shapes were seen on body of the turtle or tortoise. Due to the unique structure and written shapes on the body of the tortoise, a large crowd of people from far and wide started gathering to see it at the pond.
