= Tasmaiya Baba =

Revered Hindu saints in Mithila

- तसमैया बाबा
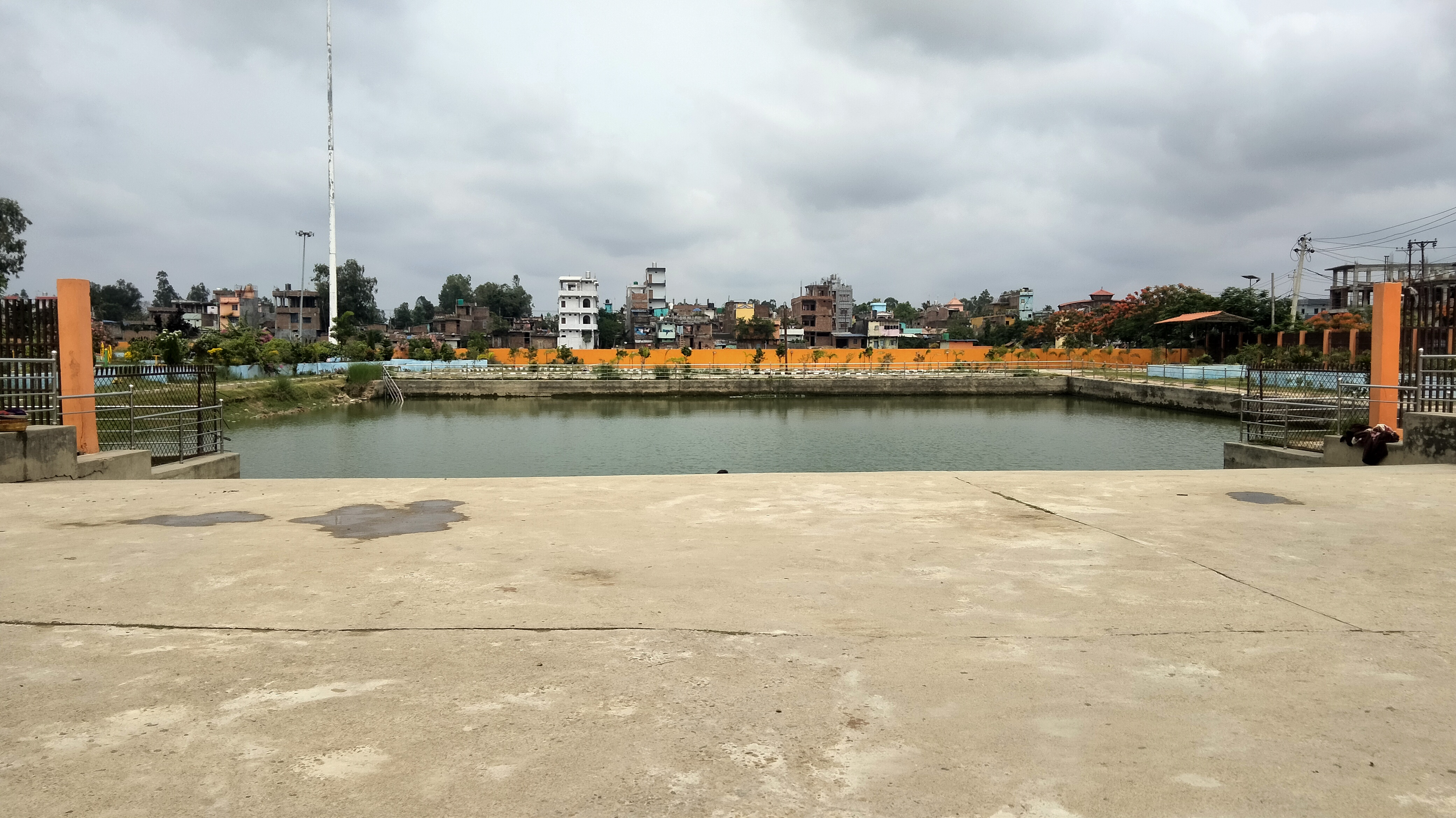
- View of the Tasmaiya Baba Park developed around the Samadhi Sthal of Tasmaiya Baba at Matihani Matha in Nepal.
- Born: Ramdas; Charaut
- Died: Lakshminarayan Matha, Matihani
- Monuments: Tasmaiya Baba Samadhi Sthal Park, Matihani; Tasmaiya Baba's Khanti (Digging metal rod)
- Other name: Ramdas Tasmaiya Baba
- Occupation: Mahatma
- Era: 17th - 18th century CE
- Known for: Foundation of Charaut Matha and Lakshminarayan Matha
- Notable work: Propagation of Sanskrit and Vedic learning in Mithila

Notes
- A revered Mahatma in Mithila

Tasmaiya Baba (Maithili: तसमैया बाबा) was a prominent Mahatma in the Mithila region of the Indian subcontinent. He was known for his spiritual devotion towards God. His history is linked to the foundation of Charaut Matha and Lakshminarayan Matha in the region. He lived during the period of 17th century CE in Mithila. He was patronised by the Maharaja of Raj Darbhanga as well as by the king of Makwanpur in the region.

== Etymology ==
The real name of Tasmaiya Baba was Ramdas. It is said that, he often used to eat Tasmai as his diet. The term tasmai is used for delicious kheer. It is a delicious food prepared using rice, creamy milk, and sugar, etc. The term Baba is a honorific word generally used for an ascetics holy religious person or sanyasi in Indian subcontinent. Since he often used to eat Tasmai as his favourite food, so he was called as Tasmaiya Baba.

== Description ==
His full name was Ramdas Tasmaiya Baba. He was living at Charaut village in the Mithila region. The village is presently in the Sitamarhi district of Bihar in India. In the village, there was his Sadhana Sthali (meditation place), where he used to perform meditation towards God regularly. It is said that the Maharaja of Raj Darbhanga was very influenced by his devotion towards God. He patronised him and gifted thousands acres of land in the village to him in donation. The land was donated to him for establishing Sanskrit and Vedic learning centre in the village. After that Tasmaiya Baba established his matha in the village for the propagation of Sanskrit and Vedic learning in the region. A temple dedicated to Lord Lakshminarayan was also built there.

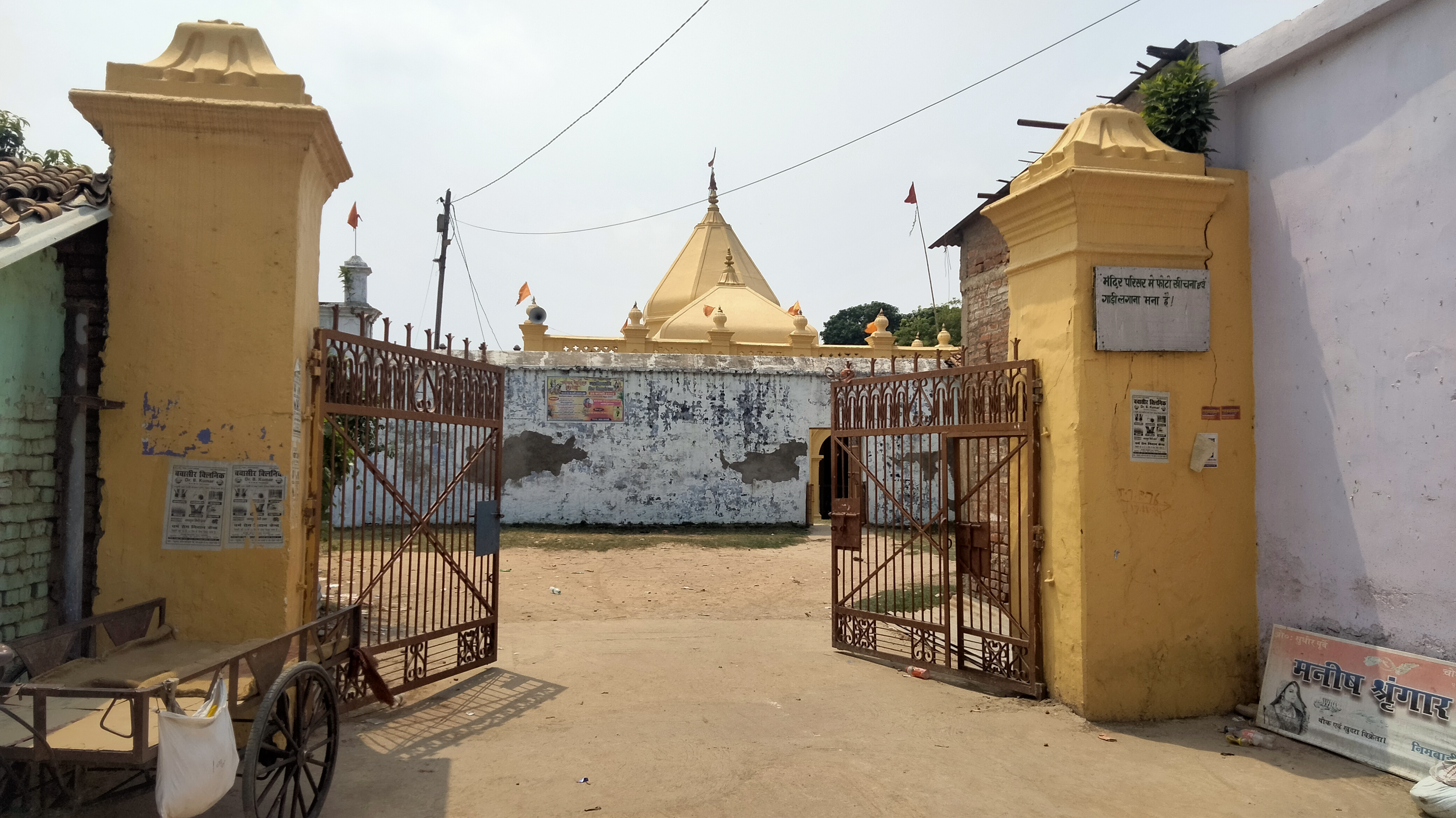
The Sadhana Sthali of Tasmaiya Baba at Charaut in India, The view of Lakshmi Narayan Mandir at Charaut Matha.

Later he lived at Matihani village in the region. The village is presently in the Mahottari district of Madhesh Pradesh in Nepal. There he established his meditation place on the bank of the sacred pond Lakshmi Sagar in the village. In the village, there is legend that once a king of Sena Dynasty from Makwanpur came to the saint Tasmaiya Baba. The king was childless, so he wished to have a child in blessing from the saint. The saint advised the king to build a temple of Lakshminarayan there. The king agreed with the saint and built a temple dedicated to Lord Lakshminarayan on the bank of the sacred pond. It is said that the king became father of a child later. After that the king again came to the saint. In this visit of the king, the saint advised to build a pathshala for providing education to children in the village. The king established a school there for propagation of Sanskrit and Vedic education in the region.
