= Choraut =

Choraut चोरौत Chaurhut
- Block
- Charaut
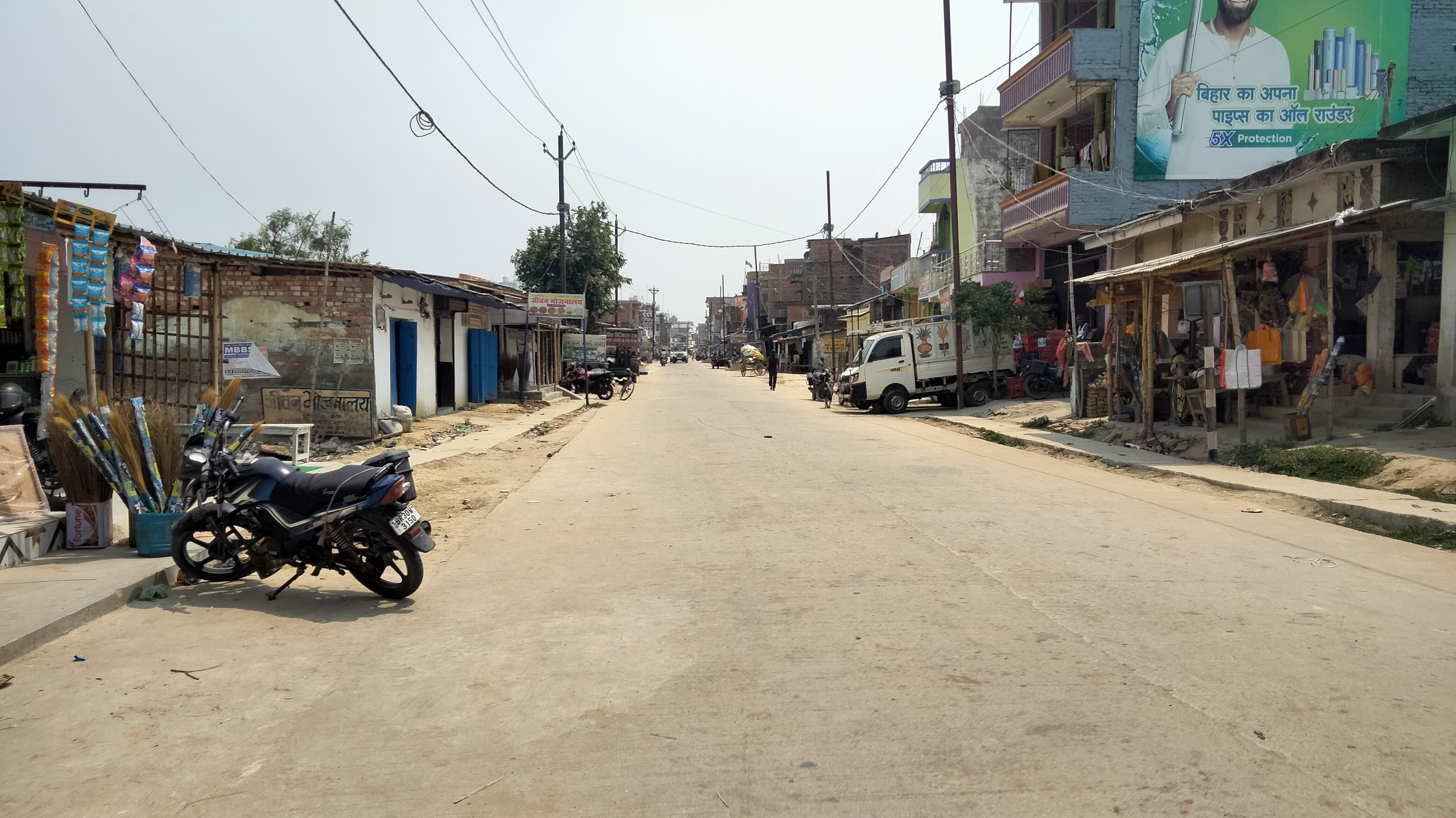
- View of the Chaurat town, the headquarter of the block area
- Interactive map of Choraut
- Country: India
- State: Bihar
- Region: Mithila
- Division: Tirhut
- District: Sitamarhi
- Sub-divisional headquarter: Pupri
- Block: Charaut
- Founder: King Chor Chakbe
- Named for: Chaur and Hut - The name of patra (vessels) used in Yajna
- Demonym: Maithil

Languages
  - Official: Mother tongue; Ancient: Hindi: Maithili; Sanskrit

Choraut (Maithili: चोरौत) is a block in the Sitamarhi district of the Mithila region in the state of Bihar in India. Its administrative center is Cheraut. It is the part of Tirhut division. The sub-divisional headquarter of the Charaut block is Pupri town.

Choraut is connected with the national highway from Delhi. This block is near the Nepal border. Janakpur road crosses to Janakpur Dham. Choraut makes up the northern part of Choraut Block. Seven panchayats comprise Choraut: Choraut Uttari, Choraut Paschimi, Choraut Purvi, Bhantabari, Barri-behta, Parigama, and Yadupatti.

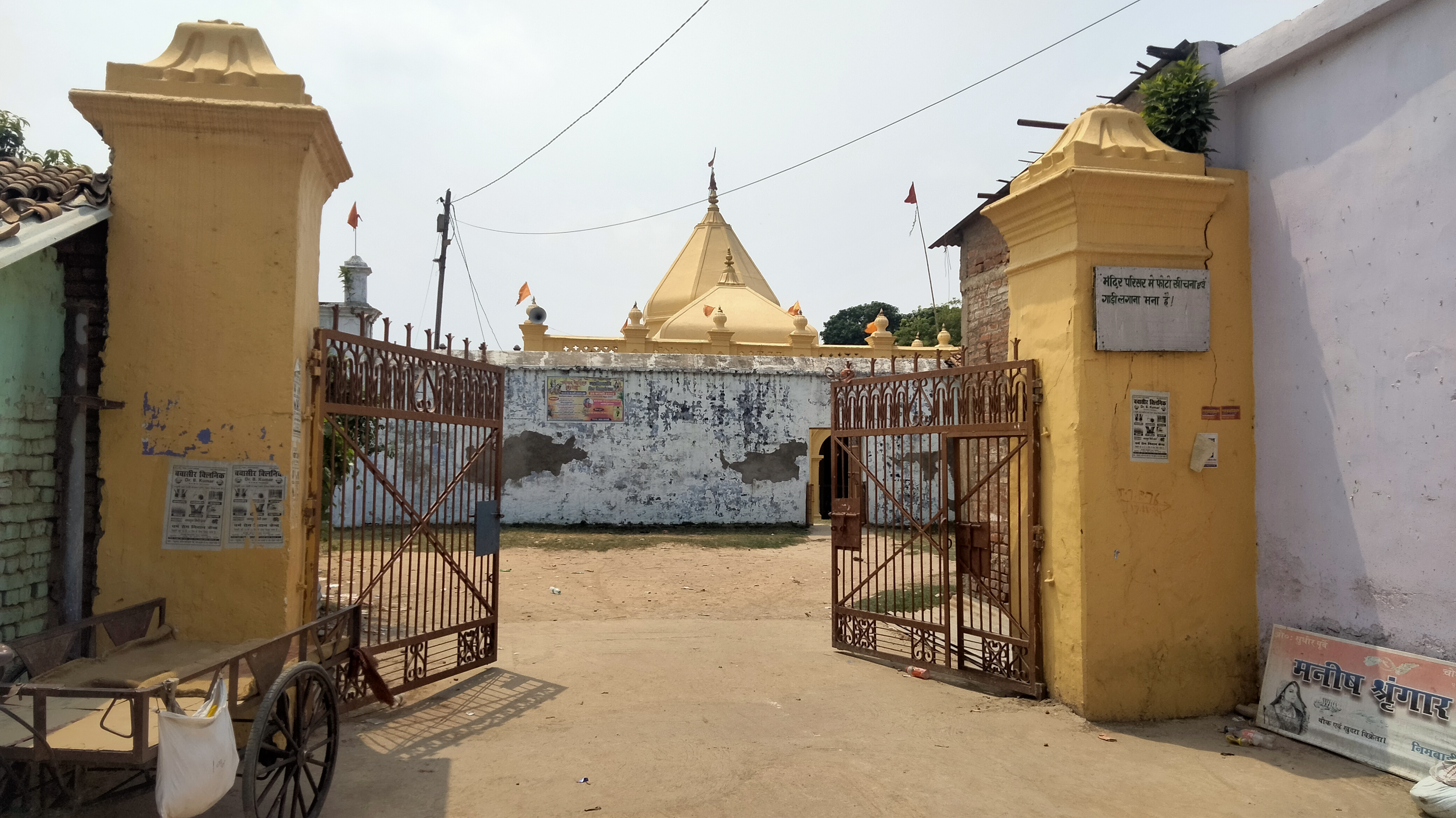
View of Lakshminarayan Mandir at Charaut Matha

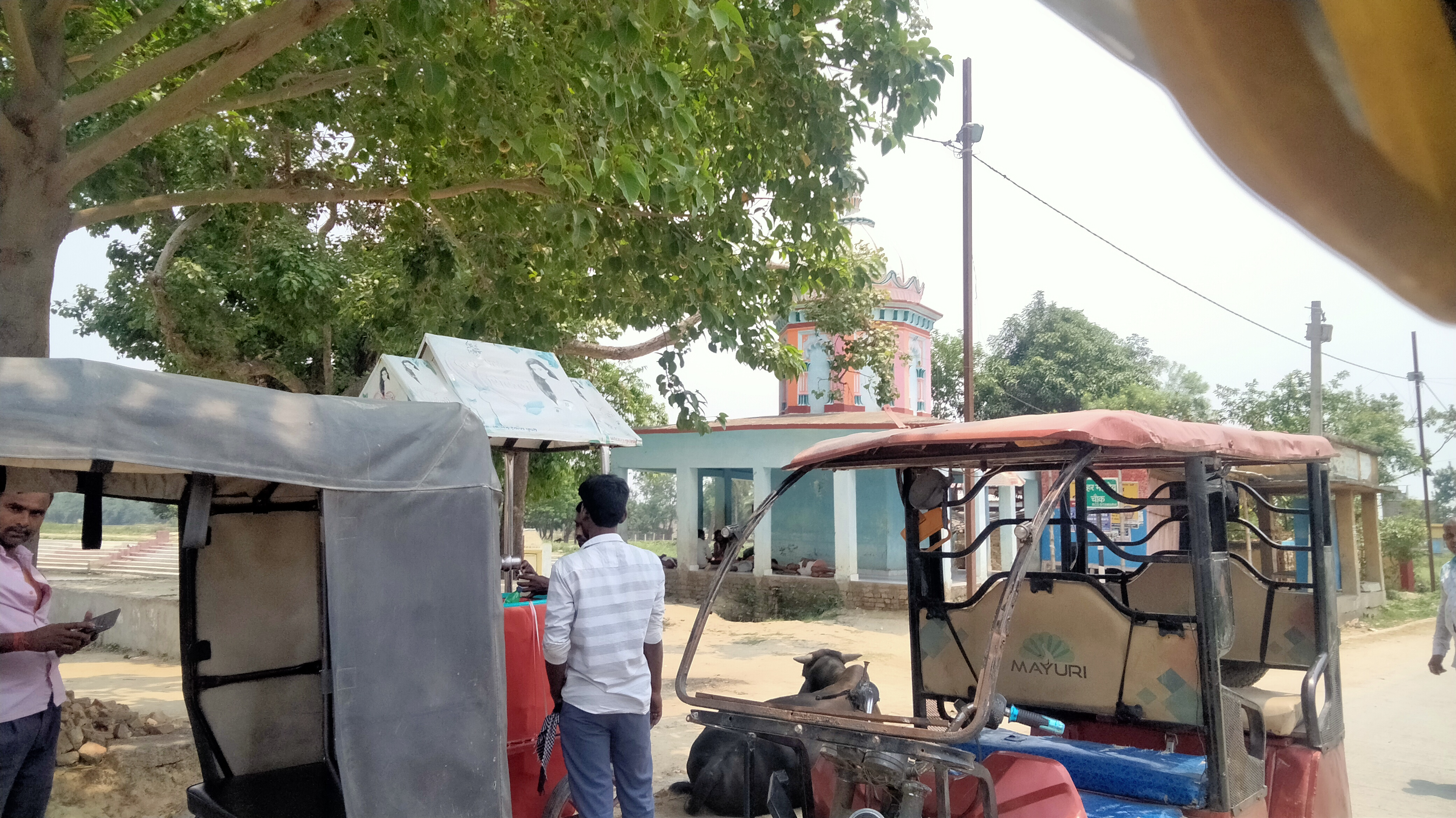
Pahadi Mandir Chowk in the Charaut town

== History ==
According to the history of Mithila, the region of Charaut block was ruled by a king named Chor Chakbe. It is said that a stream of the Kamala River was flowing through the middle of the village. At a short distance from the bank of the river, there was a dih. The dih was known for the Yajnasthali of the King Chor Chakbe, where he used to worship and perform Yajna regularly.

In the later period around 300 years ago, it was also the Sadhana Sthali of the saint named Tasmaiya Baba. He used to conduct his spiritual practices here. The Maharaja of Raj Darbhanga was very impressed by his austerity and devotion. Therefore, the Maharaja of Darbhanga donated thousands of acres of land to the saint Tasmaiya Baba. Then a matha was established in the village dedicated to Sanskrit and Vedic learning in Mithila, which is known as Charaut Matha.

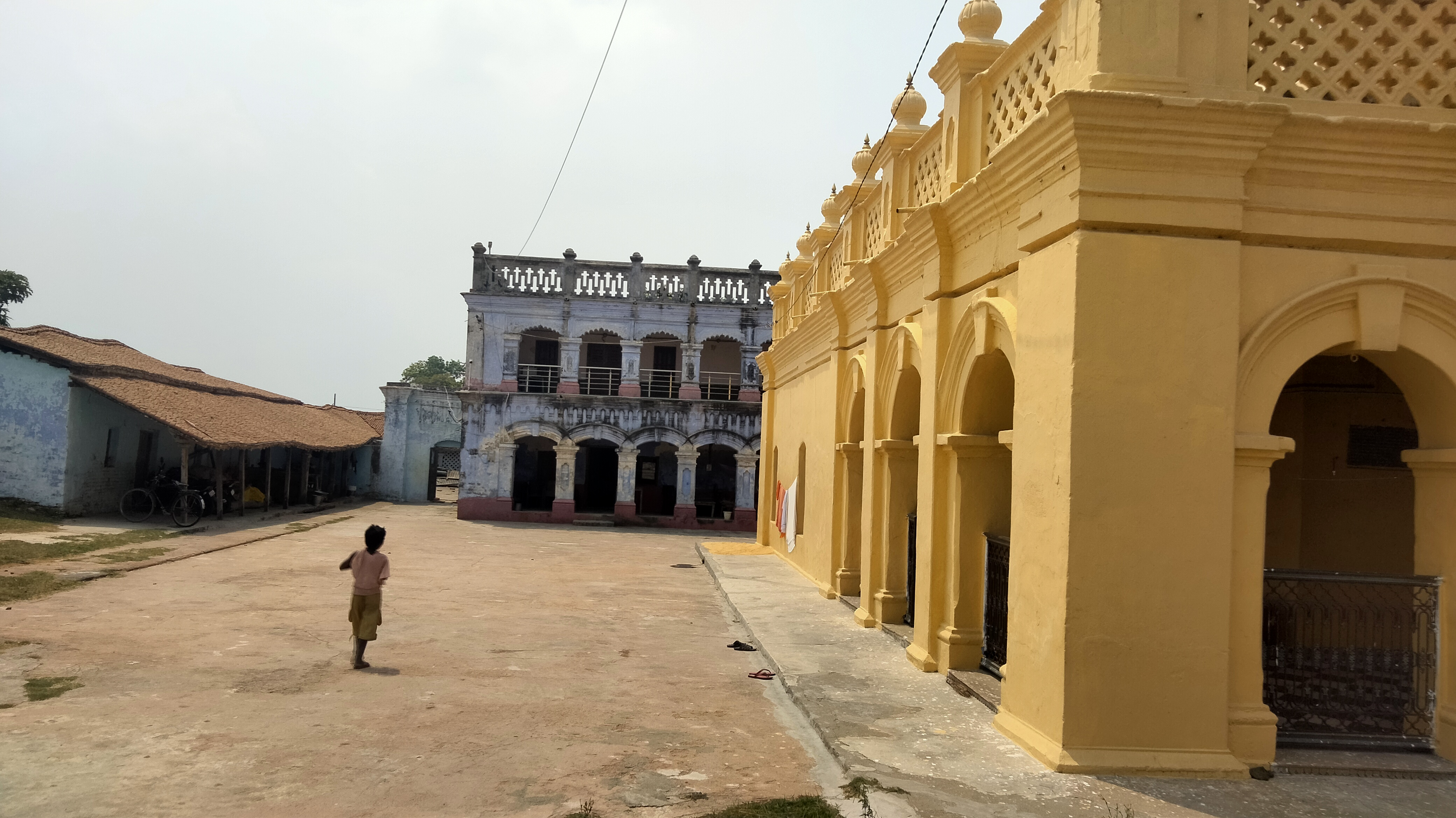
Campus of the Charaut Matha

== Etymology ==
According to the older people of the village, the patra (vessels) used in Yajna were called chaur and hut. From these two words, the village was called Chaurhut since that time. After that the term Chaurhut gradually corrupted and presently its apbhransh name became Choraut or Charaut from the term Chaurhut.

== Important landmarks ==
In the Mithila region, the town of Charaut is famous for organizing a large bull marketing fair. It is known as Charaut Bail Mela. There is a very large ground known as Rambagh, where the Mela is organised twice in a year. The total area of the fair ground is 52 bighas. The first season of the Mela is organised in the month of Vaisakh and called as Baisakhi Bail Mela. The second season of the Mela is organised in the month of Magh and called as Maghi Bail Mela. It is held since several decades. Nowadays, the decades old fair of bulls is on the verge of extinction.

== Geography ==
Rato and Yamuni rivers flow in the west part of Choraut. The rivers flood each year. Choraut lies on the path of Janakpur Road. In the north side of the town, there are Araila Chaur and Basuki Bihari village of the Madhwapur block. Similarly in the east side, Saharghat is an important trade centre. In Yadupatti one village situated in the north corner named as Maneshwar nath mandir. Barma village which comes under choraut Pachimi is most developed in the block.

== Festival ==
Durga puja, Diwali, Chhat puja, Indra puja and Gau pooja, Dhash Poornima are the main festivals of Choraut village. Hindus and Muslims all participate in these festivals.
