= Lakshminarayan Matha =

Hindu monastery in Nepal

- लक्ष्मीनारायण मठ
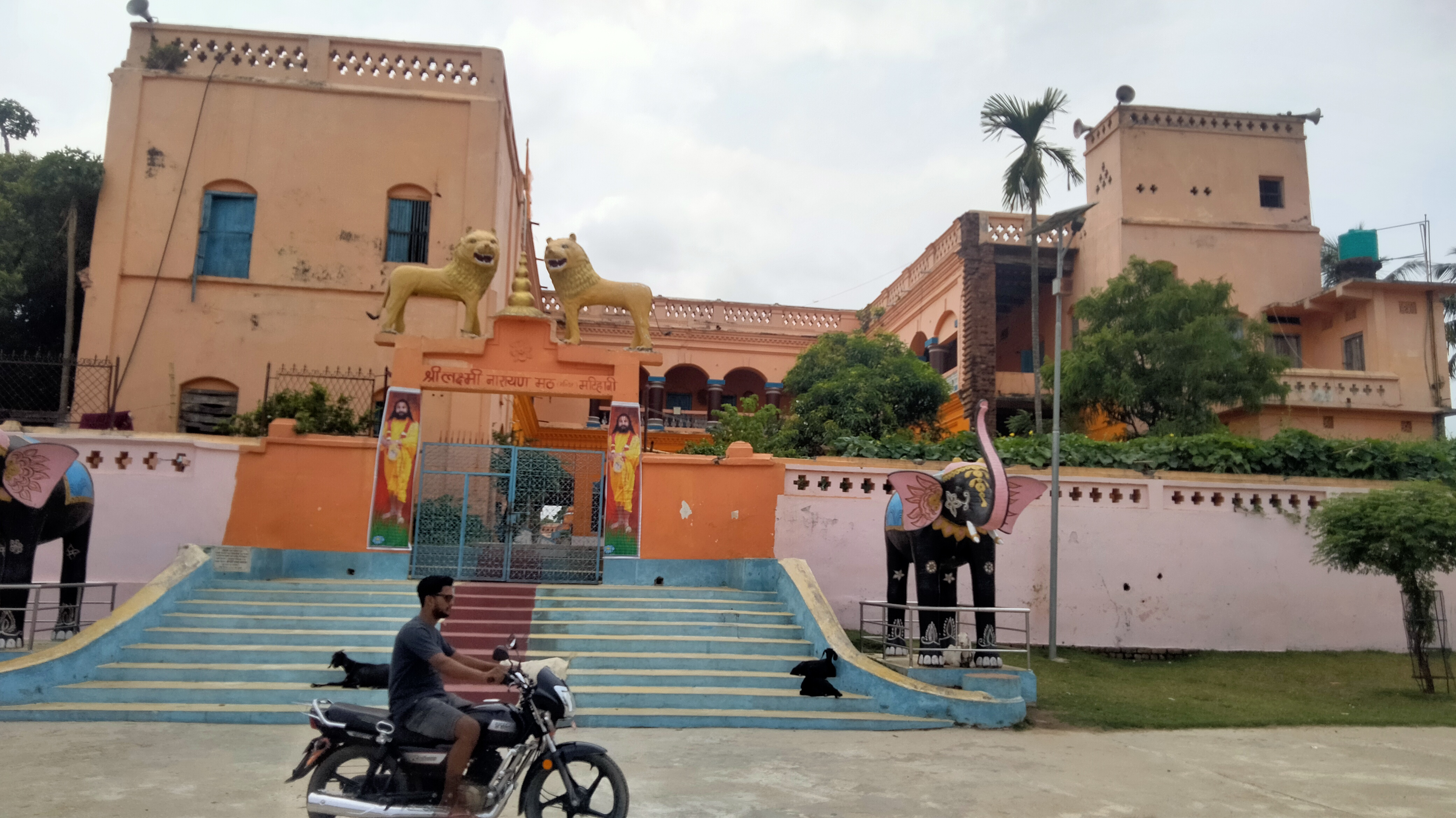
- View of the Shree Lakshminarayan Matha in Matihani

Religion
- Affiliation: Hinduism
- District: Mahottari
- Province: Madhesh Pradesh
- Deity: Lakshmi Narayan
- Festivals: Mithila Madhya Parikrama; Mithila Jhulnotsav
- Governing body: Mahant Jagannath Das Vaishnav

Location
- Location: Matihani
- Country: Nepal
- Interactive map of Lakshminarayan Matha
- Coordinates: 26.6126708°N 85.8454698°E

Architecture
- Founder: Tasmaiya Baba
- Established: 1694 CE
- Also known as Matihani Matha

Lakshminarayan Matha (Maithili: लक्ष्मीनारायण मठ) also known as Matihani Matha is an ancient Hindu monastery in the Mithila region of the Indian subcontinent. It is located in the Matihani town of the Mahottari district in Nepal. It is a major centre for Sanskrit and Vedic learning in the Mithila region. It is an apex institution for the Hindu religious matters in the region. The location of the monastery is associated with the Matkor ceremony of the marriage of Lord Rama and Goddess Sita in the Treta Yuga. It related to the epic Ramayana of Hinduism.

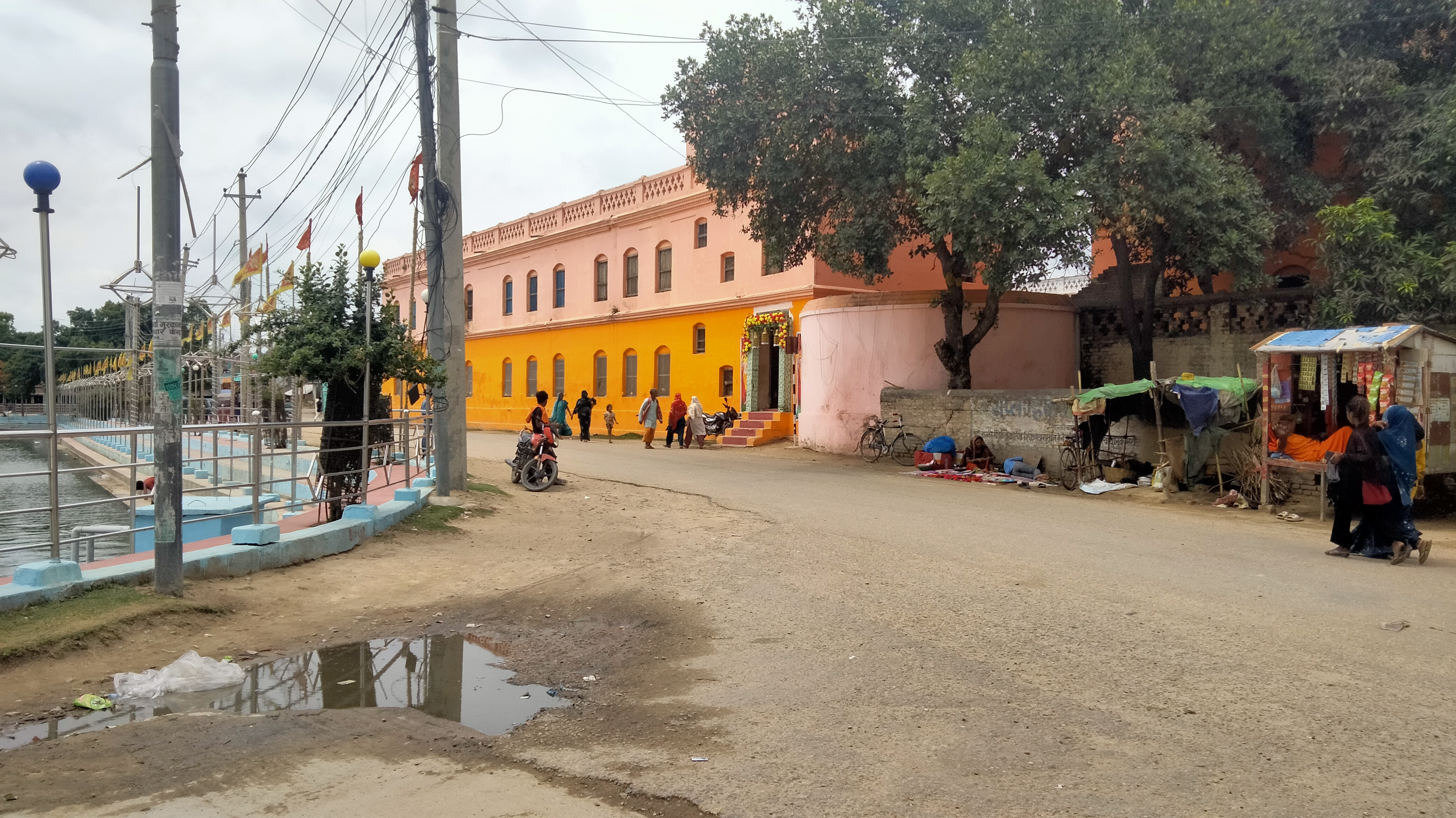
View of the Lakshminarayan Matha from south side

== Description ==
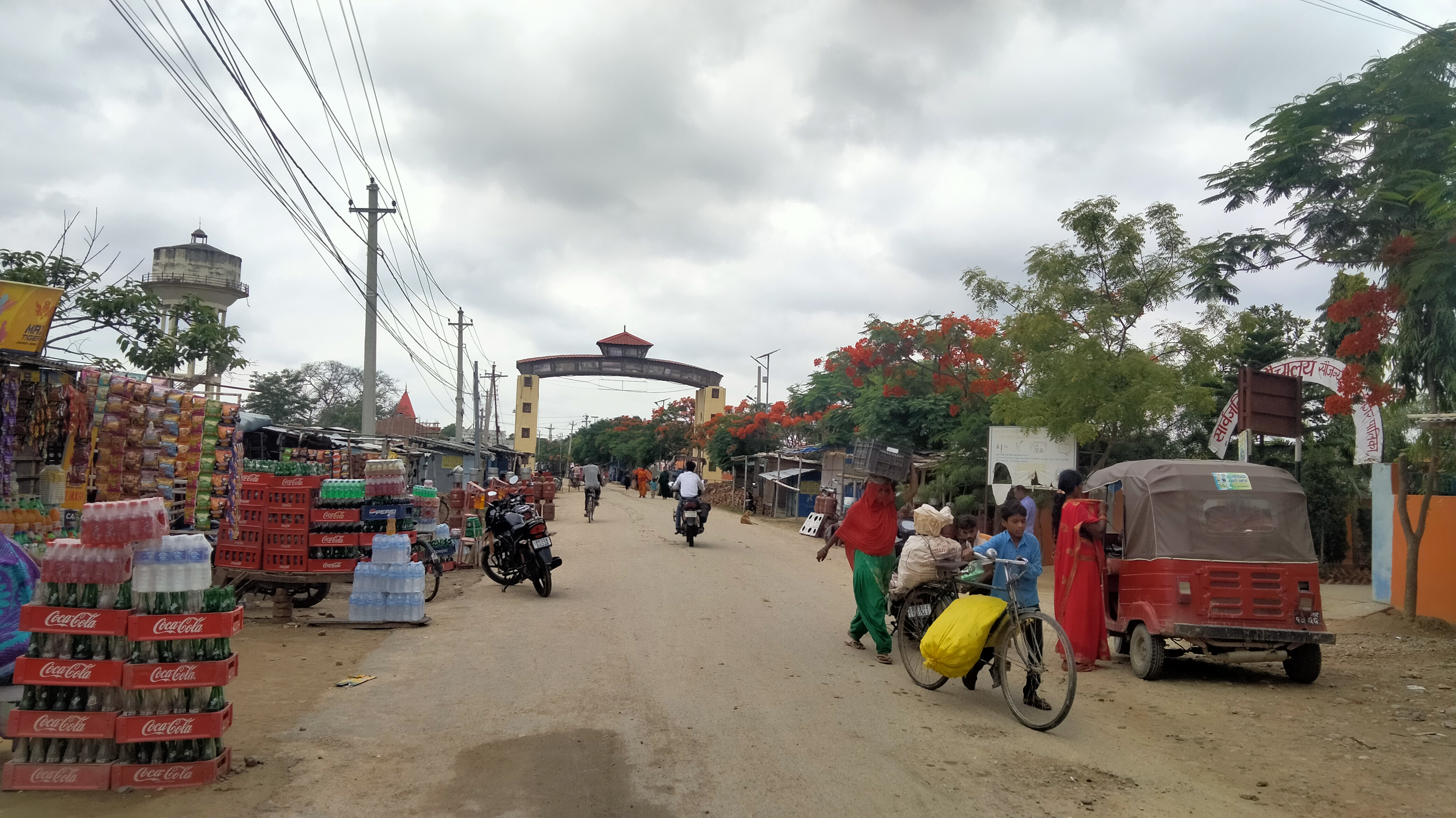
The main entrance gate of the campus of the Matihani Matha

The Lakshminarayan Matha is a major destination for the pilgrimage of the historical and spiritual journey of the Mithila Madhya Parikrama in the region. According to legend, it is believed that in the Treta Yuga of Ramayana, the ritual of Matkor was performed here before the marriage of Lord Rama and Goddess Sita. There is a sacred pond on the south side of the Matha believed to be location where the Matkor ritual was conducted in the Ramayana. According to the Mahant Jagannath Das Vaishnav of the monastery, the location is mentioned in the text Ramcharitmanas composed by the Awadhi poet Tulsi Das. The sacred pond is presently known as Lakshmi Sagar.

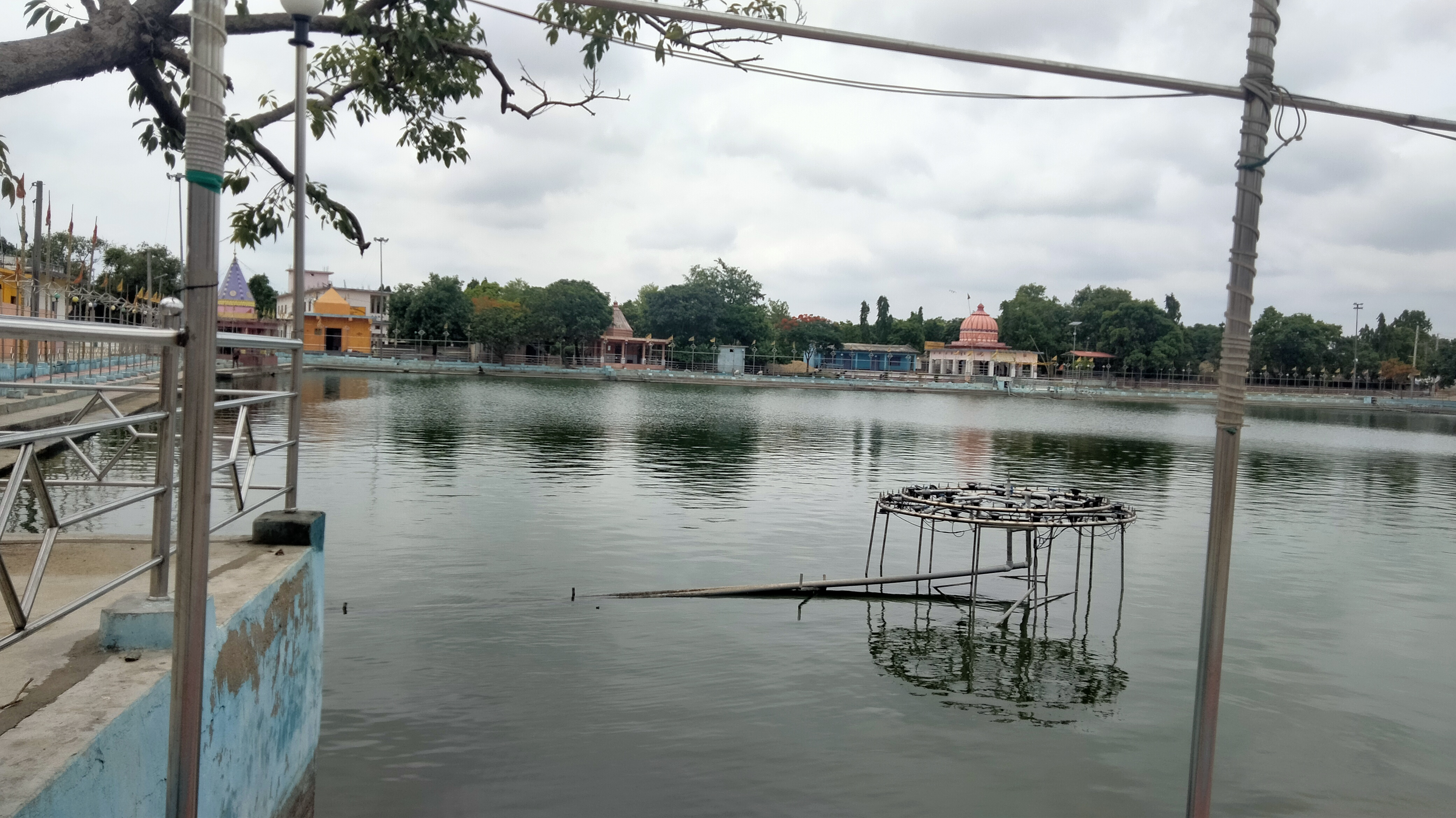
View of the sacred pond Lakshmi Sagar at Matihani Matha

The monastery comes under the tradition of the Vaishnava sect in Hinduism. It is the apex Hindu monastery of the Vaishnava sect in region. It is looked after and regulated by the Mahant of the monastery. The present Mahant of the monastery is Jagannath Das Vaishnav. He is also called as Jagannath Das Shastri. The main Mahant of the monastery is assisted by Chhota Mahant. The present Chhota Mahant of the monastery Dr. Ravindra Das Vaishnav. The main Mahant of the Matha holds an important place in the Himalayan nation of Nepal. During the monarchy era in Nepal, the Mahant of the Lakshminarayan Matha was the permanent ex officio guru of the royal court in the Kingdom.

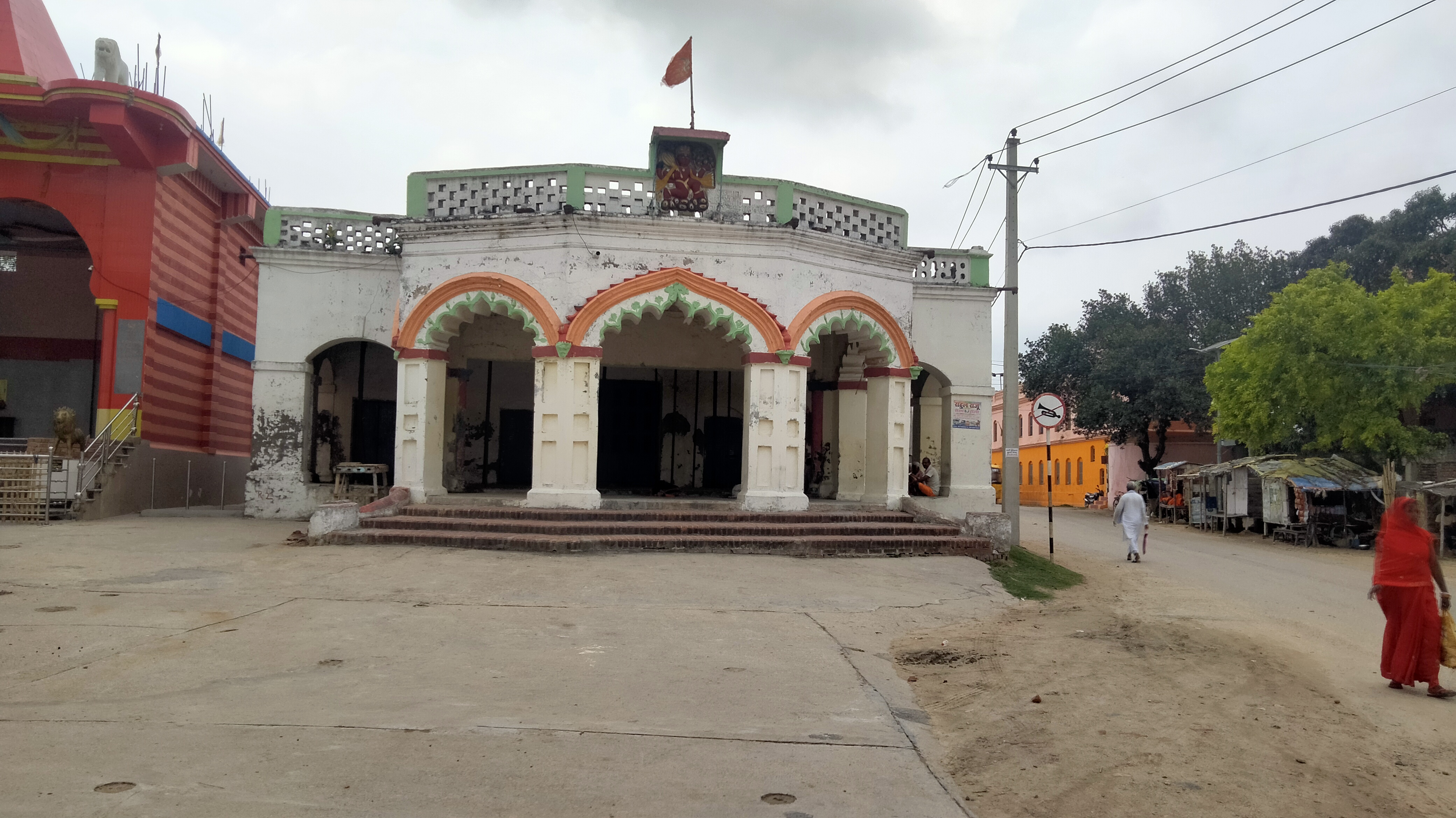
Ram Jhulan Bhawan in the campus of the Matihani Matha

== History ==
The Lakshminarayan Matha is the oldest matha in Nepal. Its history can be traced since 1694 AD (1751 B.S). The matha was founded by a Hindu saint named Ramdas Tasmaiya Baba residing near the location of the matha. There is still the Samadhi Sthal of the saint Tasmaiya Baba in the campus of the Matha. According to the author Chandrashekhar Upadhyay, the Lakshminarayan Mandir in the matha was rebuilt by the King Manik Sen of Makwanpur in 1709 AD (1766 BS). According to historians and an inscription found in Chandanimai of Makwanpur, a Sanskrit school was established in 1718 AD (1775 BS) at the Matha during the period of the King Manik Sen.

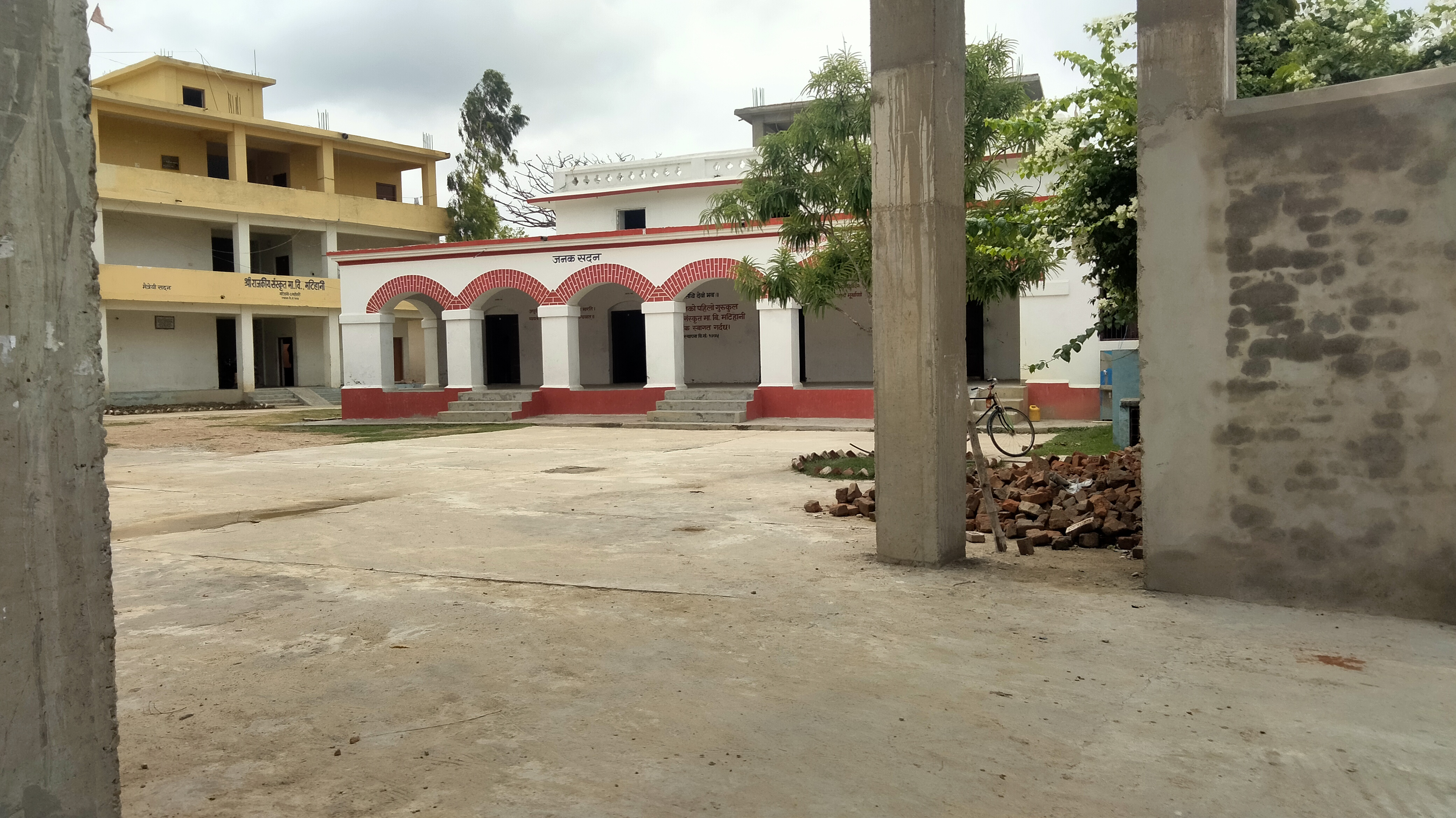
View of Janaka Sadan at Shree Rajkiya Sanskrit Madhyamik Vidyalaya in the campus of the Matihani Matha.

In 1744 CE (1801 BS), the higher educational institute named Yjnayavalkya Lakshminarayan Vidyapeeth for the study of Sanskrit and Vedic learning was established at the campus of the Matha.

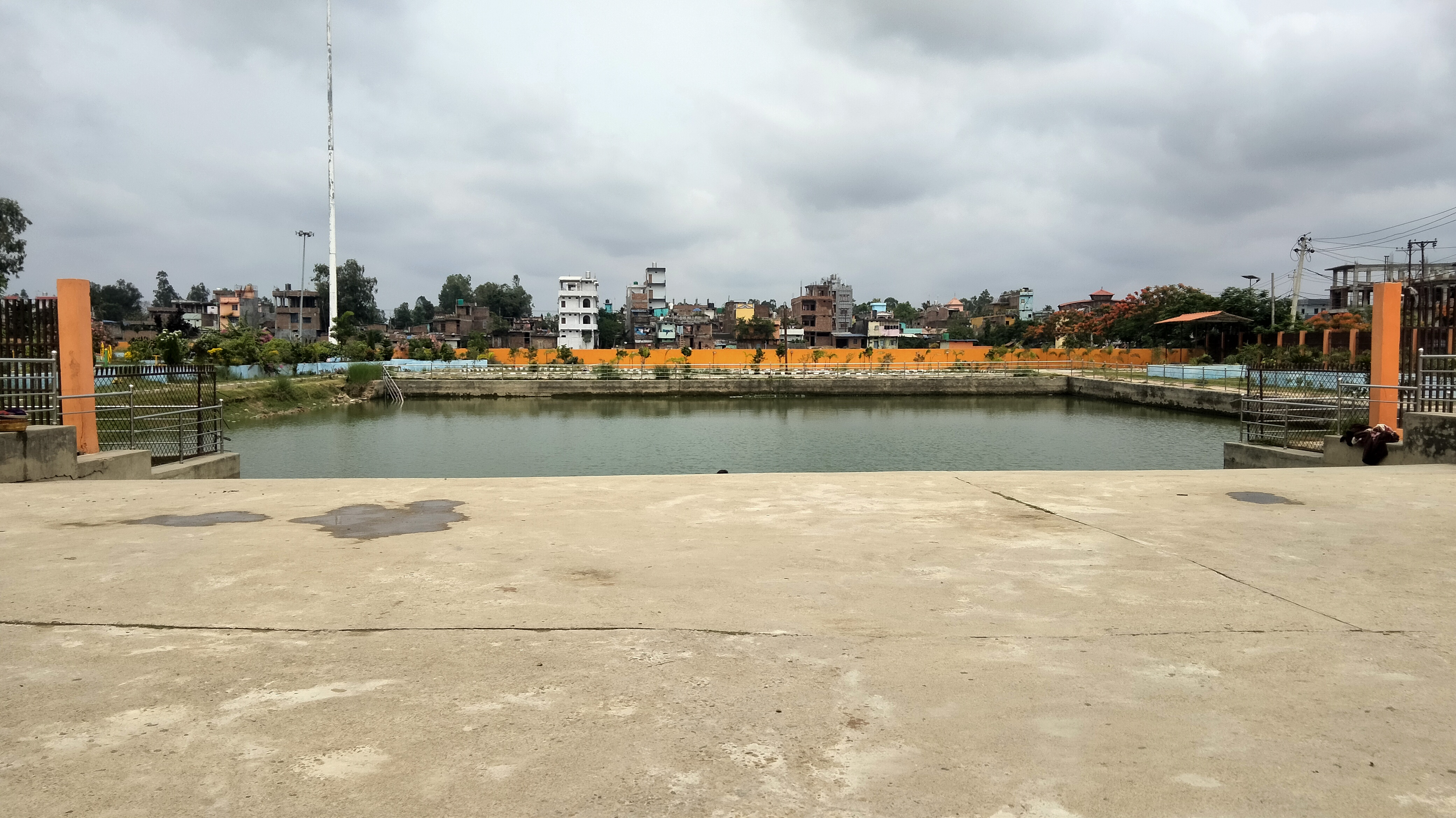
Tasmaiya Baba Park developed in the memory of Tasmaiya Baba on the eastern side of the main building of the Lakshminarayan Matha

In 2023, the longest national flag of Nepal was established at the Tasmaiya Baba Park developed on the eastern side of the Matha. The height of the pillar of the flag is 110 feet high. The length and the width of the flag are equal to 25 feet each.

== Legacy ==
In the year 2025, the Postal Services Department of the Nepal Government formally released a postage stamp with the image of the country's largest and historic monastery of Laxminarayan Matha to commemorate its cultural and historical legacy. The postage stamp features 10 rupee denomination along with a grand view of the Lakshminarayan Mandir in the monastery and a photograph of its exterior. A special ceremony was organised on the occasion of the inauguration of the postal stamp. It was unveiled by the Information and Communications Minister Jagdish Pokhrel of the country.
