= Bhola Baba Pahadi Mandir =

Lord Shiva temple in Mithila

- भोला बाबा पहाड़ी मंदिर
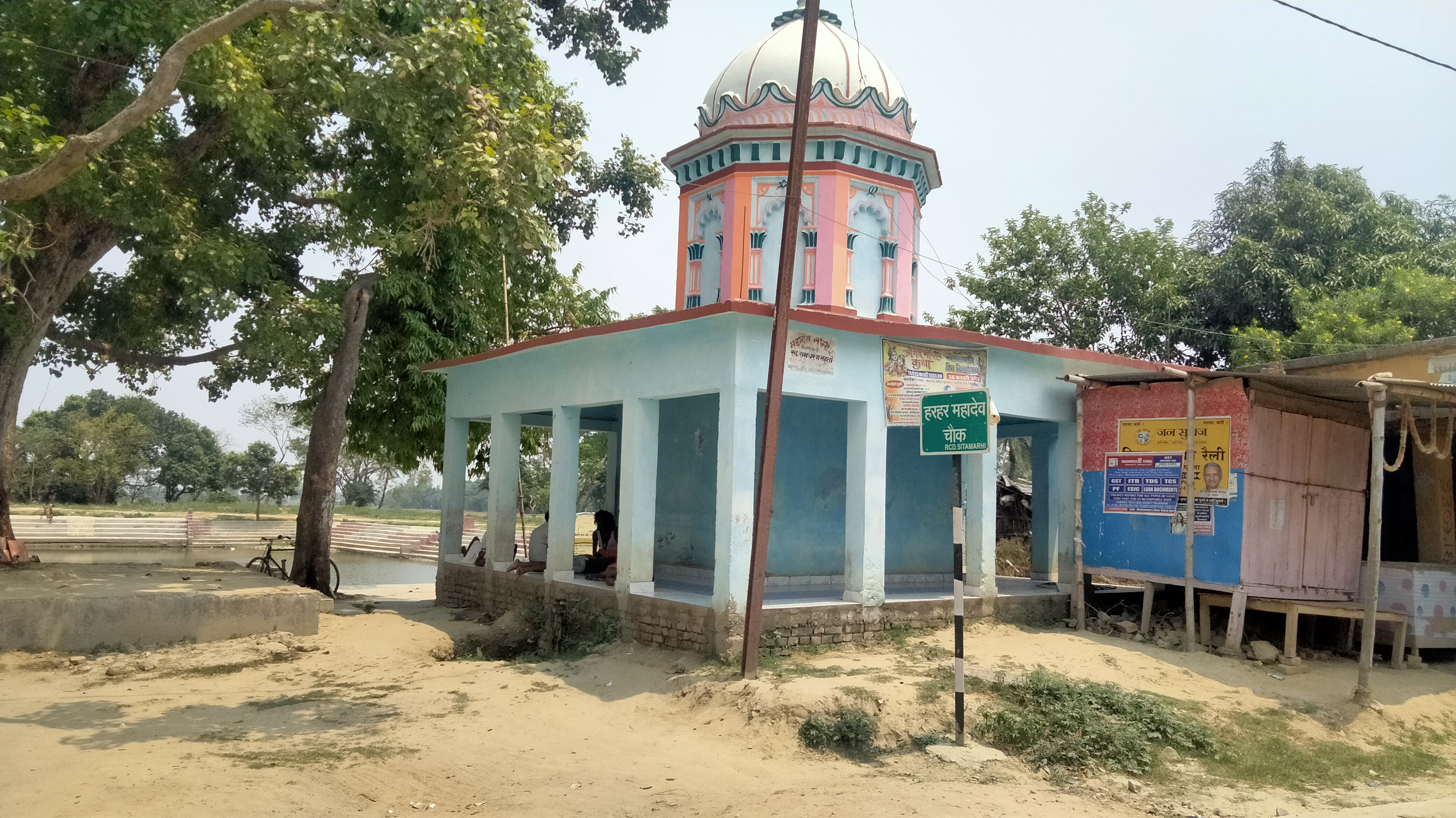
- Bhola Baba Pahadi Mandir in the Charaut town

Religion
- Affiliation: Hinduism
- District: Sitamarhi
- Deity: Lord Shiva
- Festival: Sawan Sombari, Mahashivratri

Location
- Location: Near High School, Charaut
- State: Bihar
- Country: India
- Interactive map of Bhola Baba Pahadi Mandir
- Coordinates: 26.5399252°N 85.7958338°E

Architecture
- Founder: Pahadi

Bhola Baba Pahadi Mandir (Maithili: भोला बाबा पहाड़ी मंदिर) is a Hindu temple of Lord Shiva in the Mithila region. It is an old temple dedicated to Lord Shiva in the Charaut town of the Sitamarhi district of Bihar in India. The temple is the center of faith and attraction for the people in the region of the Sitamarhi district as well as the devotees of the neighbouring Himalayan nation Nepal. During the festival of Sawan Sombari a large number of devotees arrive at the temple for performing the sacred ritual Jalabhisheka on the Shivalinga of the temple. The temple is simply also called as Pahadi Mandir.

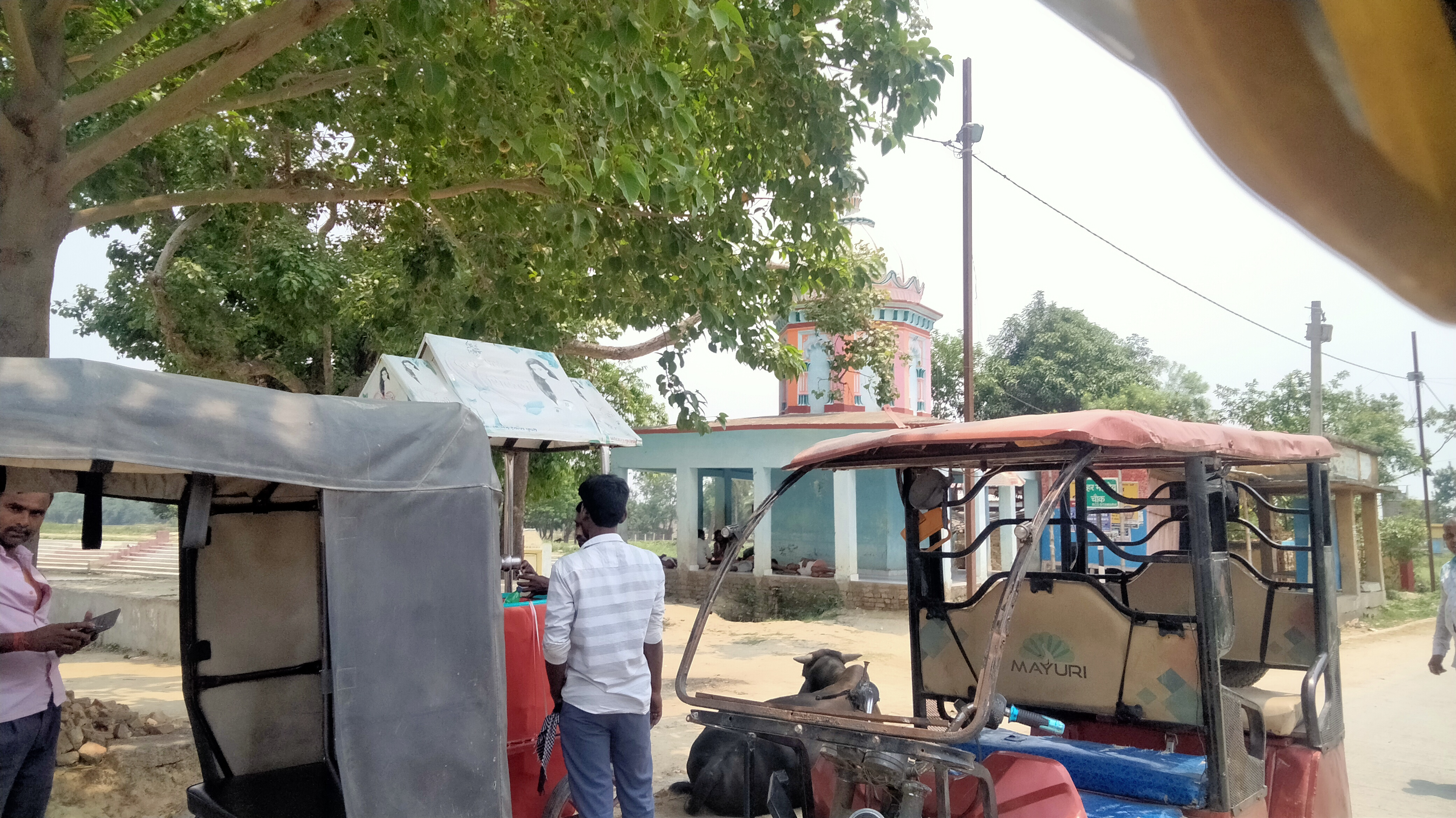
View of the Bhola Baba Pahadi Mandir from the National Highway-227

== History ==
The exact date of the foundation of the temple is unknown. It is estimated to be more than hundred years old. According to the local residents, it is said that hundreds of years ago there was a Shivalinga at the root of the Peepal tree there. The villagers used to perform the sacred ritual Jalabhisheka on that Shivalinga. Once a devotee named Pahadi came to the Shivalinga. He made a wish to Bhole Baba (Lord Shiva). When the wish was fulfilled, he built the temple with the help of the villagers there. The Shivalinga was established in the temple. Later, the temple came to be known as Pahadi Mandir.
