= Pupri =

Town of Mithila region in Bihar

Pupri पुपरी Janakpur Road
- Town
- Pupri
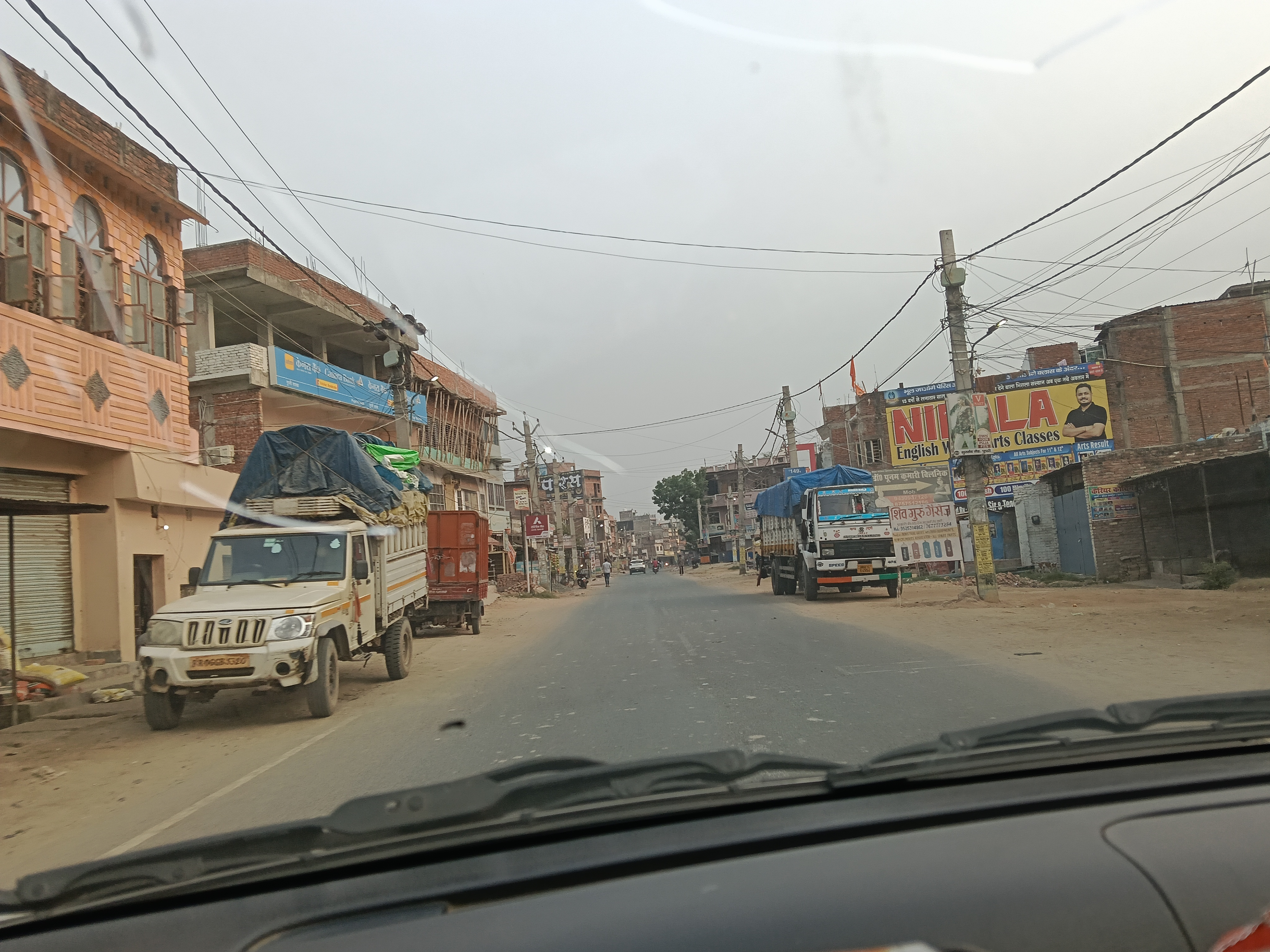
- View of the Pupri town
- Interactive map of Pupri
- Coordinates (Sub-Divisional Office): 26.4636363°N 85.6989642°E
- Country: India
- State: Bihar
- Region: Mithila region
- District: Sitamarhi district
- Demonym: Maithil

Language
  - Official: Hindi

Language
  - Mother language: Maithili

Pupri (Maithili: पुपरी) is an Indian town in the Sitamarhi district of the Mithila region in Bihar. It is also known as Janakpur Road.

Pupri is a sub-divisional town as well as the headquarter of the Pupri block in the Sitamarhi district. There are 6 blocks in the region of the Pupri sub-division. Similarly in the region of the Pupri block, there are one Nagar Panchayat and 13 Gram Panchyats consisting of 45 villages.

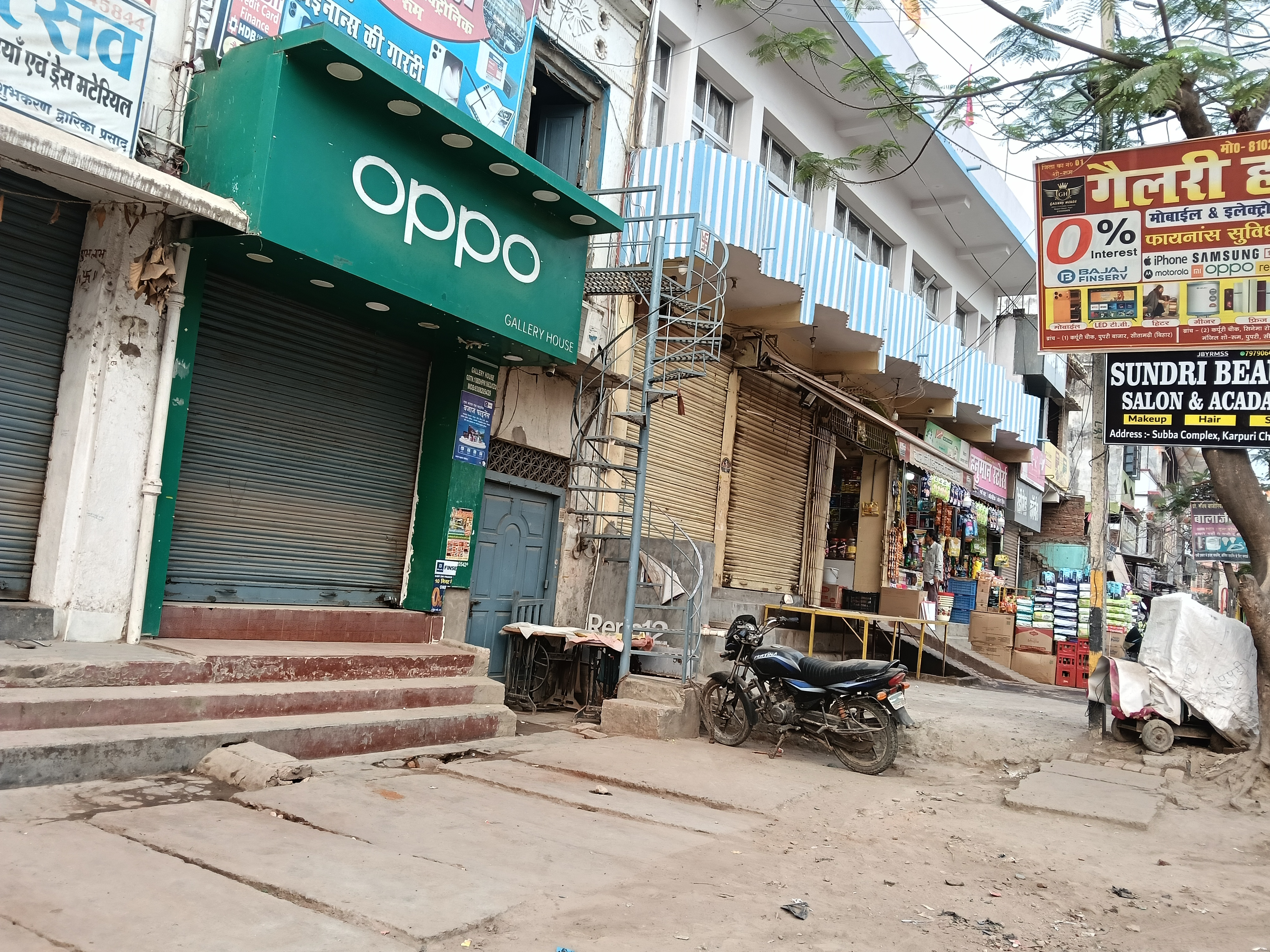
View of shops in a market area of the Pupri town.

== Etymology ==
The earlier original name of the town was Punya Puri. The literal meaning of the Indic word Punya is sacred and Puri means a town. Thus the literal meaning of Punya Puri is a sacred town. Later it was called as Pupri.

== Geography ==
Pupri is located at a distance of approximately 140 kms from the state capital city Patna and 28 kms from the district headquarter Sitamarhi.

== History ==
In 1992, Sitamarhi East subdivision of the Sitamarhi district was renamed as Pupri subdivision. On 17 March 1992, the town of Pupri was made the headquarter of the Pupri subdivision.

== Description ==
The major locations of market areas in the town of Pupri are Tower Chowk, Karpuri Chowk, Station Road , Nageshwar Sthan, Cinema Road and Lohapatti etc. There is a railway station in the town called as Janakpur Road railway station which is connected to the Darbhanga Junction, Sitamarhi railway station and also to the major metropolitan cities of Delhi and Mumbai in the country.

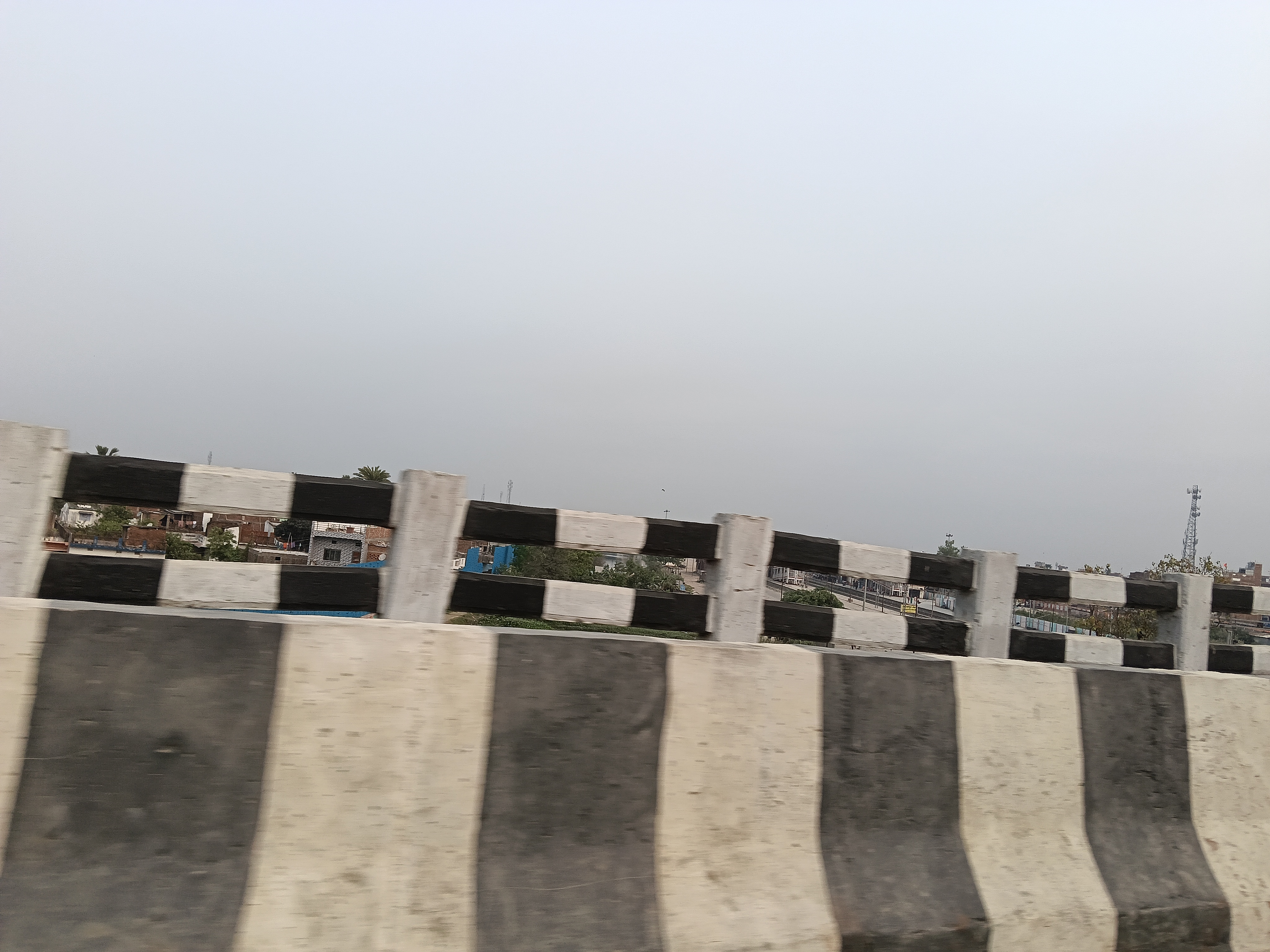
Sky view from a flyover in the town.

== Tourism ==
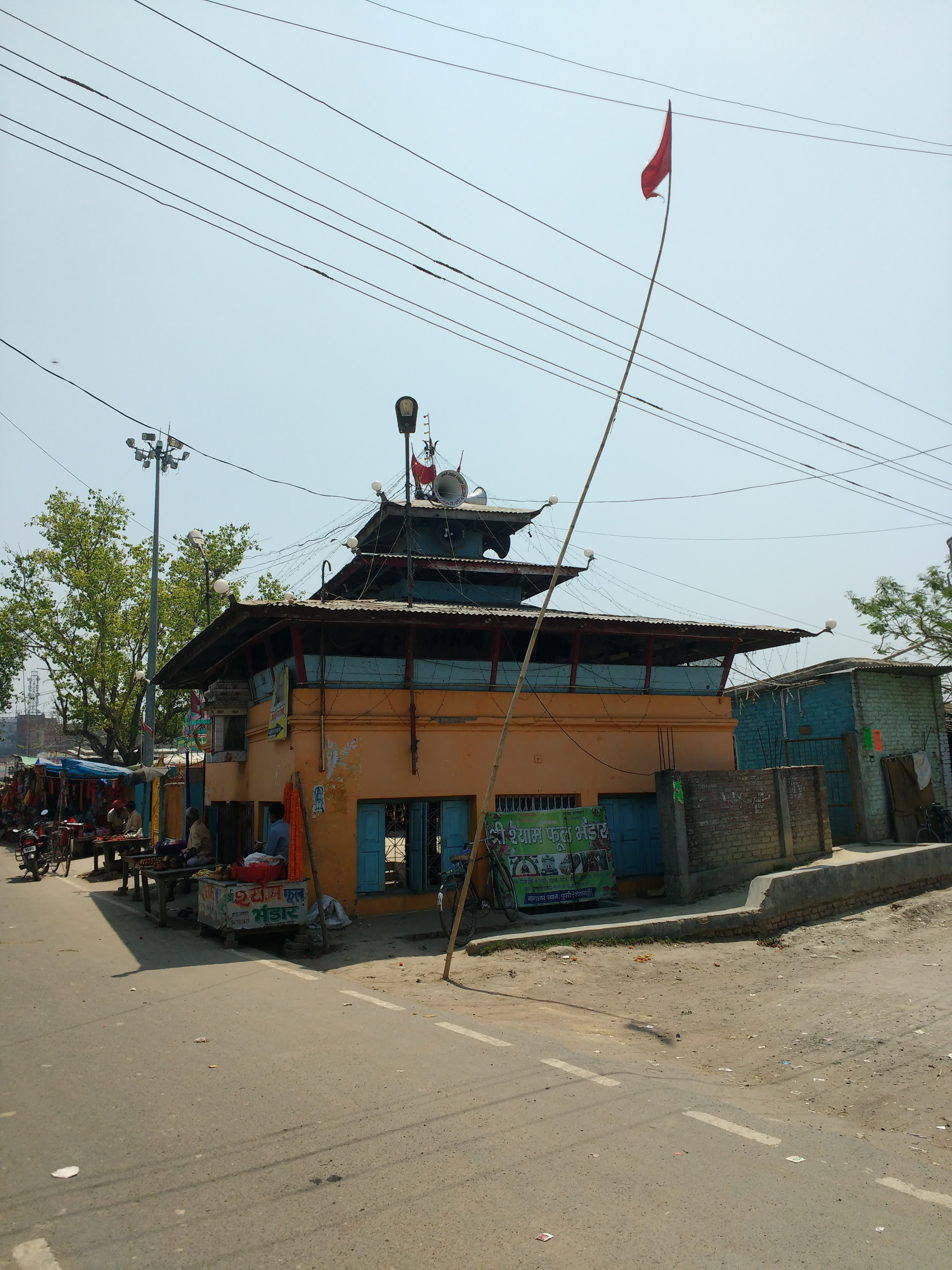
The teertha of the Nageshwar Nath Mahadev Mandir.

The Nageshwar Nath Mahadev Mandir is the main Tirtha in the town of Pupri. It was built in the style of Nepalese architectural design of the famous Pashupatinath Mandir in Kathmandu. The other prominent tirtha in the territory of the Nagar panchayat in Pupri is Maharani Sthan. It is located at Jhazhihat. It is the major religious center of the town. It is the common Maharani Sthan of the villages Hardia, Jhajihat, Bahma, Jaitpur, Rajbagh and Pupri Bazar.
