= Shanti Mishra =

Nepali litterateur (1938–2019)

- शान्ति मिश्र
- Born: Shanti Shrestha; 22 June 1938; Jhochhen, Kathmandu
- Died: 15 May 2019 (aged 80); Indianapolis, Indiana, United States
- Education: MA (History, Library Science)
- Alma mater: Vanderbilt University
- Occupations: Lecturer, librarian, writer, translator
- Known for: First Nepali female librarian
- Spouse: Narayan Mishra (m. 1970)
- Children: 1
- Parents: Janaki Lal Shrestha; Krishna Devi Shrestha

Shanti Mishra (née Shrestha; 22 June 1938 – 15 May 2019) was a Nepali lecturer, librarian, writer and translator. She was the first Nepali female full-time lecturer and first Nepali female librarian. She was the first female librarian of Tribhuvan University Central Library. She also served as the founding director of PEN chapter of Nepal.

== Early life and education ==
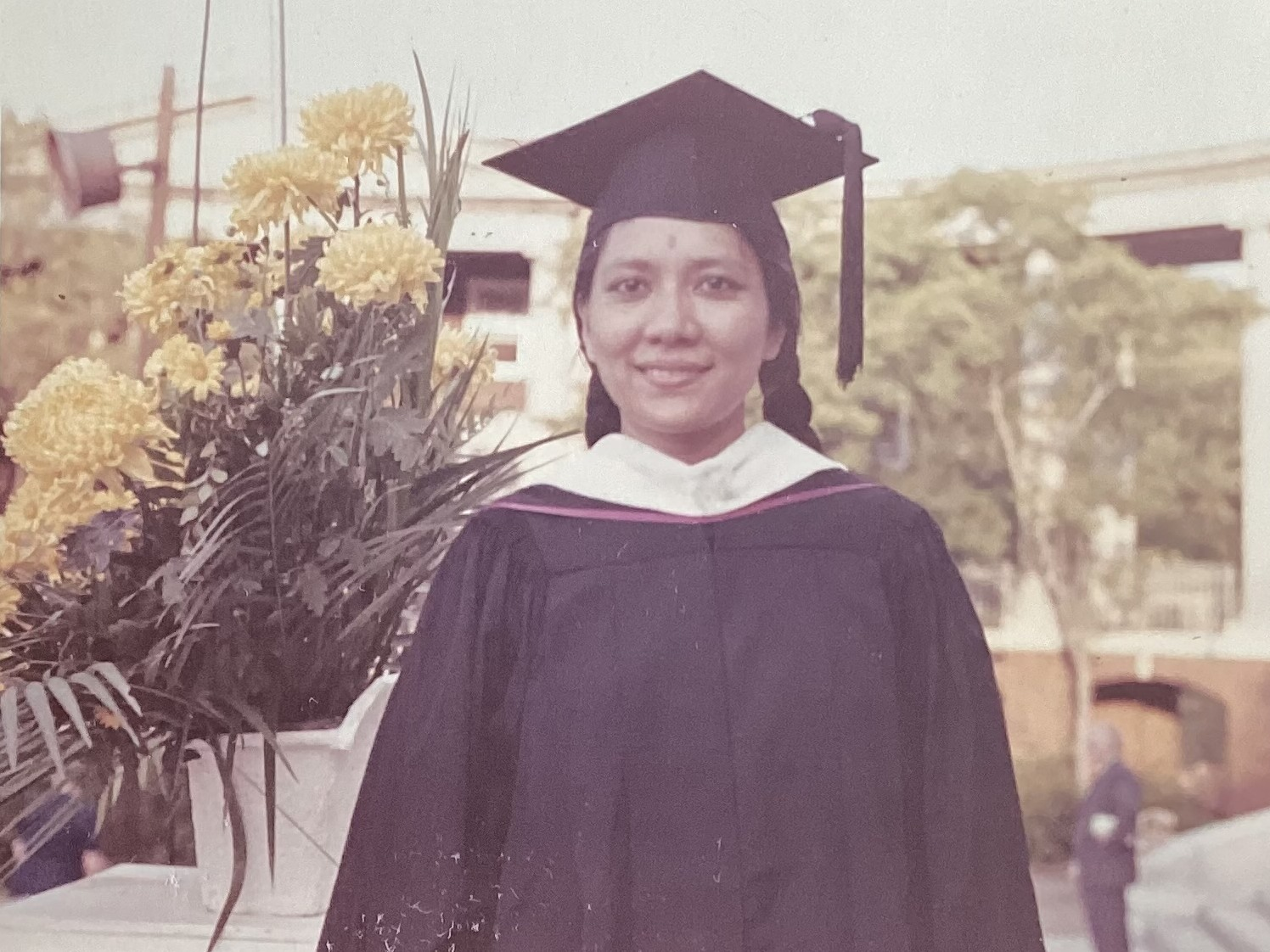
Mishra at her Master of Library Science Graduation ceremony in the USA in 1963

Mishra was born on 22 June 1938 (7 Ashadh 1995 BS) in Jhochhen, Kathmandu, as the eldest daughter to father Janaki Lal Shrestha and mother Krishna Devi Shrestha. She had one younger brother and a younger sister.

She received her IA and BA degree from Scottish Church College, Calcutta and an MA degree in history from Calcutta University. In 1959, when the Tribhuvan University Central Library was established, she received an opportunity to study library science in USA. She received an MA degree in library science from George Peabody Library School, Vanderbilt University.

== Professional career ==
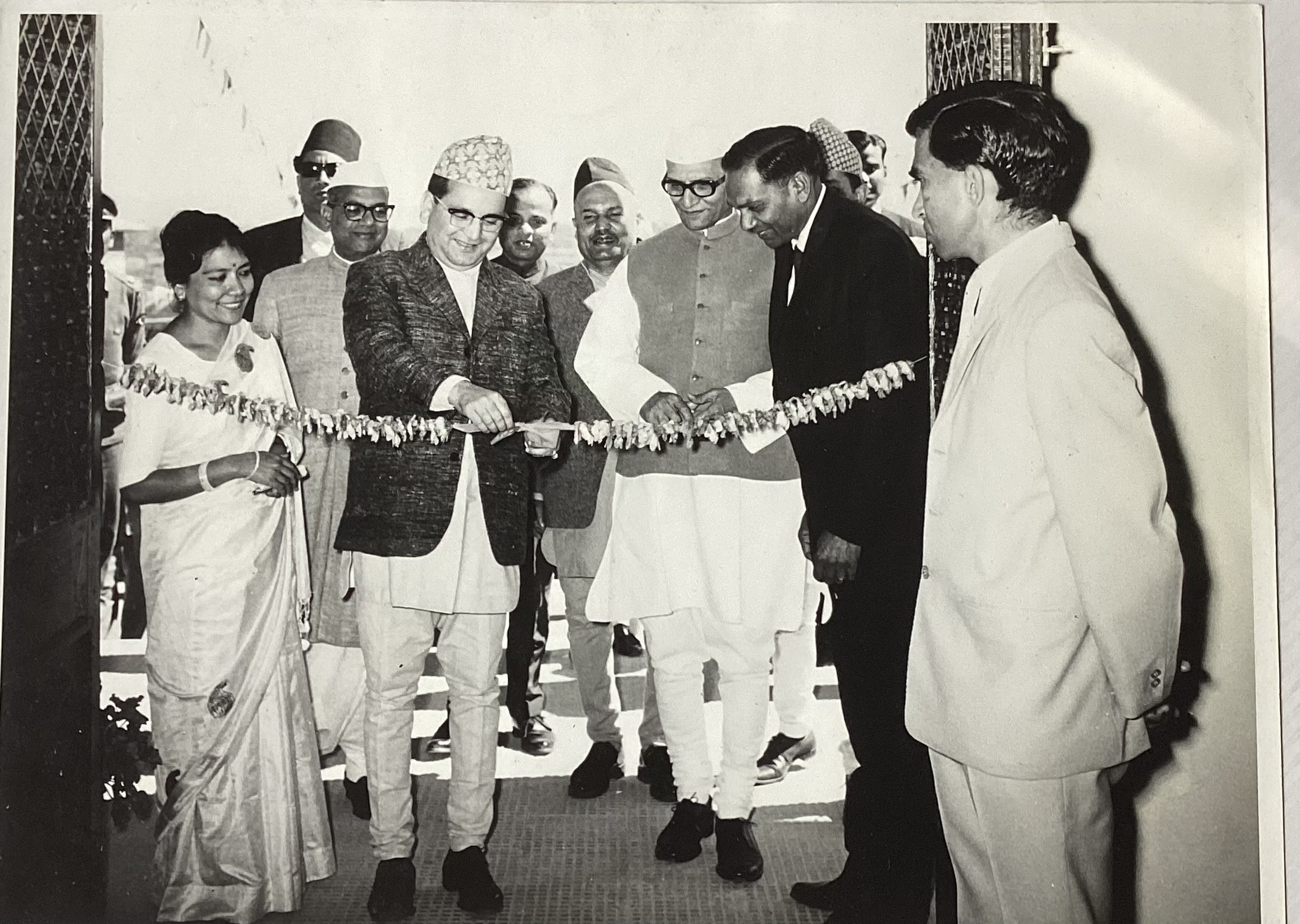
Mishra at the inauguration of the TU Central Library Building at Kirtipur in the presence of the then Prime Minister Surya Bahadur Thapa and the Deputy Prime Minister of India Morarji Desai

She returned to Nepal in 1962. She was appointed as the Chief Librarian of TU Central Library on 1 May 1963 (18 Baisakh 2020 BS). The library was initially at Tripureshwor and shifted to Kirtipur in 1967. During a visit by British educationalists in her tenure in 1969, the library was announced as "almost unique in Southeast Asia". The visit was covered by the BBC and the library became a token of pride in the country. She worked in Tribhuvan University for three decades.

She, with her husband wrote a book on library science titled Pustakalaya Bigyan ko Ruprekha. The book was published in 2038 BS (1981-1982). She then wrote a memoir Voice of Truth: The Challenges and Struggles of a Nepalese Woman, depicting the hardships of a woman in South-Asia. The book was published in 1994. She also wrote Tri. Vi. Kendriya Pustakalaya ko Gaurabshali Kahani ra Hamro Sewa, a book on the history of TU Central library, co-written with her husband. She retired in 2049 BS (1992-1993).

She also served as the Member-Secretary of the International Women's Year Committee of Nepal in 1975. She was one of the signing members for the establishment of the PEN chapter in Nepal alongside prominent writers such as Greta Rana, Toya Gurung, Ashesh Malla, Bhuwan Dhungana, Dhruba Chandra Gautam, etc. She served as the founding director of the PEN International Nepal.

She also served as Chairman of Martin Chautari, Advisor to the Sancharika Samuha (Women Media Group), UNESCO Consultant for the construction of a modern library in Bhutan in 1985 and the Vice-Chairman of the Rudra Raj Pandey Sahitya Sewa Samiti. Mishra was also an honorary member of the United Nations Women's Organization and the Active Women of Nepal.

== Bibliography ==
- Pustakalaya Bigyan ko Ruprekha (transl. An overview of library science; 2038 BS (1981-1982), co-written with Narayan Mishra)
- Voice of Truth: The Challenges and Struggles of a Nepalese Woman (1994)
- A Widow's Gift (Novel, 2008)
- Tri. Vi. Kendriya Pustakalaya ko Gaurabshali Kahani ra Hamro Sewa (transl. Glorious Story of TU Central Library and Our Service; 2018, co-written with Narayan Mishra)

Translation

- Rupamati (1999, written by Rudra Raj Pande)

== Personal life and death ==
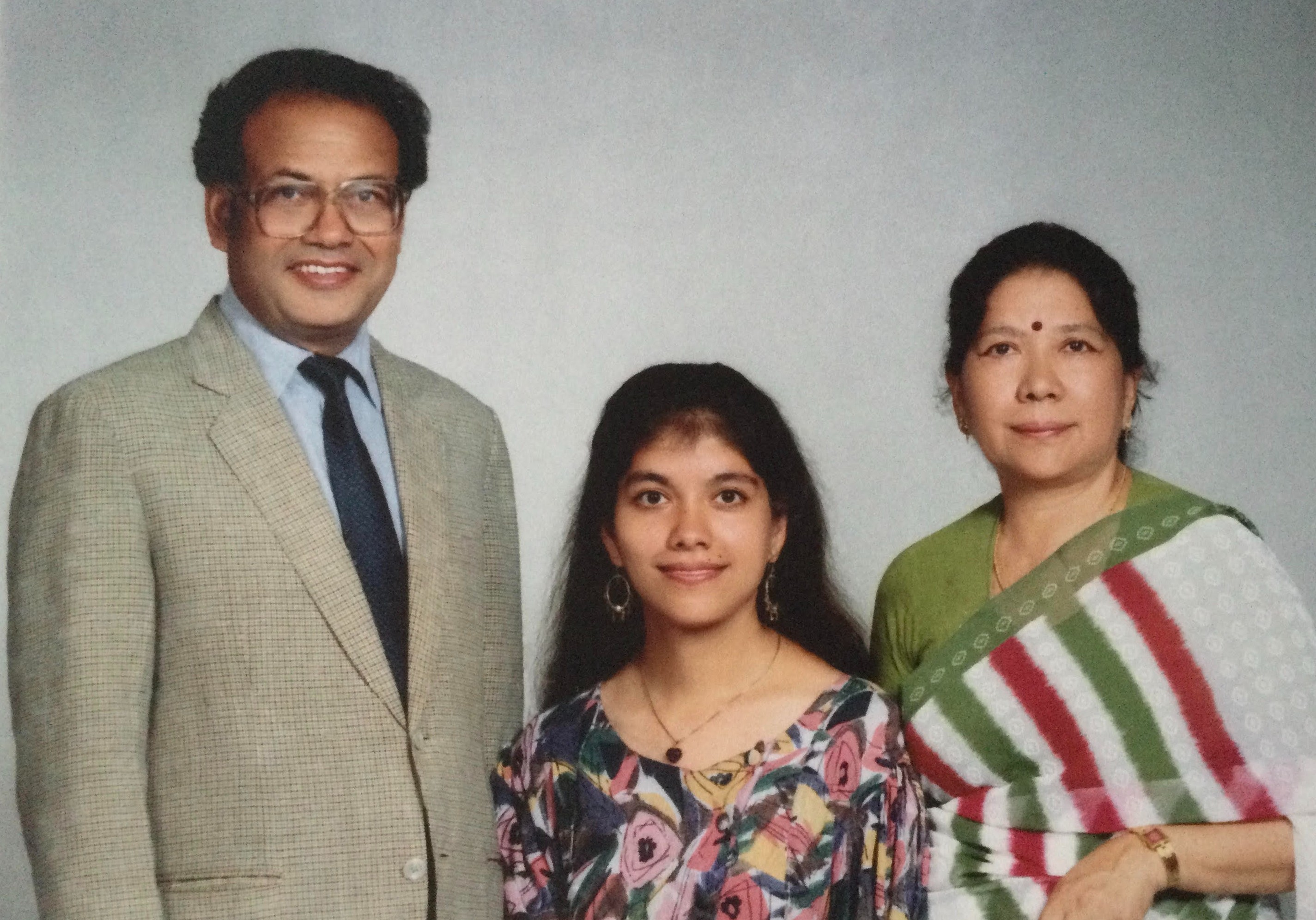
Shanti Mishra with her husband Narayan Prasad Mishra (left) and daughter Pragya Mishra (centre)

She married Narayan Mishra, a co-worker on 8 May 1970 (25 Baisakh 2027 BS). They had a daughter, born in 1971.

She moved to the US for her health treatment in June 2018 with her husband. She was suffering from gall bladder cancer. She died on 15 May 2019 (1 Jestha 2076 BS) in Indianapolis, Indiana. She is survived by her husband and her daughter.

== Honours and legacy ==
She received the International Library Movement Award from India for her extraordinary contribution to the library sector. In 2010, a fund of NPR 433,000 was established to award Narayan-Shanti Mishra Gold Medal and Shanti-Narayan Mishra Gold Medal to the first place student at the postgraduate level in journalism and library science respectively in Tribhuvan University.

In 2021, her husband donated their book collection worth 3 million NPR to TU Central library. The donated 1670 books were displayed in the Library in the name of the Shanti Narayan Collection.
