= India–Nepal relations =

- India: Nepal

Diplomatic mission
- Embassy of India, Kathmandu: Embassy of Nepal, New Delhi

Envoy
- Indian Ambassador to Nepal Naveen Srivastava: Nepalese Ambassador to India Dr. Shankar Sharma

The Republic of India and the Federal Democratic Republic of Nepal initiated relations with the 1950 India–Nepal Treaty of Peace and Friendship and accompanying secret letters that defined security relations between the two countries, and an agreement governing both bilateral trade and trade transiting Indian territory. The relationship between the two nations of India and Nepal is often known as Roti-Beti ka Rishta.

The Nepalese Foreign Minister Shisir Khanal describes the bilateral relation as

"We're not merely neighbours on the map; we're children of the same rivers"

— Shisir Khanal

== History ==
The Licchavis of Nepal originated from a branch of the Licchavis of Vaishali who ruled in the territories of modern-day Bihar, India.

Parts of modern-day India and Nepal were part of the Maurya Empire.

Narendra Rajya Laxmi Devi, queen consort to King Prithvi Narayan Shah of the Kingdom of Nepal and mother of future King Pratap Singh Shah, was a daughter of Abhiman Singh, a Rajput chief from Varanasi, in present-day India.

== Independent political history ==
=== 1950–1971 ===
The foundation of relations between India and Nepal was laid with the Indo-Nepalese friendship Treaty in 1950. In the 1950s, the Rana rulers of the Kingdom of Nepal welcomed close relations with the newly independent India, fearing a China-backed communist overthrow of their autocratic regime after the success of Communist Revolution in China by the Chinese Communist Party (CPC) and the establishment of the People's Republic of China on 1 October 1949, as a form of Marxist-Leninist government. Rana rule in Nepal however collapsed within three months of signing the 1950 Indo-Nepal Treaty of Peace and Friendship, to be replaced by the only pro-Indian party of the time – Nepali Congress. In 1951, following the entry of the People's Liberation Army (PLA) into Tibet, the Tibetan government signed the Seventeen Point Agreement on 23 May 1951, which acknowledged Chinese sovereignty over the region, where Tibet became annexed with Communist China in October 1951. As the number of Indians living and working in Nepal's Terai region increased and the involvement of India in Nepal's politics deepened in the 1960s and after, so too did Nepal's discomfort with the special relationship. India's influence over Nepal increased throughout the 1950s. The Nepalese Citizenship Act of 1952 granted Indians the right to immigrate to Nepal and acquire Nepalese citizenship without any difficulty, which caused resentment in Nepal. This policy remained in effect until 1962, when several restrictive clauses were added to the Nepalese constitution. Further, in 1952, an Indian military mission was established in Nepal, which consisted of a Major General and 20 other Indian army personnel, which was later extended to 197 in total. At the same time, Nepal's Royal family's dissatisfaction with India's growing influence began to emerge. As a consequence, overtures to China were initiated by Nepal as a counterweight to India.

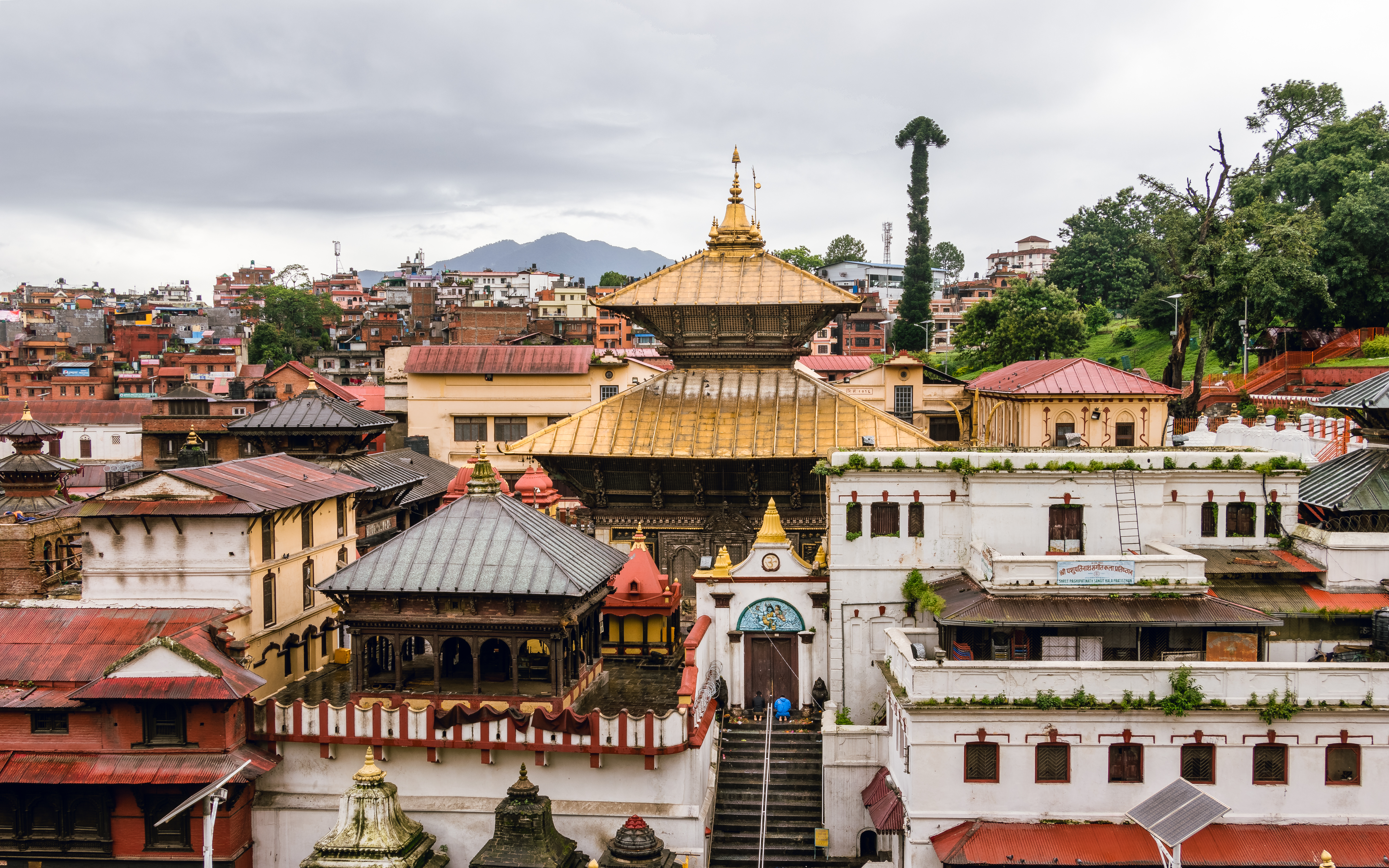
Lord Shiva's Pashupatinath Temple in Nepal

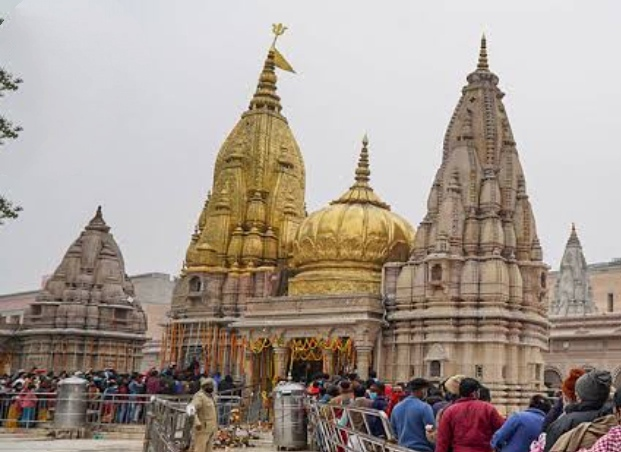
Lord Shiva's Kashi Vishwanath Temple in India

The Treaty of Trade and Commerce between the two countries was ratified in October 1950, wherein India acknowledged Nepal's right to import and export commodities through the Indian territories and ports. As per the treaty, customs duties could not be levied on commodities that were in transit through India.

Following the 1962 Sino-Indian border war, the relationship between Nepal and India thawed significantly. India suspended its support to India-based Nepalese opposition forces, opposing the dissolution of democratic government by King Mahendra. The defeat of Indian forces in 1962 in a border war with China, provided Nepal with the much-needed breathing space and Nepal extracted several concessions in trade with India. In exchange, through a secret accord concluded in 1965, similar to an arrangement that had been suspended in 1963, India won a monopoly on arms sales to Nepal.

In 1969, relations between both countries again became stressful as Nepal challenged the existing mutual security arrangement and asked that the Indian security checkposts and liaison group be withdrawn. Resentment also was expressed against the 1950s TPF. India withdrew its military check-posts and liaison group consisting of 23 military personnel in 1970 from all but Kalapani area of Nepal, although the treaty was not abrogated.

Tensions further increased in the mid-1970s, when Nepal pressed for substantial changes in the trade and transit treaty and openly denounced Sikkim's 1975 annexation by India. In 1975 King Birendra Bir Bikram Shah Dev against the backdrop of Indian annexation of Nepal's close neighbor the Kingdom of Sikkim proposed Nepal to be recognized internationally as a 'Zone of Peace' where military competition would be off limits. Nepal's proposal immediately received support from Pakistan and China, but not from India. In New Delhi's view, if the king's proposal did not contradict the 1950 treaty that the-then Indian government had signed with the Rana rulers of Nepal, it was unnecessary; if it was a repudiation of the special relationship, it represented a possible threat to India's security and could not be endorsed. In 1984 Nepal repeated the proposal, but there was no reaction from India. Nepal continually promoted the proposal in international forums and by 1990 it had won the support of 112 countries including the US, the UK, and France.

=== 1970–1990 ===
In 1978 India agreed to separate trade and transit treaties, satisfying a long-term Nepalese demand. However, much to the annoyance of Nepalese Royal Palace and in continued violation of the 1950s PFT, India consistently allowed the opposition parties of Nepal to use Indian soil to launch agitation against the Nepalese government and refused to endorse Nepal as a Zone of Peace. In 1988, when the two treaties were up for renewal, Nepal refused to accommodate India's wishes for a single trade and transit treaty stating that 'it violates the principle of freedom to trade'. Thereafter, both India and Nepal took a hard-line position that led to a serious crisis in bilateral relations. Nepalese leaders asserted the position that as per the UN charter, transit privileges were "a fundamental and a permanent right of a land-locked country" and thus India's demand for a single treaty was unacceptable. After two extensions, the two treaties expired on 23 March 1989, resulting in a virtual Indian economic blockade of Nepal that lasted until late April 1990.

Over the years, Indian economic sanctions over Nepal steadily widened. For example, preferential customs and transit duties on Nepalese goods entering or passing through India (whether imports or exports) were discontinued. Thereafter India let agreements relating to oil processing and warehouse space in Calcutta for goods destined for Nepal expire. Aside from these sanctions, India cancelled all trade credits it had previously extended to Nepal on a routine basis.

To withstand the renewed pressure from India, Nepal undertook a major diplomatic initiative and presented its case on trade and transit matters to the world community.

In 1989, Nepal decoupled its rupee from the Indian rupee which had been circulating in Nepal freely. This further strained the relationship between the two countries. India retaliated by denying port facilities in Calcutta to Nepal, thereby preventing delivery of oil supplies from Singapore and other source countries. In historian Enayetur Rahim's view, "the economic consequences of the dispute... were enormous. Nepal's GDP growth rate plummeted from 9.7% in 1988 to 1.5% in 1989. This had a lot to do with the decreased availability of goods. Shortly after the imposition of sanctions, Nepal experienced serious deficiencies of important goods such as coal, fuel, oil, medicine and spare parts. Nepal also suffered economically from higher tariffs, the closure of border points and the tense political atmosphere. From one of the most thriving economies in Asia, Nepal was now quickly finding itself in the league of World's poorest nation." Although economic issues were a major factor in the two countries' confrontation, Indian dissatisfaction with Nepal's decision to impose work permits over Indians living in Nepal and Nepal government's attempt to acquire Chinese weaponry in 1988 played an important role. India linked security with economic relations and insisted on reviewing India–Nepal relations as a whole. After failing to receive support from wider international community, Nepalese government backed down from its position to avoid the worsening economic conditions. Indian government, with the help of Nepalese opposition parties operating from India, managed to bring a change in Nepal's political system, in which the king was forced to institute a parliamentary democracy. The new government, led by pro-India parties, sought quick restoration of amicable relations with India.

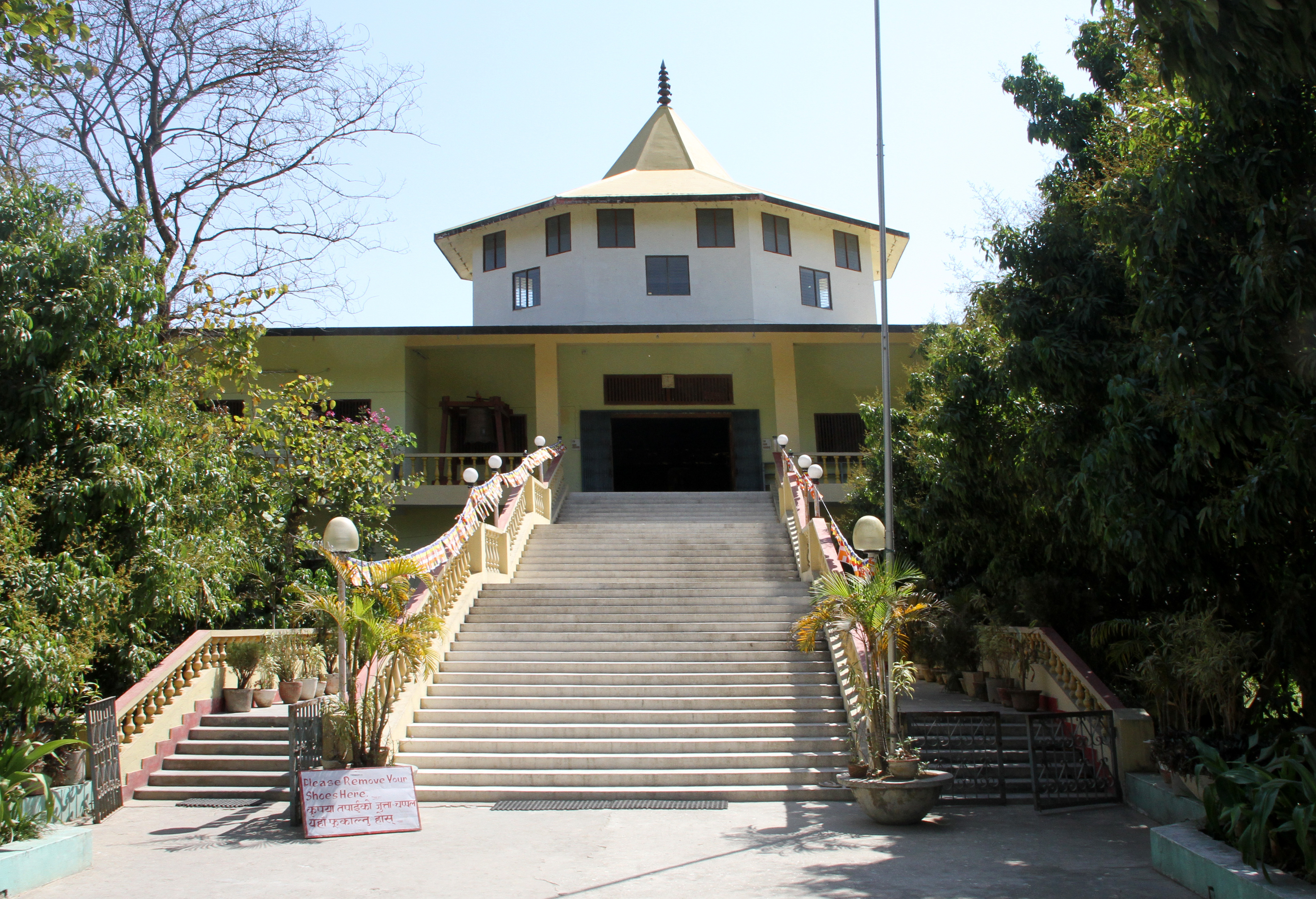
Indian Buddhist Temple in Lumbini, Nepal

=== 1990s ===
The special security relationship between New Delhi and Kathmandu was re-established during the June 1990 New Delhi meeting of Nepal's prime minister Krishna Prasad Bhattarai and Indian prime minister V.P. Singh, after India ended its 13-month-long economic blockade of Nepal. During the December 1991 visit to India by Nepalese prime minister Girija Prasad Koirala, the two countries signed new, separate trade and transit treaties and other economic agreements designed to accord Nepal additional economic benefits.

Indian-Nepali relations appeared to be undergoing still more reassessment when Nepal's prime minister Man Mohan Adhikary visited New Delhi in April 1995 and insisted on a major review of the 1950 peace and friendship treaty which Nepal believed was enabling an ongoing demographic shift in Nepal's Terai region. In the face of benign statements by his Indian hosts relating to the treaty, Adhikary sought greater economic independence for his landlocked nation while simultaneously striving to improve ties with China.

In June 1990, a joint Kathmandu-New Delhi communique was issued pending the finalisation of a comprehensive arrangement covering all aspects of bilateral relations, restoring trade relations, reopening transit routes for Nepal's imports, and formalising respect of each other's security concerns.

The communiqué announced the restoration of the status quo ante along with the reopening of all border points. Nepal agreed to various concessions regarding India's commercial privileges. Kathmandu announced that it factored in the lower cost while purchasing arms and personnel carriers from China. Nepal was advising China to withhold delivery of the last shipment. As per the declaration made by the communiqué, both countries would cooperate in the industrial development and waters coming from their common rivers would be harnessed for mutual benefit for both the countries, while also protecting and managing the environment.

=== 2000s ===
In 2005, after King Gyanendra took over, Nepalese relations with India soured. However, even after the restoration of democracy, in 2008, Prachanda, the Prime Minister of Nepal, visited India, in September 2008 only after visiting China, breaking the long-held tradition of Nepalese PM making India as their first port-of-call. When in India, he spoke about a new dawn, in the bilateral relations, between the two countries. He said, "I am going back to Nepal as a satisfied person. I will tell Nepali citizens back home that a new era has dawned. Time has come to effect a revolutionary change in bilateral relations. On behalf of the new government, I assure you that we are committed to make a fresh start."

In 2006, the newly formed democratic parliament of Nepal passed the controversial citizenship bill that led to distribution of Nepalese citizenship to nearly 4 million stateless immigrants in Nepal's Terai by virtue of naturalisation. While the Indian government welcomed the reformed citizenship law, certain section of Nepalese people expressed deep concerns regarding the new citizenship act and feared that the new citizenship law might be a threat to Nepalese sovereignty. The citizenship bill passed by the Nepalese parliament in 2006 was the same bill that was rejected by King Birendra in 2000 before he along with his entire family was massacred and upon which Indian government had then formally expressed sorrow.

In 2008, Indo-Nepal ties got a further boost with an agreement to resume water talks after a 4-year hiatus. The Nepalese Water Resources Secretary Shanker Prasad Koirala said the Nepal-India Joint Committee on Water Resources meet decided to start the reconstruction of the breached Koshi embankment after the water level went down. During the Nepal Prime Minister's visit to New Delhi in September, the Prime Ministers of both the countries expressed satisfaction at the age-old close, cordial and extensive relationships between their states and expressed their support and co-operation to further consolidate the relationship.

The two issued a 22-point statement highlighting the need to review, adjust and update the 1950 Treaty of Peace and Friendship, amongst other agreements. India would also provide a credit line of up to $15 million to Nepal to ensure uninterrupted supplies of petroleum products, as well as lift bans on the export of rice, wheat, maize, sugar and sucrose for quantities agreed to with Nepal. India would also provide $2 million as immediate flood relief. In return, Nepal will take measures for the promotion of investor friendly, enabling business environment to encourage Indian investments in Nepal.

=== 2010s ===
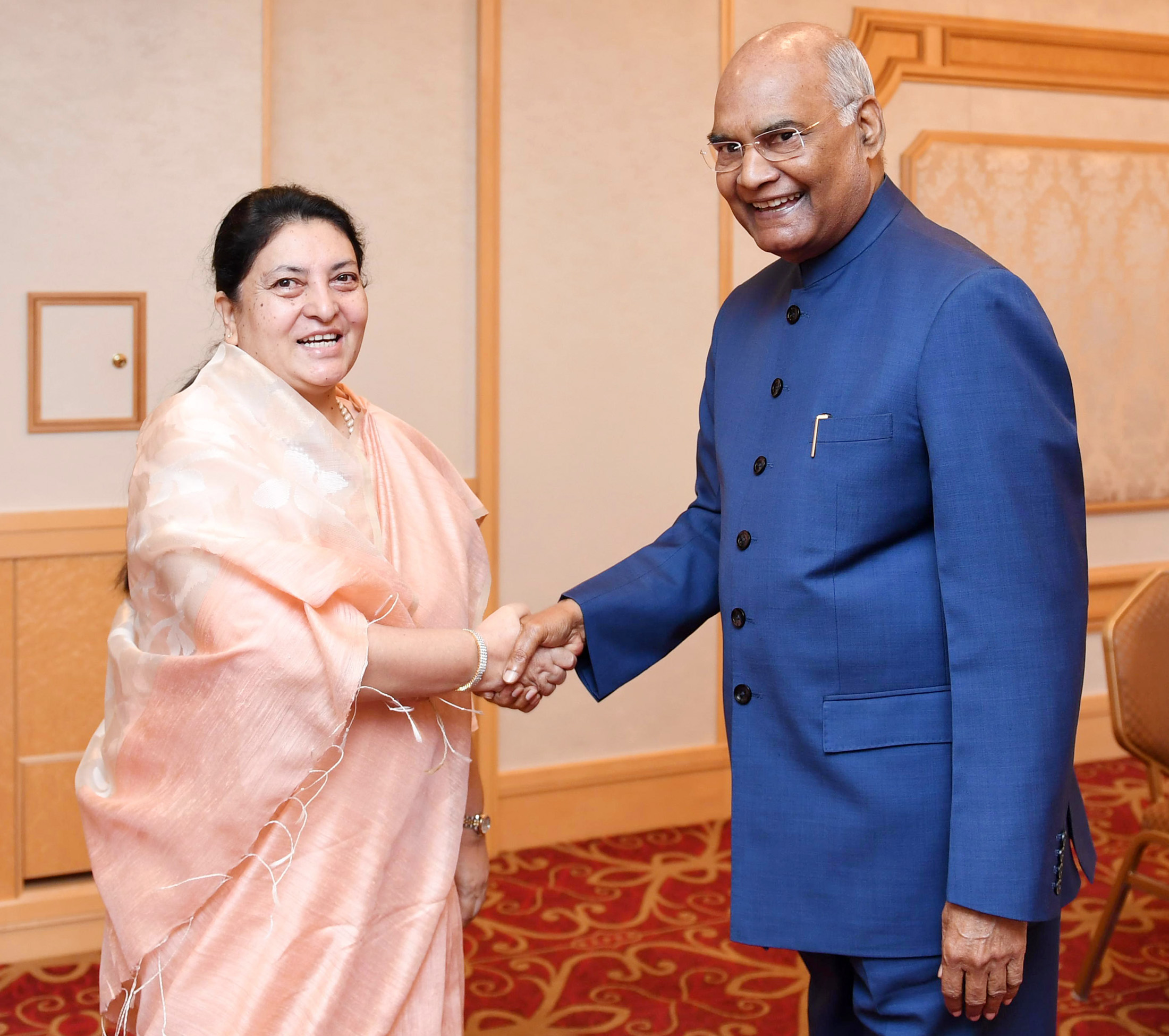
Indian President Ram Nath Kovind met with Nepalese President Bidya Devi Bhandari in Tokyo, 2019

In 2010, India extended a line of credit worth US$50 million and 80,000 tonnes of food grains. Furthermore, a three-tier mechanism at the level of ministerial, secretary and technical levels will be built to push forward discussions on the development of water resources between the two sides. Politically, India acknowledged a willingness to promote efforts towards peace in Nepal. Indian External affairs minister Pranab Mukherjee promised the Nepali Prime Minister Prachanda that he would "extend all possible help for peace and development." In 2014, the Indian embassy in Kathmandu started an open house service which would hear grievances faced by the Indian nationals living in Nepal.

However, in recent years, the increasing dominance of Maoism in Nepal's domestic politics, along with the strengthening economic and political influence of the People's Republic of China has caused the Nepalese government to gradually distance its ties with India, though Nepal still does support India at the UN. Prime Minister of India Narendra Modi visited Nepal in August 2014, marking the first official visit by an Indian prime minister in 17 years. During his visit, the Indian government agreed to provide Nepal with US$1 billion as concessional line of credit for various development purposes and a HIT formula, but he insisted that Indian immigrants in Nepal do not pose a threat to Nepal's sovereignty and therefore open border between Nepal and India should be a bridge and not a barrier. Nepal and India signed an agreement on 25 November 2014 as per which India will build a 900 MW hydropower plant at a cost of another US$1 billion. An amount of US$250 million has been granted to Nepal as a part of the agreements signed on 22 February 2016 for post-earthquake reconstruction.

A perpetual issue for many people of Nepali origin, the birthplace of Gautama Buddha has long been a cultural and social issue devoid from the political landscape of both Nepal and India. However, since the souring of relations between the two countries, the issue has been used to undermine relations between the two countries both politically and socially. The two-day-long International Buddhist conference in Kathmandu which ran from 19 to 20 May 2016 marked Vesak and the 2,560th birthday of the Buddha was also used to promote the Buddha's birthplace which lies in modern-day Nepal. The decision of the Nepal Culture Ministry to change the theme, "Preservation and Development of Buddhist Heritage of Nepal" with the sub-theme "Lumbini – Birthplace of Buddha" under the name "Lumbini – Fountainhead of Buddhism" was met with criticism from India which subsequently boycotted the conference due to this and on the back of China's supposed monetary involvement in the conference. Nepali Prime Minister, K.P. Oli told the media that the conference, "should help us make clear to the world that Buddha was born in Nepal and that Buddhist philosophy is the product of Nepal".

In early March 2017, the fatal shooting of a Nepali man who was protesting Indian-occupation on disputed territory between India and Nepal sparked protests in the capital Kathmandu. Indian troops had previously prevented a group of Nepalese farmers living along the border from completing a culvert in the disputed area which ultimately led to protests. It was considered rare for India to retaliate with gunfire.

=== 2020s ===
==== Balen Shah government ====
India–Nepal relations have fluctuated under Prime Minister Balen Shah. Shah, a staunch Nepali nationalist, reignited border disputes with India, claiming that both countries encroached on the other's territory. Shah had previously displaced a map of Greater Nepal in his office as a response to an Akhand Bharat map in the Indian parliament.

== Treaty ==
The 1950 treaty and letters exchanged between the then Indian government and Rana rulers of Nepal, stated that "neither government shall tolerate any threat to the security of the other by a foreign aggressor" and obligated both sides "to inform each other of any serious friction or misunderstanding with any neighboring state likely to cause any breach in the friendly relations subsisting between the two governments." These accords cemented a "special relationship" between India and Nepal. The treaty also granted citizens of Nepal, the same economic and educational opportunities as Indian citizens in India, while accounting for preferential treatment to Indian citizens and businesses compared to other nationalities in Nepal. The Indo-Nepal border is open; Nepalese and Indian nationals may move freely across the border without passports or visas and may live and work in either country. However, Indians are not allowed to own land-properties or work in government institutions in Nepal, while Nepalese nationals in India are allowed to work in some Indian government institutions (except in some states and some civil services (the IFS, IAS, and IPS)) notably the Indian military. The Election commission of Nepal has published a figure of 562,456 Nepali citizens in India as of 2021, eligible to vote in the upcoming Federal elections of 2022 in Nepal. The number of Indian immigrants in Nepal who haven't registered their paperwork with the Indian embassy in Kathmandu isn't known as of 2021, while Indian embassy in Kathmandu published a figured of 600,000 Indian citizens as currently residing in Nepal.

After years of dissatisfaction by the Nepalese government, India in 2014, agreed to revise and adjust the 1950 Indo-Nepal Treaty of Peace and Friendship to reflect the current realities. However, the modality of adjustment hasn't been made clear by either side. The Nepali side is reported to have submitted an EPG report to the PM of Nepal while the Indian foreign ministry hasn't made any announcements in regards to the submission of the same EPG report to the Indian PM.

== Infrastructural and financial support ==
Since the early 1950s, India has made a considerable contribution to Nepal's socioeconomic development. Along with crucial social sector areas like health, education, and human resource development, other areas of relations include infrastructure like airports, irrigation, agriculture, roads, bridges, power projects, industrial estates, communication, surveys, forestry, and building construction.

In 1951, Nepal and India began working together to build a modern infrastructure, and as Nepal's major development partner, India built Kathmandu's Gauchar Airport, also known as Tribhuvan International Airport which was completed in 1954. In the same year the Indian Aid Mission in Nepal was also set up for developing projects in a number of areas including health, connectivity, education, power, and government departments. In 1976, India assisted Nepal in the construction of the 21 MW Trishuli Hydropower Station with a grant of Rs 140 million. In 2014, the Nepal Bharat Maitri Emergency & Trauma Centre in Kathmandu at a cost of Rs 100 crore, and a new college block of B.P. Koirala Institute of Health Sciences, Dharan at a cost of Rs 125 crore were inaugurated. In 2019, the Motihari-Amlekhgunj Petroleum Pipeline was installed at a cost of Rs 324 crore.

After the April 2015 Nepal earthquake, the Government of India committed US$1 billion for post-earthquake reconstruction projects in Nepal. The reconstruction of 50,000 houses at a cost of US$100 million was completed in November 2021. Other projects include construction of 132 health facilities across 10 districts and the reconstruction of 71 educational institutes in 8 districts. Also, 28 cultural heritage projects in 7 districts are in the process of being restored.

During the coronavirus crisis, India sent 10 lakh (1 million) doses of vaccines to Nepal as a grant within a week of the roll-out in India. Under India's Vaccine Maitri initiative, it provided nearly 95 lakh (9.5 million) doses of vaccines to Nepal after the-then PM of Nepal, for reasons unexplained, decided not to use Covid-19 vaccines from China.

== Military ties ==
Nepal and India have long-standing military ties and since 1950 have a custom of awarding the honorary rank of General to each other's Army Chiefs. India has been giving training and equipment to aid the Nepali Army (NA) in modernising. Other facets of India's defence cooperation with Nepal include assistance during disasters, joint military exercises, adventure activities, and bilateral visits. Indian army played a critical role in ethnic cleansing of Nepali-speakers from Bhutan. Many Nepal Army personnel attend training courses at various Indian Army training facilities. The Indian Army's Gorkha battalions used to be raised in part through recruiting in the Nepalese hill districts historically, however, not a single Nepali citizen has been recruited into the Indian Army's Gorkha battalions since 2019. Presently, the Indian Army is believed to employ roughly 32,000 Gorkha soldiers from Nepal.

=== Joint military exercises ===
India and Nepal engage in an annual joint exercise called "Surya Kiran" with the latest edition being Exercise Surya Kiran XVIII. The 18th annual exercise was held between December 2024 and January 2025. Nepal's ambassador Madhu Raman Acharya stressed the importance of intelligence sharing and joint border patrolling between India and Nepal, affirming Nepal’s support for India’s counter-terrorism efforts.

== Border disputes ==
The territorial disputes of India and Nepal include Kalapani 400 km^{2} at India-Nepal-China tri-junction in Western Nepal and Susta 140 km^{2} in Southern Nepal. Nepal claims that the river to the west of Kalapani is the main Kali river; hence the area should belong to Nepal. But India claims that the river to the west of Kalapani is not the main Kali river, and owing to this new Indian claim, Indian government led by Narendra Modi, for the first time removed the full delineation of Kali river from official Indian map in the newly released map of India in 2018. The river borders the Nepalese province of Sudurpashchim and the Indian state of Uttarakhand. The Sugauli Treaty signed by Nepal and British India on 4 March 1816 locates the Kali River as Nepal's western boundary with India. Subsequent maps drawn by British surveyors show the source of the boundary river at different places. This discrepancy in locating the source of the river led to boundary disputes between India and Nepal, with each country producing maps supporting their own claims. The Kali River runs through an area that includes a disputed area of about 400 km^{2} around the source of the river although the exact size of the disputed area varies from source to source. The dispute intensified in 1997 as the Nepali parliament considered a treaty on hydro-electric development of the river. India and Nepal differ as to which stream constitutes the source of the river. Nepal has reportedly tabled an 1856 map from the British India Office to support its position. Kalapani has been controlled by India's Indo-Tibetan border security forces since the Sino-Indian War with China in 1962. In 2015, the Nepalese parliament objected an agreement between India and China to trade through Lipulekh Pass, a mountainous pass in the disputed Kalapani area, stating that the agreement between India and China to trade through Kalapani violates Nepal's sovereign rights over the territory. Nepal has called for the withdrawal of the Indian border forces from Kalapani area.

As the first step for demarcating Indo-Nepal border, survey teams from both countries located and identified missing pillars along the border, and, an agreement was reached to construct new pillars in some places. India and Nepal share more than 1,770-kilometer border. According to the Nepalese government estimates, of the 8000 boundary pillars along the border, 1,240 pillars are missing, 2,500 require restoration, and, 400 more need to be constructed. The survey teams conducted survey of the border pillars based on the strip maps prepared by the Joint Technical Level Nepal-India Boundary Committee (JTLNIBC). The JTLNIBC was set up in 1981 to demarcate the India-Nepal border and after years of surveying, deliberations and extensions, the committee had delineated 98 per cent of the India-Nepal boundary, excluding Kalapani and Susta, on 182 strip maps which was finally submitted in 2007 for ratification by both the countries. Unfortunately neither country ratified the maps. Nepal maintained that it cannot ratify the maps without the resolution of outstanding boundary disputes, i.e. Kalapani and Susta. India, on the other hand, awaited Nepal's ratification while at the same time urging it to endorse the maps as a confidence building measure for solving the Kalapani and Susta disputes. In absence of a ratification, the process of completely demarcating the India-Nepal boundary could not be undertaken and completed.

In 2020, the relation between the two countries came under strain after the inauguration of an 80 km long road which connected the Lipulekh pass with Dharchula in Uttarakhand. The strategically crucial road was inaugurated by India's Defence Minister, Rajnath Singh on 8 May 2020. Nepal reacted to this inauguration and claimed that the road passed through Nepalese territory. India later rejected Nepal's claim and stated that the road was within the Indian territory.

== Border crossings ==
Integrated check posts with immigration and customs facilities are:

- Jogbani, Bihar
- Bhitthamore, Bihar
- Sonauli, Uttar Pradesh
- Rupaidiha, Uttar Pradesh
- Taulihawa-Siddharthnagar (only for India and Nepalese citizens)
- Jathi, Bihar
- Laukaha in Bihar - Thadi Nepal.

In 2014, to enhance the collaborative relations between the two nations, Nepal and India started a Trans-border bus service from New Delhi to Kathmandu connecting the nation's capital of both countries. The direct bus service with multiple routes improves connectivity between the capitals of both countries. The service is in operation by Delhi Bus Corporation (DTC), India and several other private Travel companies. At present (2019), Kathmandu to Delhi bus service, Kathmandu to Siliguri Bus service, Kathmandu to Varanasi, Delhi to Janakpur bus service are in operation.

According to an official statement issued by the Ministry of Railways, from February 2023, Indian Railways will run its Bharat Gaurav Tourist Train on a route which will connect pilgrimage sites of Ayodhya in India and Janakpur in Nepal. The train service will connect the two most significant pilgrimage sites of both the nations. This initiative aims at strengthening the bilateral ties between the two countries while also boosting religious tourism.

== Cultural relations ==
=== Maithili language and culture ===
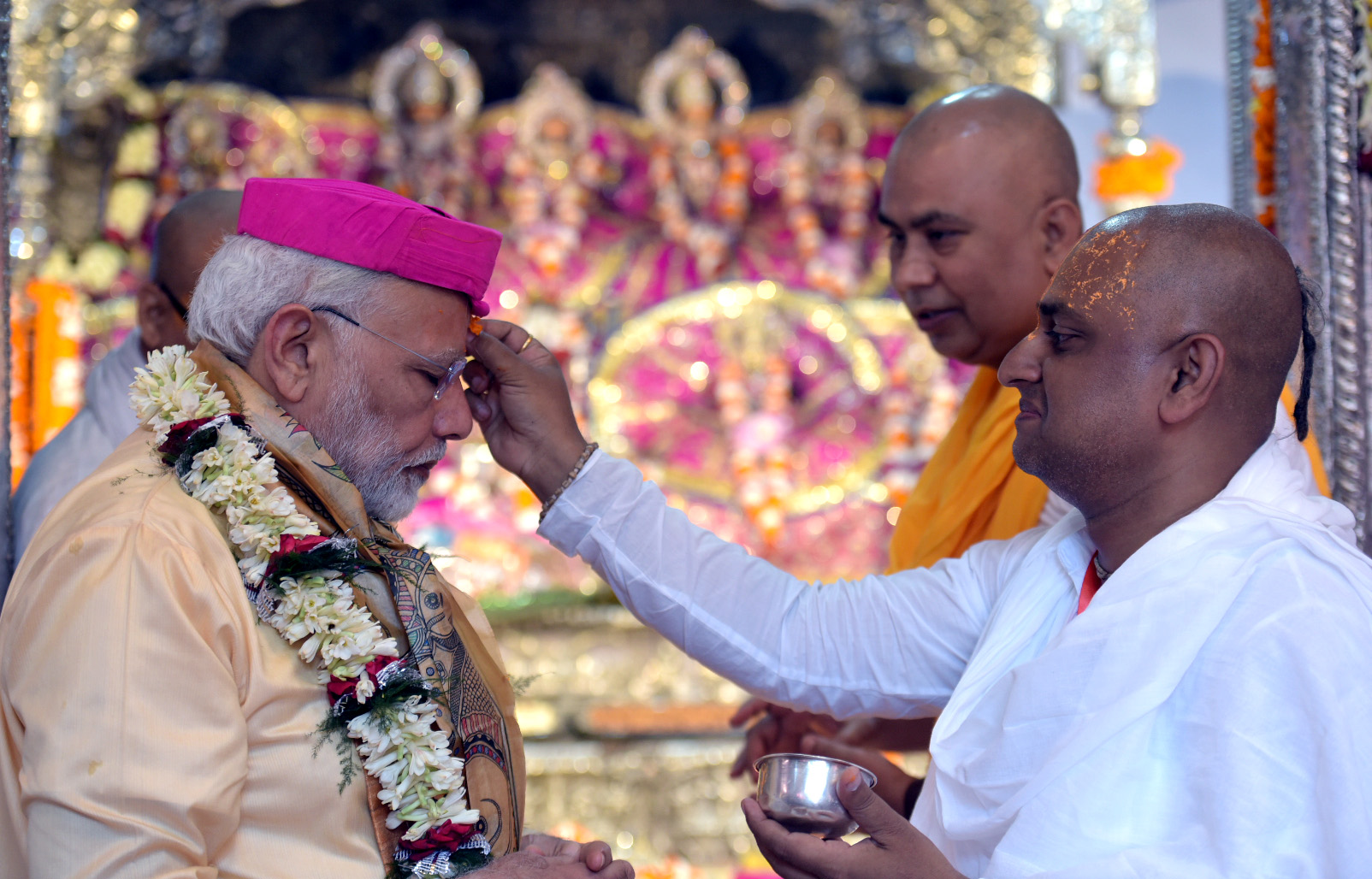
Indian Prime Minister Narendra Modi wearing a Mithila Paag and offering prayers at Janaki Mandir, Janakpur, Nepal (11 May 2018).

Maithili is an Indo-Aryan language spoken in both India and Nepal, primarily across the Mithila region of northern Bihar, eastern Jharkhand, and the Terai areas of Nepal, including Madhesh and Koshi Provinces. Because of this shared linguistic and cultural heritage, Maithili serves as an important link in India–Nepal cultural relations.

Maithili-speaking communities on both sides of the border share common traditions, literature, and festivals. Major celebrations such as Chhath, Sama Chakeva, and Jur Sital (Maithili New Year) are observed with similar customs in both countries.

Cross-border literary and cultural events—such as Maithili poetry festivals and folk music programs held in Janakpur and Darbhanga—highlight these enduring ties.

The traditional Tirhuta script, historical in both countries, and the broader heritage of the Mithila region—which extends across parts of Bihar, Jharkhand, and southeastern Nepal—continue to symbolize the deep-rooted cultural continuum linking the peoples of India and Nepal.

=== Sports ===
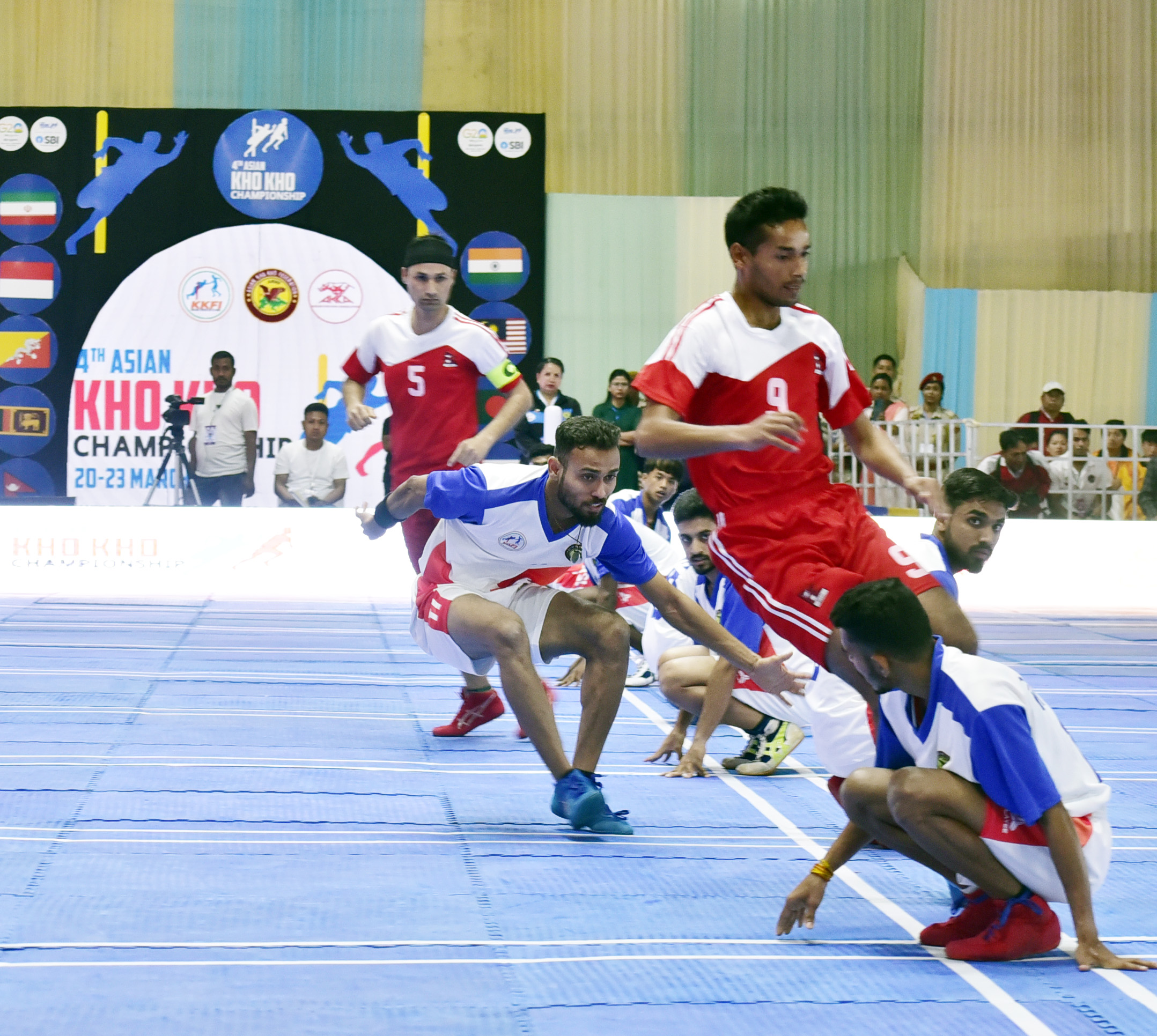
India vs Nepal at the 2023 Asian Kho Kho Championship

India and Nepal play many of the same traditional South Asian games. India beat Nepal in the finals of the inaugural 2025 Kho Kho World Cup.

== Trade ==
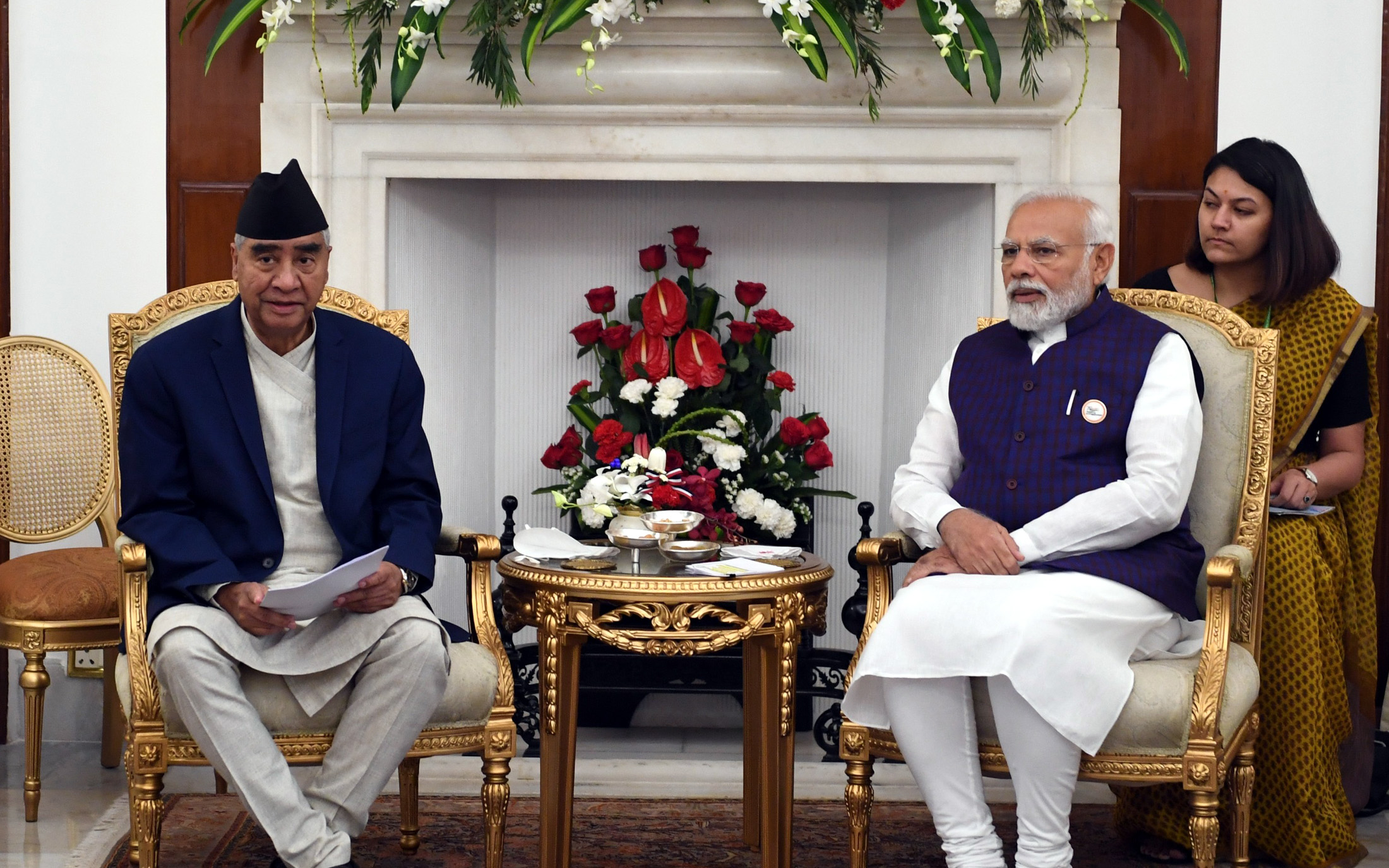
PM Modi meeting the PM of Nepal, Mr. Sher Bahadur Deuba, at Hyderabad House, in New Delhi on 2 April 2022.

India is Nepal's largest trade partner and the largest source of total foreign investments (China has been the largest source of FDI in Nepal from 2015 onward), besides providing transit for almost entire third country trade of Nepal in accordance with Indo-Nepal Transit treaty. India accounts for over two-thirds of Nepal's merchandise trade, about one-third of trade in services, one-third of foreign direct investments, almost 100% of petroleum supplies, and a significant share of inward remittances on account of pensioners, professionals and workers working in India, with nearly $1.2 billion per year remitted by Nepalese citizens in India back to Nepal. India accounts for 30% FDI into Nepal, which makes it one of the primary investors for Nepal.

Nepal is the 9th largest trading partner of India. Nepal is also the 7th largest source of remittance to India, with $3.2 billion a year remitted from Nepal to India per the World Bank.

In the year 2017–2018, Nepal's total trade with India was about US$8.2 billion; Nepal's exports to India were US$446.5 million; while imports from India were upwards of US$7.7 billion. In percentage terms, Nepal's trade deficit with India is approximately 1724%.

Nepal's main imports from India are petroleum products (28.6%), motor vehicles and spare parts (7.8%), M. S. billet (7%), medicines (3.7%), other machinery and spares (3.4%), coldrolled sheet in coil (3.1%), electrical equipment (2.7%), hotrolled sheet in coil (2%), M. S. wires, rods, coils and bars (1.9%), cement (1.5%), agriculture equipment and parts (1.2%), chemical fertilizer (1.1%), chemicals (1.1%) and thread (1%). Nepal's export basket to India mainly comprises jute goods (9.2%), zinc sheet (8.9%), textiles (8.6%), threads (7.7%), polyester yarn (6%), juice (5.4%), catechue (4.4%), Cardamom (4.4%), wire (3.7%), tooth paste (2.2%) and M. S. Pipe (2.1%).

Based on the high quantity of petroleum import from India, the countries are in talks for setting up new additional pipelines.

In 2020, Nepal incurred the highest trade deficit with India amounting to US$6.1 billion.

In 2022, Nepal exported electricity worth Rs10.38 billion to India till mid-November 2022. In the recent years, electricity is one of Nepal's largest exports to India. In November 2021, India allowed Nepal for the first time to sell electricity in the Indian market through a bidding process. Nepal has been authorized to sell over 400MW of electricity to India.

On 14 September 2026, India approved electricity exports of up to 654 MW to Nepal for 18 hours daily until 31 December 2026, following flood damage to Nepal's hydropower infrastructure. The amount permitted from January onward was to be reviewed in December.

== Human trafficking ==
Human trafficking in Nepal is a serious concern. An estimated 100,000–200,000 Nepalese in India are believed to have been trafficked. Sex trafficking is particularly rampant within Nepal and to India, with as many as 5,000–10,000 women and girls trafficked to India alone each year. The seriousness of trafficking of Nepalese girls to India was highlighted by CNN Freedom Project's documentary: Nepal's Stolen Children. Maiti Nepal has rescued more than 12,000 stolen Nepalese children from sex trafficking since 1993.

== 2015 Madhesi crisis and Nepal blockade ==
In 2015, Nepal promulgated its new Constitution but the Madheshis, some Janajatis and some Tharus, felt they were marginalized and being left out in the new constitution. These groups, the Madheshis in particular, then organized small scale protests and blockaded a portion of border India-Nepal border near Biratnagar area in September 2015, shortly after the devastating earthquake which had mainly affected people of Hilly regions of Nepal.

The Nepalese government accused India of deliberately blockading the entirety of the border by not allowing vehicles to pass from checkpoints where no protests were held (like borders along Sikkim, Gorkhaland, Uttarakhand, and Uttar Pradesh) questioning how the blockade of the long border was even possible given the strong kingship between Hill Nepalese people, Gorkhas of Gorkhaland, and Nepali-speaking citizens of Sikkim. Indian government, however, denied all allegations of any involvement in the blockade and also warned Nepal not to play with the emotions of Nepali-speaking Sikkimese, and not to call Sikkimese people 'oppressed people'.

== See also ==
- Nepali Indians
- Nepalese people of Indian ancestry
- Nepal's relations with Northeast India
- Foreign relations of Nepal
- Foreign relations of India
- Territorial disputes of India and Nepal
- India-Nepal border
- Indo-Nepal Border Road
- South Asian Association for Regional Cooperation (SAARC)
- Nepal Bharat Library
- Roti-Beti Ka Rishta
- Treaty of Trade and Transit of 1960 between India and Nepal
