= Rupmati =

Rupmati may refer to:

- Roopmati, a medieval Indian queen (rani) and poet
- Rupamati, 1934 Nepali novel by Rudra Raj Pande

== See also ==
- Rani Rupamati's Mosque, in Ahmedabad, Gujarat, India
- Rupavati, rāga in Carnatic music
