= Nepal Bharat Library =

Library in Kathmandu, Nepal

- नेपाल भारत पुस्तकालय
- 27.7024°N 85.31112°E
- Location: Newroad, Kathmandu, Nepal
- Established: 1951

Collection
- Size: 68,000

Other information
- Parent organization: Embassy of India, Kathmandu
- Website: www.indembkathmandu.gov.in/page/about-nepal-bharat-library/

Nepal Bharat Library or more generally called the Indian Library is run by the Indian Embassy in Kathmandu, Nepal. It was called Nepal-Bharat Sanskritik Kendra until 2005. The library was established in 1951 after India set up diplomatic relations with Nepal (13 June 1947) with an aim to enhance and strengthen cultural relations and information exchange between India and Nepal. It is the first foreign library in Nepal. Initially, the library was located in Basantapur, but in 1970, it was relocated to New Road.

In the 1980s the average visitors were 1,150 per day. The number of visitors had reduced to about 300 per day in 2020.

== Facilities ==
- The library has a floor area of 3,474 sq. ft.
- As per the statistics of 1980s, there are approximately 46,000 books. The books are mostly written in Devanagari scripts. As of 2023, the book collection is 68,000.
- Book lending is available through membership cards for 14 days.
- Audio-visual facility

== Opening hours ==
The library is open five days a week, Sunday to Thursday; 10:00 to 17:00 for public access.

== See also ==
- Nepal National Library
- National Braille Library
- List of libraries in Nepal
