= Kaiser library =

Kaiser Library
- केशर पुस्तकालय
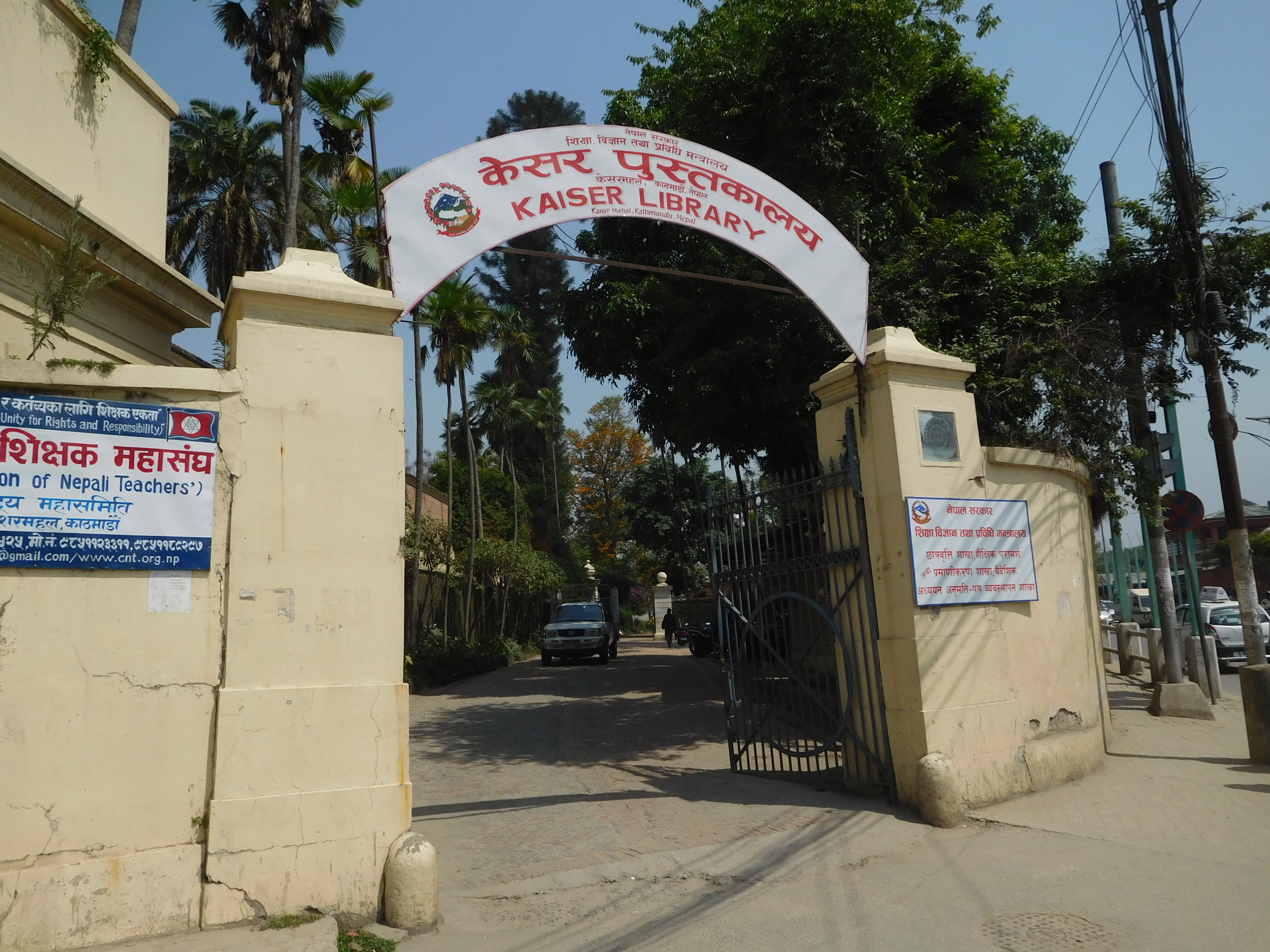
- 27.714°N 85.315°E
- Location: Kantipath, Kathmandu, Nepal
- Established: 1907

Collection
- Size: about 50,000

Other information
- Website: www.klib.gov.np

The Kaiser Library is a government-run public library in Kathmandu, Nepal. It is located in the Keshar Mahal palace complex. The library was established in 1907 by the then Prime Minister of Nepal, Chandra Shumsher Jang Bahadur Rana for his son, Kaiser (Keshar) Shumsher Rana. The library hosts some rare and ancient books on Buddhism, Tantrism and astrology. Some are written on palm-leaf manuscript. The books include a 1,100-year-old copy of the Sushruta Samhita, an ancient Sanskrit text on medicine listed in UNESCO's international Memory of the World Register. This manuscript is now the subject of an international research project.

Beside books, the library also has paintings and other antique artifacts.

== History ==
Chandra Shumsher Rana was motivated to build the library for his son after his visit to England in 1963BS (roughly 1906 AD). Kaiser was also interested in collecting books, antiques, animal trophies, paintings and photographs. During Kaiser's lifetime, the library was accessible only to his family members and notable figures. The library was handed over to the Nepal government in 2026BS after the death of Keshar Sumsher. The library has over 50,000 books half of which were donated by Kaiser's wife after his death in 1965. The library was made public on 11 September 1969. The library is open throughout the week, including government holidays.

== Sections ==
The library is divided into six sections as follows:

- Kaiser Collections (old books, special collection, manuscript collection, maps, and old photos)
- New Collections (English and Nepali language)
- Children and UNESCO
- Periodicals Collections
- Administration and accounting
- Technical section

== Notable users ==
- Jawaharlal Nehru, Indian prime-minister
- Perceval Landon, orientalist
- Sylvain Levi, orientalist

== Earthquake damage ==
The April 2015 Nepal earthquake damaged about 9000 books in the library.

== See also ==
- Nepal National Library
- National Braille Library
- List of libraries in Nepal
