= Rudra Raj Pande =

Nepali educator and writer (1901–1987)

Sardar Rudra Raj Pande
- रुद्रराज पाण्डे
- Born: 10 March 1901; Pyukha Tole, Kathmandu, Nepal
- Died: 6 April 1987 (aged 86); Kedar Ghat, Varanasi, India
- Education: Masters in Arts
- Occupations: Educator, historian, novelist
- Notable work: Rupamati
- Spouse: Chet Kumari
- Children: 5
- Parents: Padma Raj Pande (father); Tika Laxmi Devi (mother)
- Website: Sardar Rudra Raj Pande

Sardar Rudra Raj Pande (1901–1987) was a Nepali educator, writer and historian. He served as the Headmaster of Durbar High School from 1925 to 1938, the Headmaster of Tri-Chandra College from 1938 to 1951 and the Vice Chancellor of Tribhuvan University from 1964 to 1969. He wrote multiple novels including Rupamati, which is considered as one of the earliest novels written in Nepali language. He also played an active role in establishing SLC examination board and Department of Archaeology.

== Early life and education ==
He was born on 10 March 1901 (26 Falgun 1957 BS) in Pyukha Tole, Kathmandu to father Padma Raj Pande and mother Tika Laxmi Devi. His ancestral family served as royal preceptors to the Sen dynasty of Tanahu and Palpa and Shah dynasty of Gorakha. His grandmother left the village of Lamjung and moved to Kathmandu and settled there.

Initially, he was homeschooled and then transferred to Ranipokhari Sanskrit Pathshala. He was then transferred to Durbar High School for English-medium education. He passed his matriculation from Calcutta in First Division. He then joined a university in Calcutta but later moved to Allahabad, where he received his Masters in Arts degree.

== Teaching career ==
He was appointed as Professor of history in Tri-Chandra College in 1924. In 1925, he was also appointed as the Headmaster of Durbar High School. He was the first Nepali Headmaster of the school. He shifted the matriculation affiliation of the school from Calcutta to Patna. Eventually, School Leaving Certificate board was established in Nepal affiliated to Patna University. He served as the Headmaster of Durbar High school for 13 years till 1938. He was then appointed as Headmaster of Tri-Chandra College from 1938 (1995 BS) to 1951 (2008 BS). He also played an active role in Jayatu Sanskritam movement in 1947, for the recognition Sanskrit examination in Nepal. Previously, the exam was only valid if the students appeared in exam in Varanasi.

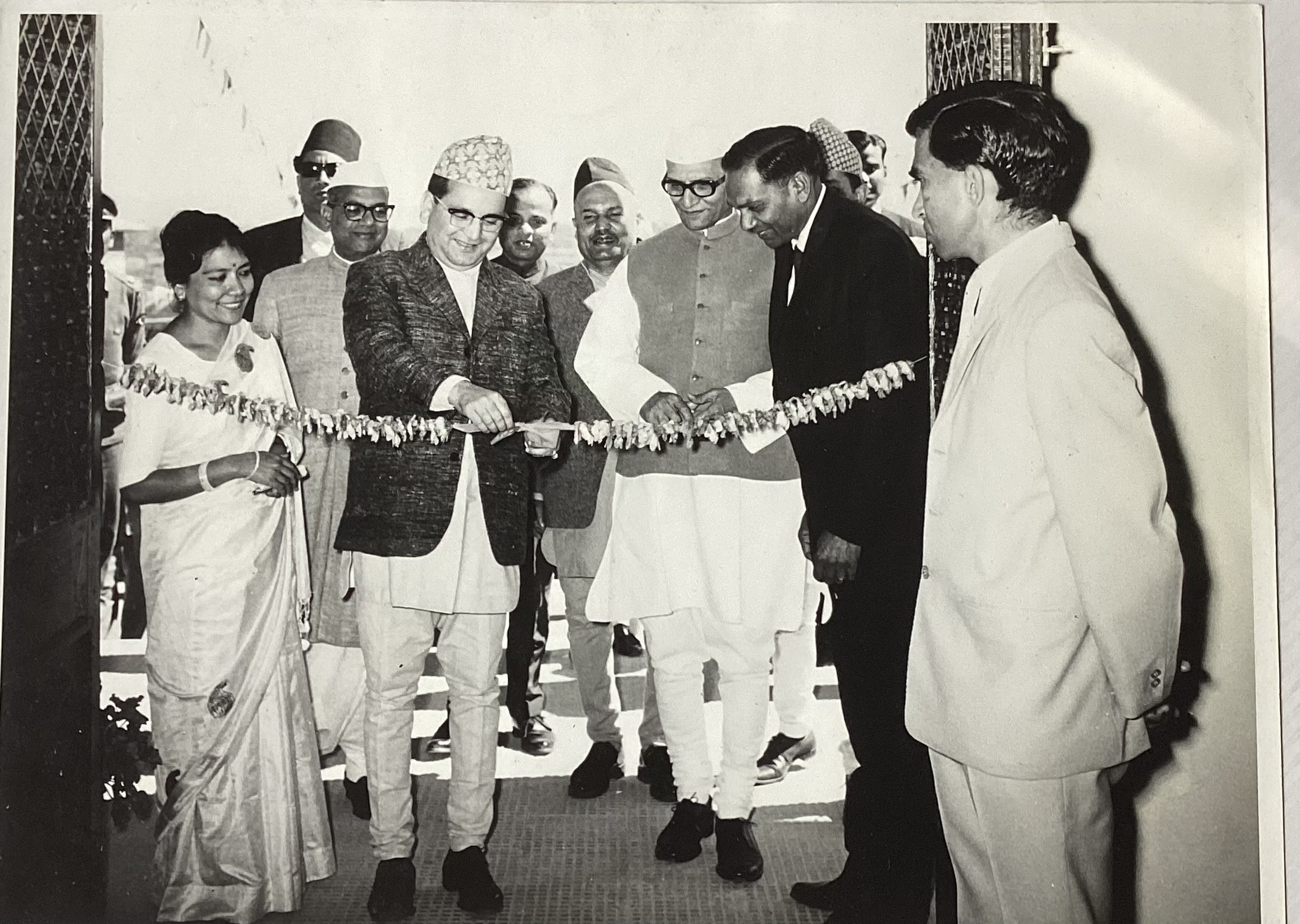
Pande (fourth from the right), at the inauguration of the TU Central Library Building at Kirtipur in the presence of the then Prime Minister Surya Bahadur Thapa and the Deputy Prime Minister of India Morarji Desai

After the end of autocratic Rana regime and the establishment of democracy in Nepal in 1950, he was appointed as the Secretary in the Ministry of Education. He established the Department of Archaeology and served as its director. Later, he was appointed as the Chairman of Nepal Education Reform Commission. In 1960, he retired from civil service and went to Varanasi but was summoned by King Mahendra. He was then appointed the Vice Chancellor of Tribhuvan University. He served one term and then resigned from the post due to his health conditions.

== Literary career ==
He started his literary career with poetry. His first poem titled Sandhya was published in Chandra magazine His poems were published in Shakti Sandhu magazine. He played a key role in setting up Nepali Bhasha Prakashini Samiti for publication text books in Nepali once the SLC Board was set up in Nepal. He published his first novel Rupamati in 1935. The novel presented a social commentary of the life in the-then Nepal. His second novel Chappakazi showed the feudal system of Nepal. He also wrote books on the history of India and England. He translated children's books such as Aesop's fables into Nepali as Ispaniti Katha. His last book Her-pher was published posthumously by Nepal Academy in 1998.

== Notable works ==
Novels

- Rupamati (1935)
- Chappakazi (1937)
- Prayaschit (1939)
- Prem (1949)
- Her-pher (1998, published posthumously)

Plays

- Hamro Gaurav
- Hamro Nepal

Children's book

- Bal Ramayana
- Bal Krishna Charitra
- Ispaniti Katha

Non-fiction

- Bharatbarsho Sankshipta Itihas – Vol. I (1933)
- Bharatbarsho Sankshipta Itihas – Vol. II (1934)
- England Itihas (1937)

== Personal life and death ==
He was married to Chet Kumari. They had 5 children (3 sons and 2 daughters). He wished to visited Varanasi during his end days when his health condition worsened. He recovered for few days, then died on 6 April 1987 in Kedar Ghat, Varanasi, India on the day of Chaite Dashain.

== Honours and legacy ==
He was awarded with the title of Sardar by Prime Minister Juddha Shumsher JBR.

Medals:

- Gorkha Dakshin Bahu Fourth Class (1933)
- Tri Shakti Patta Class III (1948)
- Shri Panch Tribuvan Silver Jubilee medal
- Shri Panch Mahendra Coronation medal
- Shri Panch Birendra Coronation medal

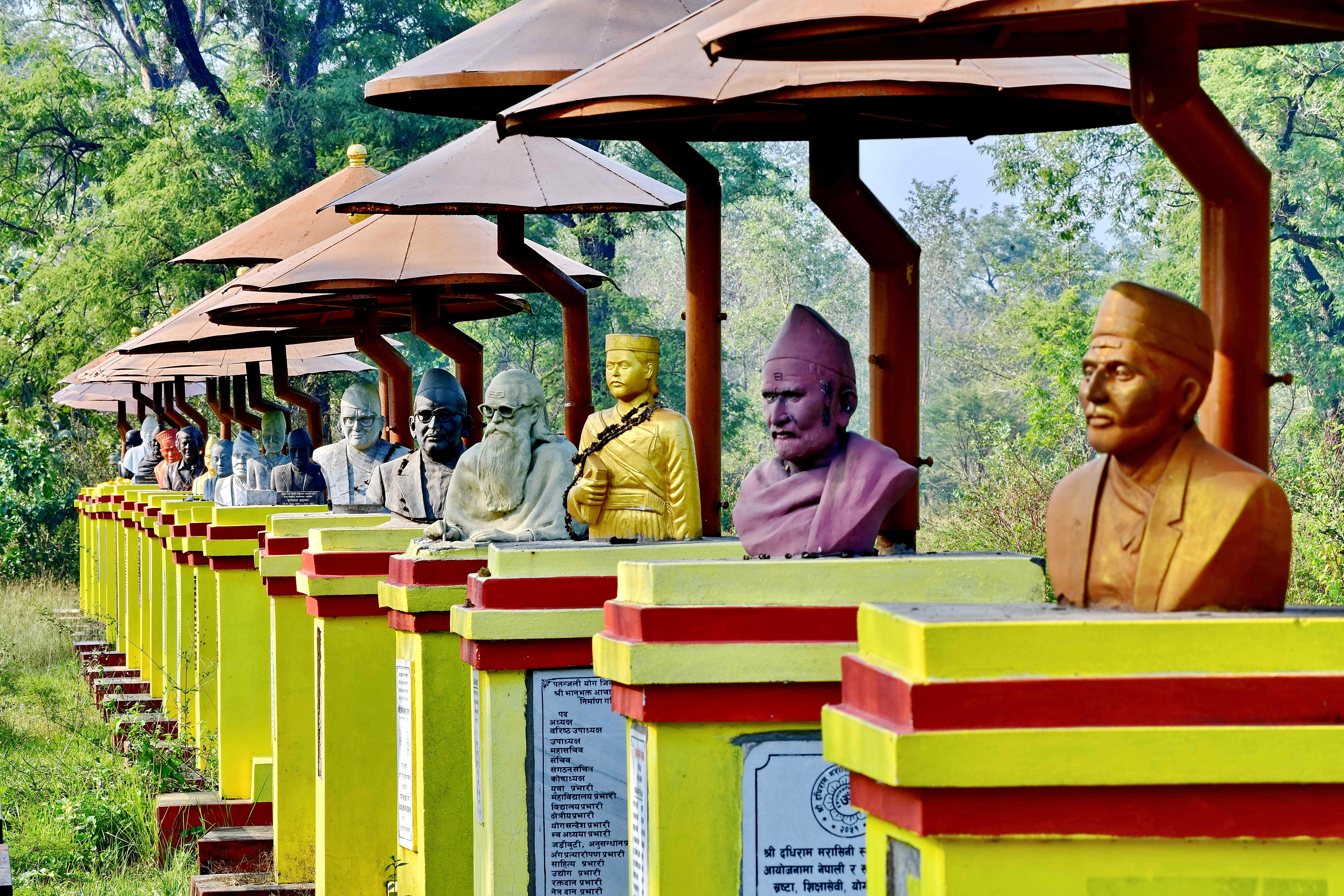
Kapildham, Kapilvastu, Lumbini Province

A bust of Pande was erected in Kapildham, Kapilvastu district for his contribution to Nepali literature. The bust is placed alongside many Nepali literary figures such as Bhanubhakta Acharya, Laxmi Prasad Devkota, etc.

== See also ==
- Girish Ballabh Joshi
- Dharanidhar Koirala
- Laxmi Prasad Devkota
