= List of libraries in Nepal =

The following is a list of libraries in Nepal.

== Libraries ==
| Name | Location(s) | Year established | Coordinates | Ref(s) |
|---|---|---|---|---|
| American Library | Kathmandu | 1952 | 27.7382207799223°N 85.33651641451048°E | |
| AWON Library | Kathmandu | – | 27.693106702379016°N 85.31806038569107°E | |
| Dynamic Public Library | Damak (headquarters), Kathmandu, Pokhara, Chitwan, Birtamode, Surunga, Shivasatakshi, Kamal, Gouradha, Biratnagar, Hetouda, Butwal, Gandagi, Arghakhachi | 2012 | | |
| Gargacharya Library | Dhankuta | | | |
| Innovation Hub Kathmandu | Kathmandu | – | 27.694279349096902°N 85.30640954419925°E | |
| Kaiser library | Kathmandu | 1907 | 27.714°N 85.315°E | |
| Kathmandu Valley Public Library | Kathmandu | 2005 | 27.6996444963724°N 85.31902301716484°E | |
| National Braille Library | Kathmandu | 2009 | – | |
| Nepal Bharat Library | Kathmandu | 1951 | 27.7024°N 85.31112°E | |
| Nepal National Library | Lalitpur | 1957 | 27.680683410514156°N 85.31345395746649°E | |
| Nepal-Japan Children Library | Kathmandu | 2001 | 27.719593757774152°N 85.31712919746437°E | |
| Sakotha Library | Bhaktapur Durbar Square | Licchavi era | – | |
| Shree Ratna Pustakalaya | Kathmandu | 1962 | 27.695685891314948°N 85.3373503541717°E | |
| Tribhuvan University Central Library | Kirtipur | 1959 | 27.6818°N 85.2829°E | |
| The Wisdom Point | Kathmandu | 2018 | 27.68921654898357°N 85.33291612807136°E | |

== See also ==
- Copyright law of Nepal
- Library associations in Nepal
- Mass media in Nepal
