= Rupamati =

1934 Nepali novel by Rudra Raj Pande

- Author: Rudra Raj Pande
- Original title: रूपमती
- Translator: Shanti Mishra
- Language: Nepali
- Genre: Fiction
- Published: 1934
- Publication place: Nepal
- Media type: Print (Paperback)
- ISBN: 9789993320357
- Followed by: Chappakazi

Rupamati is a 1934 Nepali novel by Rudra Raj Pande. It was the first widely–read novel in Nepali language. It was published in 1934 (1991 BS) and is the debut novel of the author. Even though Pande wrote 6 novels after Rupamati, it remained his most popular work. Many prominent writers such as Laxmi Prasad Devkota, Lekhnath Paudyal, Balkrishna Sama and Baburam Acharya praised the novel for its contribution to Nepali literature.

== Synopsis ==
When Pandit Chhabilal's son Habilal was nine years old, he married six-year-old Rupamati, the only daughter of Mohan Prasad Luitel. He is benevolent. Her mother-in-law Ugra Chand Chotha is miserable and temperamental and tortures Rupamati. Having learned patience and endurance from her mother, Rupamati quietly endures her mother-in-law's circus behavior in tears. The novel presented a portrait of an ideal Nepali woman.

== Translations ==
The novel has been translated into multiple languages. The novel was translated into English by Shanti Mishra in 1999. It was translated into Urdu language by Prof. Dr. Tahira Nighat Nayyar.

== See also ==
- Bir Charitra
- Mann
- Champa
