= Nepal National Library =

National library

Nepal National Library नेपाल राष्ट्रिय पुस्तकालय
- Location: Harihar Bhawan, Lalitpur, Nepal [Temporary office: Sanothimi, Bhaktapur], Nepal
- Type: Public, National library
- Established: 1957 (69 years ago)

Collection
- Size: 84,000

Other information
- Website: nnl.gov.np

The Nepal National Library (Nepali: नेपाल राष्ट्रिय पुस्तकालय) is the legal deposit and copyright library of Nepal under the Ministry of Education, Science and Technology.

== History ==
It was established on 2 January 1957 and was initially based around the purchased private collection of Rajguru Hem Raj Pandey, an advisor to King Mahendra of Nepal. Items of the Central Secretariat Library were also brought into the collection totaling 34,292 items at the time of the foundation. The library is located at Pulchowk near UNDP complex. At present the library has around 84,000 volumes of books, journals and other materials in different languages.

== See also ==
- Kaiser library
- Tribhuvan University Central Library
- List of libraries in Nepal
