= Roti-Beti Ka Rishta =

Cultural and social relations between India and Nepal

Roti-Beti ka Rishta

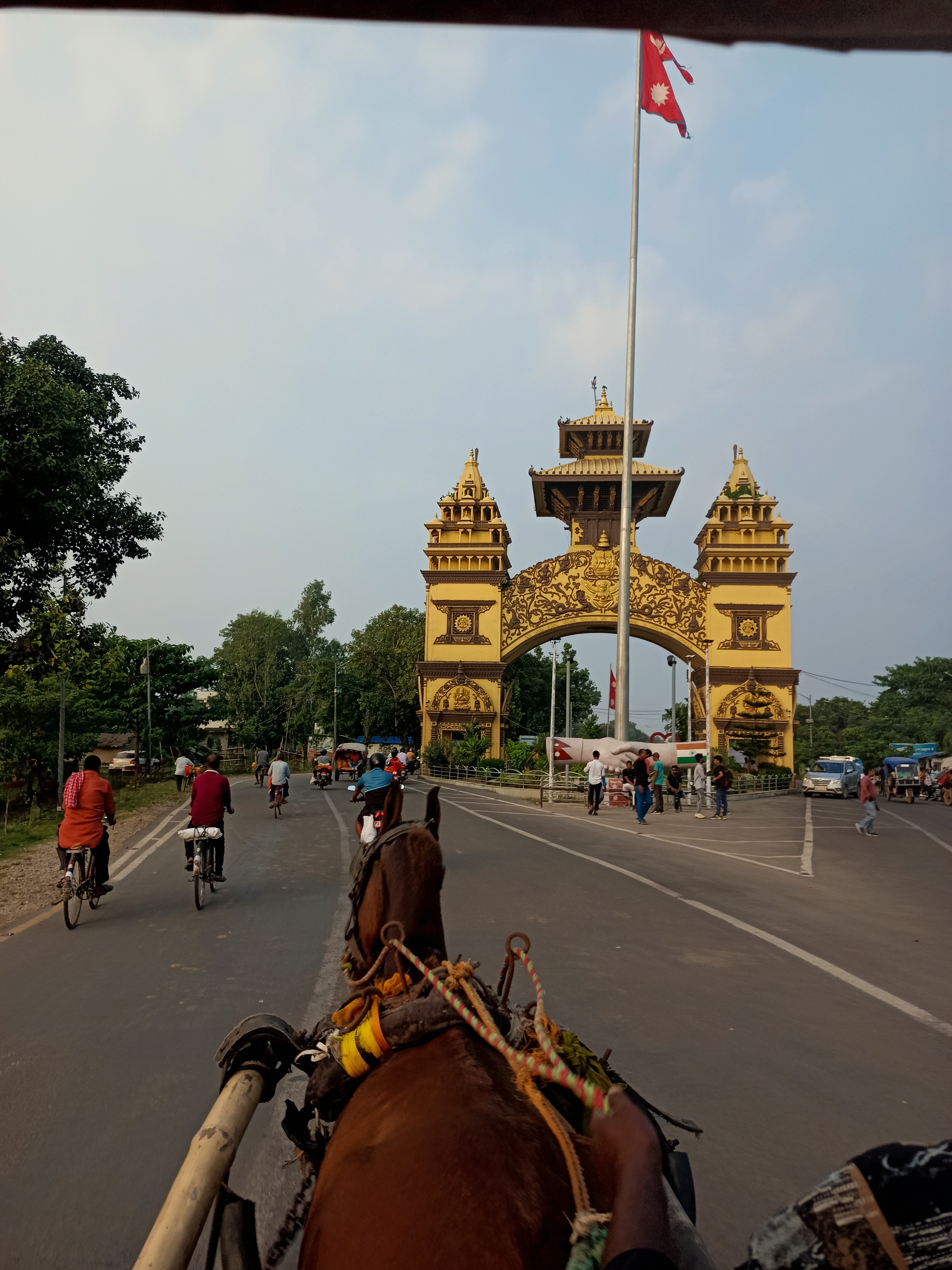
Shankaracharya Gate

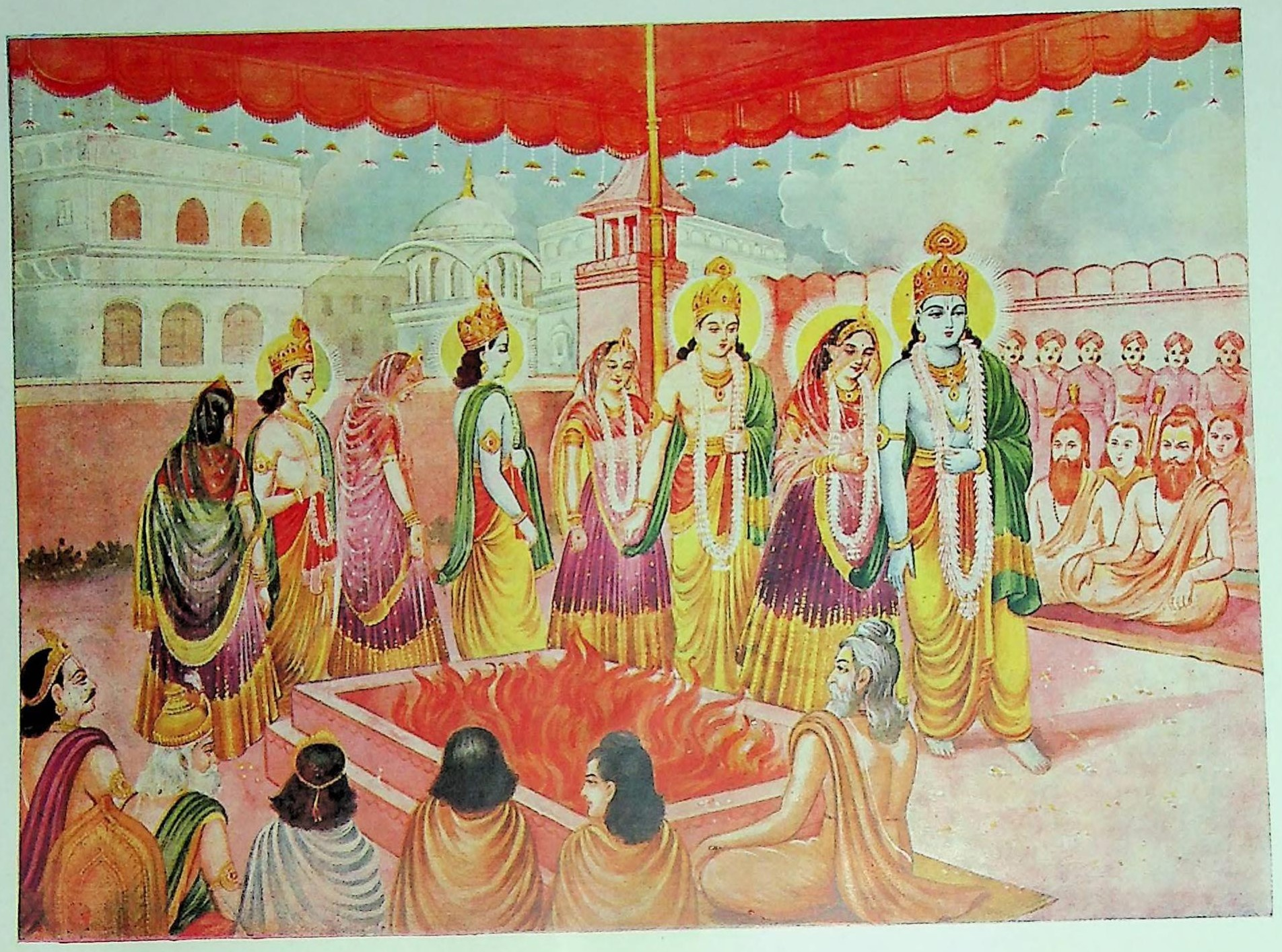
Marriage of the princes of Ayodhya with the princesses of Mithila during the Ramayana period

Bread and Daughter relationship

Roti-Beti Ka Rishta (Devanagari: रोटी-बेटी का रिश्ता) is a colloquial and culturally significant term used to describe the deep and multifaceted ties between India and Nepal. It highlights the unique and extensive interdependence of the two nations across economic, social, and cultural spheres. In essence, the "Roti-Beti" relationship implies that India and Nepal are not just neighboring countries but are bound by familial, cultural, and economic ties that are integral to the daily lives and identities of their people.

== Etymology ==
The term "Roti" means bread for food. This aspect symbolizes economic interdependence and daily livelihoods. Similarly, the term "Beti" means daughter and symbolizes marriage relation between India and Nepal. This aspect highlights the strong familial and matrimonial ties between the two nations. The literally meaning of the phrase "Roti-Beti Ka Rishta" is "relation of bread and daughter".

== Origin ==
The "Roti-Beti" relation between the two countries can be traced back to the Ramayana era. In the text Ramayana, the prince Rama of Ayodhya was married with the princess Sita of Mithila. This marital relationship between Lord Rama and Goddess Sita is considered one of the ancient origins of the "Roti-Beti" relationship between the two present nations, India and Nepal.

== Description ==
India and Nepal have cherished a relationship described as "Roti Beti Ka Rishta" since their inception. The "Roti-Beti" relationship between India and Nepal refers to the unique and deeply intertwined cultural, social, and economic bonds between the two countries. It includes trade, commerce, employment, livelihoods, cross-border marriages, shared cultural heritage and people-to-people connections, etc. The Hindi phrase "Roti-beti ka rishta" is emotionally and commonly used by the people of the two nations to signify the strong social and family ties between India and Nepal. This relationship is connected through roti (food) and daughter (marriage), symbolizing mutual cooperation, love and intimacy between the people of both countries. The Roti-Beti relationship between the two nations is still continued and maintained by the Indo-Nepal Peace and Friendship Treaty of 1950.

The Maithil Nepalese Mayor Hari Prasad Mandal of the Matihani Municipality in the Mahottari district of the Madhesh Pradesh province in Nepal states

"The no-man's land has separated our two countries, but our costumes, language, culture and festivals are the same. There is a culture of celebrating cultural festivals together, and this ghat is an example of that"

— Hari Prasad Mandal, Interview to media (24 October 2025), Bharat-Nepal Maitri Chhath Ghat near Dasgaja

Due to the unique relationship of "Roti Beti Ka Rishta" between the two nations, Nepal has a blood relationship with India. Therefore, the relation between India and Nepal is special compared to any third nation. The special relation is enjoyed and strengthen in the form of porous border and free movement of the both national citizens in the land of the two nations. The other most important factor for the stronger relationship of the Roti-Beti Ka Rishta is the common origin of the cultural and religious traditions in the both nations. The popular annual circumambulation of the Mithila Madhya Parikrama in the Mithila region is a pilgrimage that symbolizes the "roti-beti ka rishta" by connecting communities in India and Nepal through a shared cultural and religious heritage related to the legendary marriage between Lord Rama and Sita in Mithila.

In recent years, the Devashila Yatra has been one of the major cultural and religious journeys between the two nations to show the ties of the Roti-Beti relation between the two nations publicly. In the year 2026, the Nepalese External Affairs minister Shishir Khannal, during his official visit to the national capital New Delhi in India, described the relationship between the two nations as

"We're not merely neighbours on the map; we're children of the same rivers"

— Shishir Khannal, New Delhi visit of the Nepalese External Affairs minister, 2026

== Challenges and evolving dynamics ==
While traditionally strong, the "Roti-Beti" relationship has faced some challenges in recent years. The new citizenship act in Nepal, political shifts and their anti-Indian sentiments, and border disputes are the major challenges faced by the traditional relationship of Roti-Beti between the two nations. In recent years, due to these challenges, the "Roti Beti Ka Rishta" has seen some decline. Similarly, according to experts, the growing Chinese influence in Nepal is another potential challenge for the "Roti-Beti" relation. It has the potential to hurt the ties of "Roti Beti Ka Rishta" in the future.
