= National Braille Library =

Library in Kathmandu, Nepal

- राष्ट्रिय ब्रेल पुस्तकालय
- 27.6911379831668°N 85.31639586293527°E
- Location: Tripureshwor, Kathmandu, Nepal
- Established: 2009

Collection
- Size: 25,000

The National Braille Library (Nepali: राष्ट्रिय ब्रेल पुस्तकालय) is the first library for visually impaired people in Nepal, and as of 2020, the only one. It is located in Tripureshwor, Kathmandu, in the building of the Nepal Association for the Welfare of the Blind. It was established on 27 March 2009 by Nirmala Gyawali, who herself has a visual impairment. All the books in the library are in English.

The library had about 15-20 visitors per month as of 2017.

== See also ==
- List of libraries in Nepal
