= Tribhuvan University Central Library =

Public library in Nepal

- त्रिभुवन विश्वविद्यालय केन्द्रीय पुस्तकालय
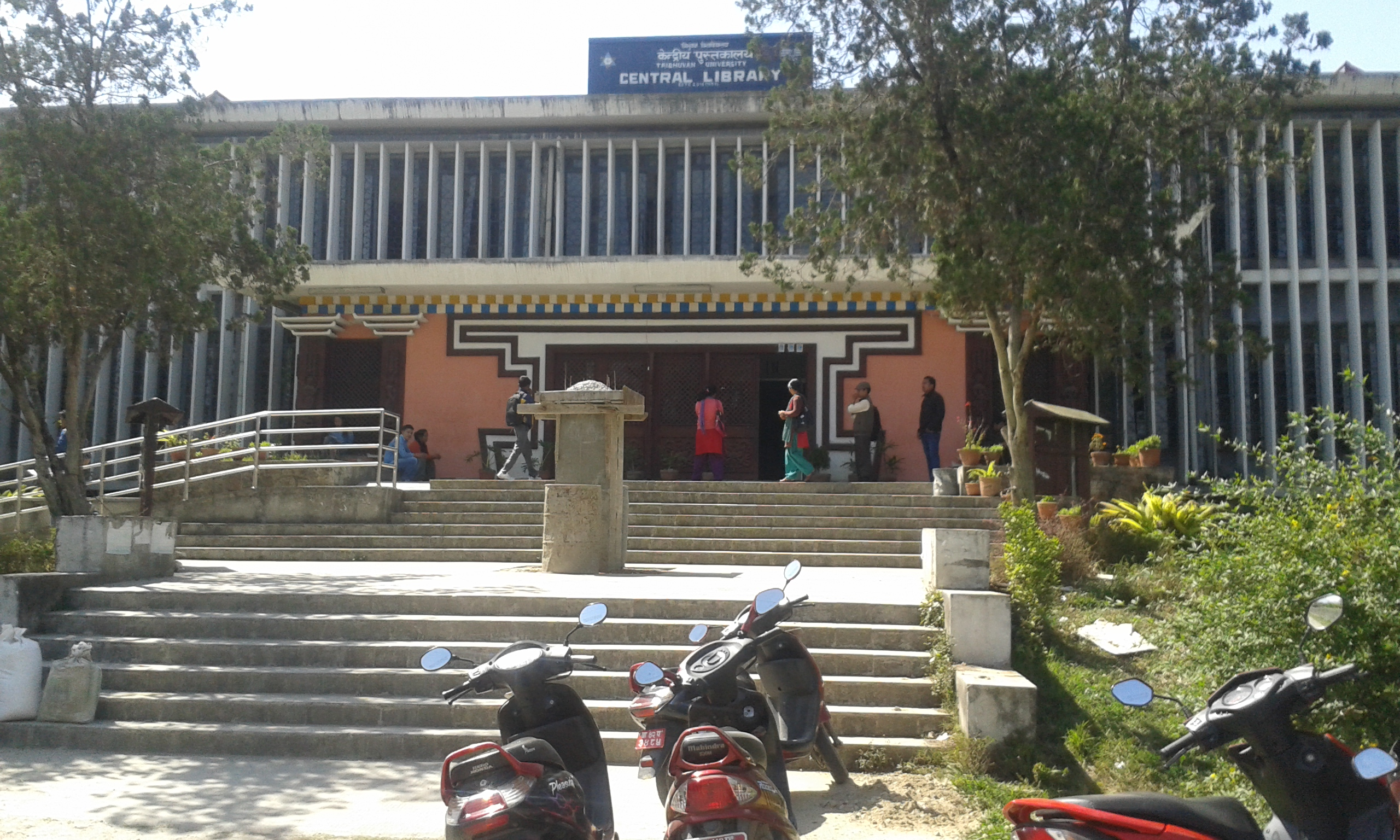
- 27.6818°N 85.2829°E
- Location: Kirtipur, Nepal
- Established: 1959

Collection
- Size: 450,000

Other information
- Affiliation: Tribhuwan University
- Website: www.tucl.org.np

Tribhuvan University Central Library (Nepali: त्रिभुवन विश्वविद्यालय केन्द्रीय पुस्तकालय, Tribhuvan Biswabidyalaya Kendriya Pustakalaya) is an academic library. It is the largest public library in Nepal. It is operated by the Tribhuwan University and is located inside the Tribhuwan University campus at Kirtipur. The Library provides academic resources for students.

== History ==
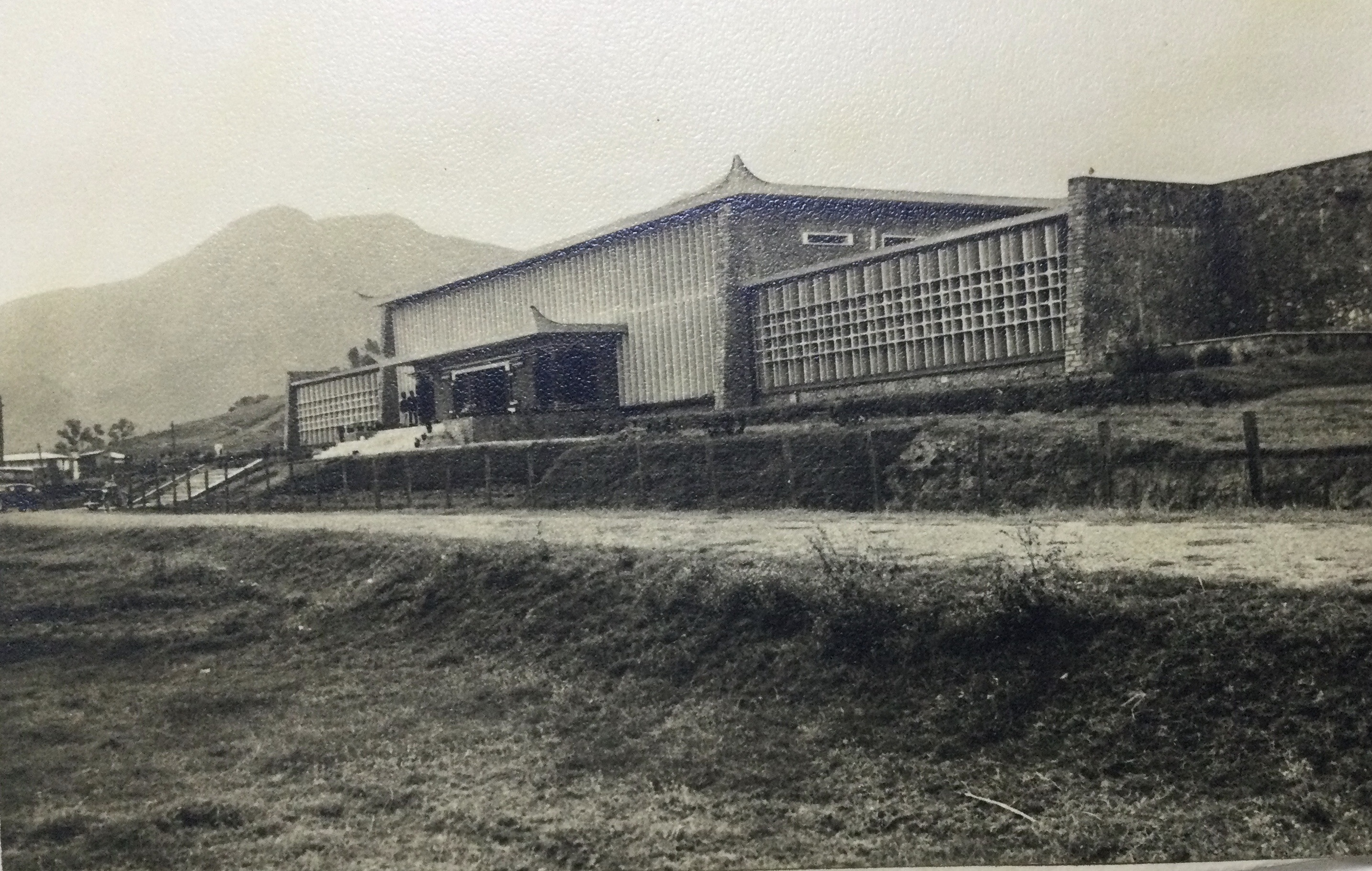
TU Central Library Building in 1967

In 1962, the Central Library of Lal Durbar (established 1957) was merged with the Tribhuvan University Library (established 1959) in accordance to the decision of HMG, Nepal and became Tribhuvan University Library. In 1977 (2033 BS) it was renamed Tribhuvan University Central Library. In 1959 the Central Library had about 1200 books donated by USAID.

== Present day ==
Currently, it hosts about 450,000 books. As of 2020, about 5000 people uses the library in daily basis. The library has a secure section that is not accessible to the general public. This section stores rare books that are over 300 years old.

The earthquake of 2015 damaged some books in the library.

It has two building in function now. The new building was inaugurated by India's foreign minister Dr. S. Jaishankar, Nepali Foreign Minister Narayan Prakash Saud, and the acting Vice Chancellor Shiva Lal Bhusal on 5 January 2024.

== Facilities and Services ==
- It issues ISBN numbers to the books published in Nepal. which was started from 2000.It started issuesing ISBN from online system from 2020.
- Tribhuvan University Central Library provides the core services for the all the researcher, faculties and students that are directly or indirectly involved with Tribhuvan University. (Naresh Maharjan)

== See also ==
- Nepal National Library
- Tribhuwan University
- List of libraries in Nepal
