= Ratanpur Abhiman =

Village in Darbhanga, Bihar, India

Ratanpur Abhiman Ratanpur
- Village
- Ratanpur Abhiman
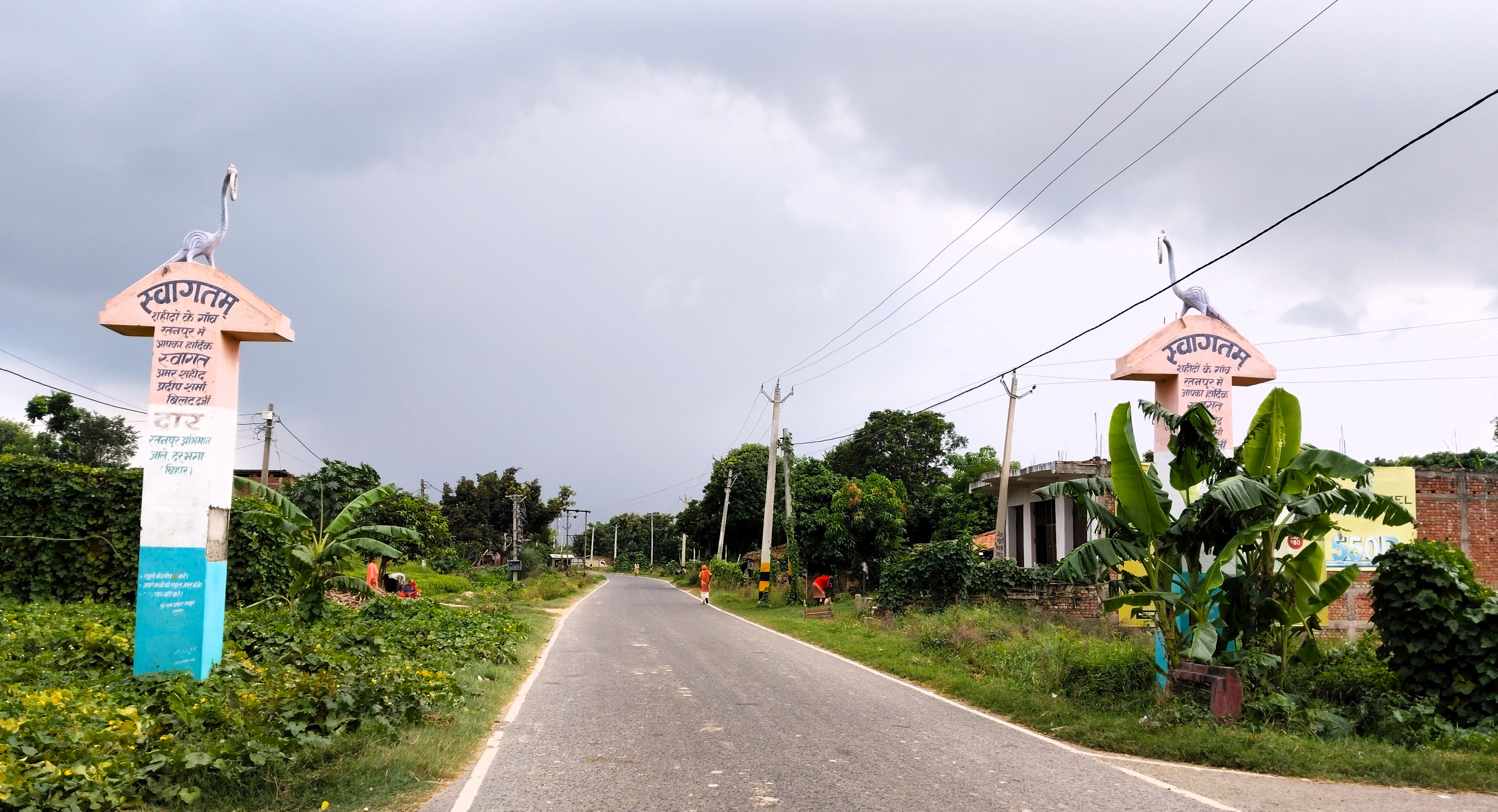
- Entrance Gate marking the village boundary.

- Location in Bihar
- Coordinates: 26°17′28″N 85°44′14″E
- Country: India
- State: Bihar
- Region: Mithila
- District: Darbhanga
- Block: Jale
- Lok Sabha: Madhubani

Government
  - Type: Democracy
  - Body: Sarpanch

Area
  - Total: 6.87 km^{2} (2.65 sq mi)

Population (2011)
  - Total: 8,360

Official
  - Language: Thēthi, Maithili, Hindi, English
- Time zone: UTC+5:30 (IST)
- PIN: 847307
- Vehicle registration: BR-07
- Sex ratio: 4386/3974 ♂/♀
- Literacy: 64.71%
- Nearest city: Darbhanga, Muzaffarpur, Sitamarhi

Ratanpur Abhiman is a historic village located in the Jale block within Drabhanga district, Bihar, known for its cultural heritage and historical legacy. Commonly referred to locally as Ratanpur, the village is also noted in official documents as Ratanpur Mokari.

== History ==
Ratanpur Abhiman dates back to the 13th century, during the rule of the Sena Dynasty in Bengal, which spanned from 1230 to 1295 AD. With the rise of the Deva Dynasty, the Sen Dynasty's last ruler, Keshava Sena, saw his lineage migrate from Bengal, his great-grandson Ratna Sen, a devoted follower of the mother Durga, fled to Mithilanchal. He established a fort near an existing Durga temple, leading to the village being named Ratanpur in his honor.

The village holds historical significance due to its role in the Indian independence movement. During the August Revolution Quit India Movement of 1942, local freedom fighters Pradeep Sharma and Md. Bilat Darjee sacrificed their lives, earning the village the designation of Shaheed Chowk (Martyr's Place).

== Cultural and spiritual legacy ==
Ratanpur Abhiman is noted for its spiritual heritage, notably the Maa Ratneshwari Temple, a revered Vaishnavi Durga Peeth located in the village's eastern part. This temple, which has been a site of worship for centuries, was established by Baba Bam Bholi Das. It is a prominent destination for devotees from Mithilanchal and Nepal, particularly during the Shardiya and Annual Navratri festivals. The temple venerates Durga in her Lakshmi Swarupa form, with worship centered around a sacred Pindi rather than a statue. The temple does not practice animal sacrifice, reflecting its tranquil and devout nature.

Additionally, Ratanpur Abhiman is home to the Gangeshwar Asthan, dedicated to Lord Shiva. This ancient temple is another significant spiritual site in the village, enhancing its religious and cultural prominence. Devotees visit the Gangeshwar Temple to seek blessings from Lord Shiva, adding to the village's reputation as a center of worship and spiritual significance.

== Demographics ==
Population in Ratanpur
1. Male Population (52.4%)
2. Female Population (47.6%)

Ratanpur Abhiman situated in the Jale Block within Darbhanga district, Bihar having a total of 1,871 households. The village's population is 8,360, comprising 4,386 males and 3,974 females according to the 2011 Population Census Data. Among the inhabitants of Ratanpur Abhiman, there are 1,360 children aged 0–6, accounting for 16.27% of the total population. The village's average sex ratio is 906, which is below the Bihar state average of 918. The child sex ratio in Ratanpur Abhiman stands at 957, surpassing the Bihar average of 935.

Literacy in Ratanpur Abhiman
Literacy	Percent
Male	71.25%
Female	57.42%
All	64.71%

Ratanpur Abhiman boasts a higher literacy rate compared to the state average. In 2011, the literacy rate in the village was 64.71%, compared to Bihar's average of 61.80%. The male literacy rate in Ratanpur Abhiman is 71.25%, whereas the female literacy rate is 57.42%.

Census Parameter	Census Data	Percentage	Census Parameter	Census Data	Percentage
Total Population	8,360	NA	Literacy Rate - Males	3,126	71.25%
Total No of Houses	1,871	NA	Literacy Rate - Females	2,283	57.42%
Male Population	4,386	52.5%	Literate Males	3,126	71.25%
Female Population	3,974	47.5%	Illiterate Males	1,260	28.75%
Total Literacy Rate	6,430	64.7%	Literate Females	2,283	57.42%
Scheduled Caste Population	1,084	13.0%	Illiterate Females	1,691	42.58%
Girl Child (0–6) Population	665	7.95%	Total Literate Population	5,409	64.71%
Boy Child (0–6) Population	1,360	16.2%	Total Illiterate Population	2,951	35.3%
Working Population	2,434	29.1%	Non-Working Population	5,926	70.1%

Data taken from 2011 Population Census

== Tourist places ==
Ratanpur Abhiman is known for its tranquil environment and spiritual significance. Nearby, you can explore several notable attractions:

1. Gangeshwar Asthan: A sacred site dedicated to lord Shiva, It is also known as Mahadev Asthan locally, attracting devotees seeking blessings and peace.
2. Maa Ratneshwari Temple: A prominent temple dedicated to Goddess Durga, known for its spiritual significance and vibrant festivals.
3. Shaheed Chowk: Memorial site commemorating two local martyrs Pradip Sharma and Mohammad Bilat Darjee who died during a clash with British forces in August 1942, part of the Quit India Movement.
4. Chaitanya Kuti: A temple dedicated to Lord Krishna and Radha, known for its devotional atmosphere and serene surroundings.
5. Beegan Baba Kuti: A holy site dedicated to Lord Rama, offering a peaceful retreat and spiritual solace.
6. Gautam Ashram: A revered pilgrimage site associated with sage Gautama Maharishi, known as Gautam Kund for its spiritual ambiance and historical importance.
7. Ahalya Sthan: A significant place connected to the legend of Ahalya from the Ramayana, offering a glimpse into ancient mythology.

== Notable people ==
- Kapildeo Thakur (MLA) - Jale Assembly Election 1977
- Dr. Mahendra Singh M.D. in Homeopathy
- Pradip Sharma & Bilat Darjee - Martyred freedom fighters of India

== Transport ==
=== Road ===
Ratanpur is well-connected by road to Darbhanga. Travelers can use the following routes:

- National Highway 57 (India)
- NH527B
- NH527C

=== Railways ===
- Kamtaul Railway Station: A nearby station located very close to Ratanpur.
- Muraitha Halt: It is also in close proximity to Ratanpur.
- Darbhanga Junction Railway Station: It is situated near Ratanpur, this station provides access to Ratanpur from nearby towns.

=== Air ===
- Darbhanga Airport: The nearest airport to Ratanpur, located approximately 30 km away. It offers flights to and from various destinations for convenient air travel.

== Village's Gallery ==
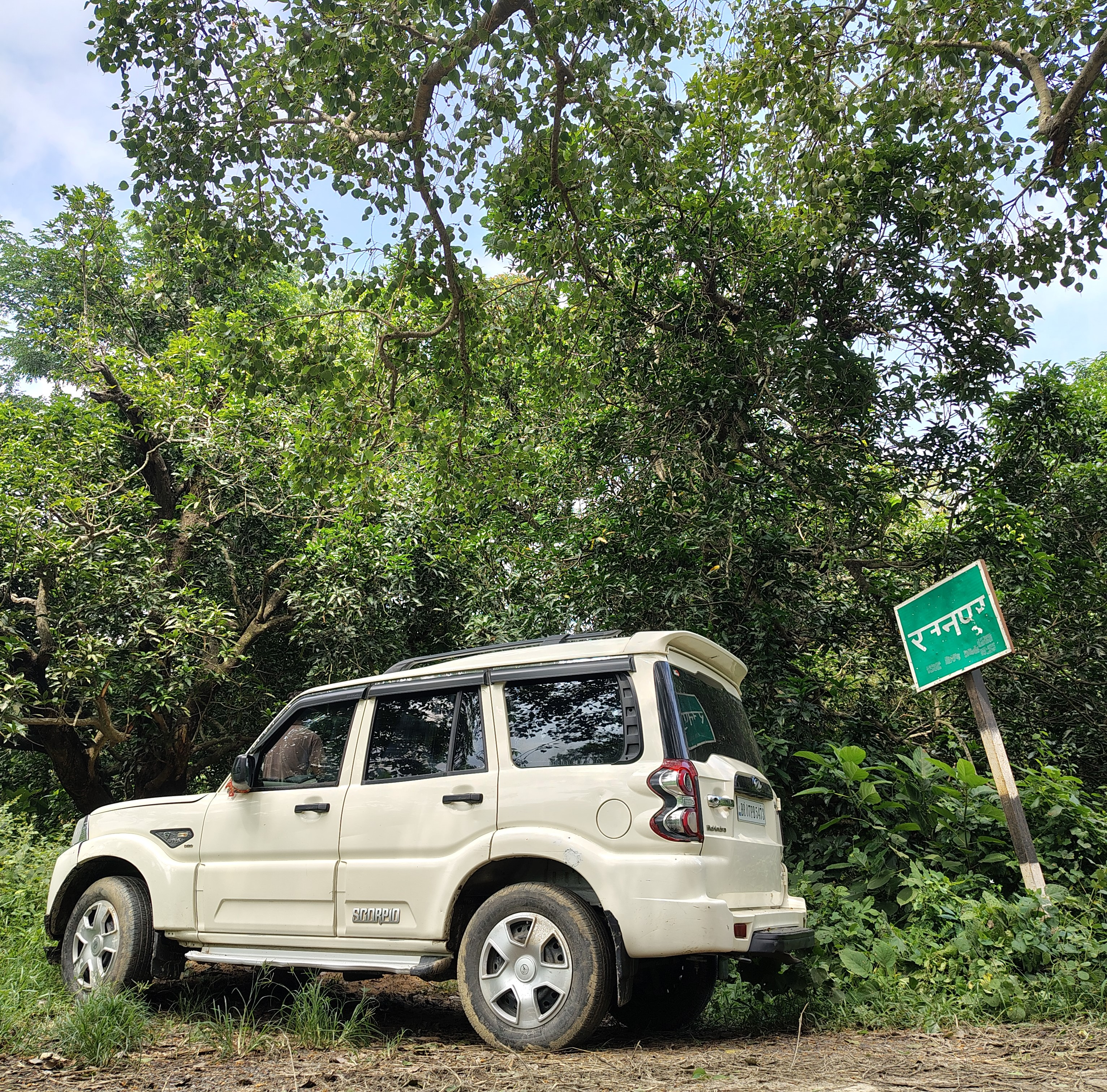
Ratanpur Abhiman Village's sign board

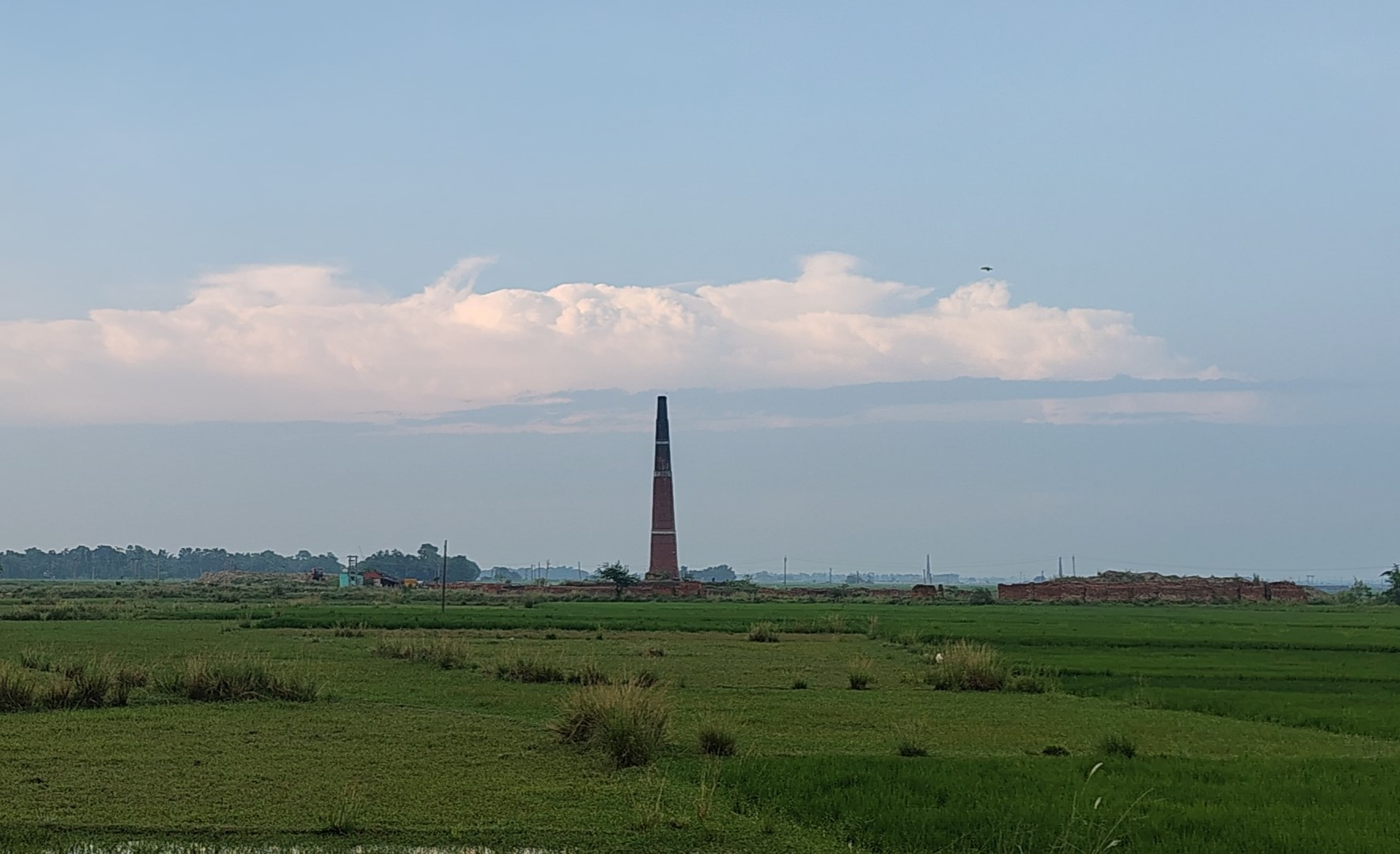
This chimny is in Ratanpur Abhiman Village which is used for making mud/soil's bricks.

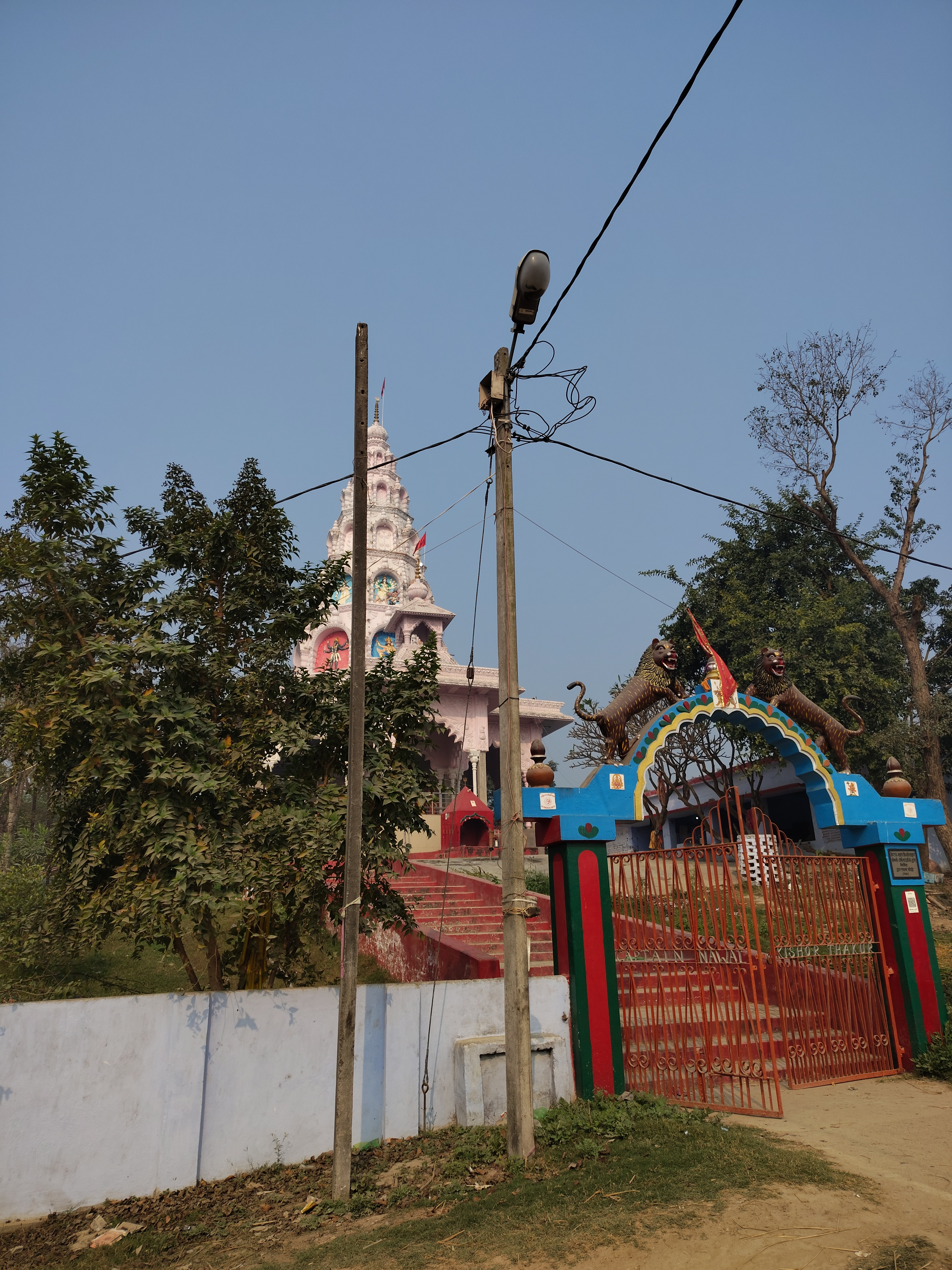
Maa Ratneshwari Temple Intrance

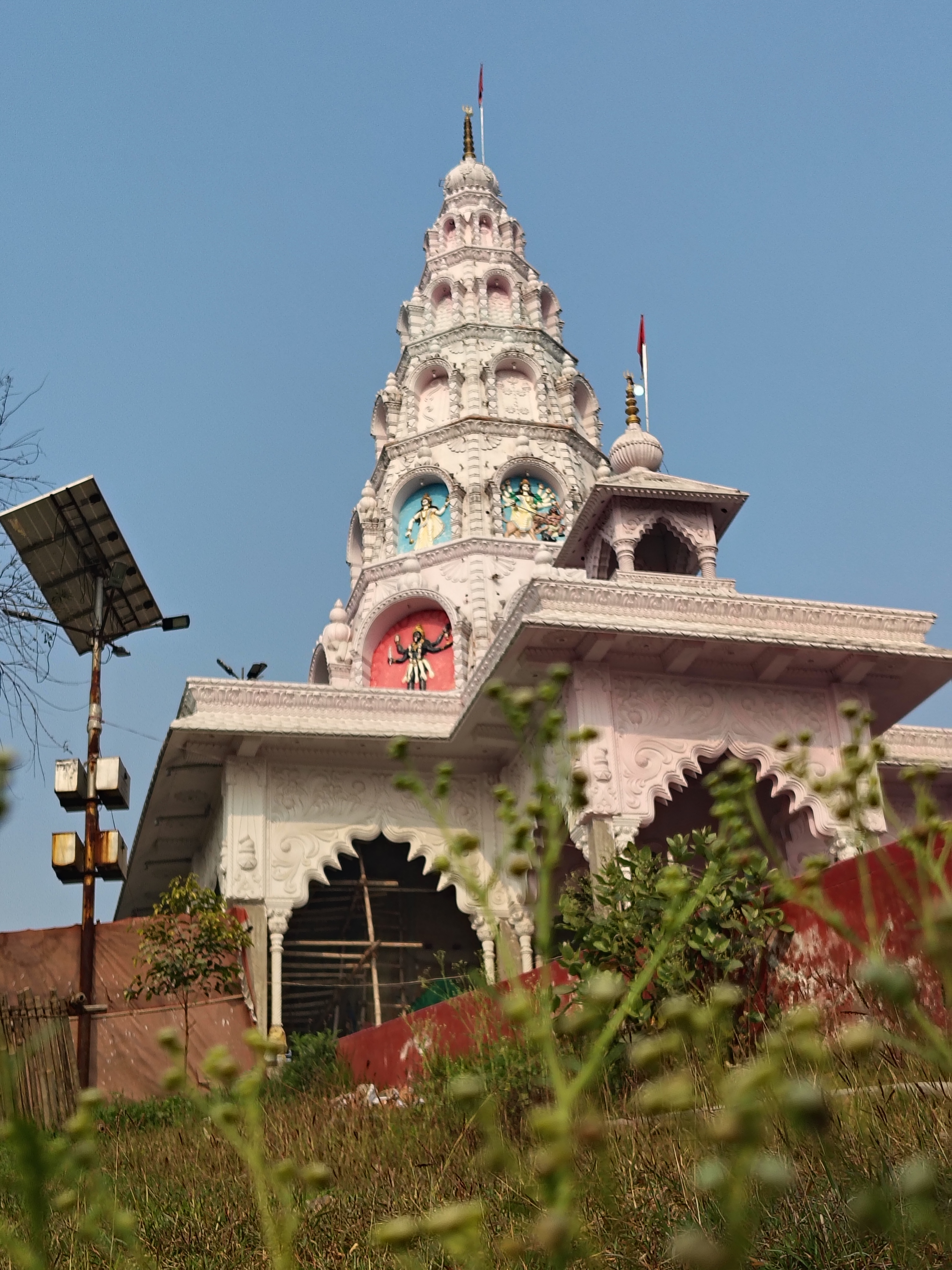
Top View of Maa Ratneshwari Temple

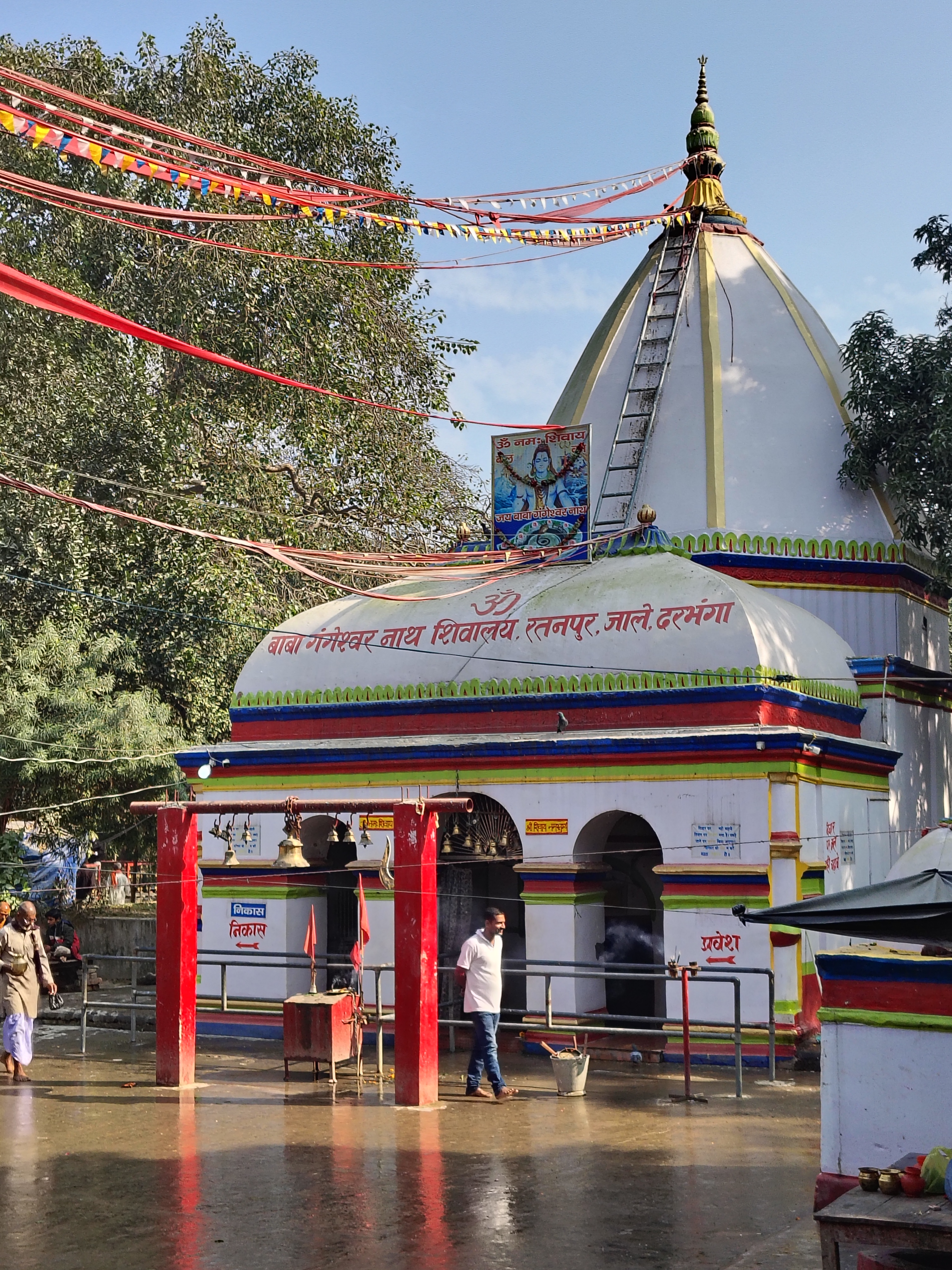
Baba Gangeshwarnath Temple which come under Baba Gangeshwarnath Tirth Chetra in Ratanpur Abhiman

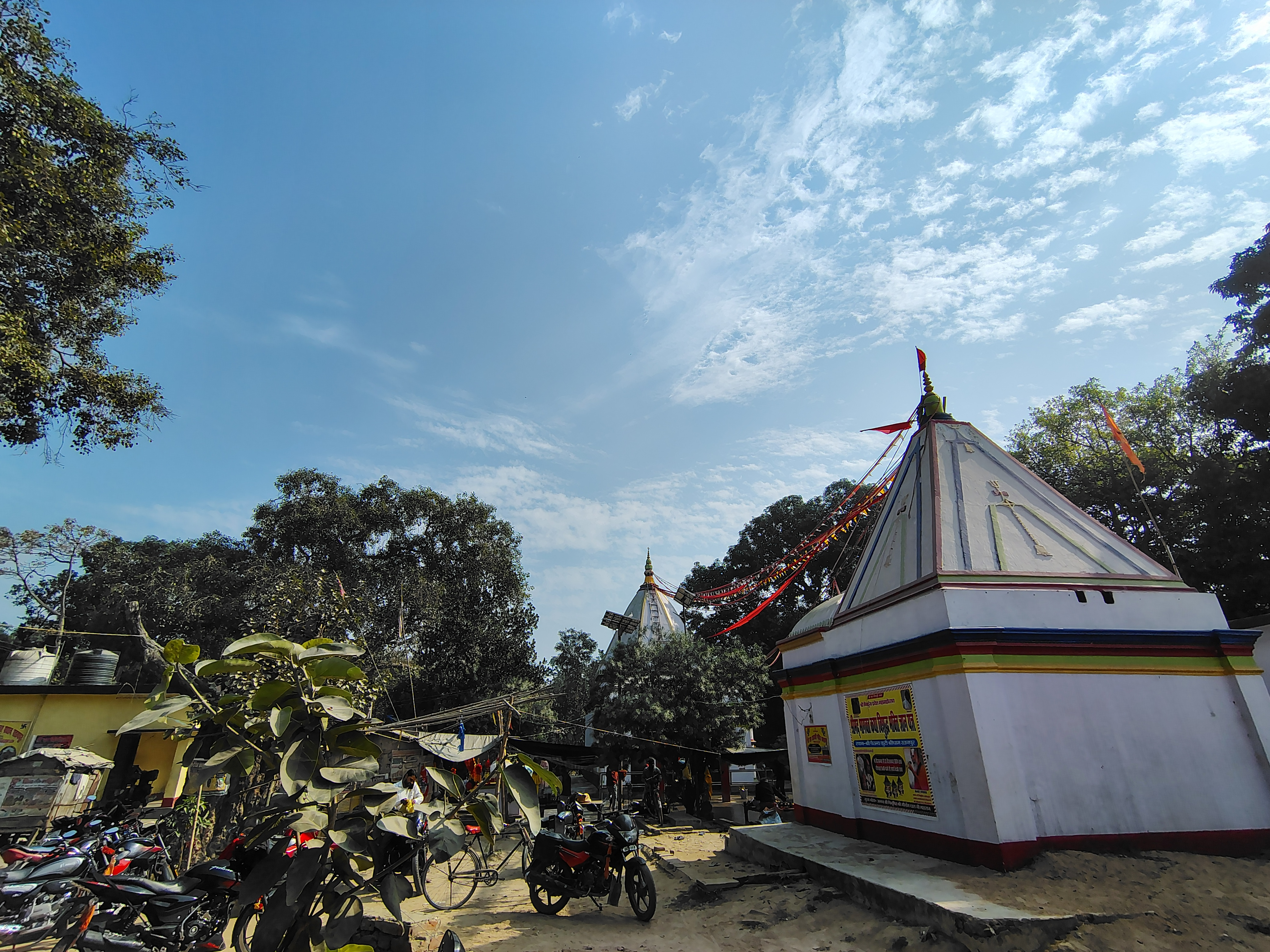
Parking area in Baba Gangeshwarnath Temple, Ratanpur abhiman

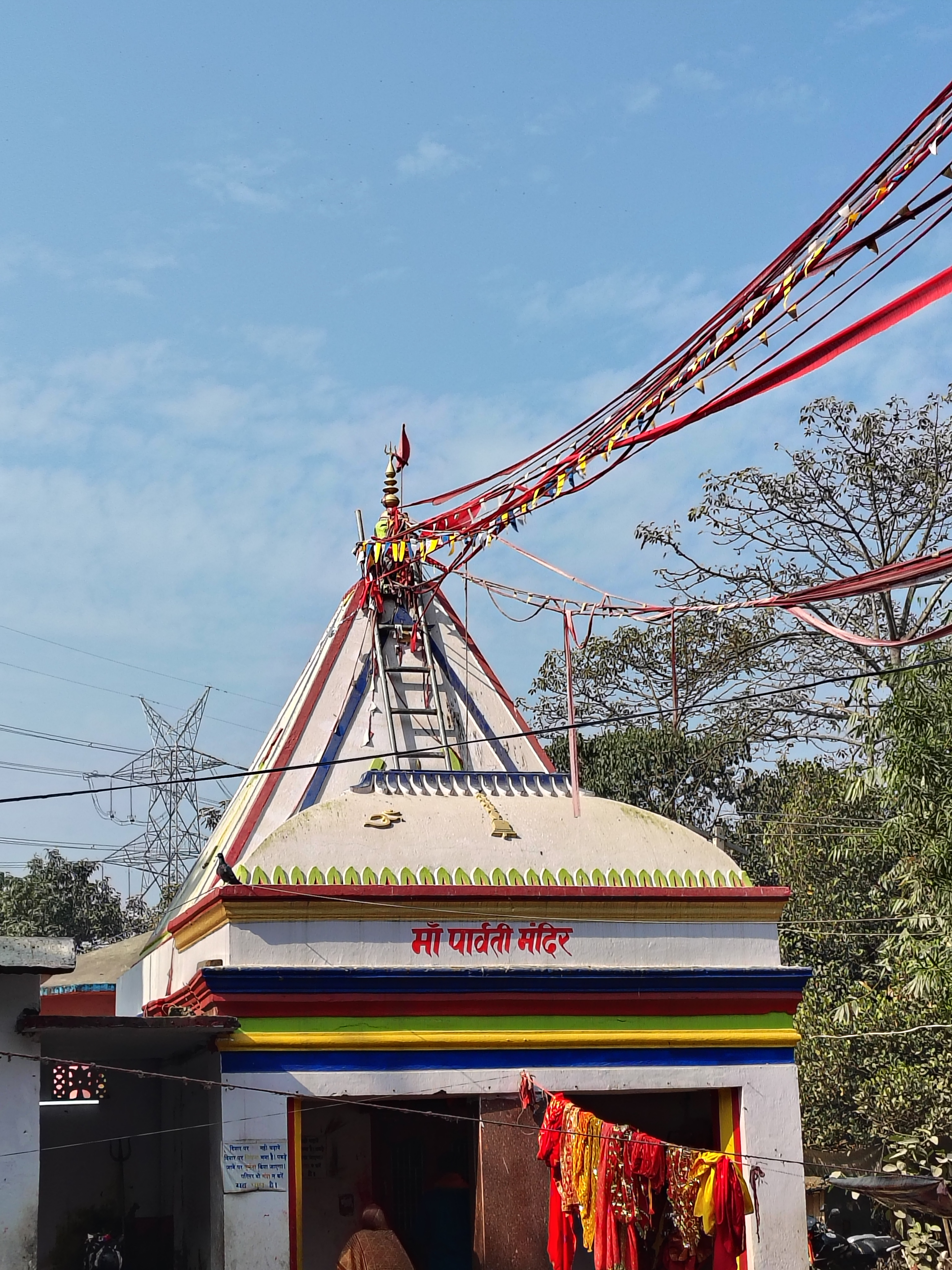
Maa Parvati Temple inside Baba Gangeshwarnath Temple Permises

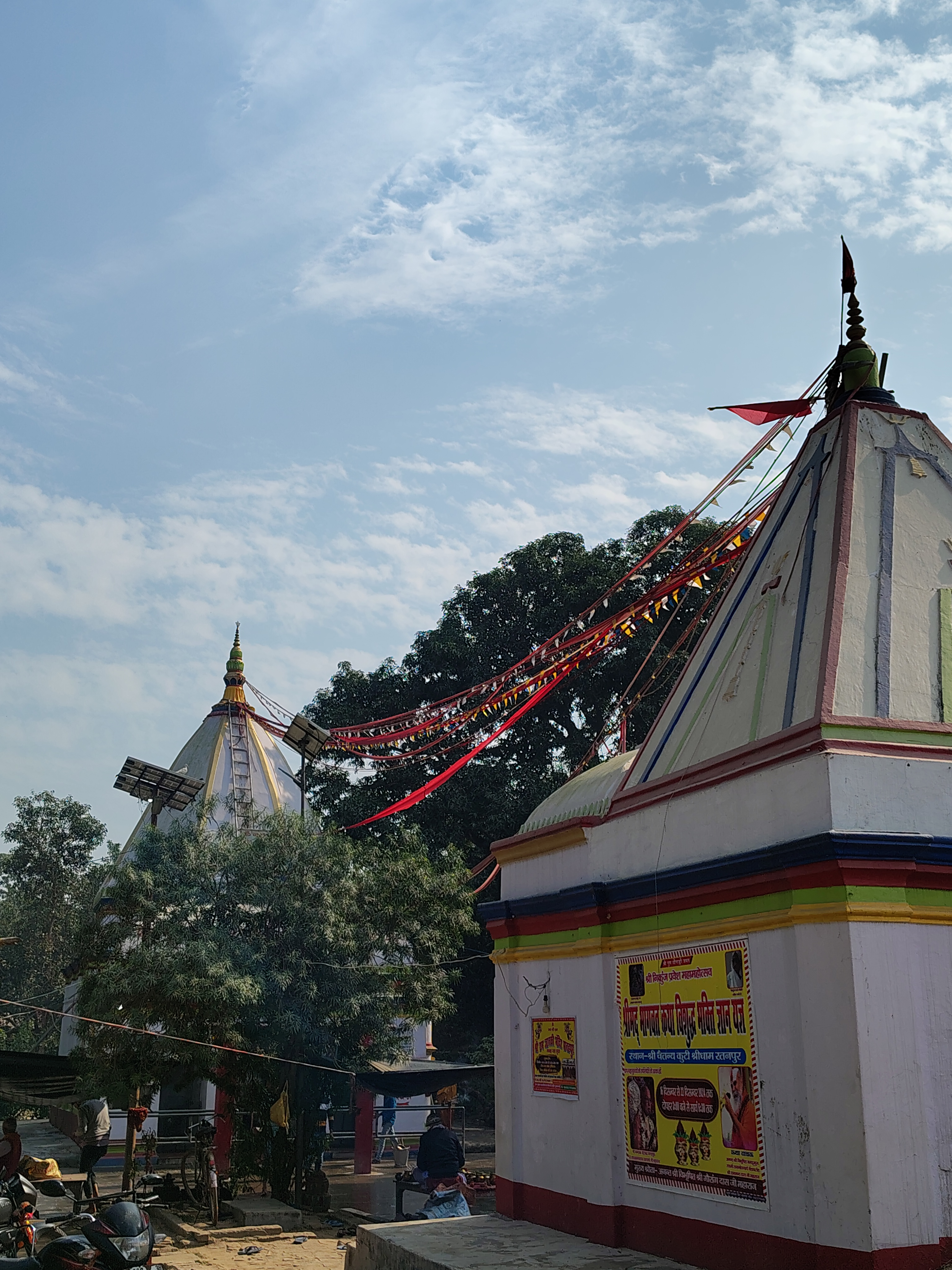
Maa Parvati Temple and Gangeshwarnath Temple Together view
