= Rarhi =

Rarhi may refer to:

- A person from the Rarh region of eastern India
- Rarhi dialect or West Bengali dialect, a dialect of the Bengali language spoken in the Rarh region in West Bengal, India
- Rarhi, Bihar, a village of India
