= Rarhi, Bihar =

Village in Bihar, India

Rarhi
- Village
- Location within Bihar Location within India
- Coordinates: 26°20′44″N 85°44′04″E
- Country: India
- State: Bihar
- District: Darbhanga
- Block: Jale

Government
  - Type: Sarpanch

Area
  - Total: 28.61 km^{2} (11.05 sq mi)
- Elevation: 57 m (187 ft)

Population (2011)
  - Total: 36,569
  - Density: 1,278/km^{2} (3,310/sq mi)

Languages
  - Official: Hindi, Maithili
- Time zone: UTC+5:30 (IST)
- PIN: 847302
- STD code: 06228
- Vehicle registration: BR-07

Rarhi is a village in Jale Block, Darbhanga District, Bihar, India. It is located near the northern border of the country, about 27 kilometres northwest of the district capital Darbhanga, and 5 kilometres south of the block capital Jale, Bihar. In the year 2011, it has a population of 36,569.

== Geography ==
Rarhi is located to the north of Bagmati River. The Jale-Atarwel Path passes through the west of the village. Its total area is 2861 hectares.

== Demographics ==
According to the 2011 Census of India, there are 7,500 households within Rarhi. Among the 36,569 inhabitants, 18,868 are male and 17,701 are female. The total literacy rate is 42.45%, with 9,284 of the male population and 6,238 of the female population being literate. Its census location code is 226751.
