= Gangeshwar Asthan =

Baba Gangeshwarnath Mandir
- बाबा गंगेश्वर नाथ मंदिर
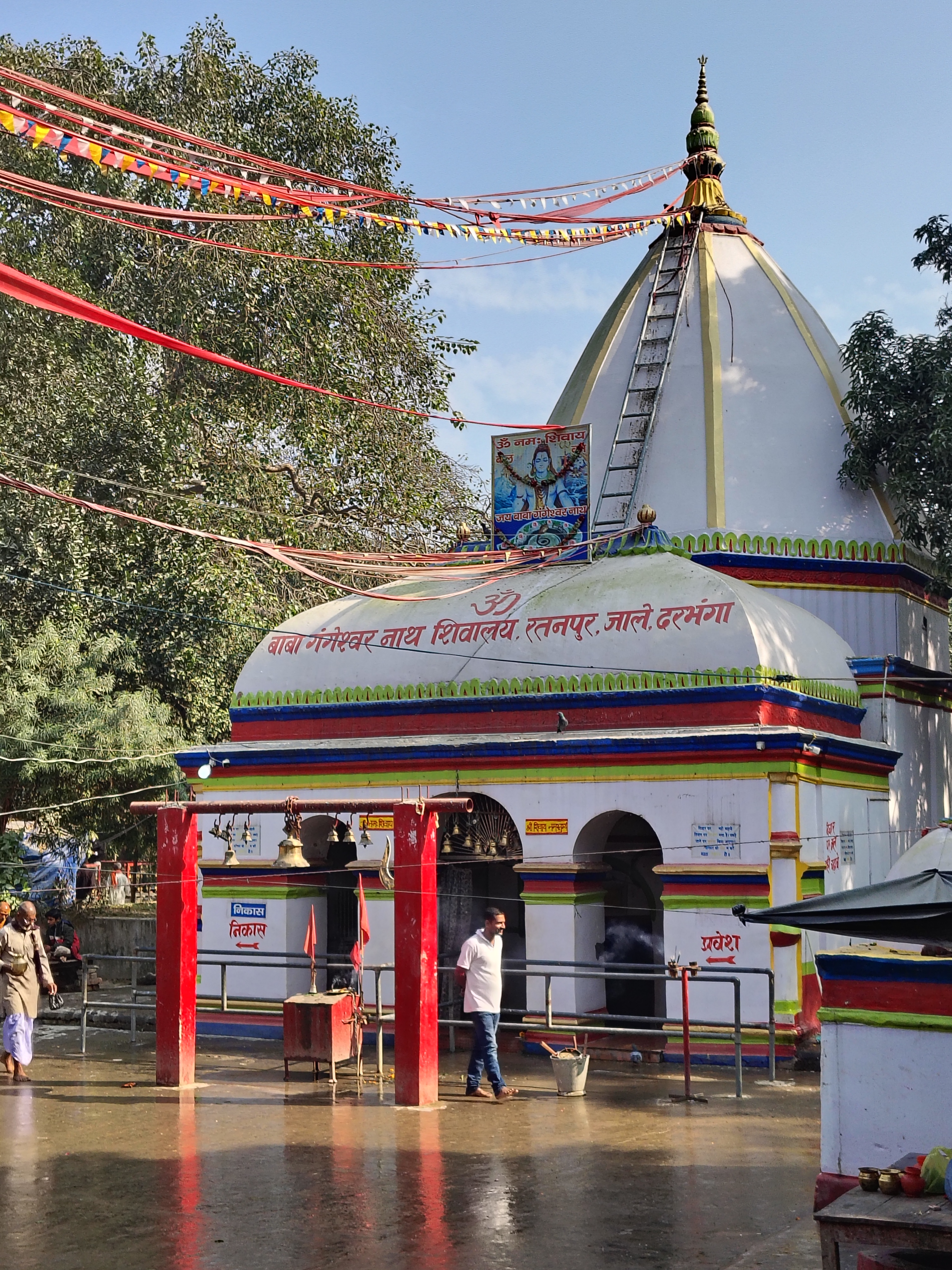
- Baba Gangeshwarnath Temple

- Location of Baba Gangeshwarnath Temple in Bihar

Religion
- Affiliation: Hinduism
- District: Darbhanga
- Deity: Shiva (Baba Gangeshwarnath)
- Festivals: Maha Shivaratri, Shravana, Kartik Purnima
- Governing body: Baba Gangeshwarnath Tirth Chetra

Location
- Location: Ratanpur Abhiman
- State: Bihar
- Country: India
- Interactive map of Baba Gangeshwarnath Mandir
- Coordinates: 26.290991°N 85.7193969°E

Architecture
- Type: Tirhut style
- Completed: Unknown

Specifications
- Direction of façade: West
- Temple: 1
- Elevation: 53 m (174 ft)Approximate elevation

Baba Gangeshwar Nath Temple, also known as Baba Gangeshwar Asthan or locally called Gangeshwar Asthan or Mahadev Asthan, is a Hindu temple located in the western part of Ratanpur Abhiman, in Darbhanga, Bihar. The temple is dedicated to Shiva in his Shiva lingam form and has been a site of religious significance for centuries. The temple is managed under the Baba Gangeshwarnath Tirth Chetra.

== History ==
The history of the temple dates back to approximately 800 years. According to historical records, between 1160 and 1170 CE, Gangadeva, the son of King Nanyadeva, established a Shiva Lingam in the dense forests of Ratanpur Abhiman during his military preparations. His purpose was to seek divine blessings while strategizing to reclaim his father's kingdom. Along with the temple, he also commissioned the excavation of a pond to ensure water availability, which is now known as Rajkhani Pokhar. Following his successful campaign against King Ballāla Sena and the liberation of his father, the temple was consecrated and named Gangeshwar Asthan after Gangadev.

Another belief suggests that approximately 150 years ago, a local Shiva devotee named Gangeshwar Mishra from Prasadi Tola, inspired by a divine vision, reconstructed and re-consecrated the temple. Over time, the temple became known as Gangeshwar Asthan, attributed to his name.

== Significance and features ==
The temple holds religious significance among devotees, who frequently visit to offer prayers. A unique aspect of the temple is the tradition of drawing water from the deep pond within the temple premises for worship. The temple witnesses a large congregation of devotees on festivals such as Vasant Panchami, Narak Nivaran Chaturdashi, and Maha Shivaratri, during which the temple is elaborately decorated. During the Shravan month, special arrangements are made due to the large influx of pilgrims.

Devotees from distant places, including Simaria, Pahela Ghat, and Sultanganj, bring holy water from the River Ganges for the ritualistic Jalabhishek of Lord Shiva. There is also a traditional belief that the pond's water is not used for irrigation, as it is considered to hold divine energy.

== Gallery ==
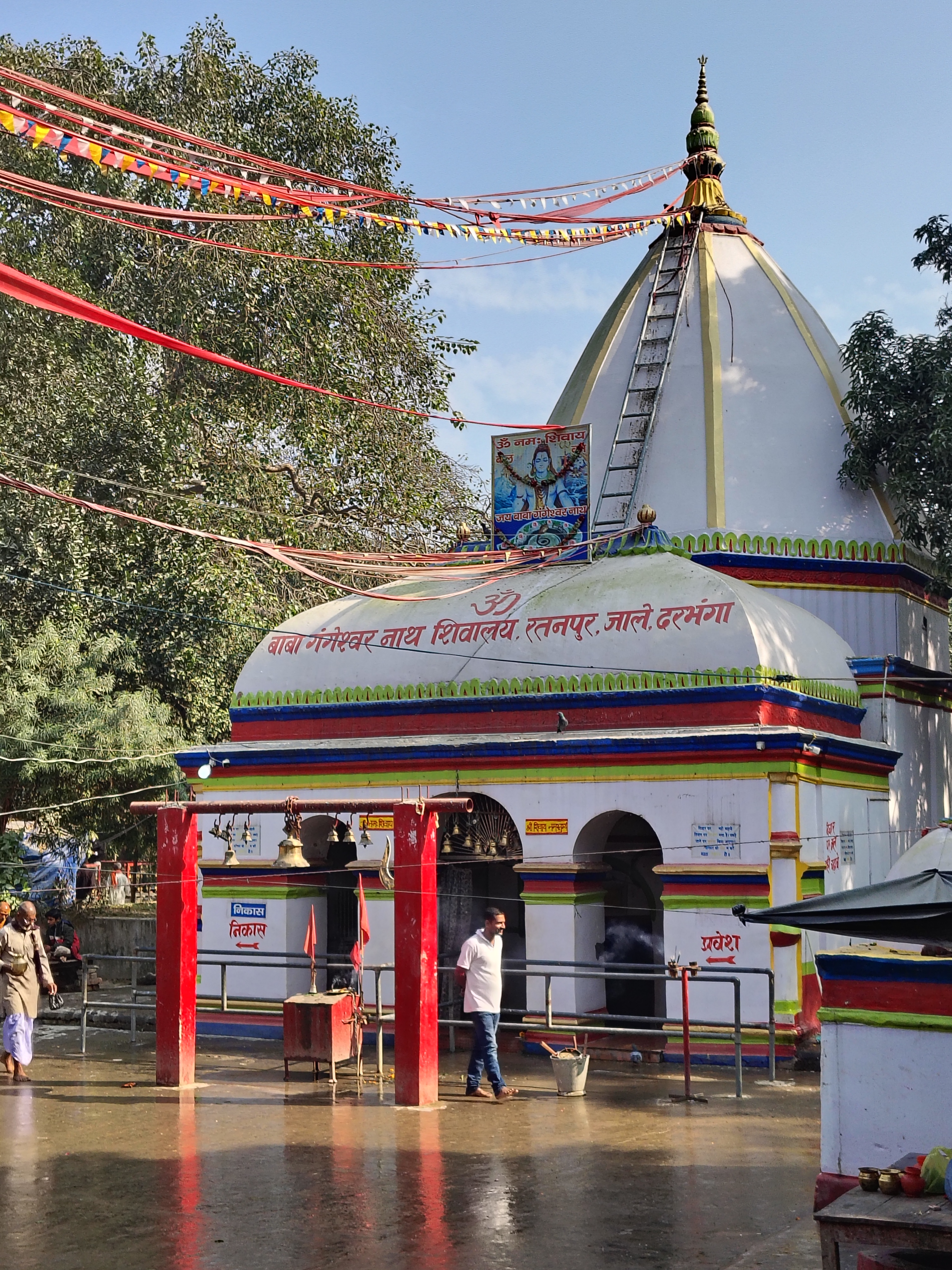
Mahadev Temple Intrance

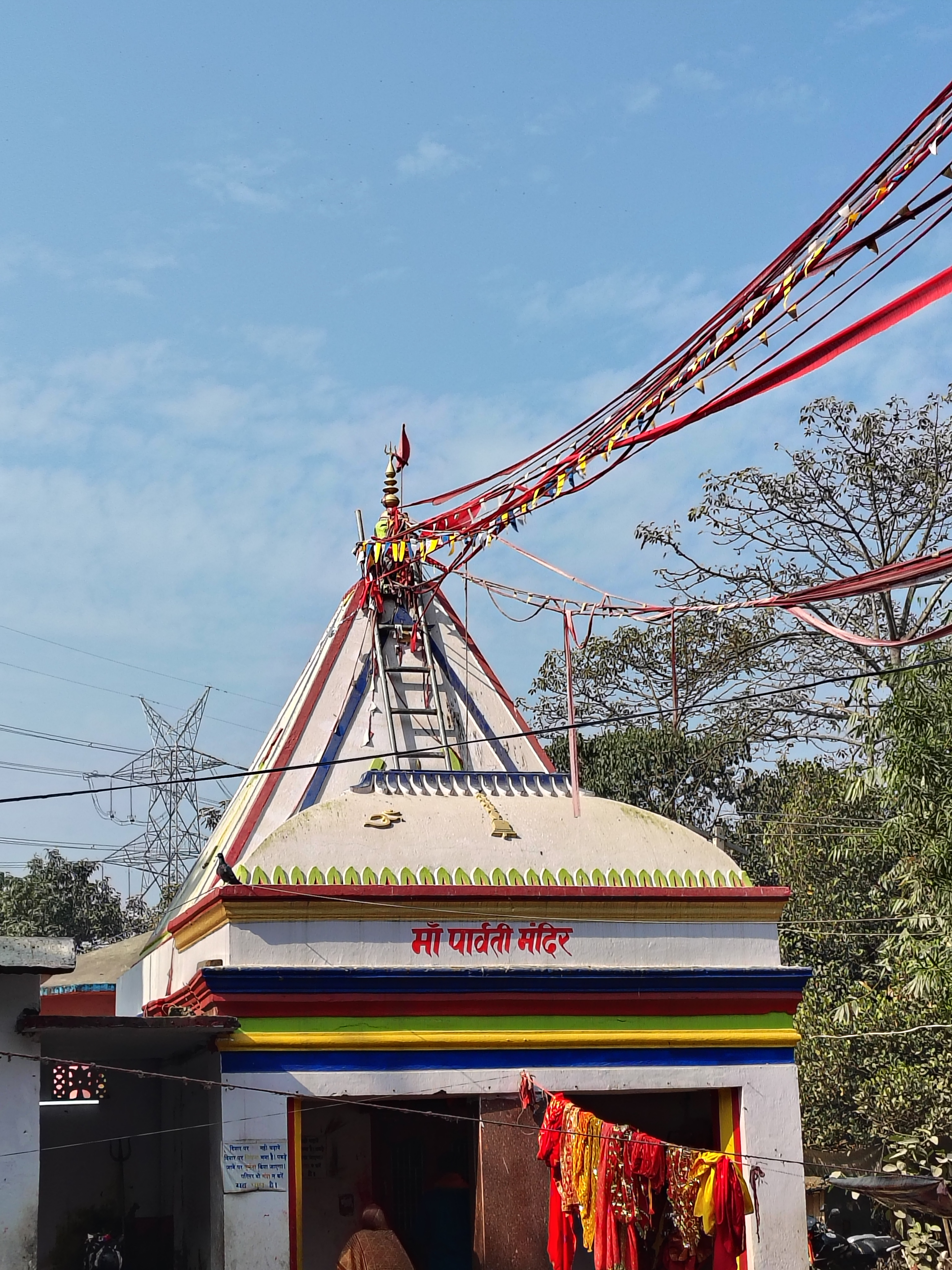
Maa Parvati Temple inside Baba Gangeshwarnath Temple Permises

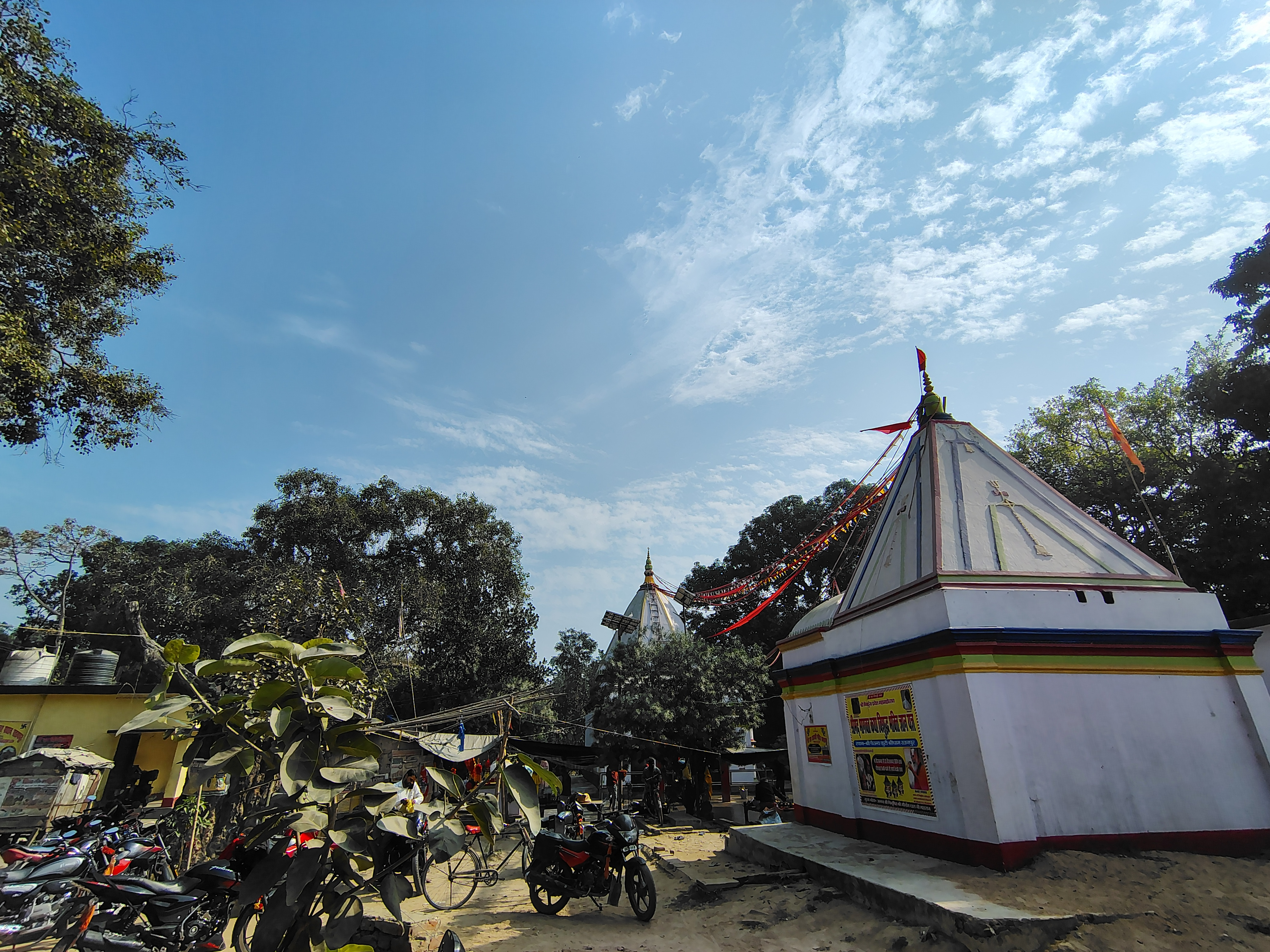
Parking area in Baba Gangeshwarnath Temple

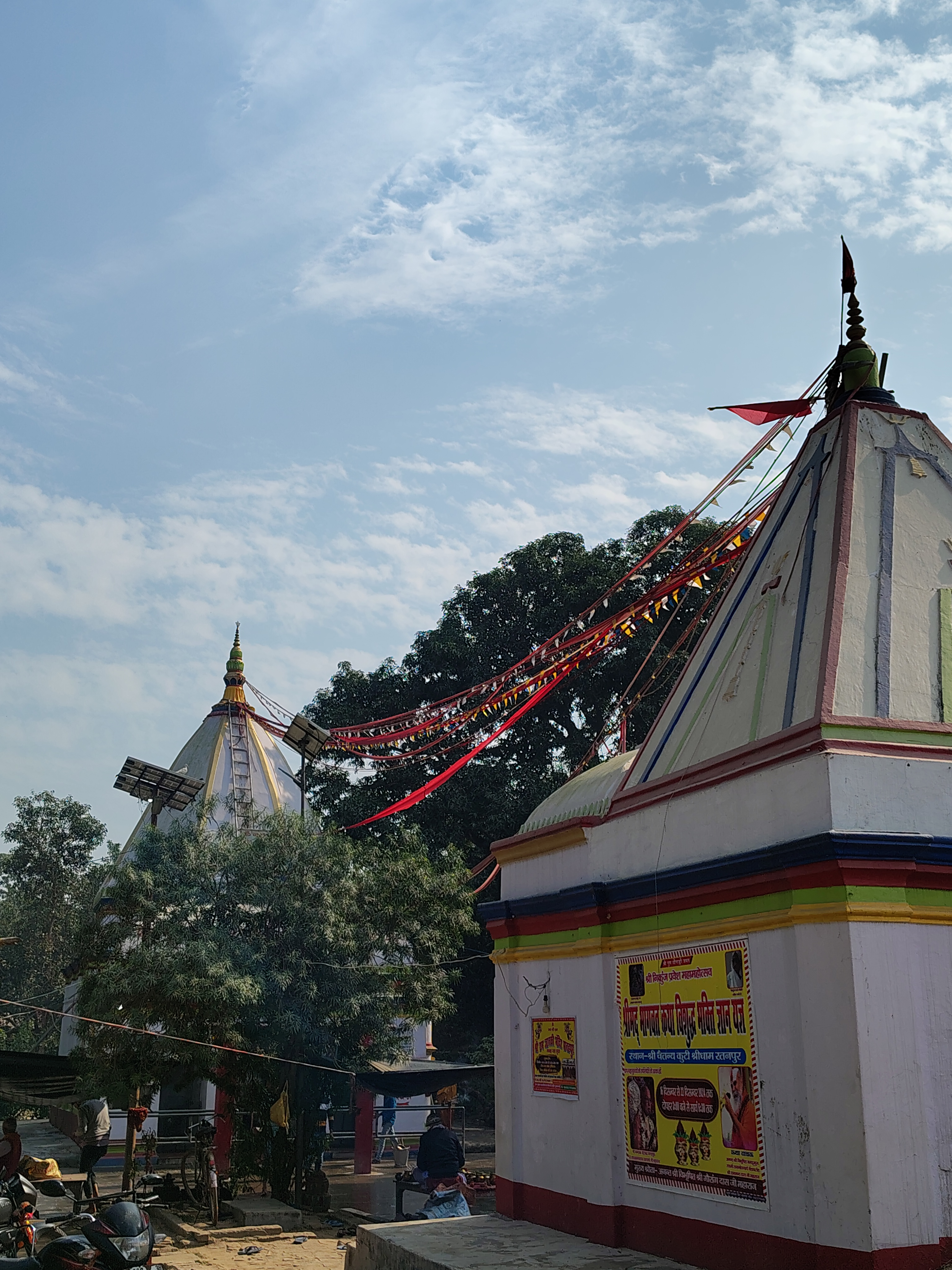
Maa Parvati Temple and Gangeshwarnath Temple Together view
