= Maa Ratneshwari Temple =

Maa Ratneshwari Mandir
- माँ रत्नेश्वरी मंदिर
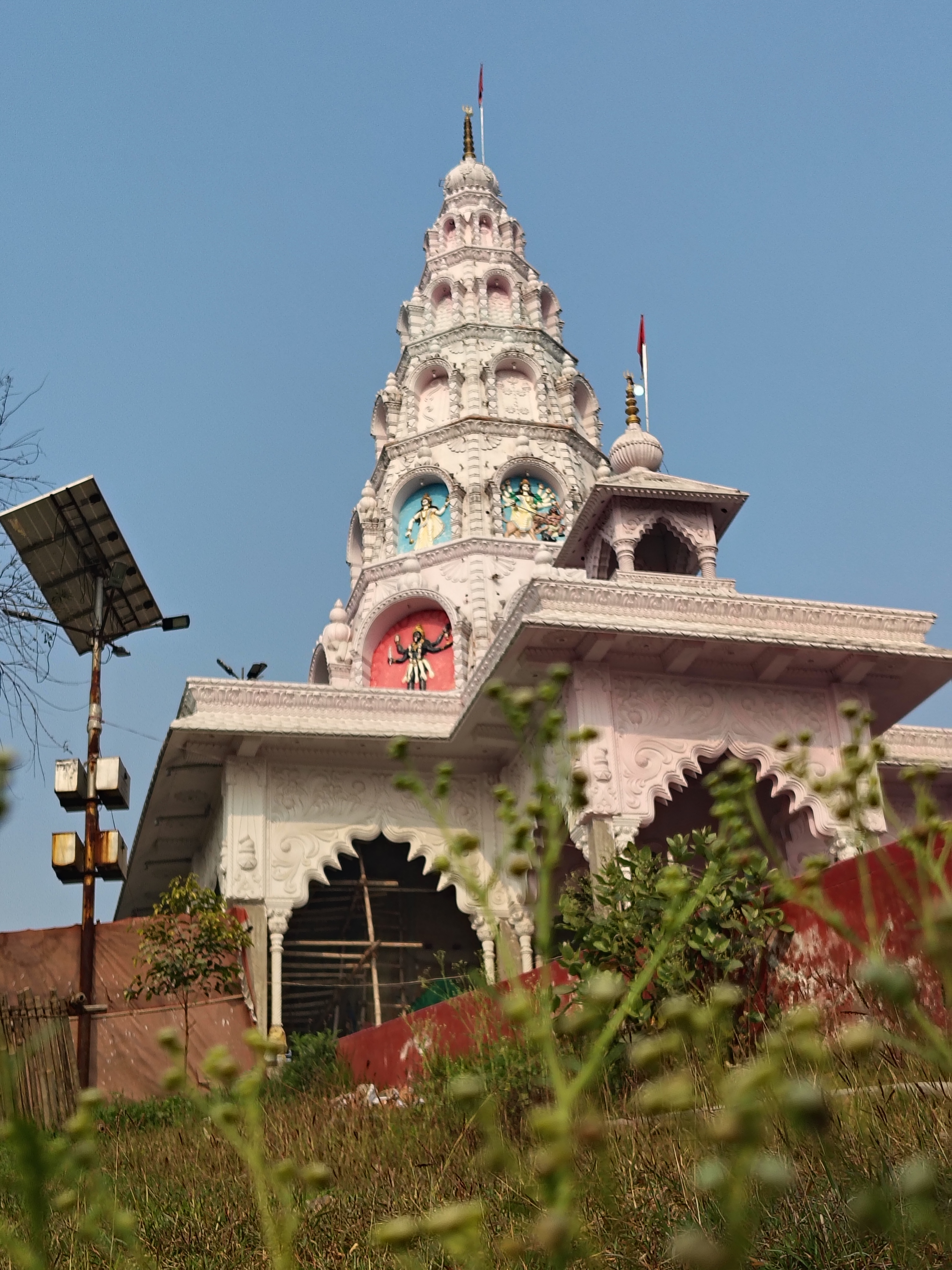
- Top View of Maa Ratneshwari Temple

- Location of Maa Ratneshwari Mandir in Bihar

Religion
- Affiliation: Hinduism
- District: Darbhanga
- Deity: Durga (Maa Ratneshwari Devi)
- Festivals: Navaratri, Durga Puja
- Governing body: Maa Ratneshwari Pooja Samiti

Location
- Location: Ratanpur Abhiman
- State: Bihar
- Country: India
- Interactive map of Maa Ratneshwari Mandir
- Coordinates: 26.292112°N 85.7414439°E

Architecture
- Type: Traditional Hindu Temple
- Completed: Unknown

Specifications
- Direction of façade: East
- Temple: 1
- Elevation: 52 m (171 ft)Approximate elevation

Website
- "www.jaymaaratneshwari.com". Archived from the original on 2024-09-15.

Maa Ratneshwari Temple, also known as Maa Ratneshwari Mandir or locally called Durga Asthan, is a Hindu temple located in the eastern part of Ratanpur Abhiman, in Darbhanga, Bihar. The temple is dedicated to Maa Durga in her Lakshmi Swarupa form and has been a site of religious significance for centuries.

== History ==
It was established by Baba Bam Bholi Das, following its original foundation by Ratna Sen, a devoted follower of the Durga, during the rule of the Sena Dynasty in Bengal. Ratna Sen, the great-grandson of Keshava Sena, the last ruler of the Sena Dynasty, migrated to Mithilanchal and established a fort near an existing Durga temple. The temple is considered a prominent pilgrimage destination, particularly for devotees from the Mithilanchal region and Nepal.

== Significance and Features ==
The temple is known for its peaceful and serene atmosphere, and its worship practices are centered around a sacred Pindi rather than an idol. It does not practice animal sacrifice, which aligns with its tranquil nature. The temple attracts a large number of devotees, especially during the Shardiya Navaratri and Navaratri festivals.

== Gallery ==
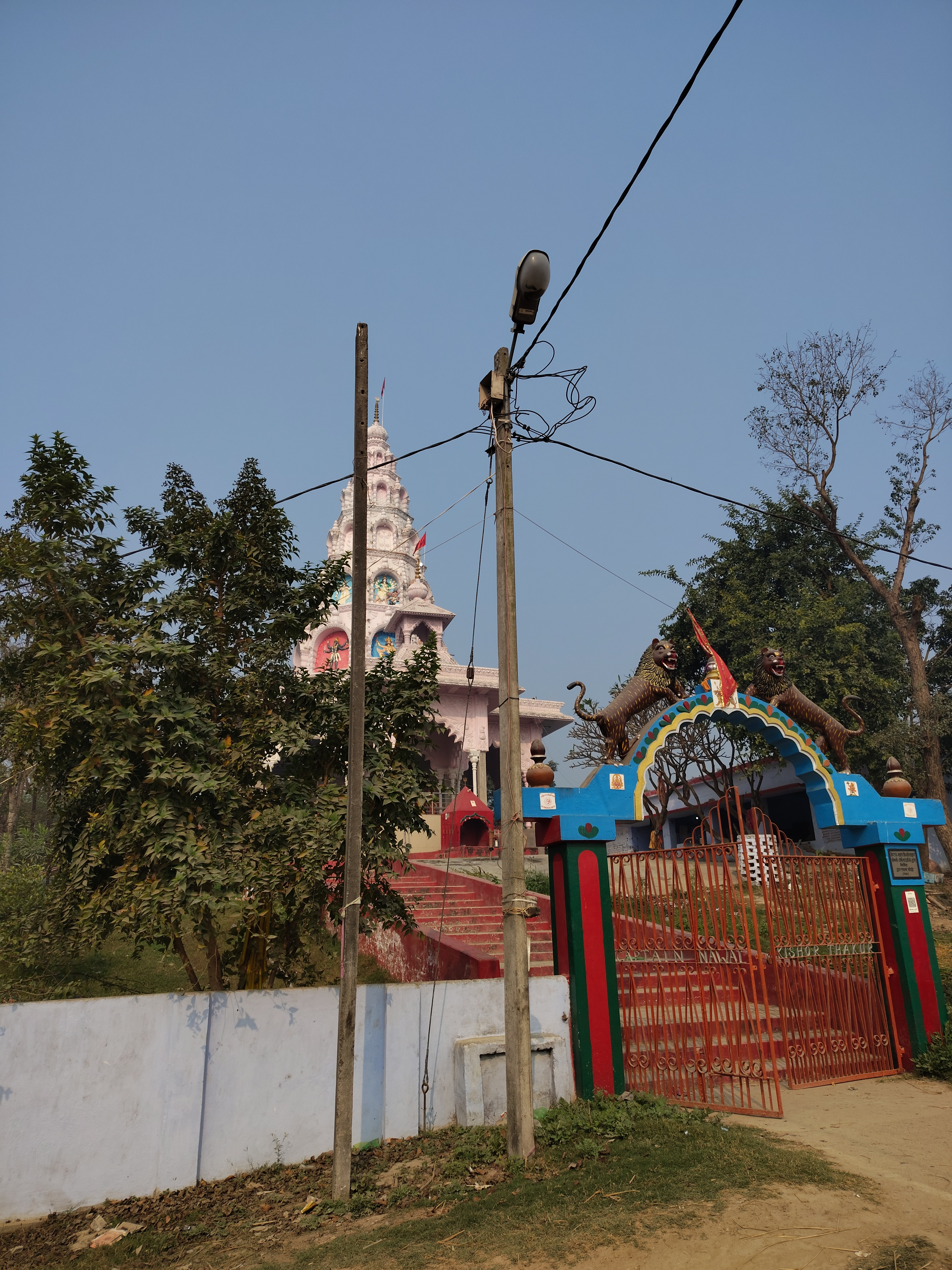
Maa Ratneshwari Temple Intrance

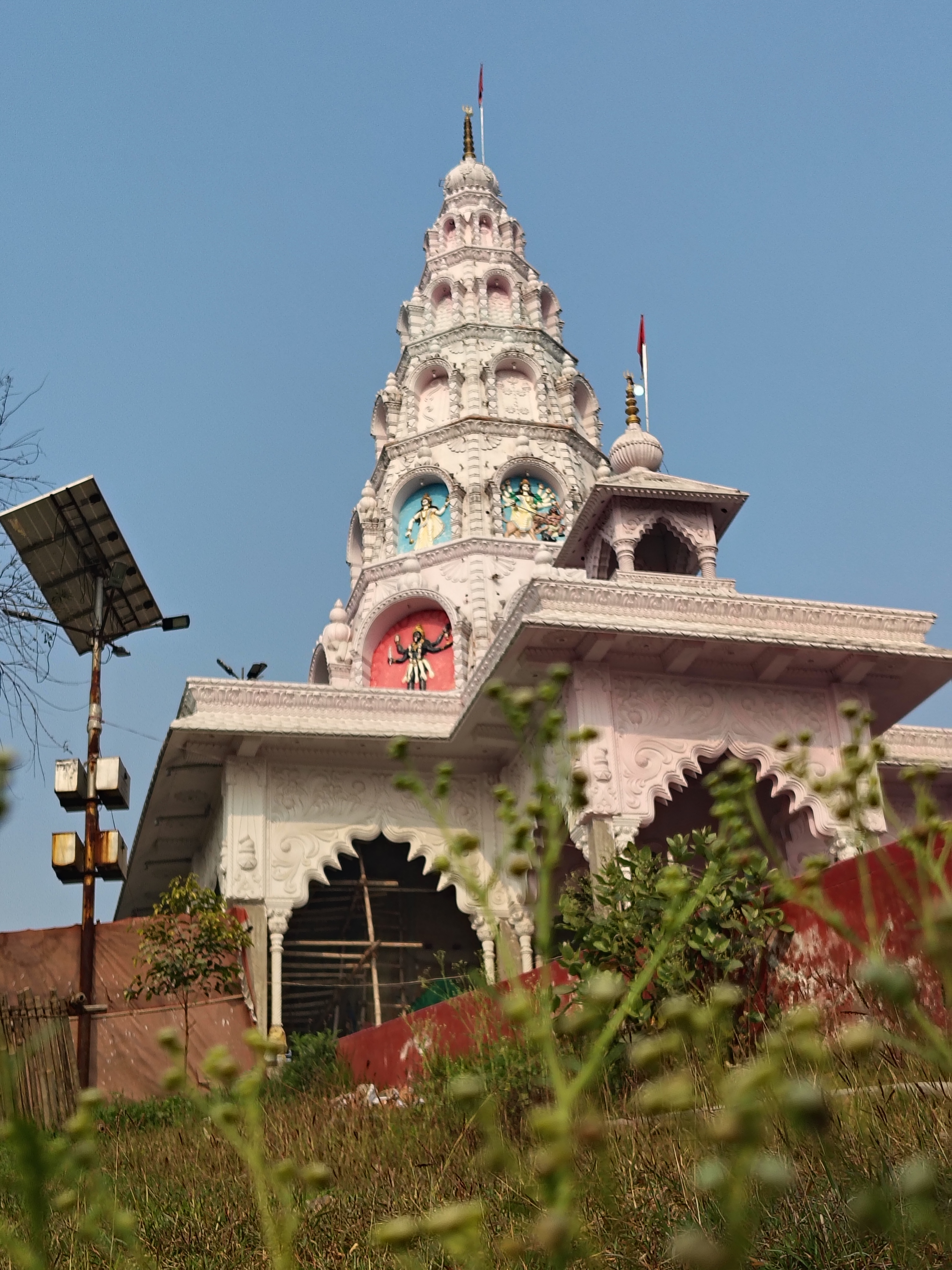
Top View of Maa Ratneshwari Temple
