= Jale, Bihar =

Town in Darbhanga, India

Jale Jalley
- Town
- Location in Bihar, India Jale (India)
- Coordinates: 26°22′48″N 85°43′12″E
- Country: India
- State: Bihar
- District: Darbhanga
- Block: Jale

Government
  - Type: Sarpanch

Area
  - Total: 18.67 km^{2} (7.21 sq mi)
- Elevation: 53 m (174 ft)

Population (2011)
  - Total: 37,256
  - Density: 1,996/km^{2} (5,168/sq mi)

Languages
  - Official: Hindi, Maithili
  - Other: Hindi, Maithili, Urdu, English
- Time zone: UTC+5:30 (IST)
- PIN: 847302
- Telephone code: 06276
- Vehicle registration: BR-07

Jale, or Jalley, is a town and the administrative center of Jale Block, Darbhanga District, Bihar, India. It is located to the north of Bagmati River, about 32 kilometres northwest of the district capital Darbhanga. The town was named after Jaleshwari sthan which is a pilgrimage site in rural area of Darbhanga. In the year 2011, it has a total population of 37,256.

== Geography ==
Jale is situated at the northwestern corner of Darbhanga District. It borders the village of Khesar to the north, the village of Pakkhauli to the east, the village of Latraha to the south, and the village of Dinanathpur to the west. The National Highway 527C passes through the town. Its average elevation is 53 metres above the sea level.

== Climate ==
Jale has a Humid Subtropical Climate. It gets the most precipitation in July, with 447 mm of average rainfall; and the least amount of precipitation in November, with 5 mm of average rainfall.

Climate data for Jale
| Month | Jan | Feb | Mar | Apr | May | Jun | Jul | Aug | Sep | Oct | Nov | Dec | Year |
|---|---|---|---|---|---|---|---|---|---|---|---|---|---|
| Mean daily maximum °C (°F) | 22.3 (72.1) | 26.2 (79.2) | 32.2 (90.0) | 36.3 (97.3) | 35.8 (96.4) | 34 (93) | 31.5 (88.7) | 31.6 (88.9) | 31 (88) | 30 (86) | 27.9 (82.2) | 24.1 (75.4) | 30.2 (86.4) |
| Daily mean °C (°F) | 16.2 (61.2) | 19.8 (67.6) | 25.4 (77.7) | 29.7 (85.5) | 30.2 (86.4) | 29.7 (85.5) | 28.3 (82.9) | 28.2 (82.8) | 27.5 (81.5) | 25.5 (77.9) | 22 (72) | 18 (64) | 25.0 (77.1) |
| Mean daily minimum °C (°F) | 10.5 (50.9) | 13.4 (56.1) | 18.2 (64.8) | 23 (73) | 24.9 (76.8) | 25.9 (78.6) | 25.8 (78.4) | 25.7 (78.3) | 24.8 (76.6) | 21.3 (70.3) | 16.3 (61.3) | 12.1 (53.8) | 20.2 (68.2) |
| Average rainfall mm (inches) | 13 (0.5) | 19 (0.7) | 16 (0.6) | 38 (1.5) | 119 (4.7) | 284 (11.2) | 447 (17.6) | 373 (14.7) | 314 (12.4) | 79 (3.1) | 5 (0.2) | 7 (0.3) | 1,714 (67.5) |
Source: Climate-Data.org

== Demographics ==
As of the 2001 India census, Jale has a population of 37,256. Males constitute 19,222 of the population and females 18,034. Jale has an average literacy rate of 54.90%, which is less than the Bihar average of 61.80%. Male literacy is 63.33% and female literacy is 45.87%. In Jalle, 19.53% of the population is under 6 years of age.

== Places to visit ==
- Ahilya Asthan - It is famous historical temple, situated about 3.2 kilometres south of Kamtaul Railway Station.
- Gautam Ashram - Gautam Ashram (Sanskrit: गौतम आश्रम) was a gurukul of the ancient Indian philosopher Gautama. It is located at the west bank of Khiroi river in Brahmpur village of Jale block of Darbhanga district in Bihar. It is only at a 7.0 kilometres distance from Kamtaul railway station.
