= Sitamarhi–Jaynagar–Nirmali line (via Sursand) =

Proposed Railway Line in Bihar, India

Overview
- Status: Proposed
- Owner: Indian Railways
- Termini: Sitamarhi; Nirmali

Technical
- Route availability: Under Proposal

Sitamarhi-Jaynagar-Nirmali Via Sursand Railway Line is a proposed railway line in East Central Railway zone by Indian Railway. It was announced by Former Railway Minister Lalu Prasad Yadav in 2007. He laid the foundation inauguration of this proposed railway line at Sursand on 5 January 2008. Its length is 188.9 km. Due to negligence of the government, this railway line has yet not completed in the past 16 years. In 2022, the member of parliament and BJP leader Ashok Kumar Yadav from the Madhubani Lok Sabha constituency wrote a letter to the union minister of Indian Railway Aswani Vaishnav for the completion of the proposed railway as soon as possible. The union minister Ashwini Vaishnav has assured that the project will start soon. According to the railway ministry 345 acres of land is required for acquisition. There are some issues with the acquisition of the land. This railway line will connect two districts of Bihar from Sitamarhi to Nirmali (Madhubani) via Sursand, Bhitthamore and Jaynagar. It also connects border areas of Nepal near Sitamarhi and Madhubani districts of Bihar. The cost of the project was estimated Rs. 2,821 in 2007, but due to the delay in starting the project, the estimated cost of the project is around Rs. 10,000 crores in 2022. The Indian union railway ministry has assured that the project will start soon.

== Description ==
About 80 km of the railway line falls in the Sitamarhi district and the remaining railway line falls in the areas of Nirmali and Jaynagar in the Madhubani district of Mithila region in Bihar, India. The proposed railway station in the Sitamarhi district are Bhairokothi, Bariarpur, Bathnaha, Lattipur, Digghi, Gonahi, Bela, Parsa, Dostia, Chilra, Hariharpur, Dalkawa, Bhutahi, Sonbarsa, Rajbara, Pakdia, Naranga, Parihar, Masaha, Banauli, Sursand, Bhittamod and Choraut. Similarly Nirmali and Jaynagar are prominent railway stations in the Madhubani district. In the Madhubani district, many new stations and halts including Umgaon, Lalmani, Laukahi, Laukhaha will be constructed from Nirmali. After the completion of the project, the Nirmali railway station will get the status of "Junction". There will be a total of 25 stations in this railway line, in which apart from 4 old stations, 21 new stations will be constructed. This proposed railway line will improve transportation facilities for the people of four Lok Sabha constituencies of the Mithila region - Sitamarhi, Madhubani, Jhanjharpur and Supaul.

== Further work ==
The acquisition of land for the project has yet not completed even after 16 years of the inception of the project. The development of this project is very slow due to unavailability of funds to the project. According to the former members of the Railway Advisory Committee, Suresh Chandra Chaudhary and Vishnudev Bhandari, the people of the border areas were hopeful that in the Railway Budget 2023, sufficient funds would be provided for the proposed Sitamarhi-Jaynagar-Nirmali railway line. The budget in 2023 of Indian Railway has allotted only thousand rupees to this proposed railway line so that the project will not closed. As of March 2022, only Rs 3.20 crore has been spent on this project. According to the RTI information given by the Railway Board, this project has also been suspended for the further notice along with 17 railway infrastructure projects among 52 ongoing railway infrastructure projects in Bihar.

On 8 August 2025 at the occasion of laying down foundation stone for the grand reconstruction project Janaki Janmasthali Mandir of the Punaura Dham premises in Sitamarhi, the Union Home Minister Amit Shah announced a budget of Rs 2400 crore for building the Sitamarhi-Sursand-Jaynagar-Nirmali railway section. On 1 October 2025, the JDU executive president Sanjay Jha announced through his social media platform that the Union government of India has granted approval for the construction of the proposed Sitamarhi-Sursand-Jaynagar-Nirmali railway line. Further he expressed his gratitude to the Railway Minister Ashwini Vaishnav, Prime Minister Narendra Modi and Chief Minister Nitish Kumar for granting the approval. The project was granted approval by the initiative of Bihar's Energy Minister Bijendra Prasad Yadav. After receiving the departmental approval, the people of the Kosi region, and the central Mithila region have received significant relief. It is a long-pending railway project in the region of Mithila in India.

== Importance ==
The project of Sitamarhi - Sursand - Jaynagar - Nirmali railway line holds historical significance for the people of Mithila. It is expected that its completion would significantly improve the region's connectivity. It will make transportation easier. From this railway project in the Mithila region trade and tourism will also get a new impetus. It will help in promoting the cultural heritage of Mithila and enhance the tourism in Mithila.

According to experts, the construction of this railway line will save time and money of the passengers in the region and will also give a boost to the local market, industries and economy. People in the region are considering it a historic step towards the development of the region. It will further strengthen the ties of Roti-Beti relation between the two culturally tied nations of India and Nepal.
