= Tourism in Mithila =

Indian regional tourism

The region of Mithila in the Indian subcontinent is believed to be the ancient inhabitat place of the Videha Kingdom in the text Ramayana. The Mithila region is widely known for its rich culture, tradition and historical heritages. The region encompasses parts of Bihar, Jharkhand, and Nepal. The major parts of the tourism in the Mithila region are religious, historical, cultural, art and some natural locations.

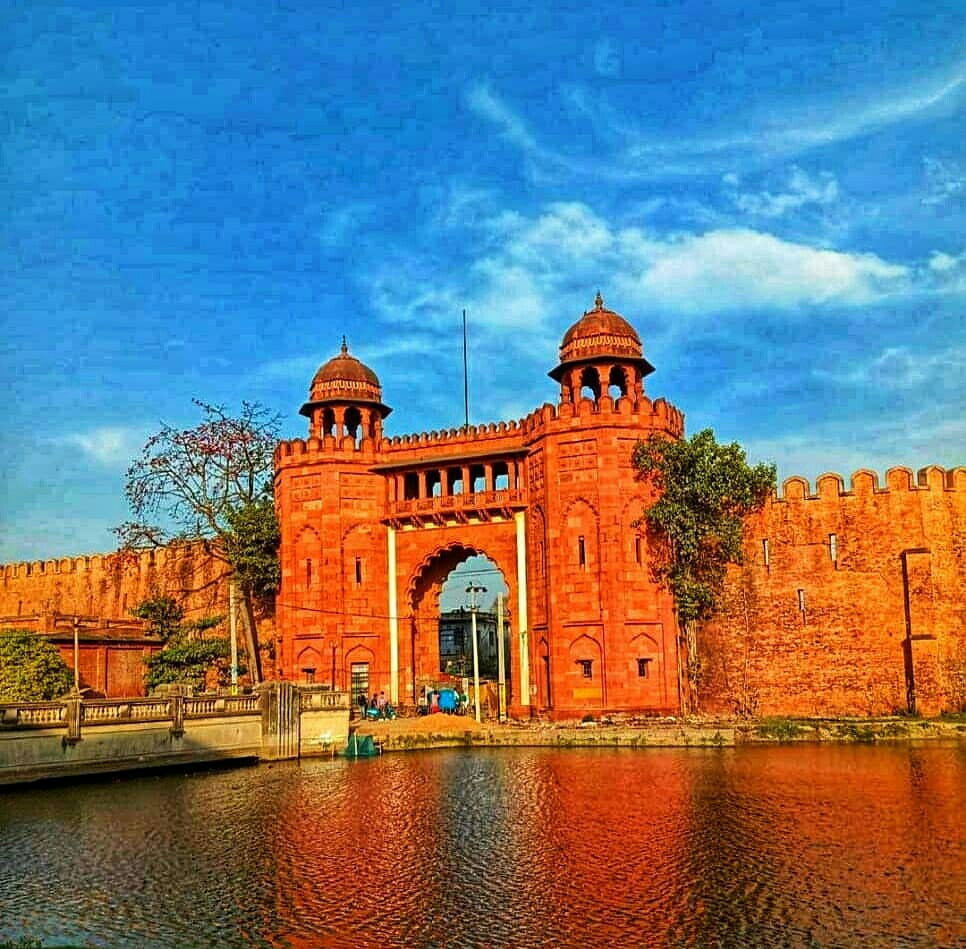
Darbhanga Raj Fort

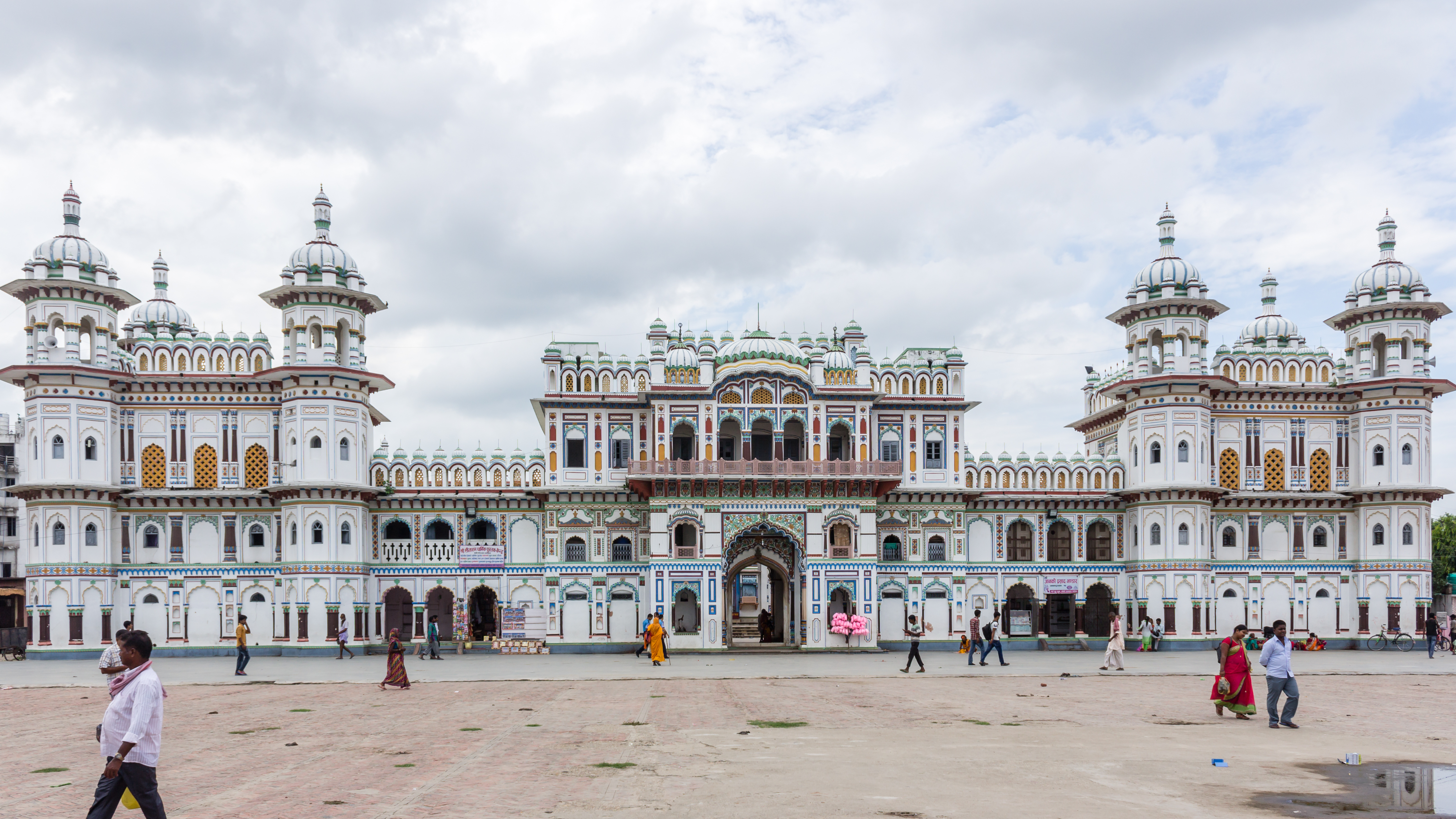
Janaki Mandir, Janakpur

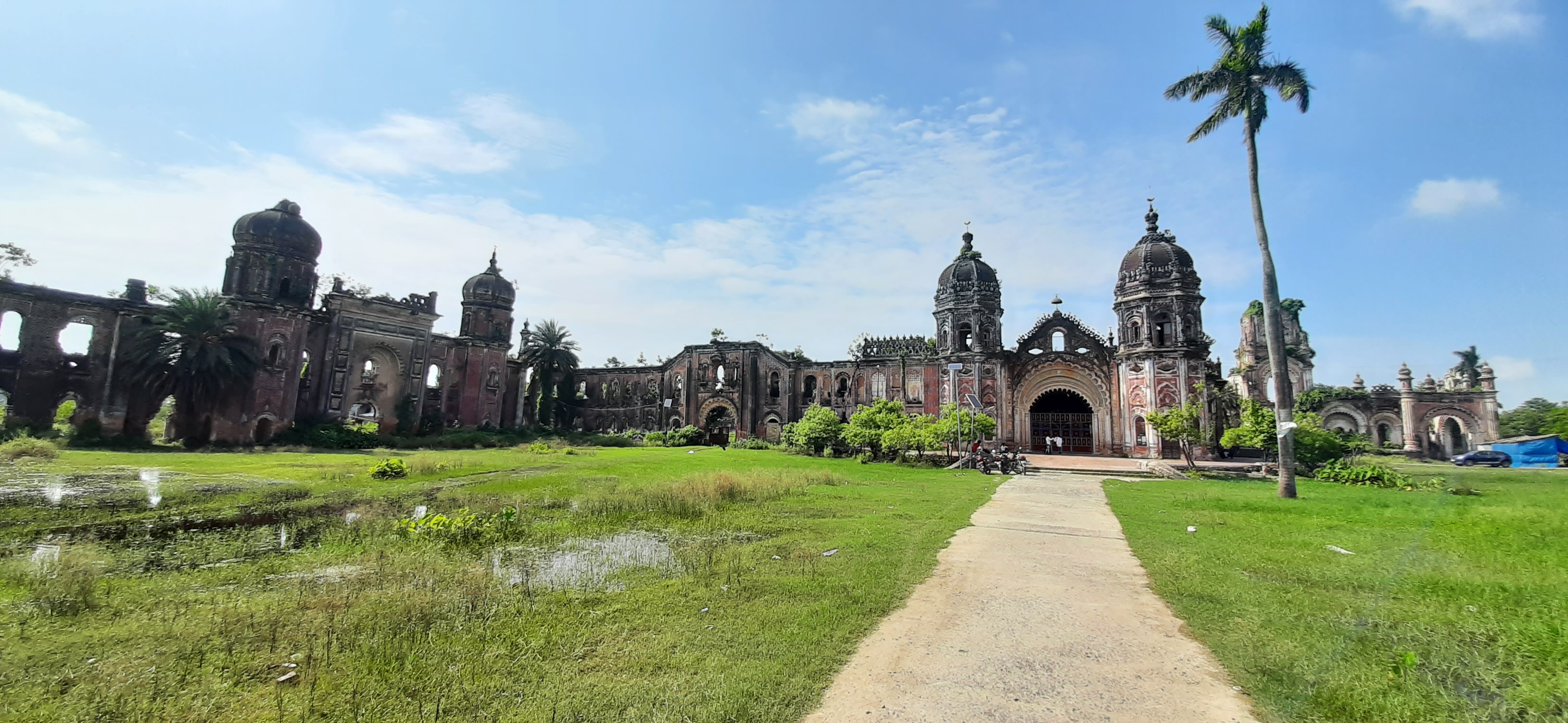
Ruins of Rajnagar Palace, Madhubani

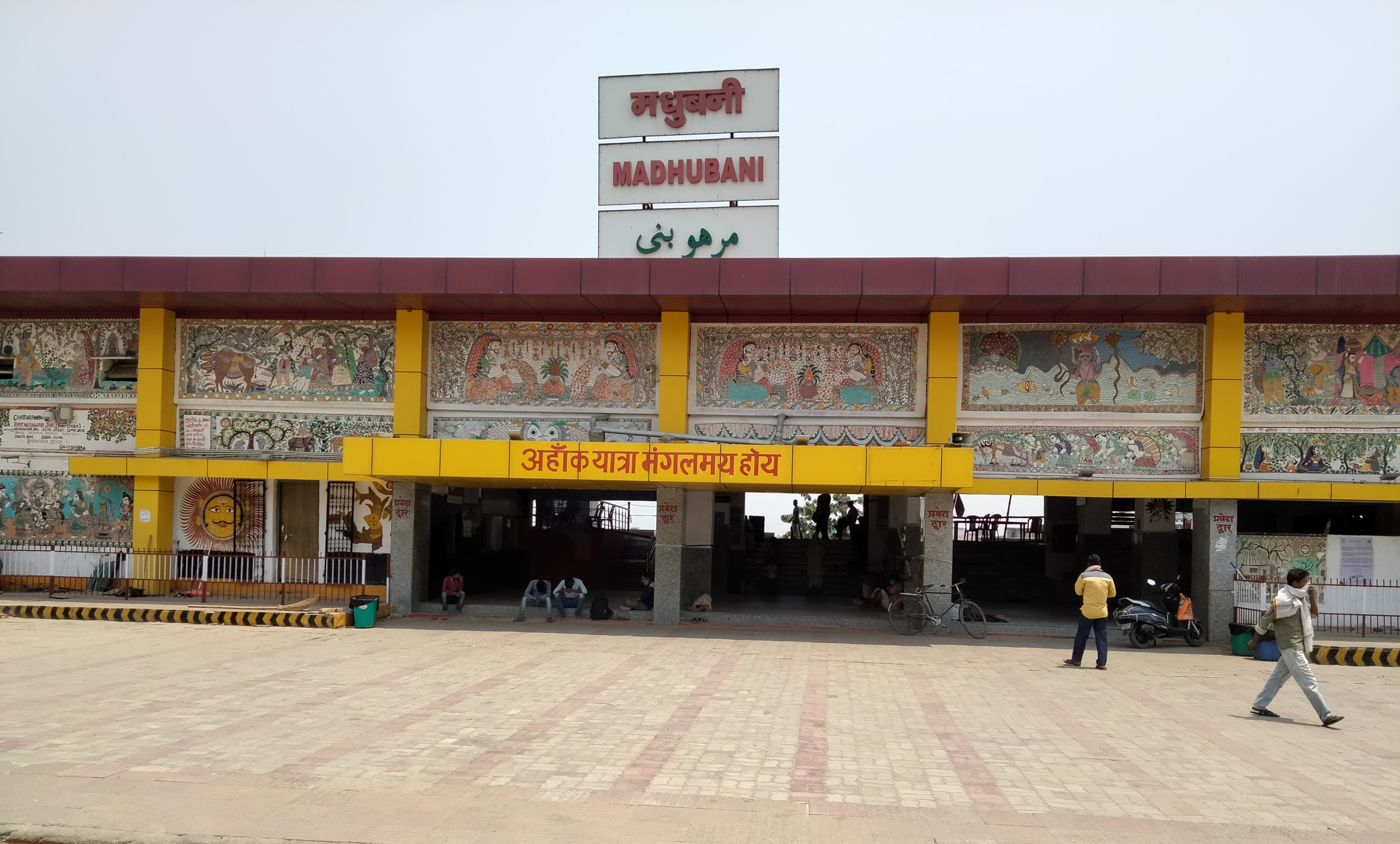
Madhubani paintings also known as Mithila paintings on the wall of Madhubani Railway Station.

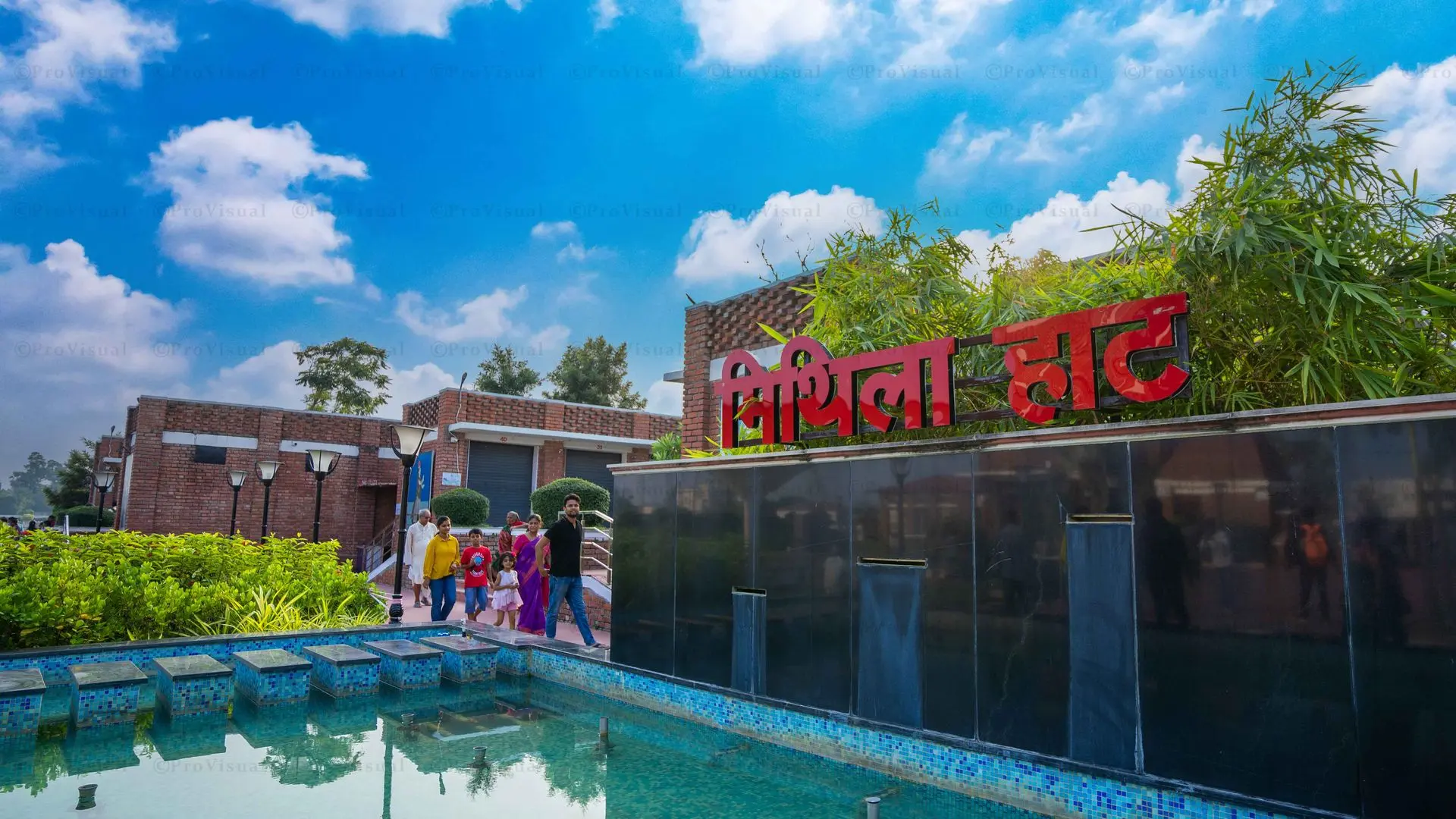
Mithila Haat, a Mithila Cultural Centre

According to Ramayana, the kingdom of Mithila was ruled by the Vedic King Janaka. The King Janaka is considered one of prominent figures in the ancient texts of the Indian subcontinent. He was the father of the Goddess Sita in Ramayana. The goddess Sita was the wife of Lord Rama. Mithila is considered as a holy destination for the Hindu pilgrimage as it is believed to be the birthplace of the goddess Sita. The Indian poet Goswami Tulsidas in his book Ramacharitmanas and the Vedic sage Maharshi Valmiki in his book Ramayana have described the land of Mithila as a holy land. It is the part of the Ramayana circuit being developed by the Government of India.

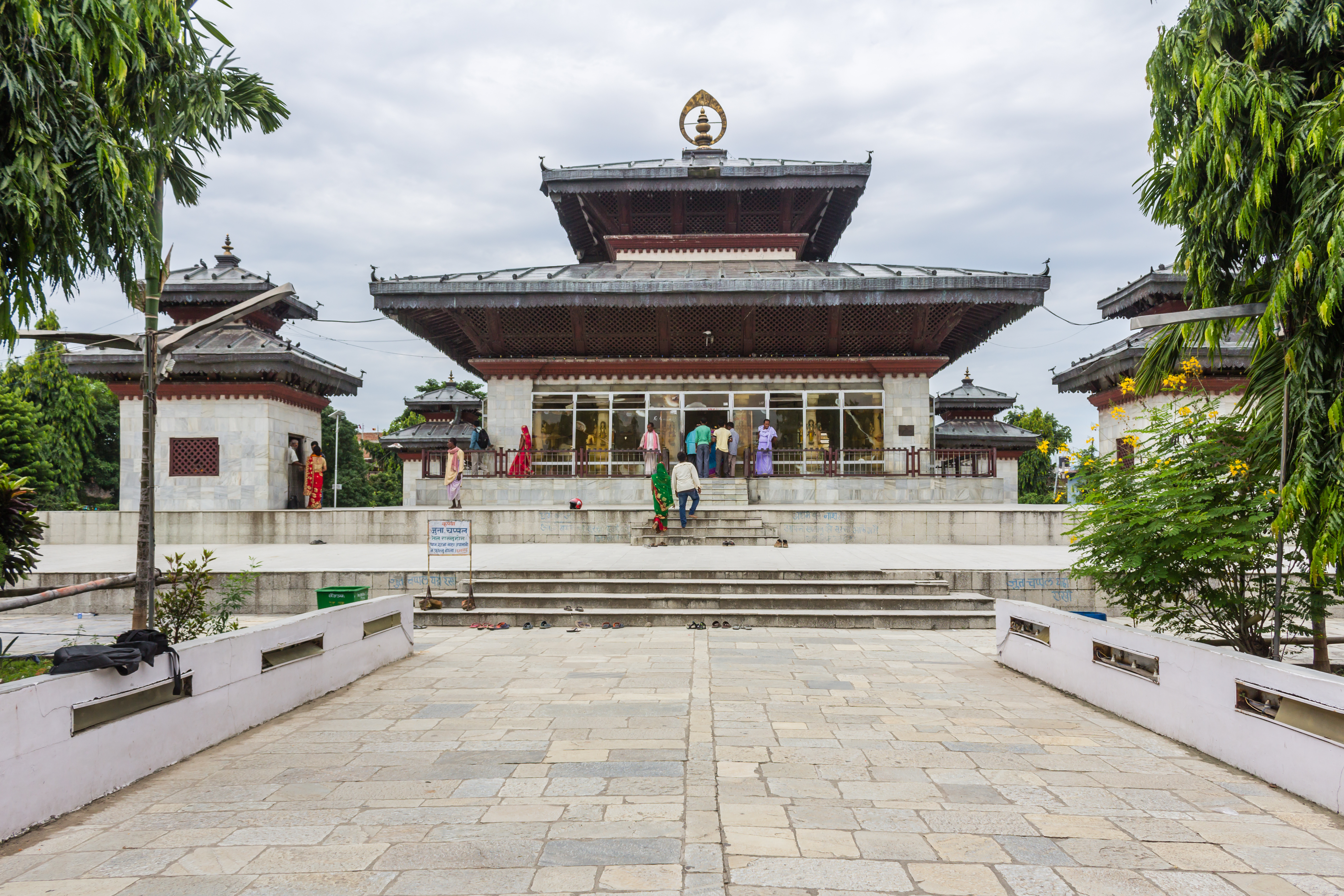
Magnificent view of Vivah Mandap in Janakpur Dham

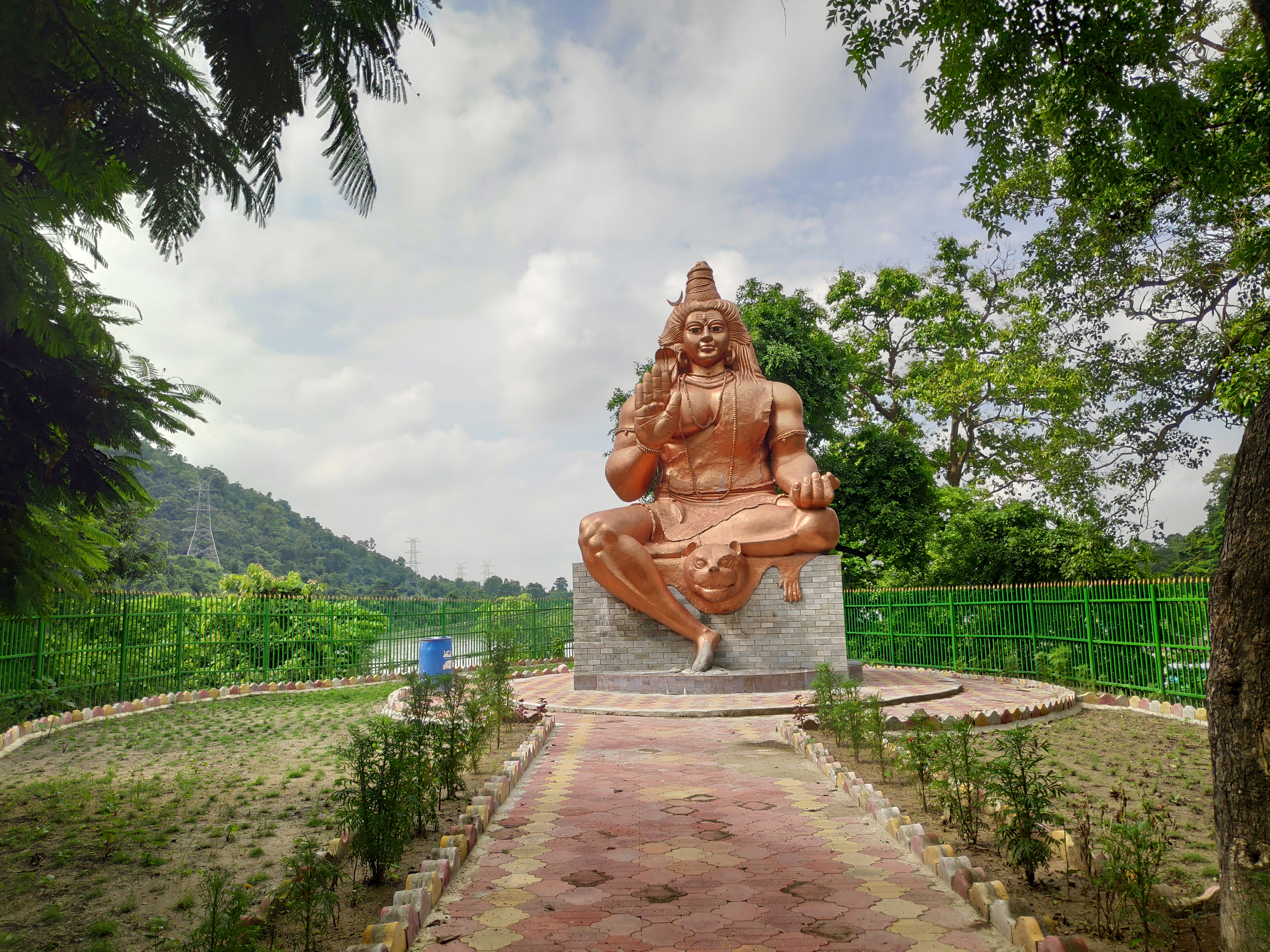
Nunthardham, Rautahat District

== Religious tourism ==
Sitamarhi is a major destination in the Mithila region for religious tourism. According to Hindu adherents, Sitamarhi is believed as the birthplace of the Goddess Sita. There are several locations related to the Ramayana circuit in the Sitamarhi district. Panaura Dham in Sitamarhi is the place of manifestation of Goddess Sita.

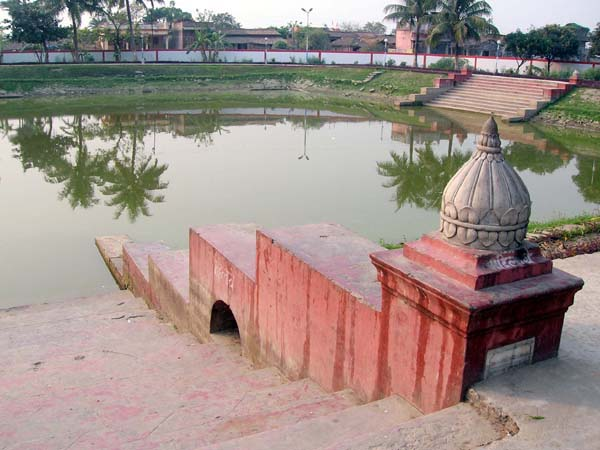
Janaki Kund also known as Sita Kund which believed to be the location of the birthplace of Goddess Sita at Punauradham in Sitamarhi.

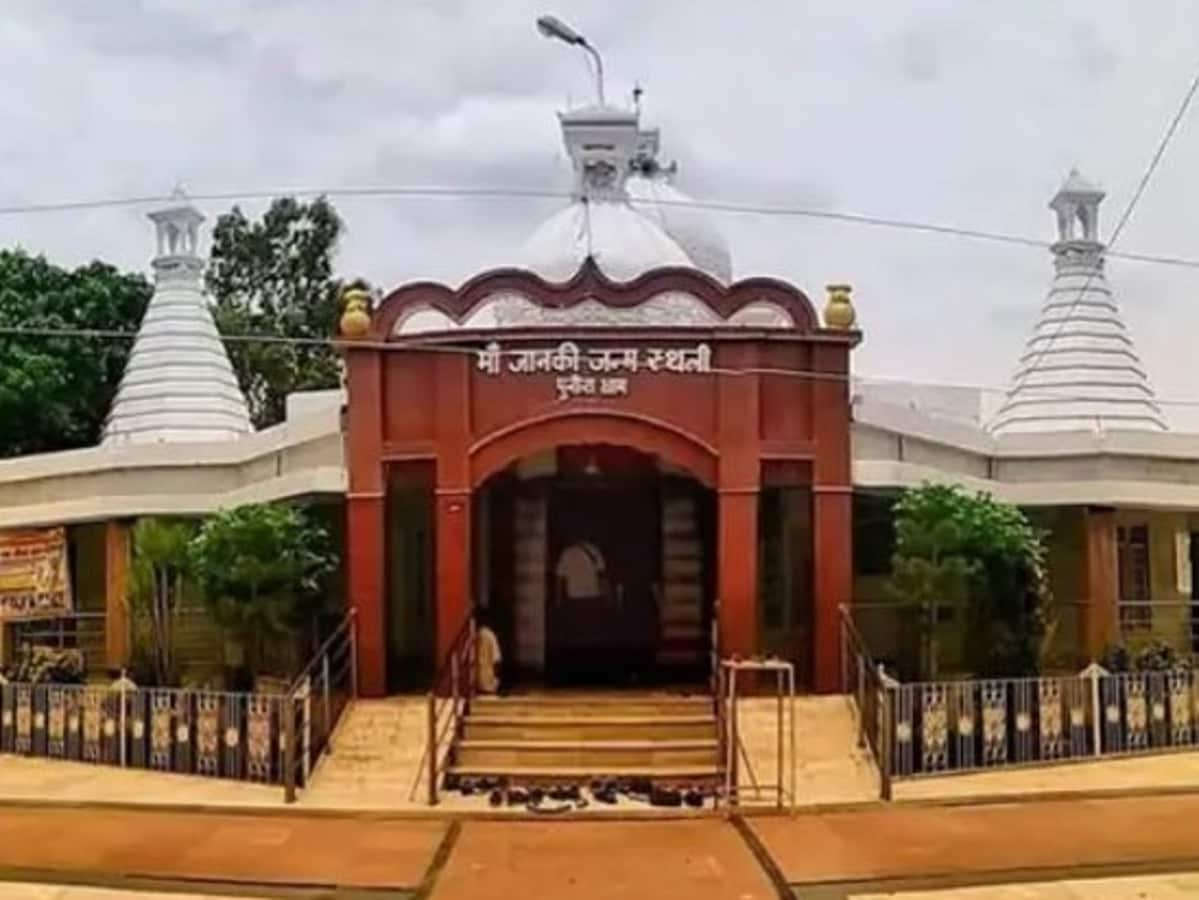
The ancient temple of Janaki Janmabhoomi at Punaura Dham in the Sitamarhi district of the Mithila region

Similarly there is another location called as Janaki Sthan related to the temple of Goddess Sita in the city of Sitamarhi. The temple is known as Janaki Sthan Mandir. In the campus of Janaki Sthan, there is a sacred pond called as Urvija Kund. Some scholars believe this sacred pond as the place of manifestation of Goddess Sita.

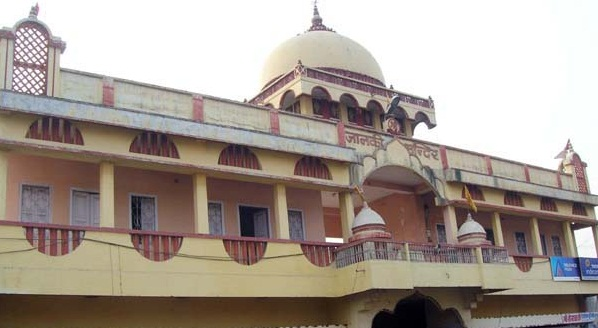
Janaki Sthan Mandir

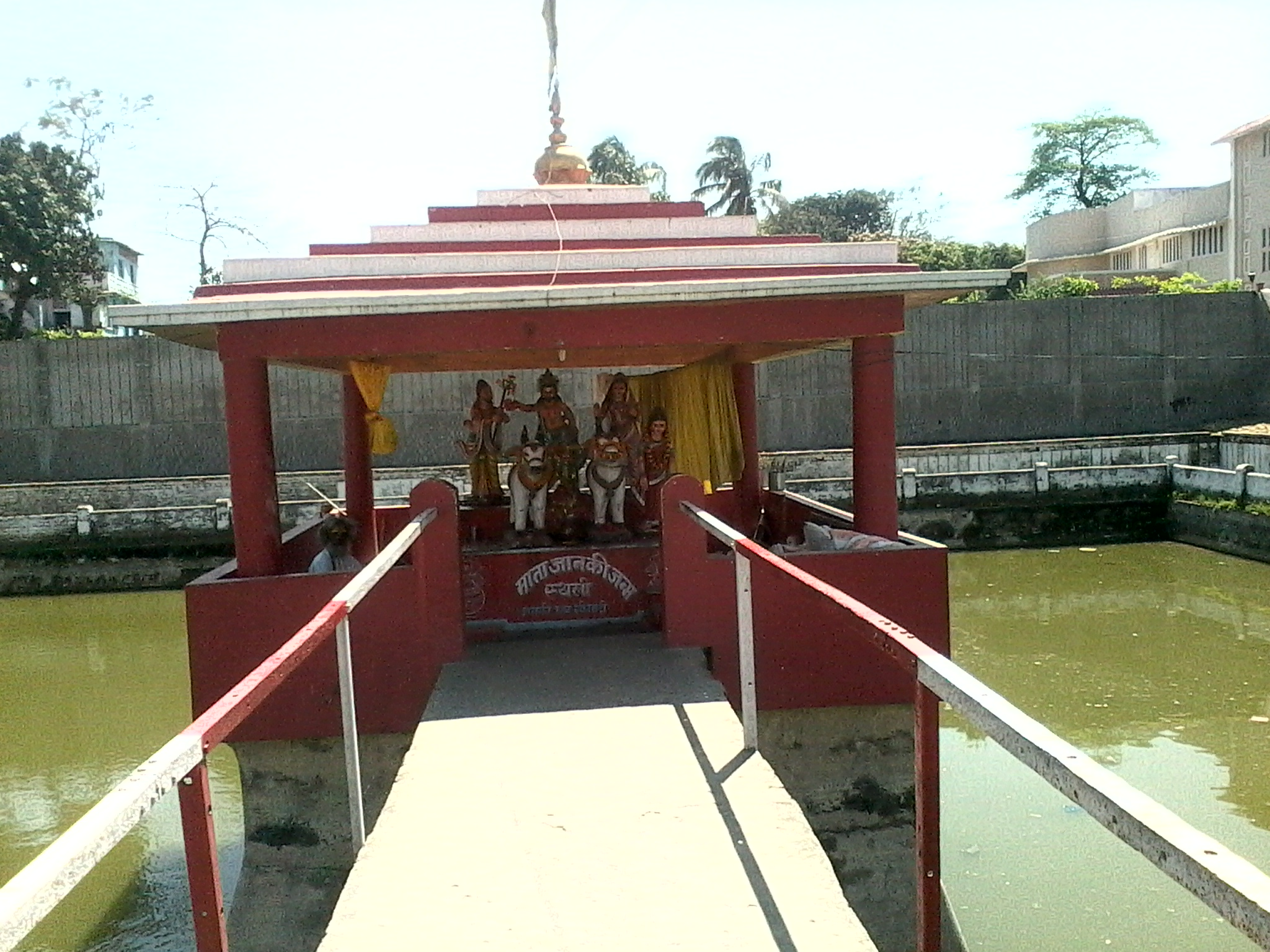
Urvija Kund at Janaki Sthan in the city of Sitamarhi.

After the city of Sitamarhi, the other major destination for the tourism in Mithila is the city of Janakpur. In the present time, it is the capital city of the Madhesh Pradesh province in Nepal. It is believed to be the capital of the ancient Mithila Kingdom in Ramayana. It was the location of the court of King Janaka in Mithila. The world famous Janaki Mandir is the prime location in the city of Janakpur. In 2008, it was placed in the tentative list of the UNESCO World Heritage Sites.

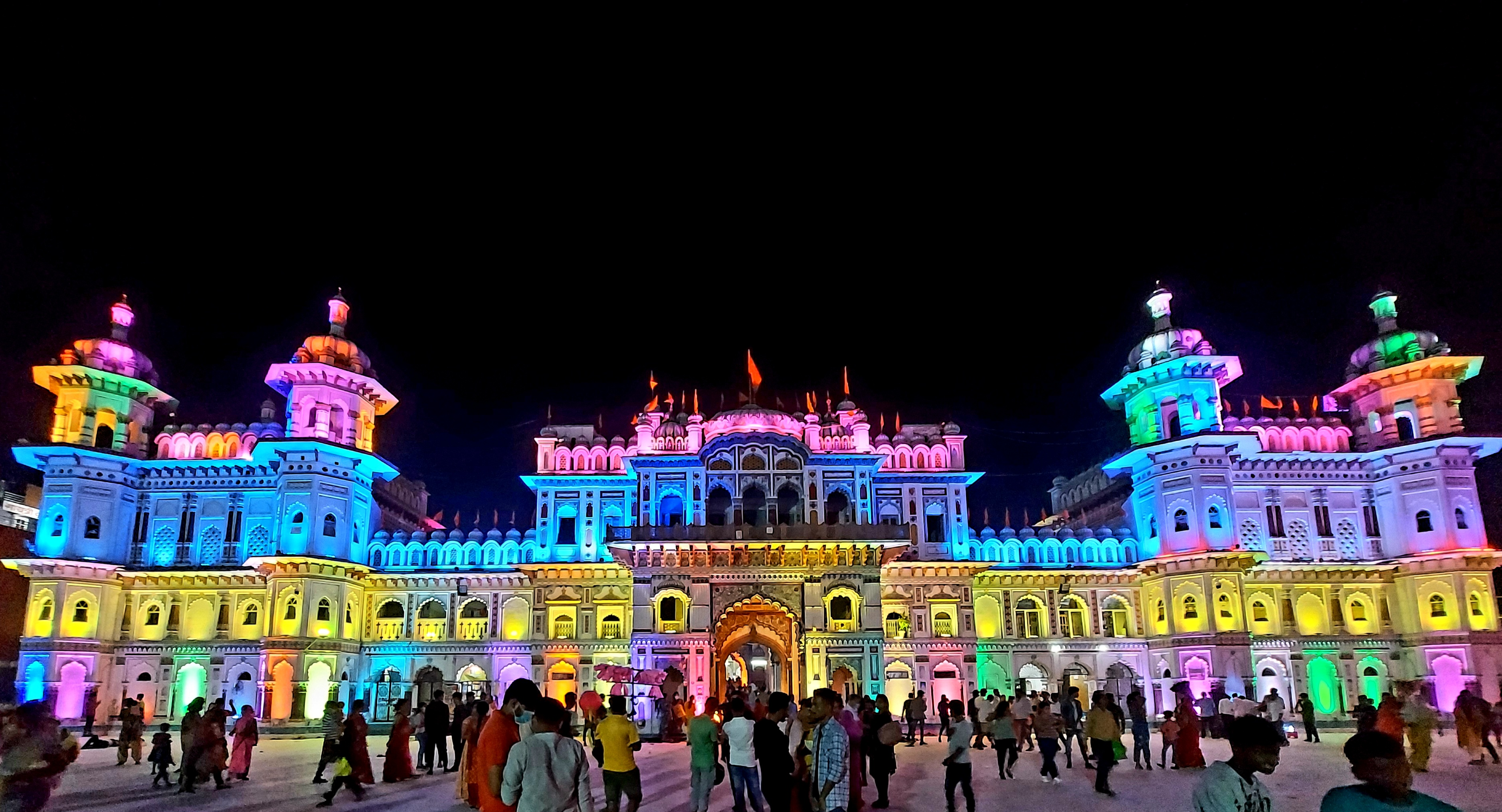
Night view of Janaki Mandir in Janakpur.

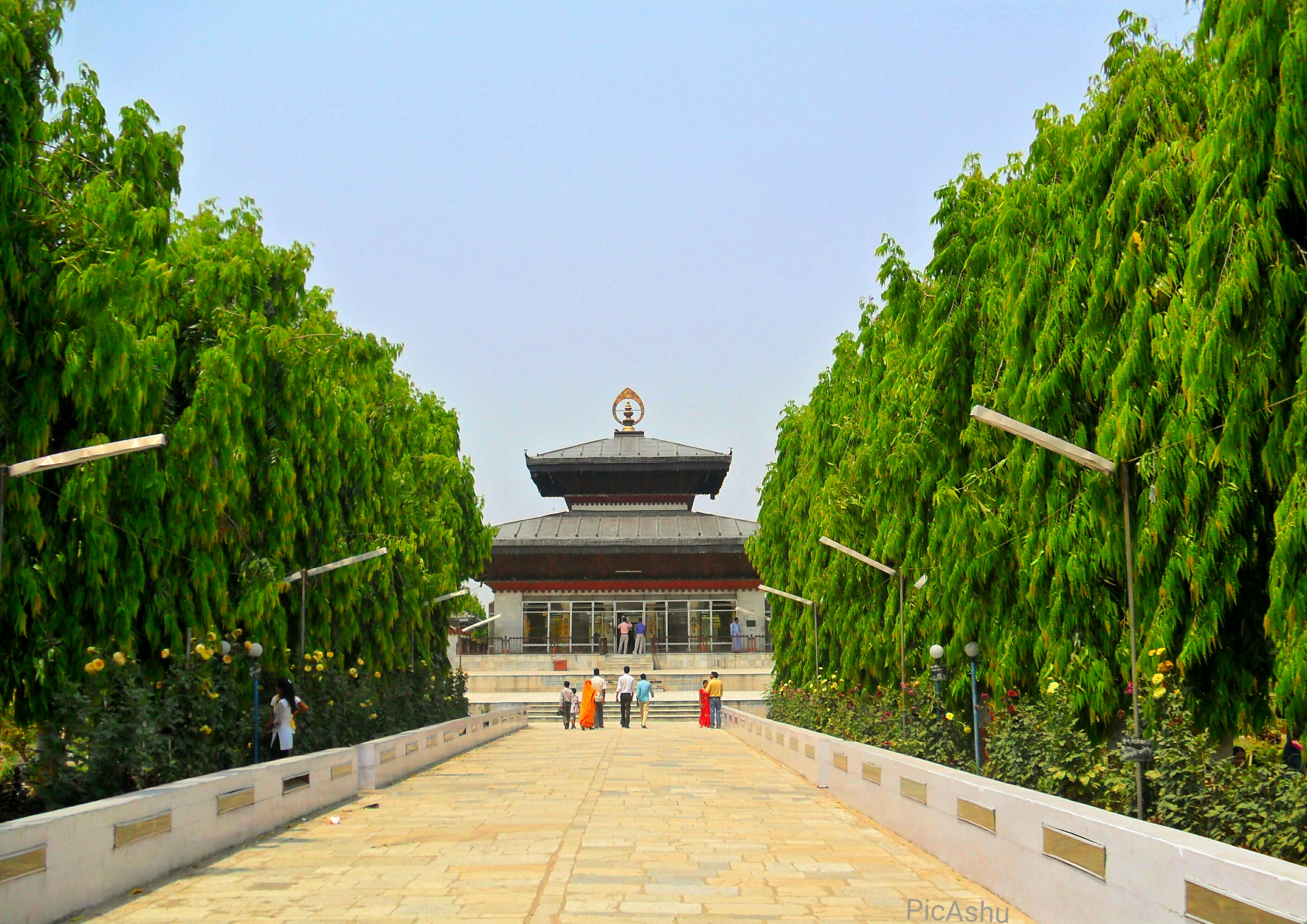
Vivah Mandap adjacent to the Janaki Mandir

Ram Mandir is one of the oldest Hindu temple in city of Janakpur which was built by the Gorkhali Army General Amar Singh Thapa during 1700. It is constructed in the style of Nepalese architectural design.

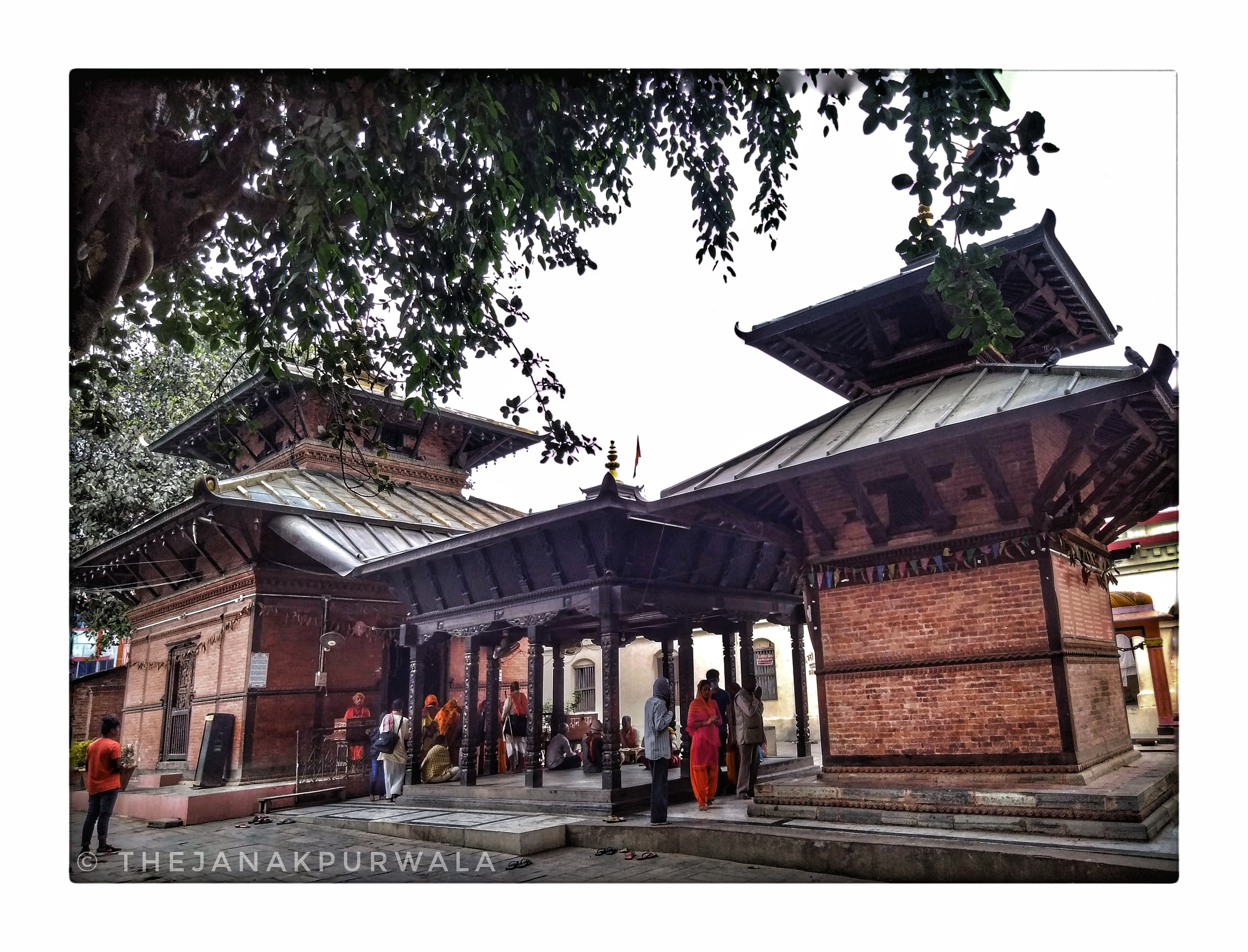
Historical Ram Mandir in Janakpur

In Darbhanga district, the Ahalya Sthan and the Gautam Ashram are the major destinations for Hindu pilgrimage. The Gautam Ashram was the ashram of the Vedic sage Maharshi Gautama. It was associated with the Ancient Mithila University. It is the place where the Indian philosophy of Nyaya Shastra was composed. It was one of the sacred locations in the path of the journey of Lord Rama towards the kingdom of Mithila. Similarly the Ahalya Sthan is the sacred location in the ashram where it is believed that Ahalya was converted into a hard stone statue due to the curse given by her husband Maharshi Gautama. It is believed that when Lord Rama arrived in the ashram, he freed Ahalya from the curse given by Maharshi Gautama.

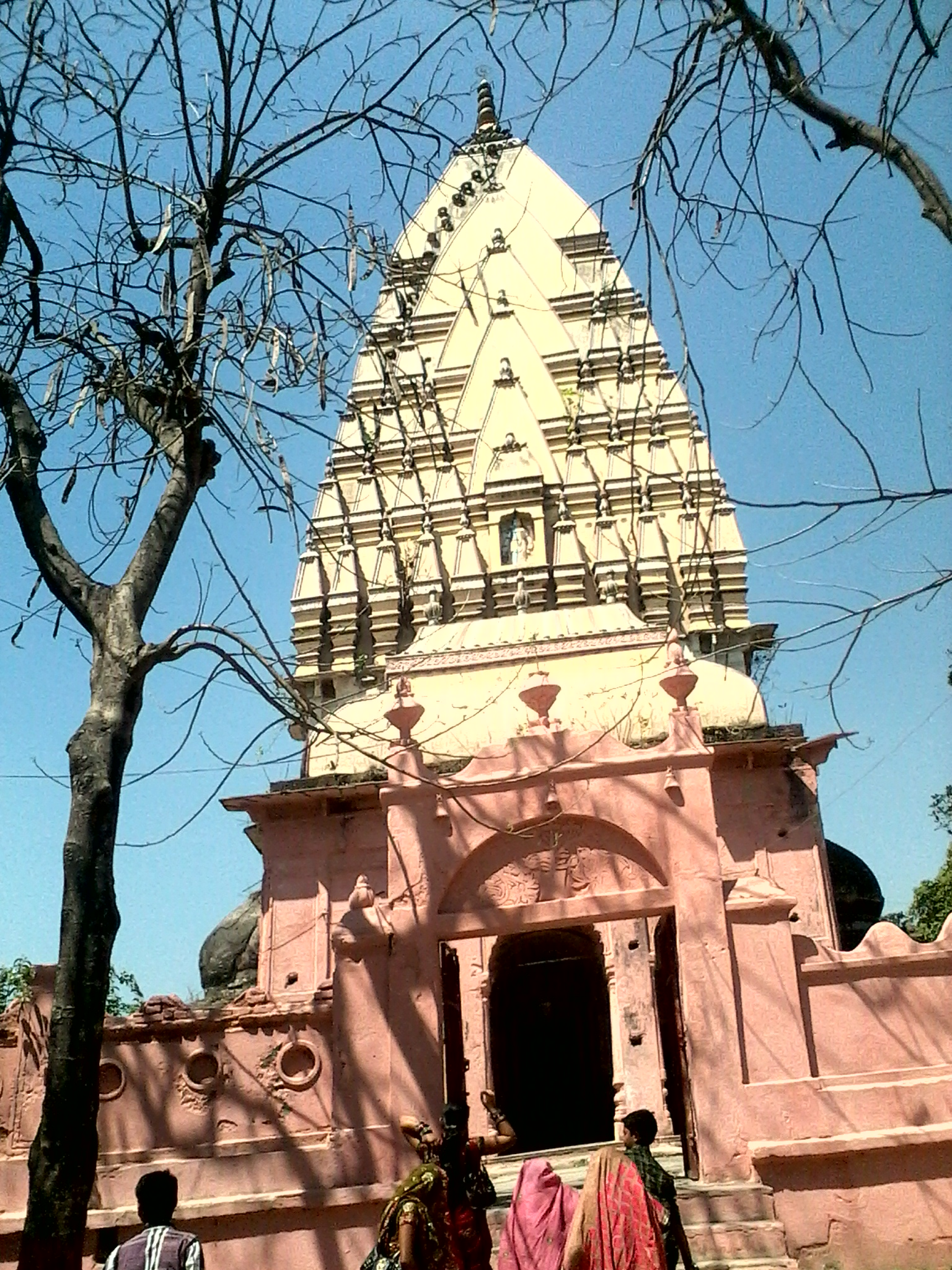
Ram Janaki Mandir at Ahalya Sthan in Darbhanga district

In the Mithila region, a religious circumambulation of fifteen days known as Mithila Madhya Parikrama is an ancient and traditional source of tourism in Mithila. The circumambulation covers 15 major pilgrims sites of the central part of the Mithila region. In the fifteen days journey of the Mithila Madhya Parikrama, lakhs of devotees, sadhu-sants and travellers flocked from different parts of the Indian subcontinent to participate.

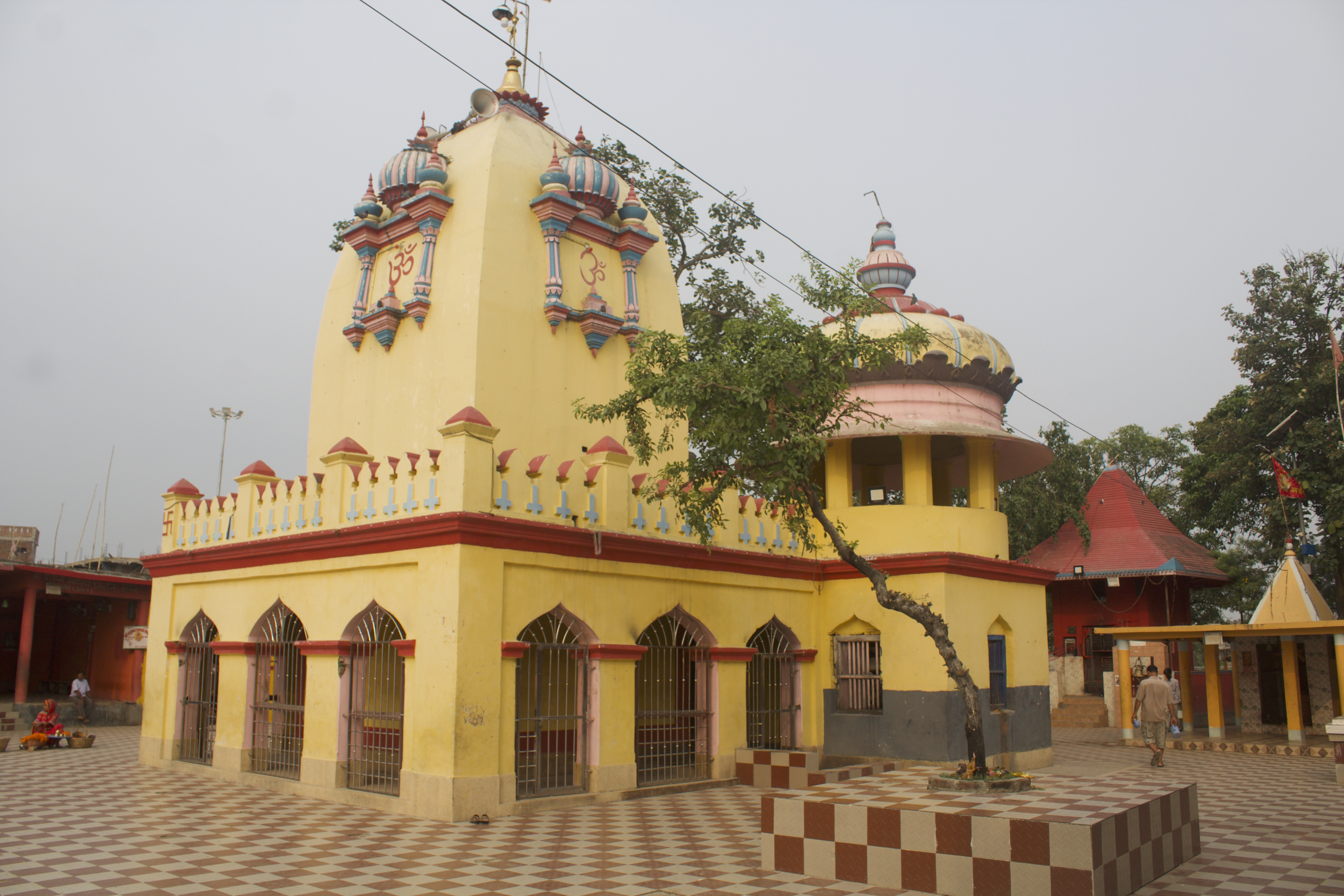
Jaleshwarnath Mahadev Mandir believed to be built by the King Janaka of Mithila. It is an important pilgrims site in the path of the Mithila Madhya Parikrama.

In the Madhubani district, there is a legendary village called Phulhar believed to be the place where Lord Rama and Goddess Sita first time met in their lives. According to legend, it is said that Goddess Sita used to come here at the temple Girija Sthan for worshiping her family kuldevi Goddess Girija in Ramayana. There is a flower garden known as Bagh Tarag Pushpavatika in the village. It is believed that Lord Rama and Lakshmana came here in the garden to pluck some flowers for their Guru Vishwamitra during their journey in the kingdom of Mithila. It is mentioned at Doha number 227 in Bal Kand of Ramayana composed by the Awadhi poet Tulsidas. It has been recognised as a religious tourist destination by the Government of Bihar for Hindu pilgrimage in the Ramayana circuit.

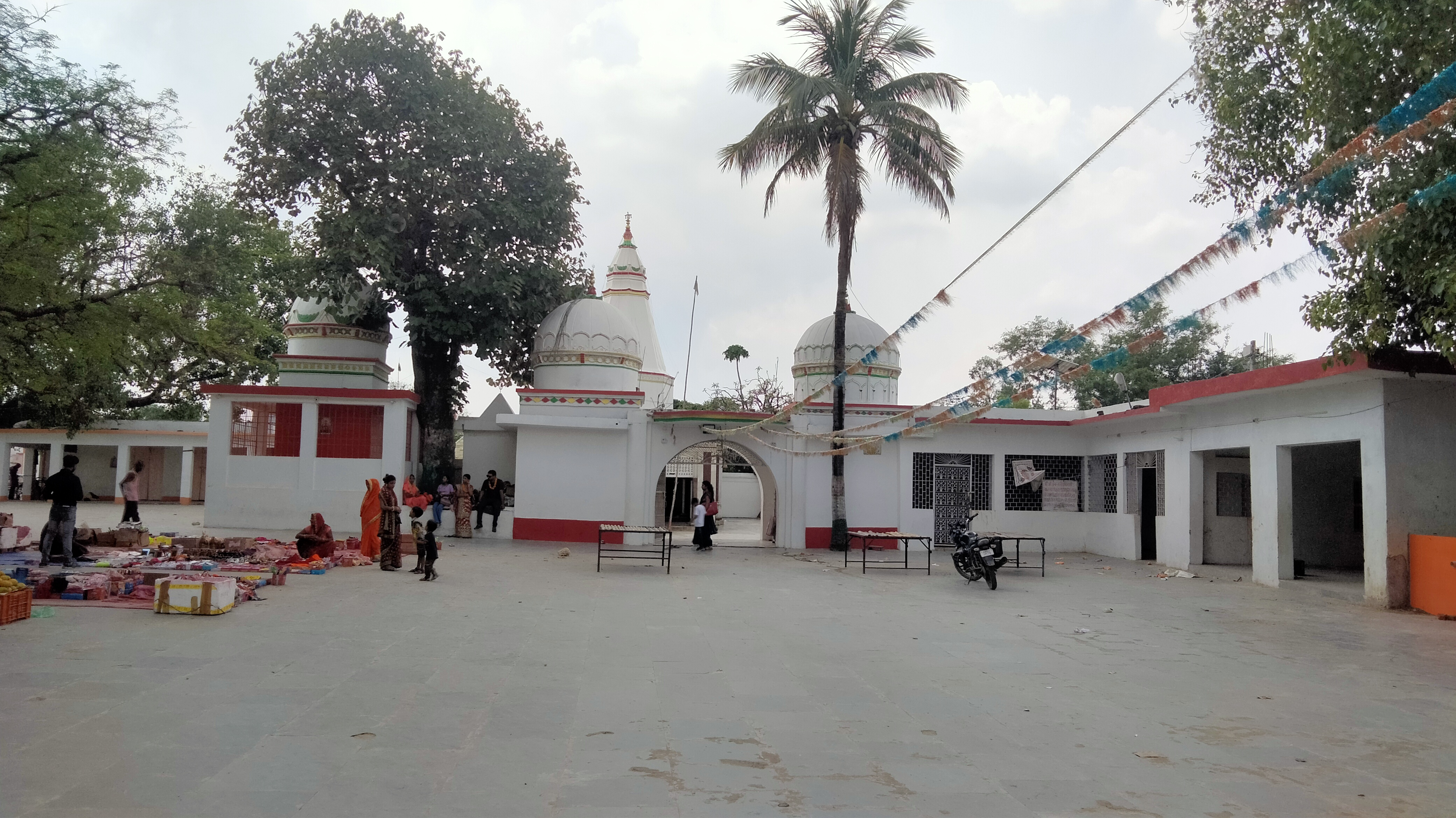
Girija Sthan Mandir complex at Phulhar

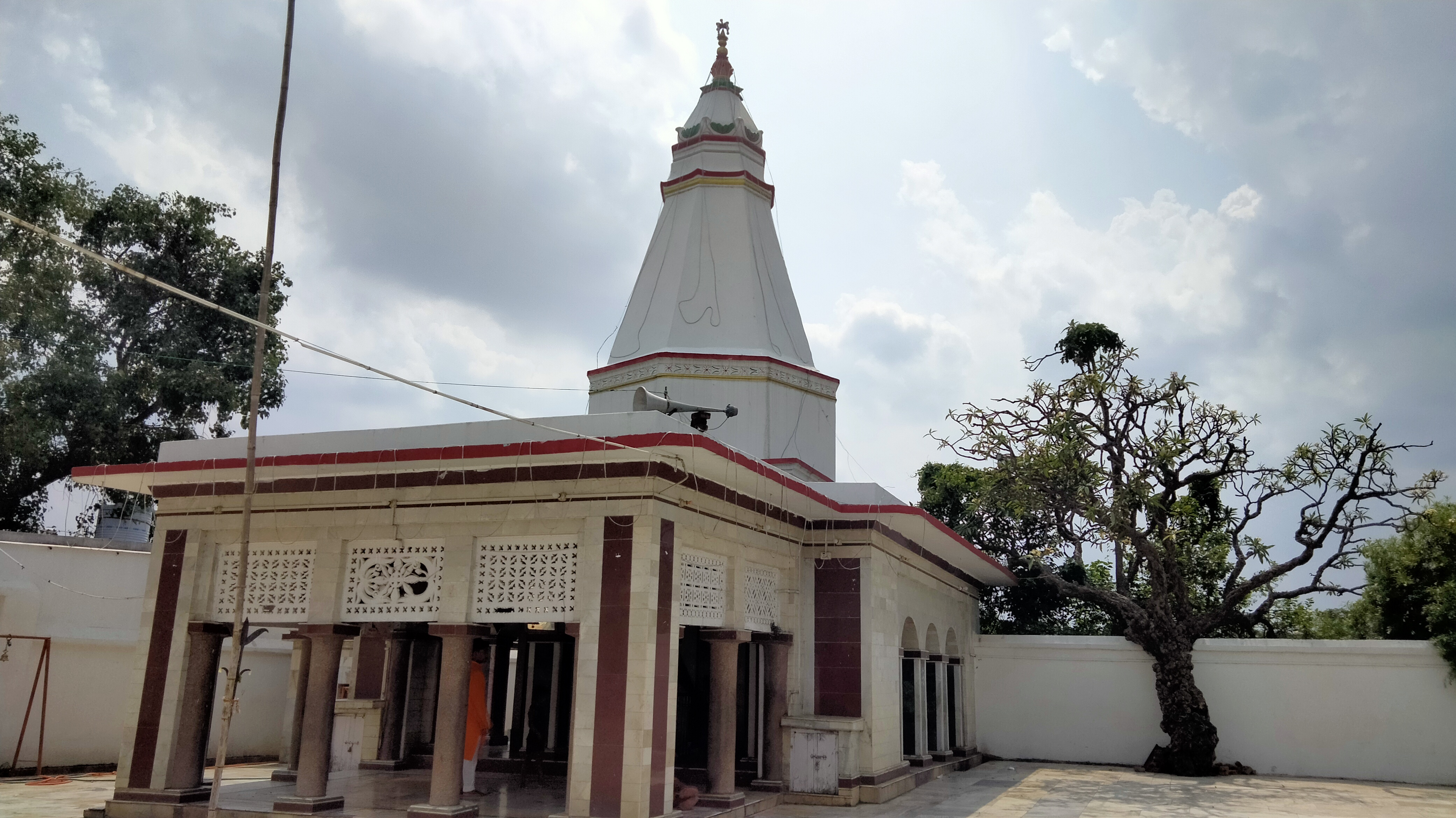
Girija Devi Mandir related to Ramayana

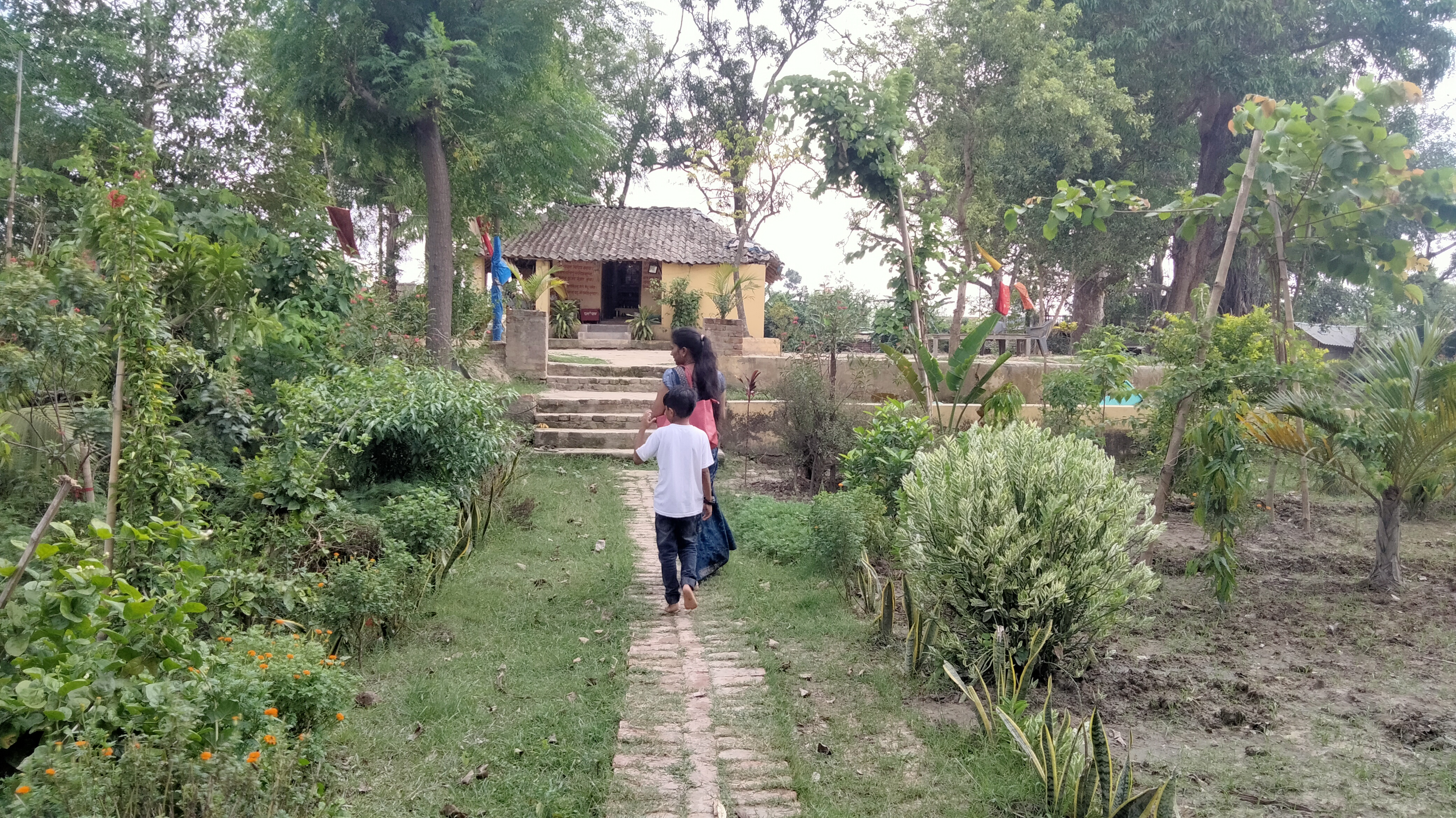
View of the Prabhu Shree Sitaramji Pratham Milan Mandir at the divine garden Baag Taraag Pushpavatika in the Phulhar village believed to the legendary garden where prince Rama and princess Sita first time met before the ceremony of Sita Swayamvara in Ramayana

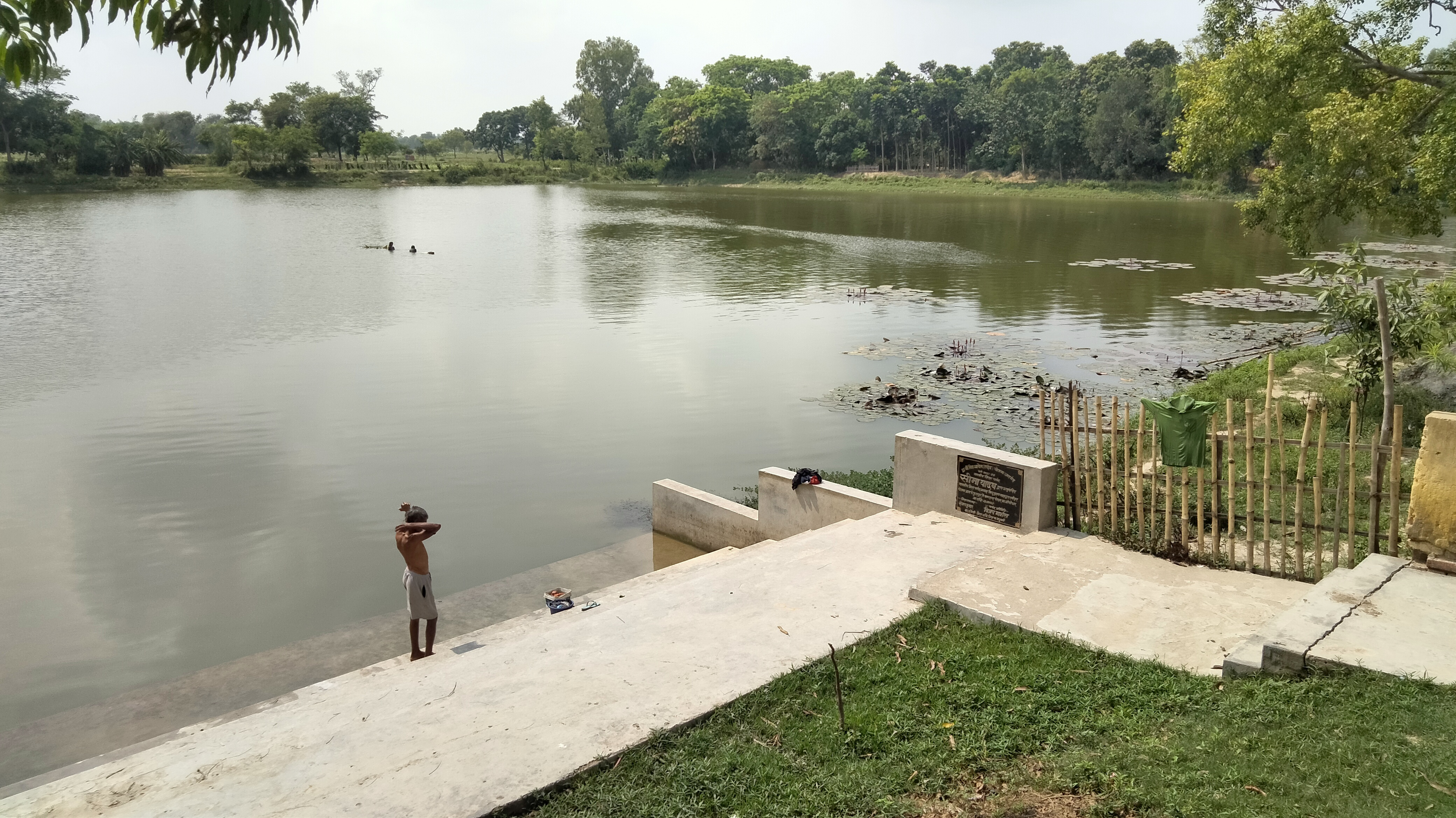
View of the legendary lake Baag Taraag Sarovar

The Simaria Ghat on the bank of Ganga river in the Begusarai district of the Mithila region is an important religious destination of Hindu adherents for sacred Ganga Snaana. It is known for performing Hindu rituals of a month-long Kalpavas. According to legend, it is believed that the tradition of the month-long Kalpavas Mela was started by the King Janaka of Mithila. The Kalpavas Mela and Ganga Snaana tradition of Hinduism attract a huge number of devotees from different parts of the Indian subcontinent including Nepal and Bhutan.

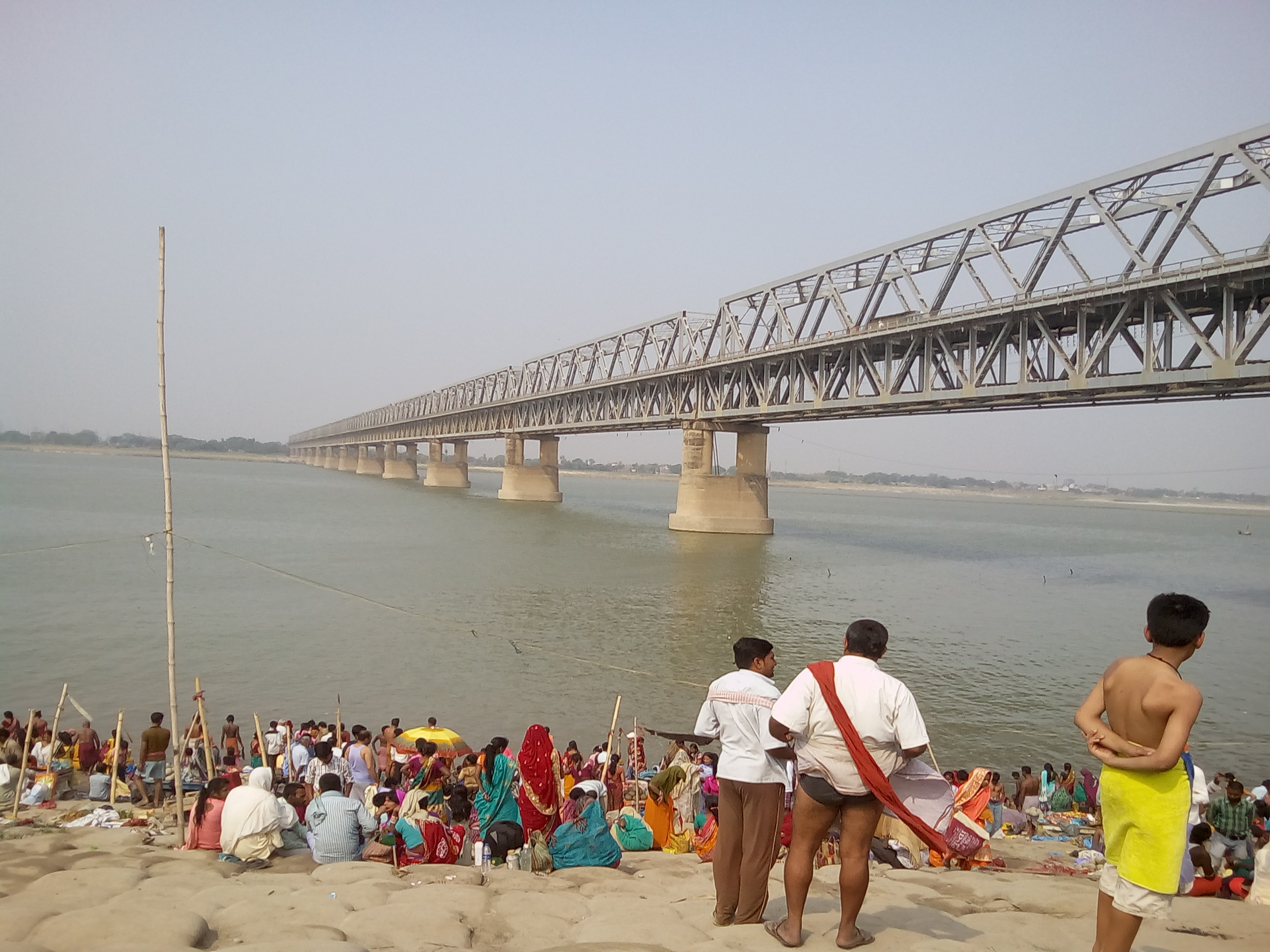
View of Rajendra Pul on the Ganga river from Simaria Ghat

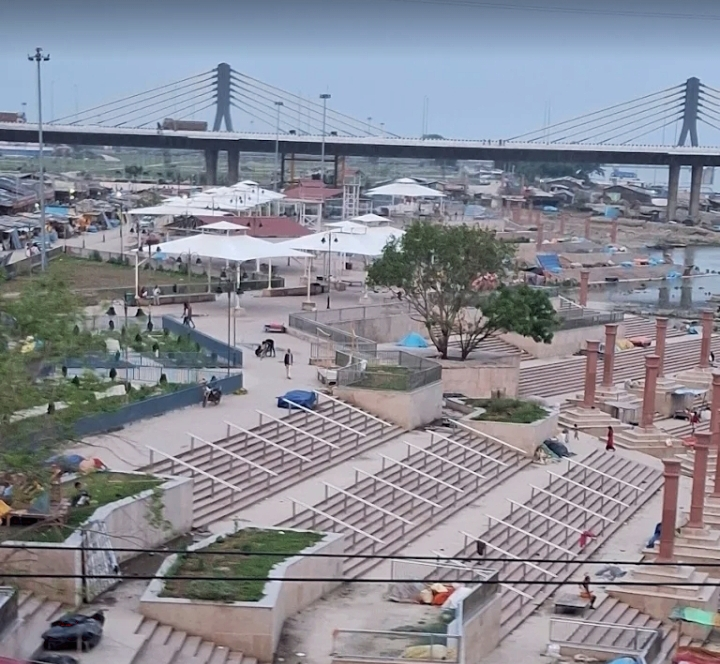
View of the newly renovated Simaria Ghat

== Archaeological tourism ==
Balirajgarh and Vaishali are the two major locations for the ancient archeological sites in the Mithila region.

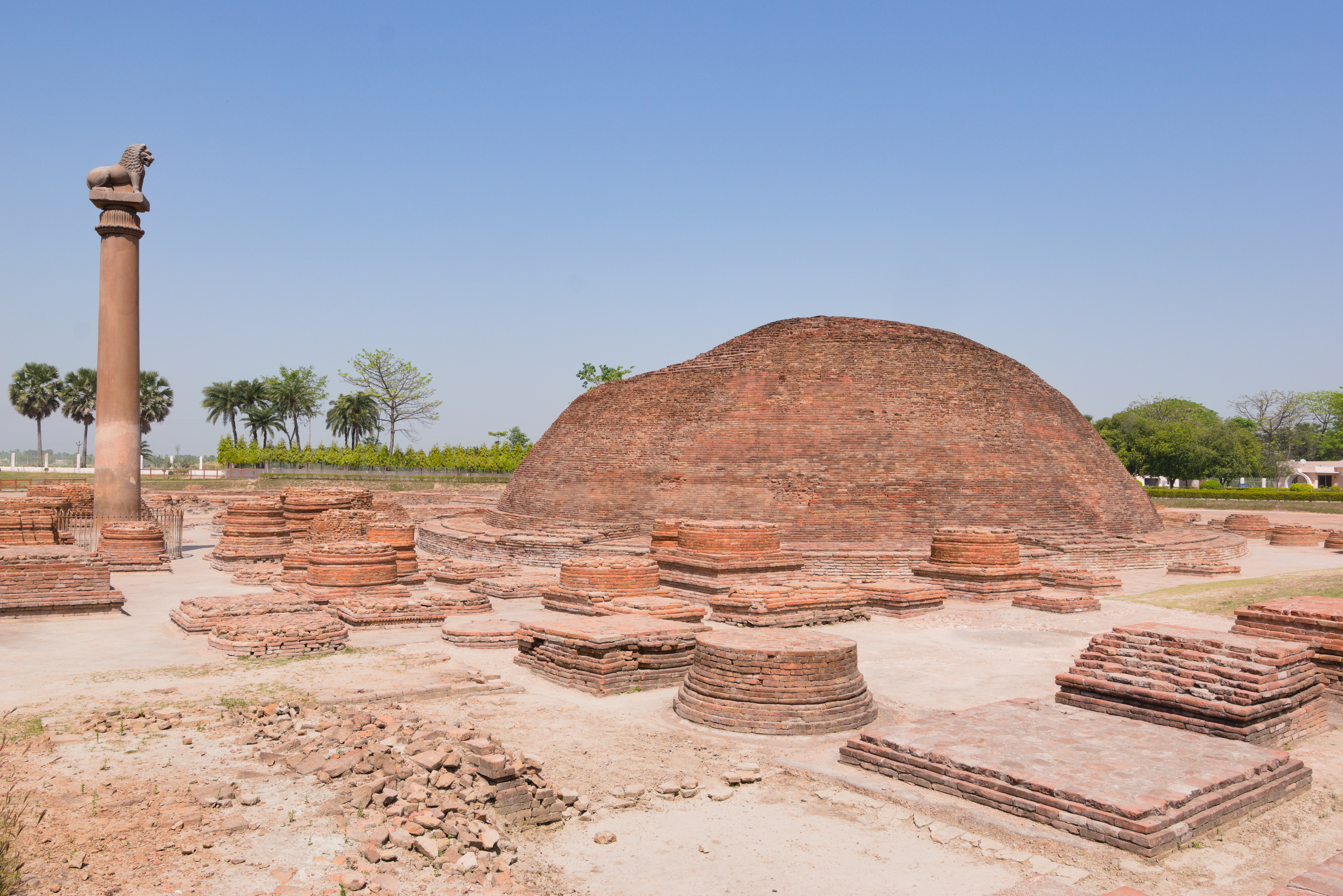
Ananda Stupa with Ashok lion pillar at vaishali

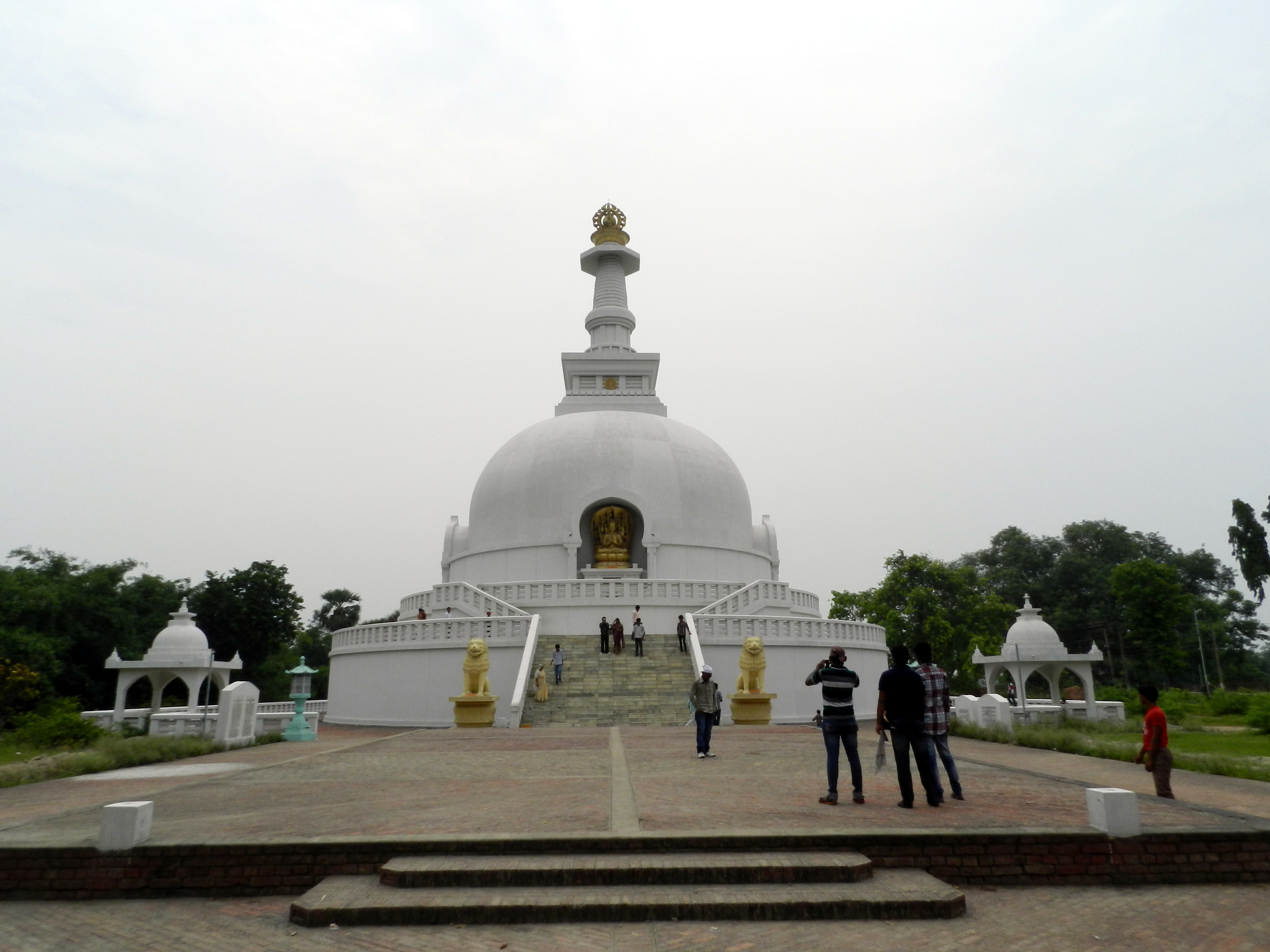
Buddha Stupa in Vaishali

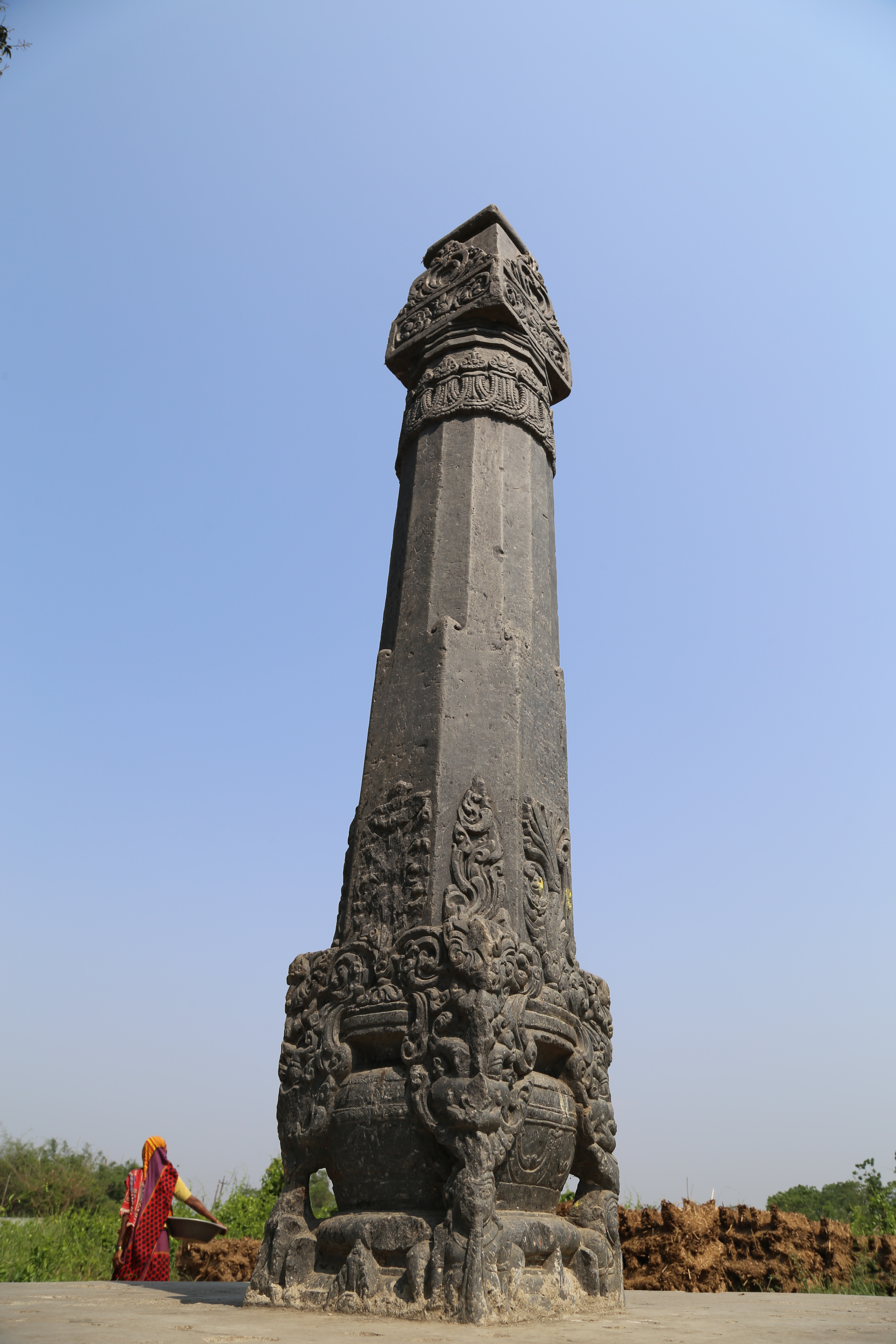
Pillar at Simroungarh related to the Karnat Dynasty in Mithila

The city of Simraungadh was the capital of the Karnat Dynasty in Mithila. It was founded by the first Karnat king Nanyadeva of Mithila in the year 1097 AD. Before it, Nanpur was the capital of his kingdom.

== Historical tourism ==
Rajnagar Palace is a historical place in the Madhubani district of the Mithila region. It was built on the cost of 9 lakhs silver coins so it is also known as Naulakha palace. It was built by Maharaja Rameshwar Singh of Raj Darbhanga during the period of 17th century CE. It was made the capital of Mithila during that period. It is spread over approximately 1500 acres of land. There are 11 historical Hindu temples in the campus of the Rajnagar Palace.

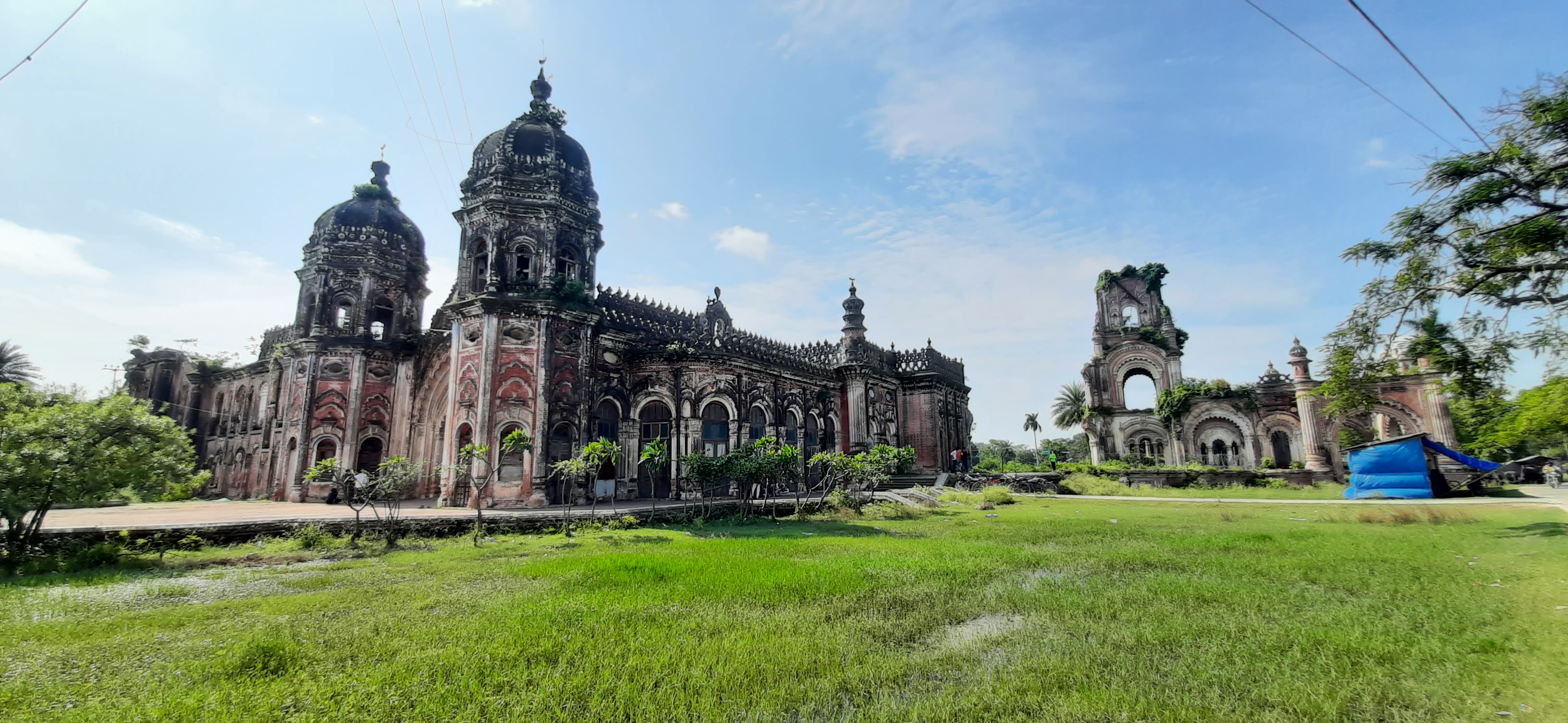
Ruins of Rajnagar Palace

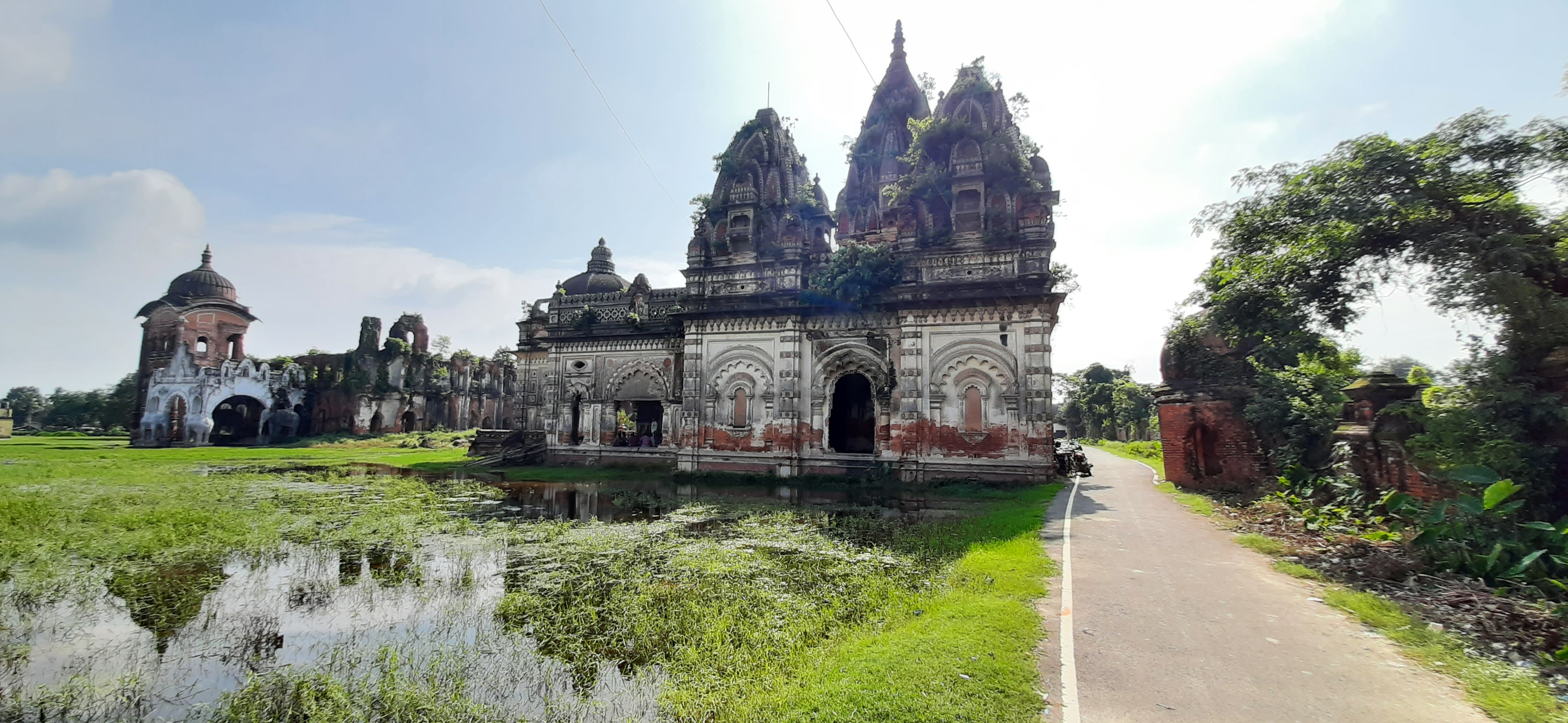

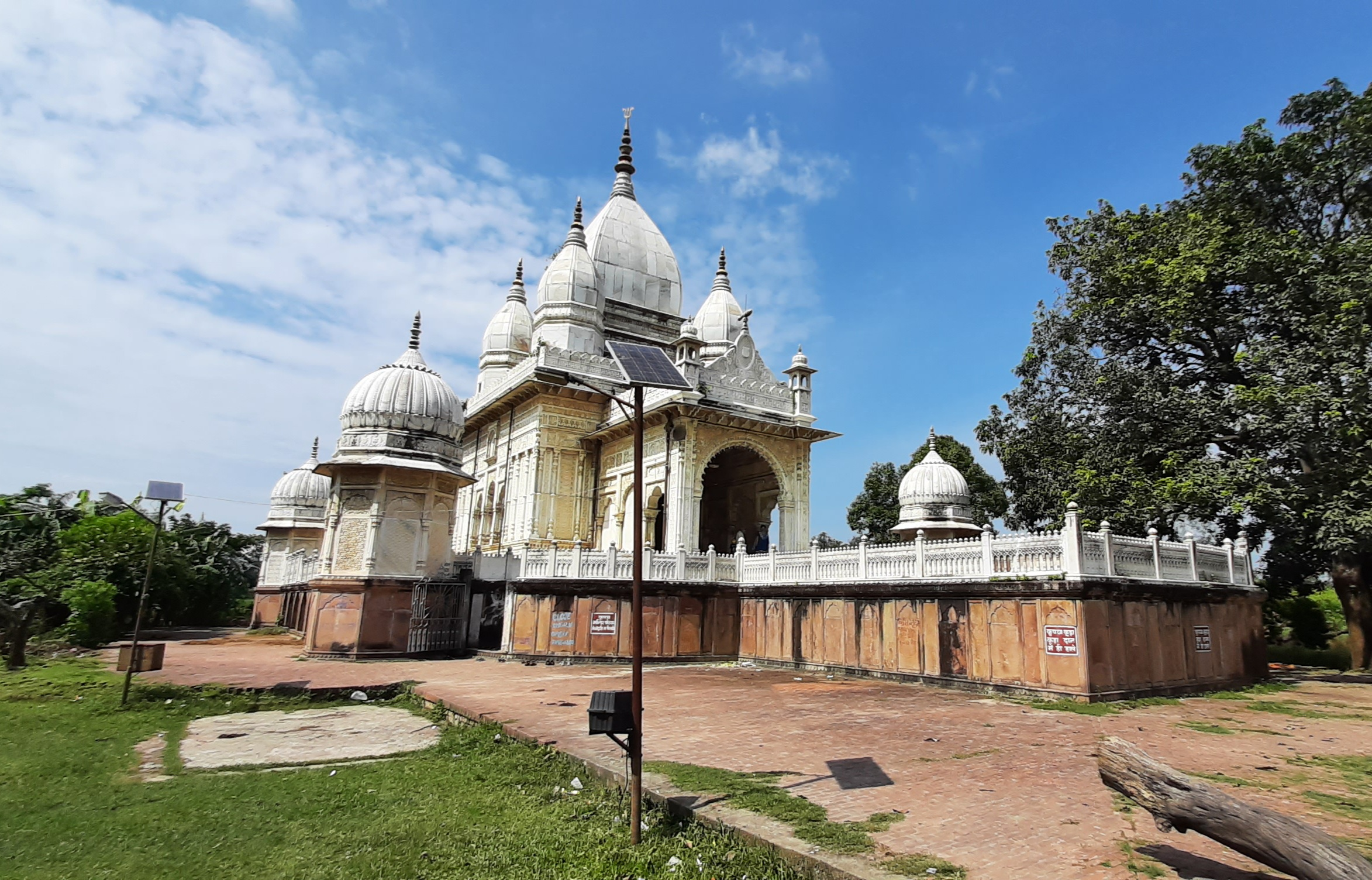
Kali Mandir made by white marble in the campus of Rajnagar

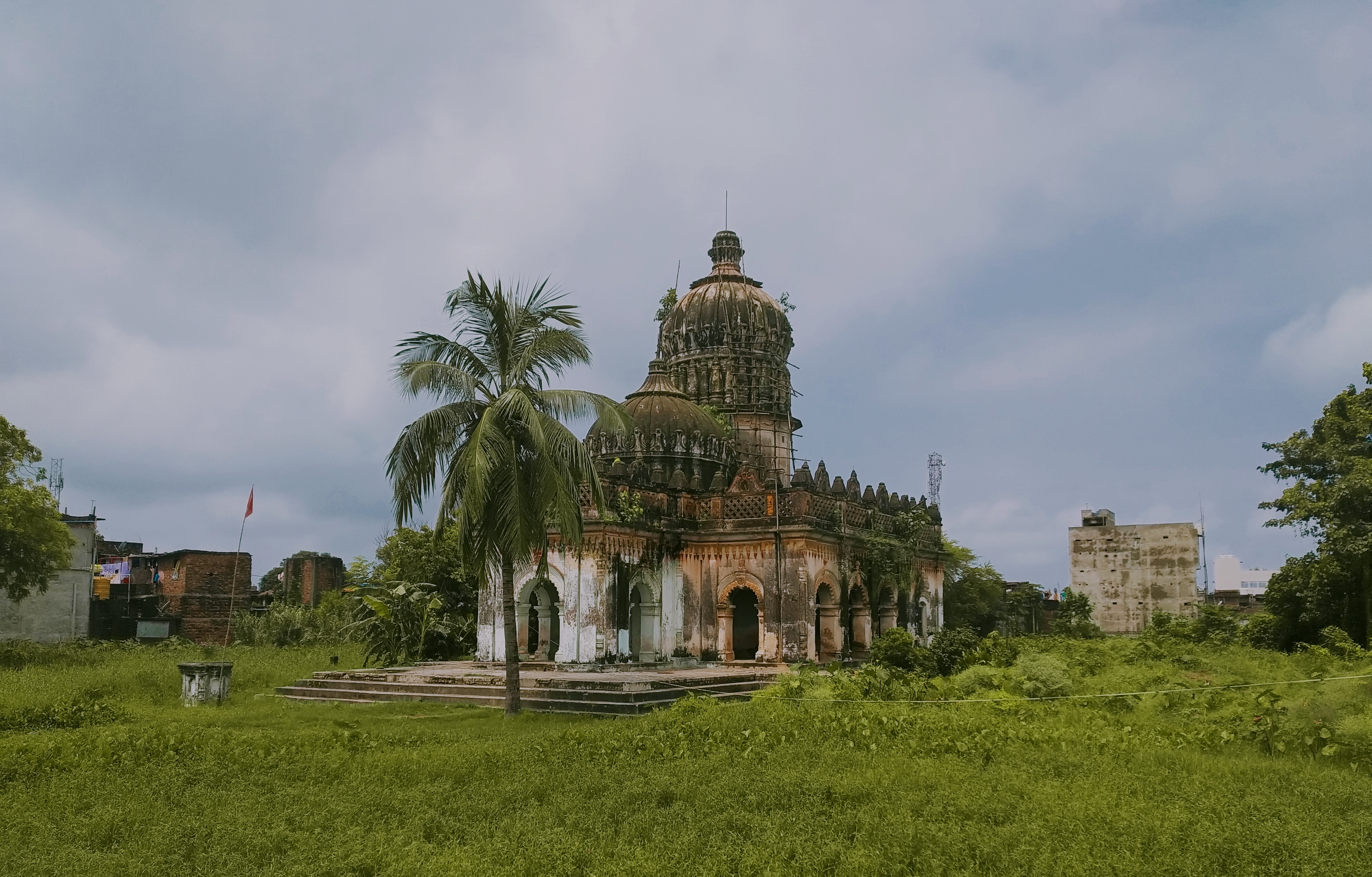
Ancient Choraut Mandir in Sursand, Sitamarhi

In the region of Mithila, there are two important historical sites related to the historical matrimonial gathering of the Maithil Brahmins in the Indian subcontinent. These two locations are Saurath Sabha and Sasaula Sabha Gachhis. The Saurath Sabha Gachhi is famous for its historical matrimonial gathering of the Maithil Brahmins in the region. The premises of the Saurath Sabha Gachhi hold historical Lord Shiva temple known as Madhaweshwar Nath Mahadev Mandir and the Institute of Panjis system that records genealogical data related to the Maithil Vivah in the subcontinent.

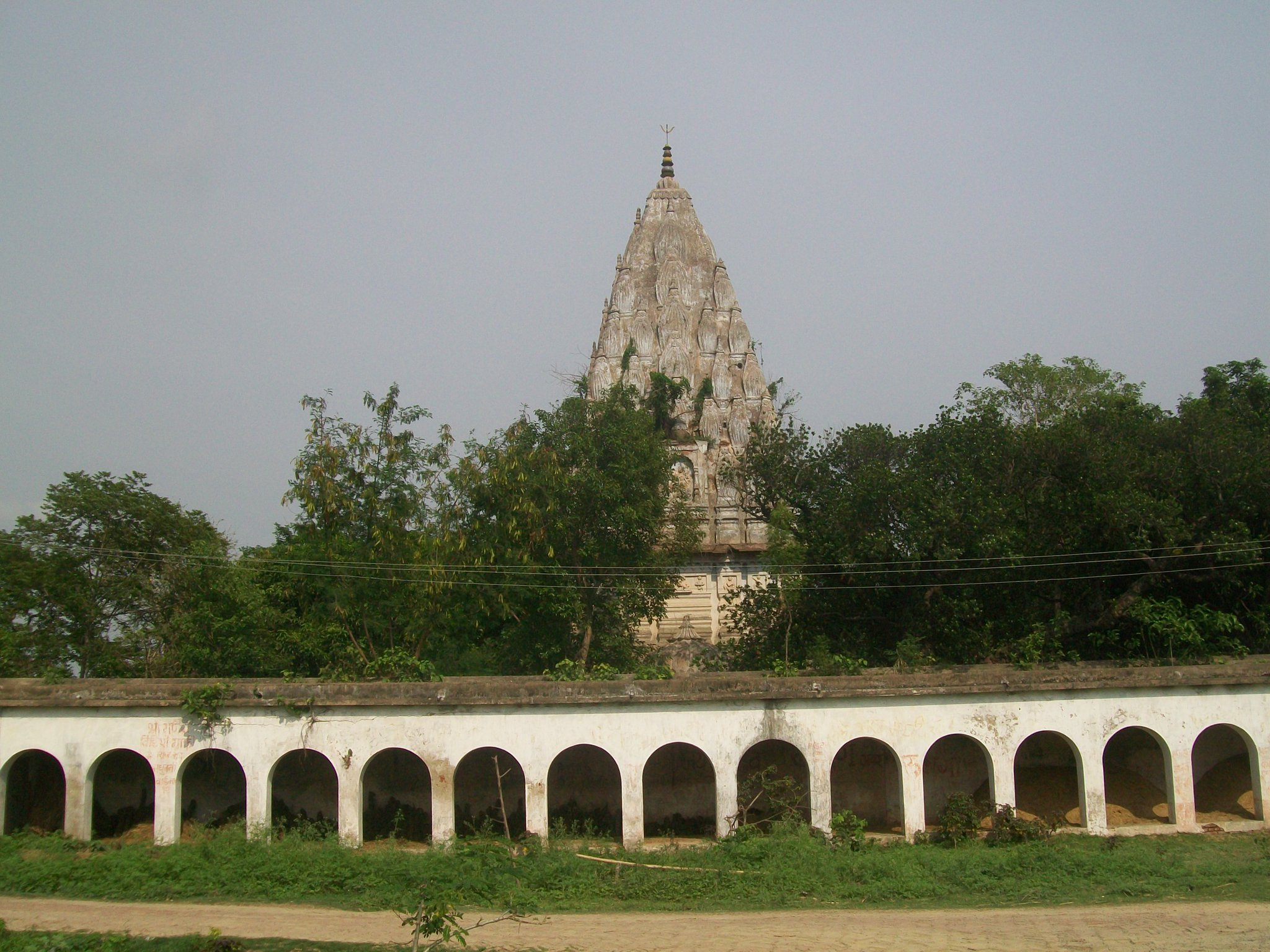
Madhaweshwar Nath Mahadev Mandir

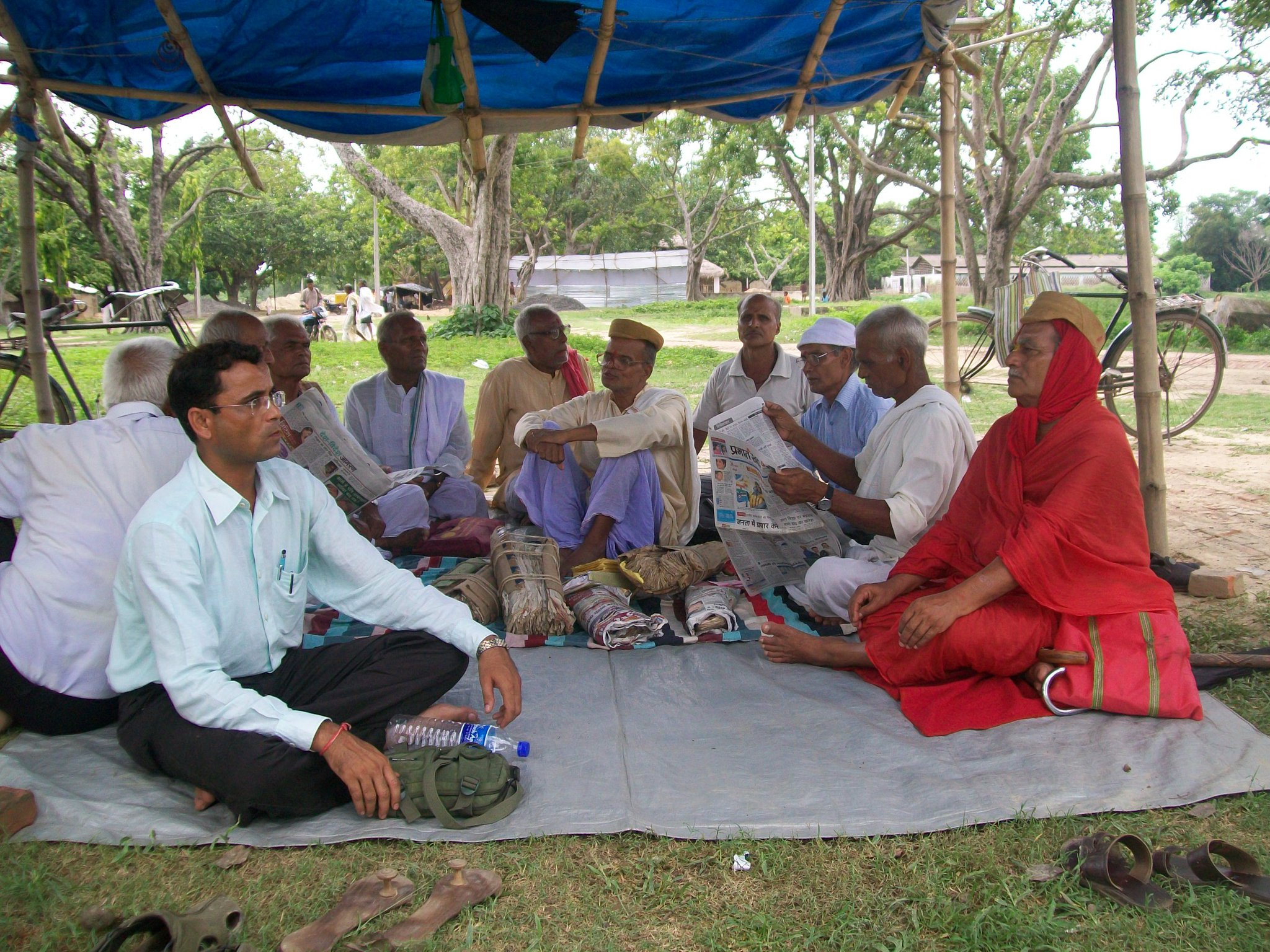
A group of the matrimonial gathered in the campus of the Saurath Sabha

== Mithila paintings and arts ==
The iconic public painting of the Mithila art or Madhubani paintings at the Madhubani Railway Station in Mithila.

The art and painting works of the Mithila region are also the source of tourism in the region. The Madhubani painting also known as Mithila painting is world famous painting for its unique features. Tourists from different parts of the world come here to learn and buy the art and painting works of the artists in region. It has got international attention in the countries like USA, Japan, Germany and France. Jitwarpur is a major village in the region known for crafting Mithila arts. The village is only 4 kilometres in the north direction from the headquarter of the Madhubani district. It is a hub for the Mithila arts in the region. The village has been recognised as the first Shilpgram of Bihar in India.

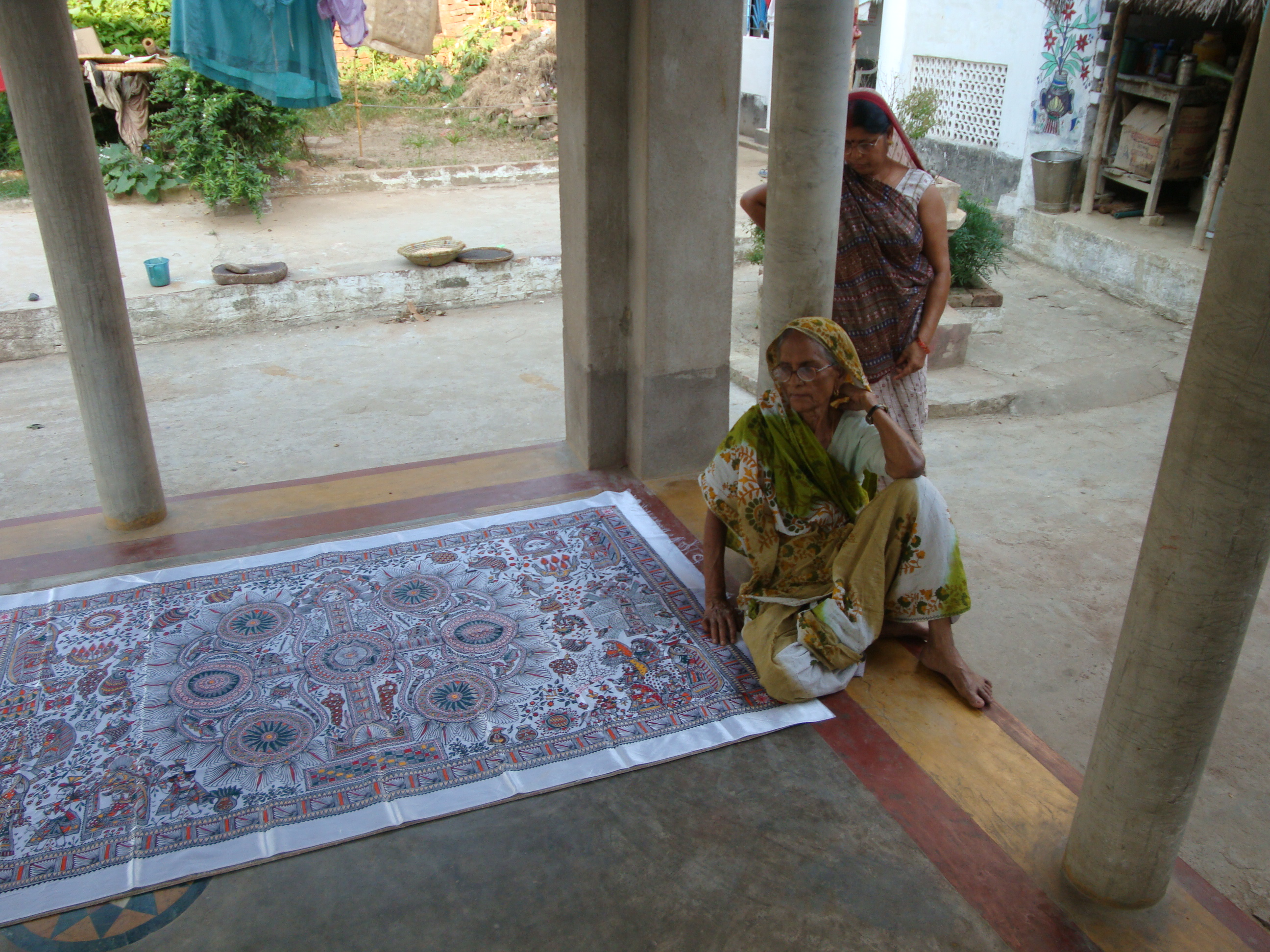
Showing Mithila painting work of an artist Mahasundari Devi from Madhubani district

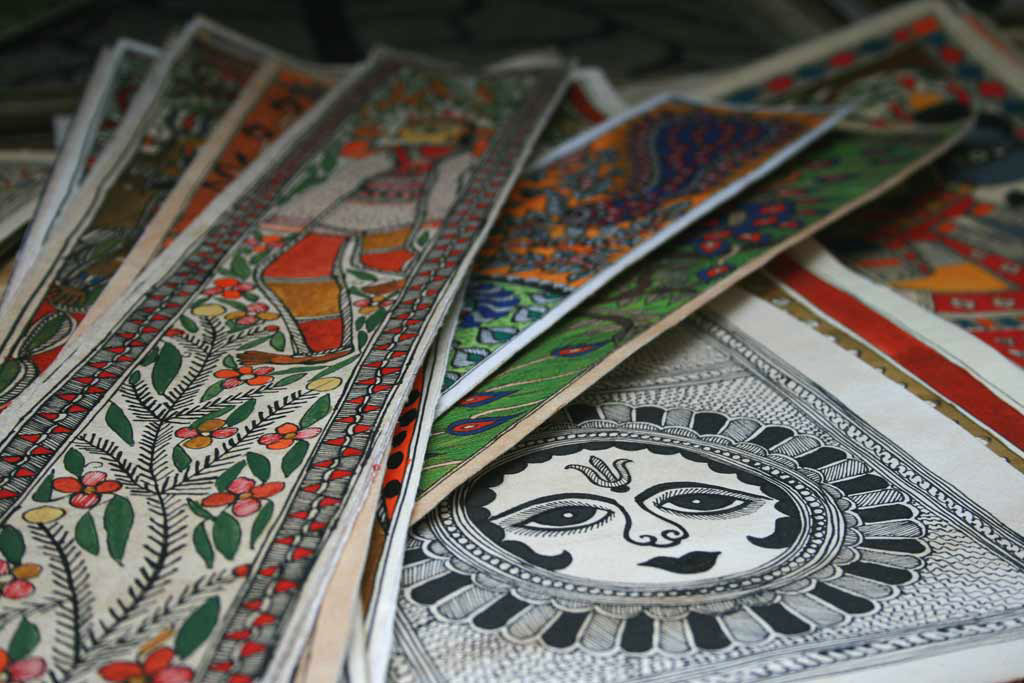
Madhubani paintings

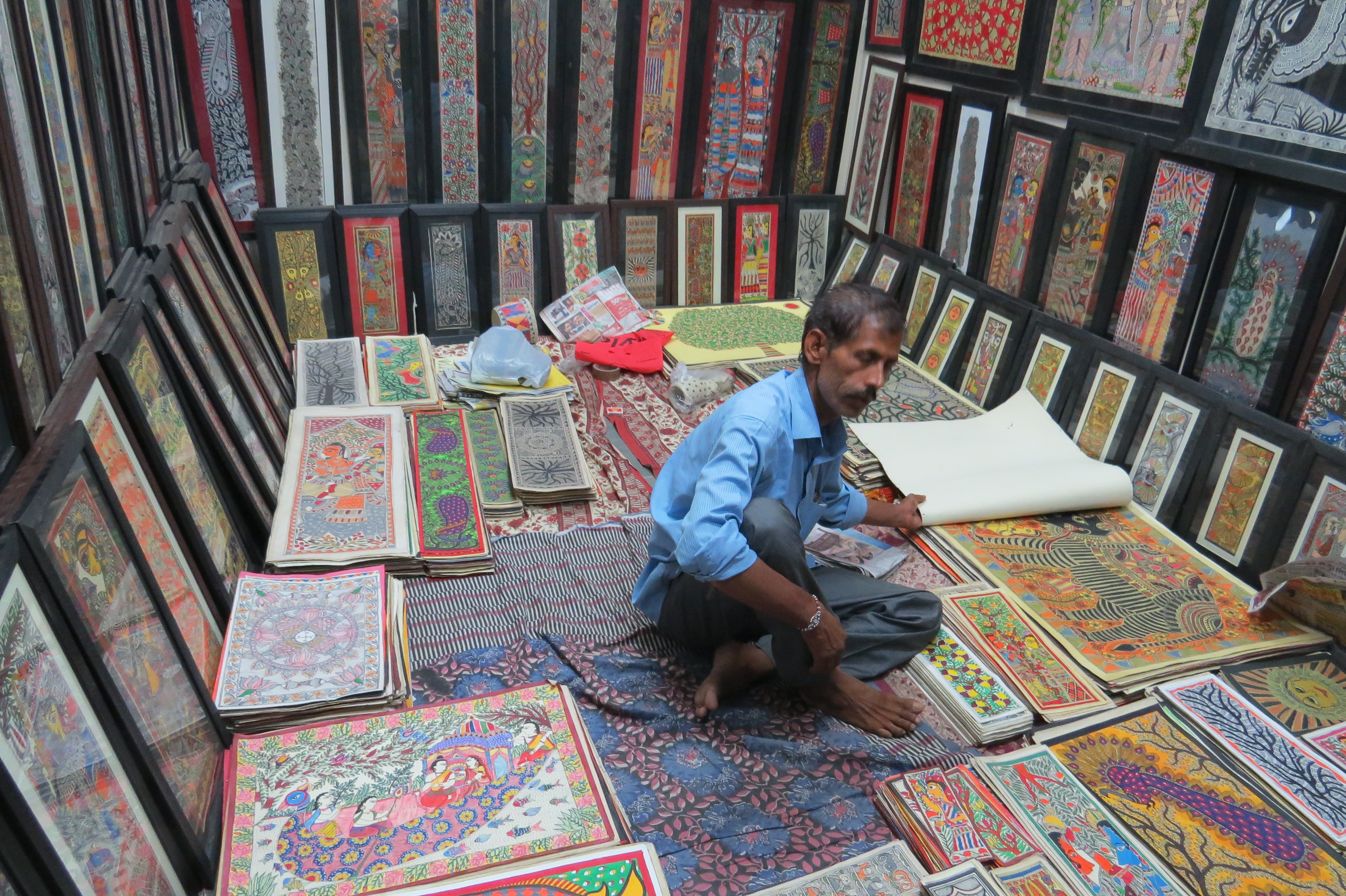
Shop of Mithila paintings
