= Sursand =

Town in Bihar

- Town
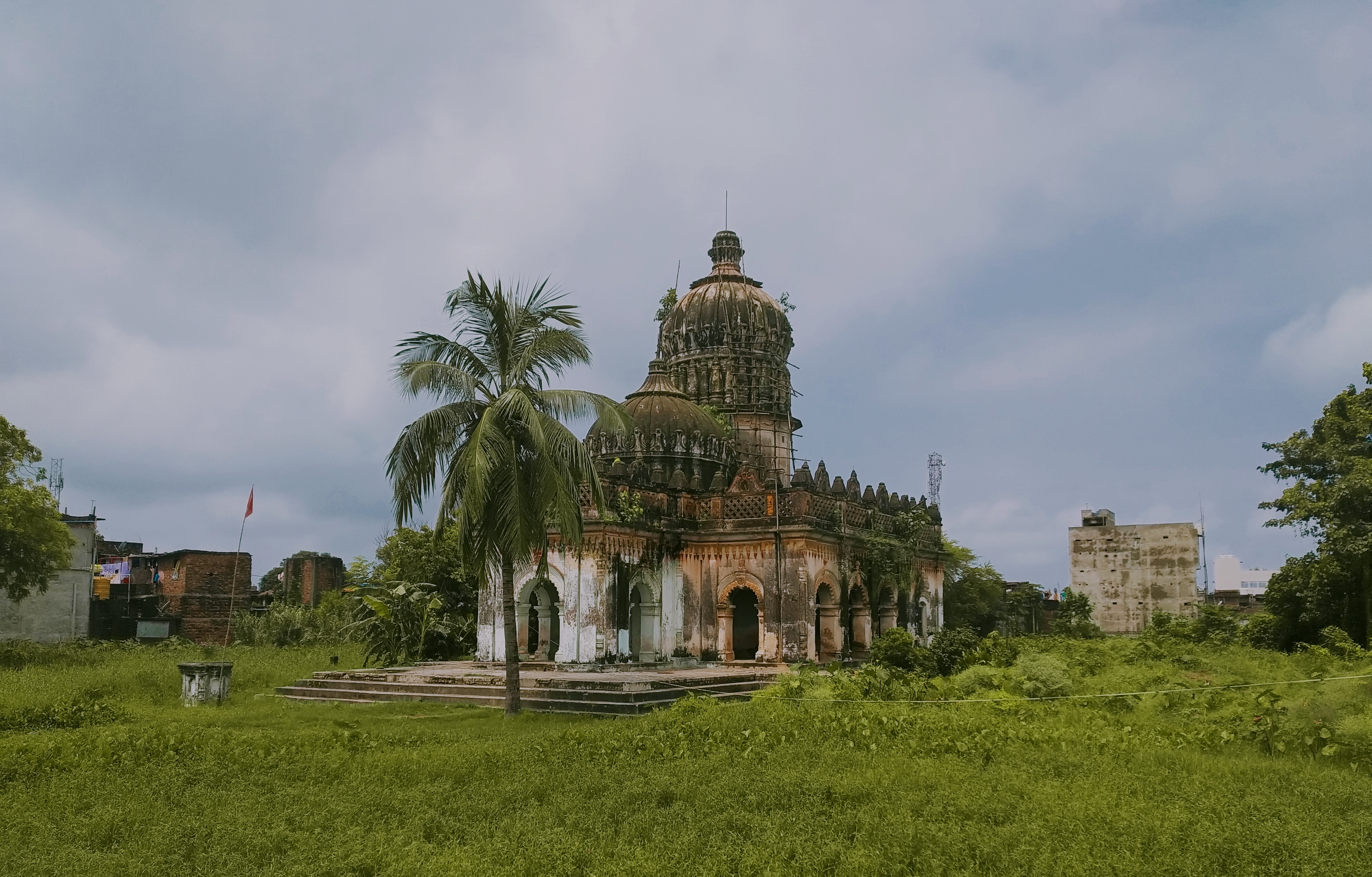
- An ancient temple locally known as Choraut Mandir in Sursand

- Location in Bihar, India
- Coordinates: 26°39′0″N 85°43′0″E
- Country: India
- State: Bihar
- Region: Mithila
- District: Sitamarhi

Government
  - Type: Nagar Panchayat
- Elevation: 55 m (180 ft)

Population (2011)
  - Total: 29,688

Languages
  - Official: Maithili, Hindi
- Time zone: UTC+5:30 (IST)
- Postal code: 843331
- Vehicle registration: BR-30
- Coastline: 0 kilometres (0 mi)

Sursand is an Indian town in the Mithila region of Bihar near the Indo-Nepal border. It was previously the capital of the Sursand Raj in the region. It is about 25 Km to the east of Sitamarhi, the district headquarters, and approximately 5 Km to the west of Bhitthamore.

== History ==
The village has the ruins of a fortress known as Sursandgarh, which was constructed during the Mughal period by King Sursen.

According to an account published in the Bengal District Gazetteers,

The name of the place is said to be derived from Sur Sen, a chieftain who once lived there. After his death, it lapsed once more into jungle, until it was reclaimed by two brothers—Mahesh Jha and Amar Jha, the founders of the present Sursand family. These brothers, the story runs, left their home at Ghograha, in the district of Darbhanga, and came to settle at Jadupati, a village belonging to them, 8 miles from Sursand. One day Mahesh Jha went with his astrologer to hunt in the woods at Sursand, and came across the ruins of Sur Sen's fort. The astrologer having told him that the man who made a home there would be a Raja, Mahesh Jha acted on his advice and cleared the jungle. The several branches of the Sursand family sprang from his son, Chaudhri Kelwal Krishna. Amar Jha's branch did not prosper, and his descendants are impoverished. Chaudhri Hirdai Narayan, a descendant of the elder branch, added largely to the family estates.

== Gallery ==
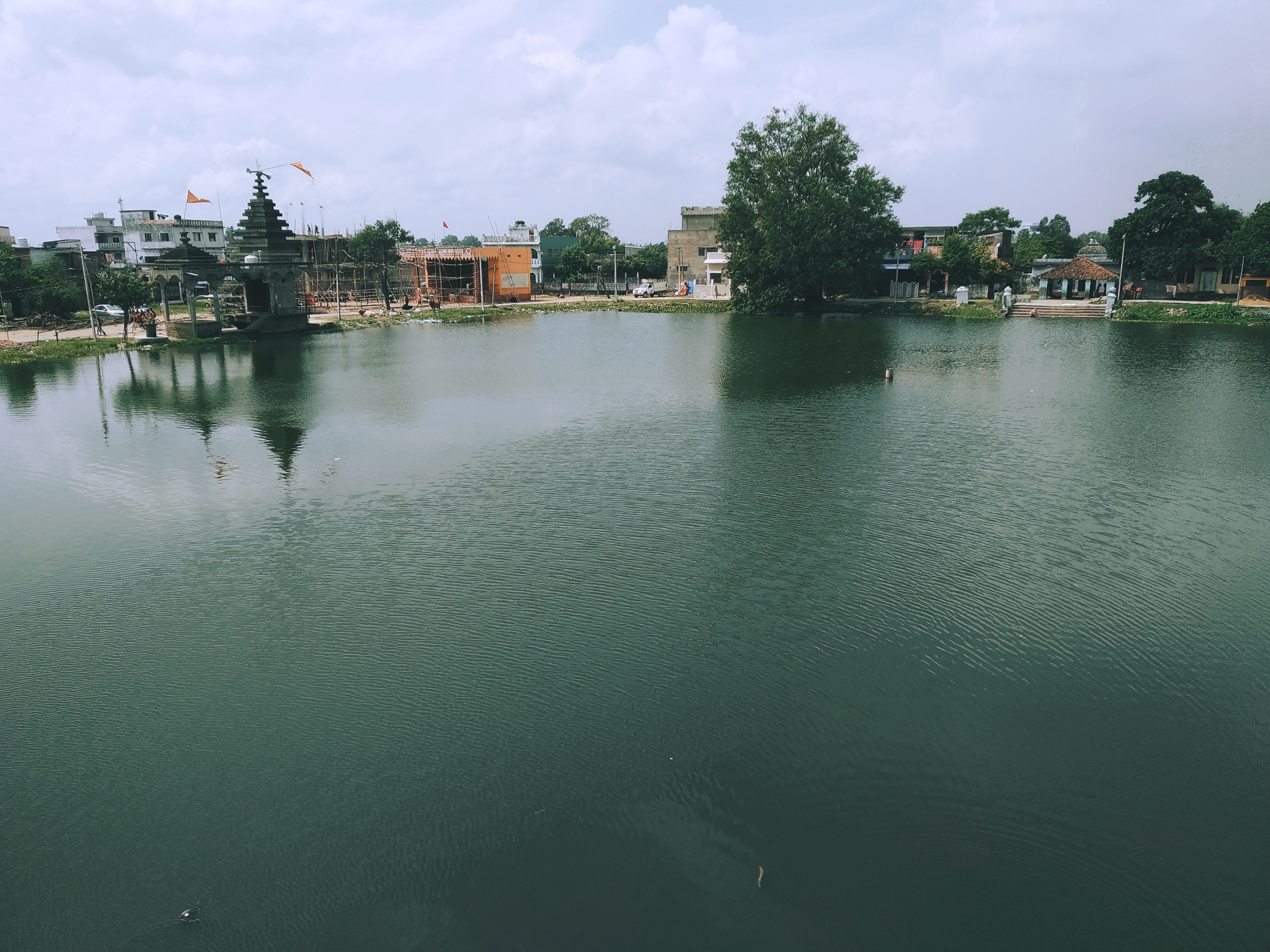
Famous pond in Sursand

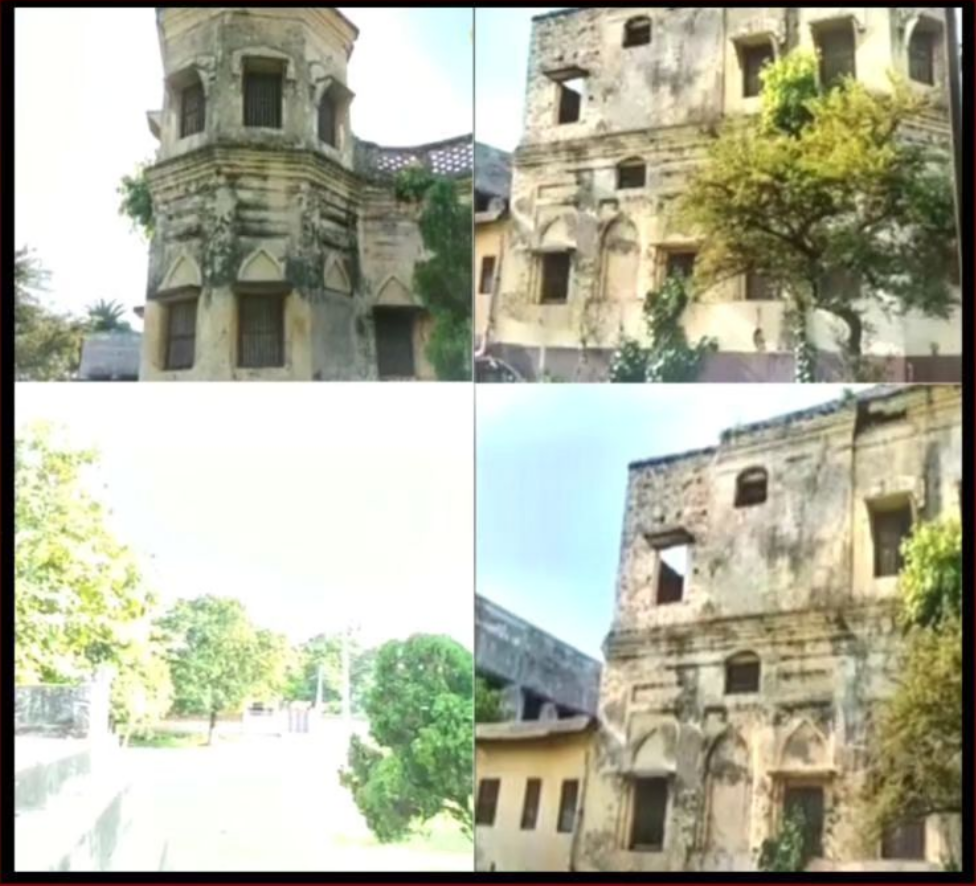
Sursand Palace in ruins

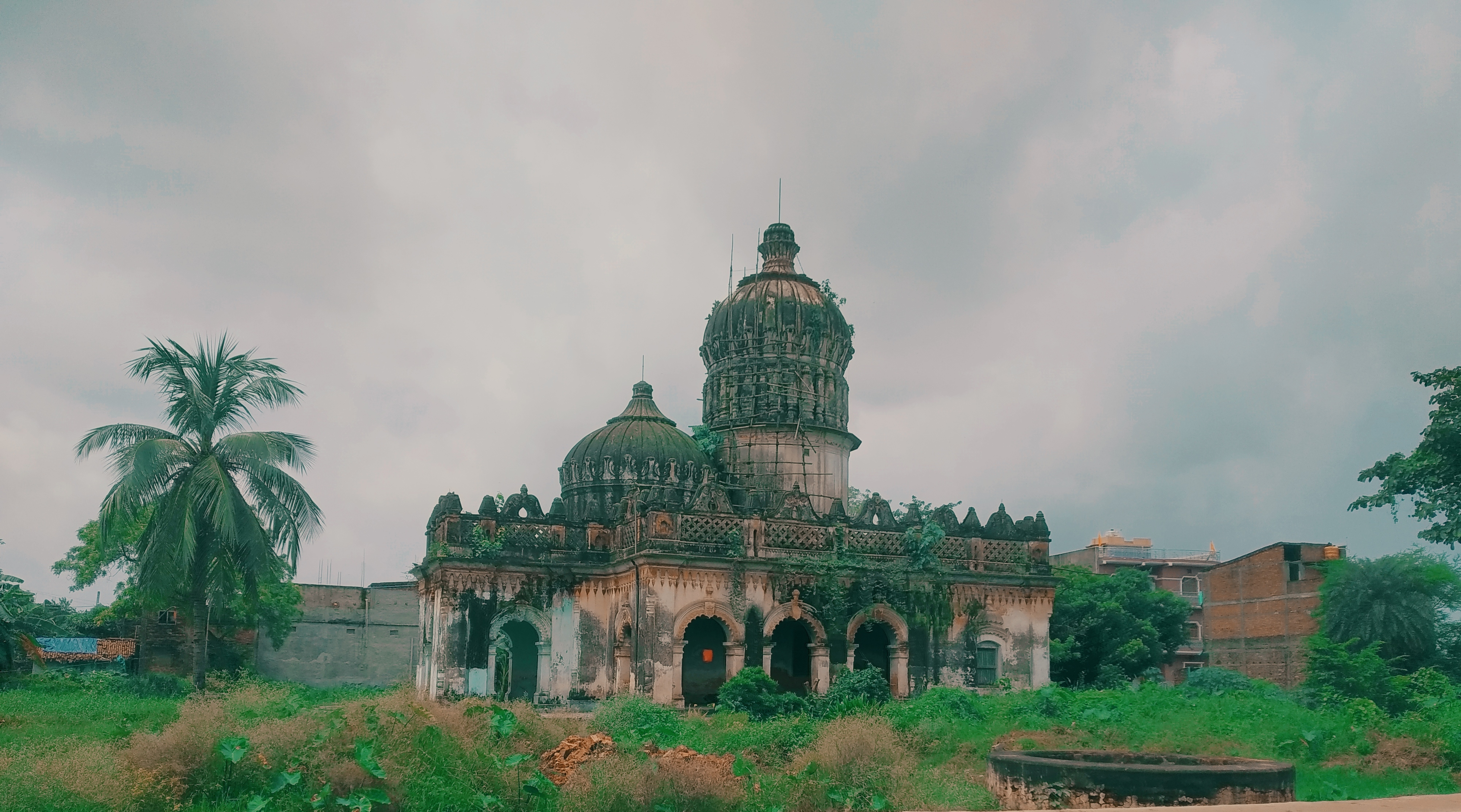
A Hindu temple in Sursand

== Archaeological geography ==
In the outskirts of the modern town, the area locally known as Garh Devi Sthan has a three-metre high circular mound covering about two acres of ground.

== Proposed railway station ==
In the town of Sursand, a railway station has been proposed by the Indian Railways. It will be a major railway station on the proposed Sitamarhi-Jaynagar-Nirmali Via Sursand Railway Line.

== Notable people ==
Shyam Nandan Prasad Mishra served as the Union Deputy Minister for Planning from 1954 to 1962.

== Schools and College ==
Jawahar Lal Neharu Memorial College, Nawahi, Sitamarhi
