= Choraut Mandir, Sursand =

Coordinates: 26°38′34″N 85°43′34″E

Choraut Mandir
- चोरौत मंदिर
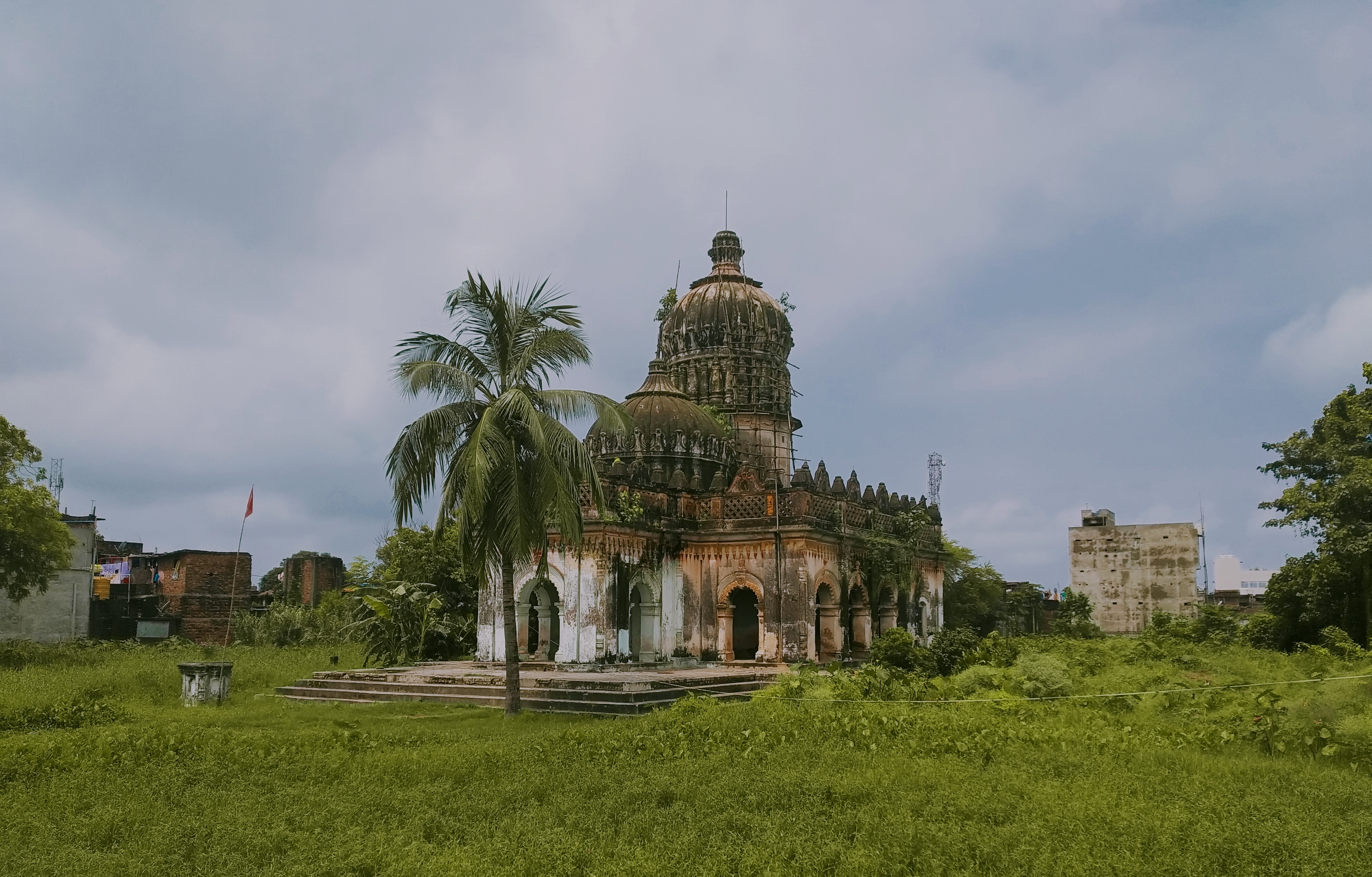
- The iconic Choraut Mandir at Sursand

Religion
- Affiliation: Hinduism

Location
- Location: Budhwa Pokhair, Sursand, Sitamarhi district, Mithila region
- State: Bihar
- Country: India
- Interactive map of Choraut Mandir

Choraut Mandir (or Charaut Mandir) (Maithili: चोरौत मंदिर) is an old Hindu iconic temple in Sursand town of Sitamarhi district in the Mithila region of Bihar.

== Description ==
Choraut Mandir is an old Hindu iconic temple located near the locally famous pond Budhwa Pokhair in the Sursand town of the Mithila region of Bihar. It is connected by the National Highway 227 from the district headquarter town Sitamarhi.

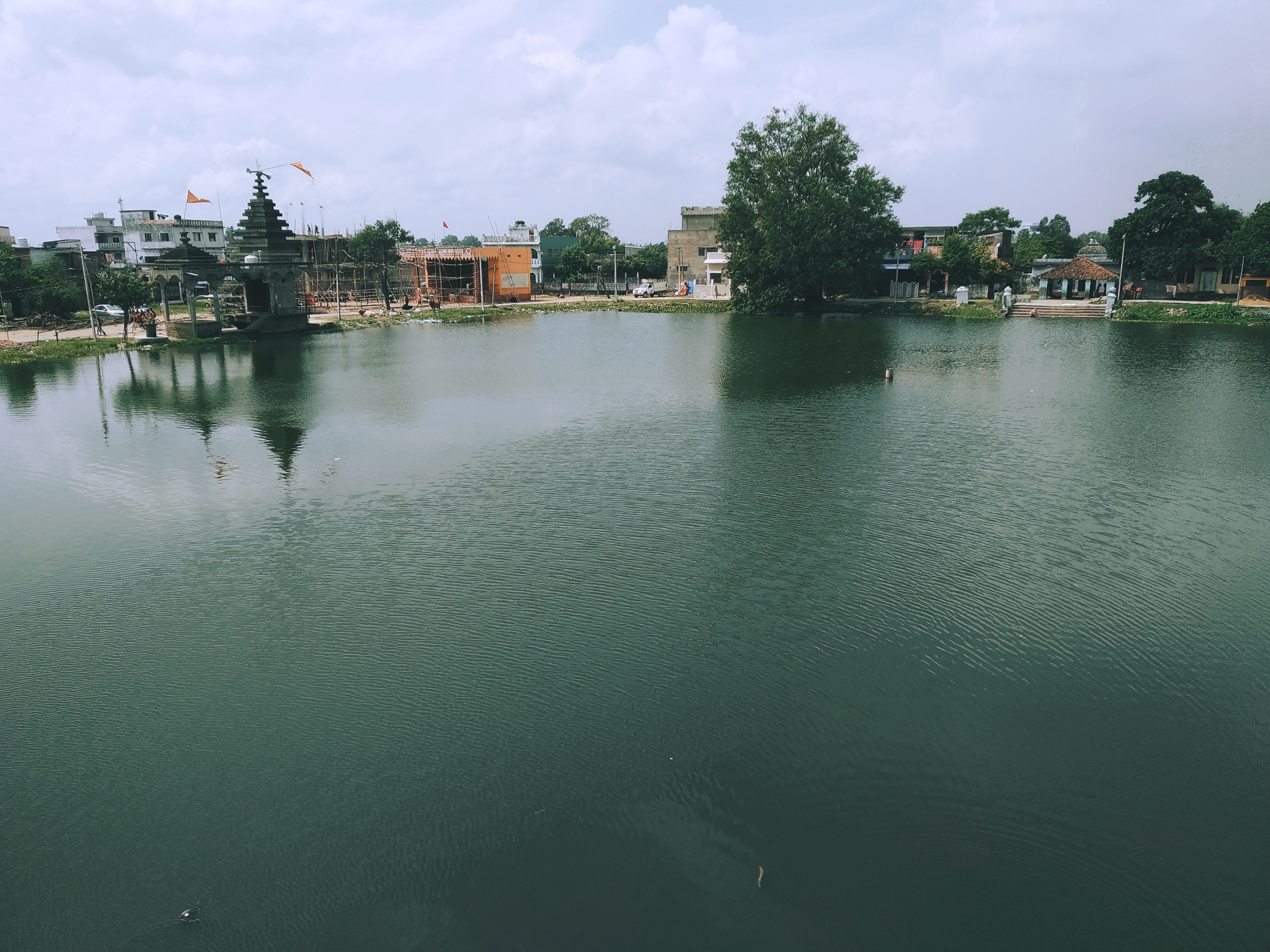
View of the famous Budhwa Pokhair near the temple of Choraut Mandir
