= Navlakha Palace =

Rajnagar Palace
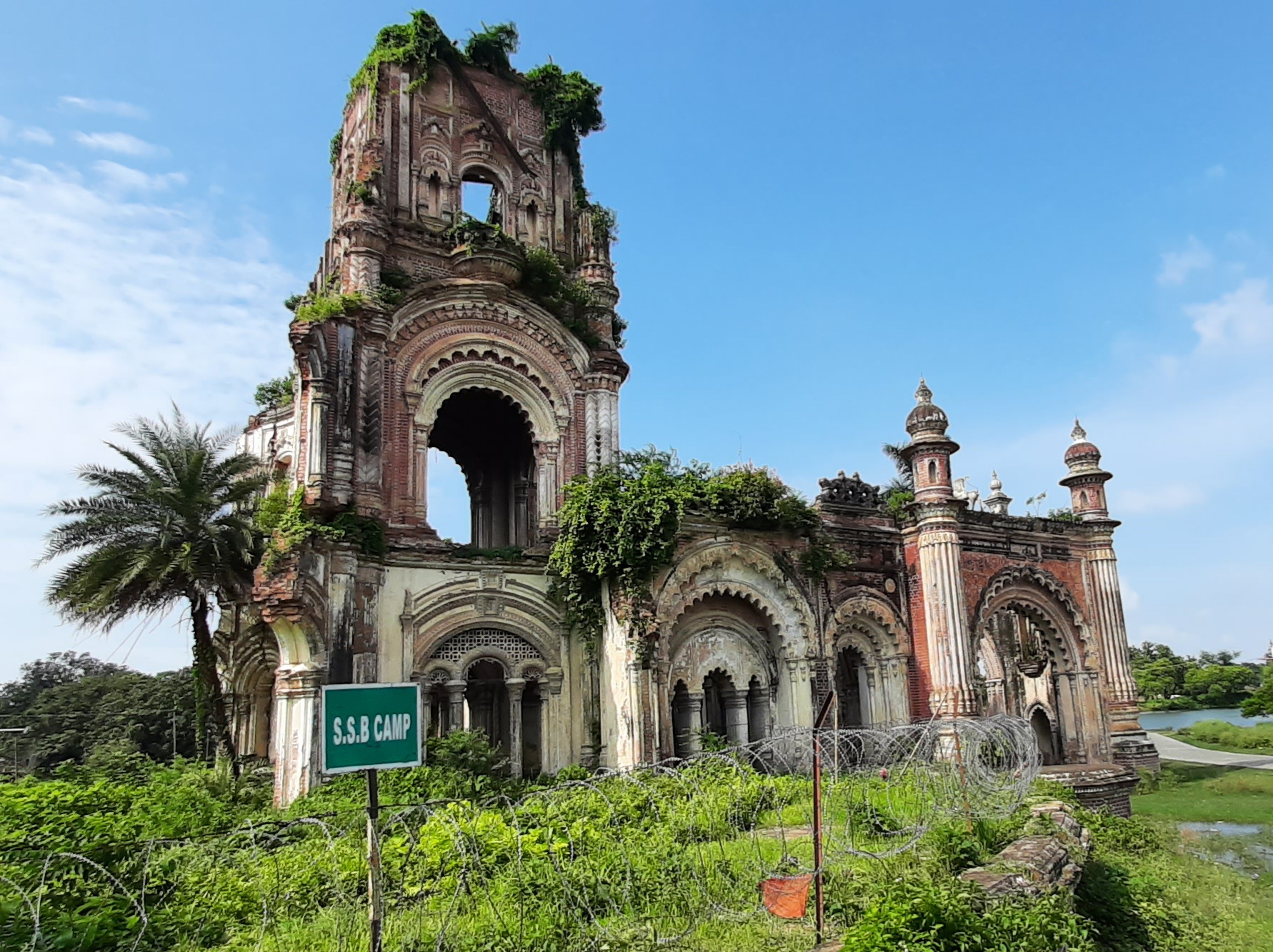
- Ruins of the Navlakha Palace
- Interactive map of Rajnagar Palace
- 26.404733°N 86.171718°E
- Type: Palace
- Location: Rajnagar, Bihar, India

History
- Founder: Darbhanga Raj
- Built: 19th-century
- Demolished: 15 January 1934

Site notes
- Area: 1,500 acres (610 ha)
- Architectural style: Mithila Art
- Owner: Darbhanga Maharaja

Navlakha Palace, also known as Rajnagar Palace, is a royal palace in the town of Rajnagar, near Madhubani in Bihar, India. The palace was built by Maithali Brahmin Maharaja Rameshwar Singh of Darbhanga.

== History ==
It was built by Rameshwar Singh, the younger brother of Lakshmeshwar Singh, the Maharaja of Darbhanga, between 1884 and 1929 to serve as the administrative capital of Darbhanga Raj. This complex covers 1,500 acres (610 ha). It includes 11 temples to gods and goddesses, and several forts and palaces. It suffered significant damage during the 1934 Bihar–Nepal earthquake and has never been rebuilt.

== Architecture ==
Up to 22 layers of carving were used in the construction of the monument, more than the Taj Mahal, which has a maximum of 15 layers. Its Kali temple is made of ivory and white marble that resembles the Taj Mahal. The portico has arches standing on four elephants built from cement and is allegedly one of the first cement structures in India. The oldest surviving Mithila painting is found in the Gasauni Ghar (the room where the family deity is kept) of the palace. Made in 1919 on the occasion of the Maharaja's daughter's wedding, there are very few written or photographic records of the palace.

== Present condition ==
The palace is currently owned by the Raj Darbhanga. Following the 1934 earthquake, it was never repaired. It is continually suffering from encroachment. Locals have long demanded that it be turned into a tourist site.

== See also ==
- Nargona Palace
- Darbhanga Fort
- Anand Bagh Palace
- Rohtasgarh Fort
- Munger Fort
