= Raj Darbhanga =

Zamindari Estate

- 1557; 469 years ago–1947 CE
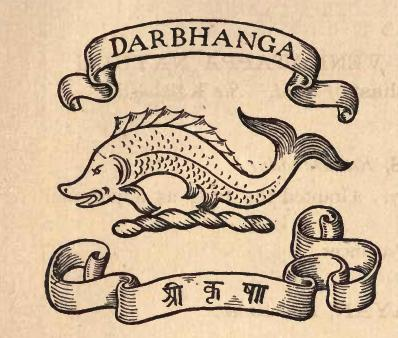
- Flag
- Capital: Darbhanga
- Common languages: Maithili, Sanskrit
- Religion: Hinduism
- Government: Tributary to the Mughal Empire (1557–1684 AD); De facto independent state (1684–1804 AD); Zamindari estate under the British Raj (1804–1947 AD)
- Historical era: Medieval India
  - Established: 1557; 469 years ago
  - Disestablished: 1947 CE

Area
- 1901: 10,360 km^{2} (4,000 sq mi)
Preceded by	Succeeded by
Oiniwar dynasty	Republic of India
- Today part of: India and Nepal

Part of a series on the
History of Bihar
Ancient History
Prehistoric and Vedic Era

- Chirand (Neolithic) - Vedic period - Videha - Mithila (ancient) - Anga - Kikata

Urbanisation and Shramana

- Second Urbanisation - Rise of Shramana - Buddhism • Jainism • Ajivika

Gaṇasaṅghas

- Magadha - Vajjika League

  - Nāya
  - Vajji (tribe)
  - Licchavis of Vaishali

- Malla (tribe) - Kashi - Bulis

Imperial Magadha

- Brihadratha dynasty - Haryanka dynasty

  - Bimbisara
  - Ajatashatru

- Shishunaga dynasty - Nanda Empire

  - Mahapadma Nanda

- Maurya Empire

  - Chandragupta Maurya
  - Ashoka
Post-Mauryan and Smriti

- Shunga Empire

  - Pushyamitra Shunga

- Kanva dynasty - Development of Smriti - Brahmanical Revival

The Interregnum

- Kushan Influence - Mitra Dynasty - Resurgence of Licchavis

Classical and medieval
The Classical Age

- Gupta Empire

Early Medieval

- Later Gupta dynasty - Maukharis

Pala Era and Feudatories

- Pala Empire - Khayaravala dynasty - Pithipatis of Magadha

Medieval Mithila

- Karnats of Mithila - Oiniwar dynasty

Islamic Incursions

- Delhi Sultanate

Centers of Learning

- Nalanda - Vikramashila - Odantapuri - Telhara monastery

Early-modern
Afghan and Mughal Rule

- Sur Empire

  - Sher Shah Suri

- Mughal Empire

  - Bihar Subah
Regional Chieftaincies

- Chakwars - Chero dynasty - Gidhaur chieftaincy - Kharagpur Raj - Khokhra chieftaincy

Major Zamindari Estates

- Bettiah Raj - Khandavala dynasty - Dumraon Raj - Hathwa Raj - Jagdishpur estate

Colonial & Independence Era
Colonial Rule (1764–1947)

- Battle of Buxar (1764) - East India Company - Permanent Settlement (1793) - Santhal rebellion - Indian Rebellion of 1857

  - Kunwar Singh

- Bihar famine of 1873–74 - Bihar Province (Est. 1912) - 1934 Nepal–Bihar earthquake

Freedom Struggle

- Champaran Satyagraha (1917) - Salt Satyagraha - Bihar Vidyapeeth - Kisan Sabha

  - Swami Sahajanand Saraswati

- Quit India Movement

  - Azad Dasta
Modern Era (Post-1947)
Congress Era (1947–1967)

- Sri Krishna Sinha - Anugrah Narayan Sinha - Zamindari Abolition

Socialist and JP Era (1967–1989)

- Karpoori Thakur - Bihar Movement (1974) - Jayaprakash Narayan - Bhagalpur riots (1989)

RJD Era (1990–2005)

- Lalu Prasad Yadav - Rabri Devi - Fodder Scam

State Division (2000)

- Bihar Reorganisation Act, 2000 - Creation of Jharkhand

NDA Era (2005–Present)

- Nitish Kumar - Politics of Bihar

Culture, art, and society
Art and architecture

- Mahabodhi Temple - Nalanda - Barabar Caves - Tomb of Sher Shah Suri - Rohtas Fort - Golghar - Mithila Painting - Patna Qalam - Manjusha Art - Didarganj Yakshi

Society and language

- Bihari culture - Mithila • Magadh • Anga - Bihari languages

  - Maithili • Magahi
  - Bhojpuri • Angika
Religion

- Religion in Bihar - Buddhism in Bihar - Jainism in Bihar - Islam in Bihar - Sikhism in Bihar

Portal India Portal Bihar

The Darbhanga Raj, also known as Raj Darbhanga and the Khandwala dynasty, was a chieftaincy located within the Mughal province of Bihar which controlled territories, not all contiguous, that were part of the Mithila region now divided between India and Nepal. The rulers of Raj Darbhanga were Maithil Brahmins and their seat in the town of Darbhanga became the core of the Mithila region as the rulers were patrons of Maithil culture and the Maithili language.

At its peak, the dynasty encompassed over 4,000 square miles (10,360 km^{2}) and is described as the "largest and richest of the North Bihar zamindaris and one of the greatest zamindaris of British India". Despite not being recognised as a princely state by the British Raj, Darbhanga was larger and held more magisterial powers than many princely states, particularly those in Western India.

== History ==
The Khandaval dynasty were Maithil Brahmins who came into prominence during the reign of the Mughal emperor Akbar. The extent of their lands, which were not contiguous, varied over time, and by the British era, their area of ownership was smaller than the area that they were granted under earlier sanad arrangements. A particularly significant reduction occurred when the influence of the British Raj caused them to lose control of the territories that were in Nepal but, nonetheless, their holdings were considerable. One estimate suggests that when their rule came to an end, the territories comprised around 6,200 square kilometres (2,400 sq mi), with around 4,500 villages.

=== Formation ===
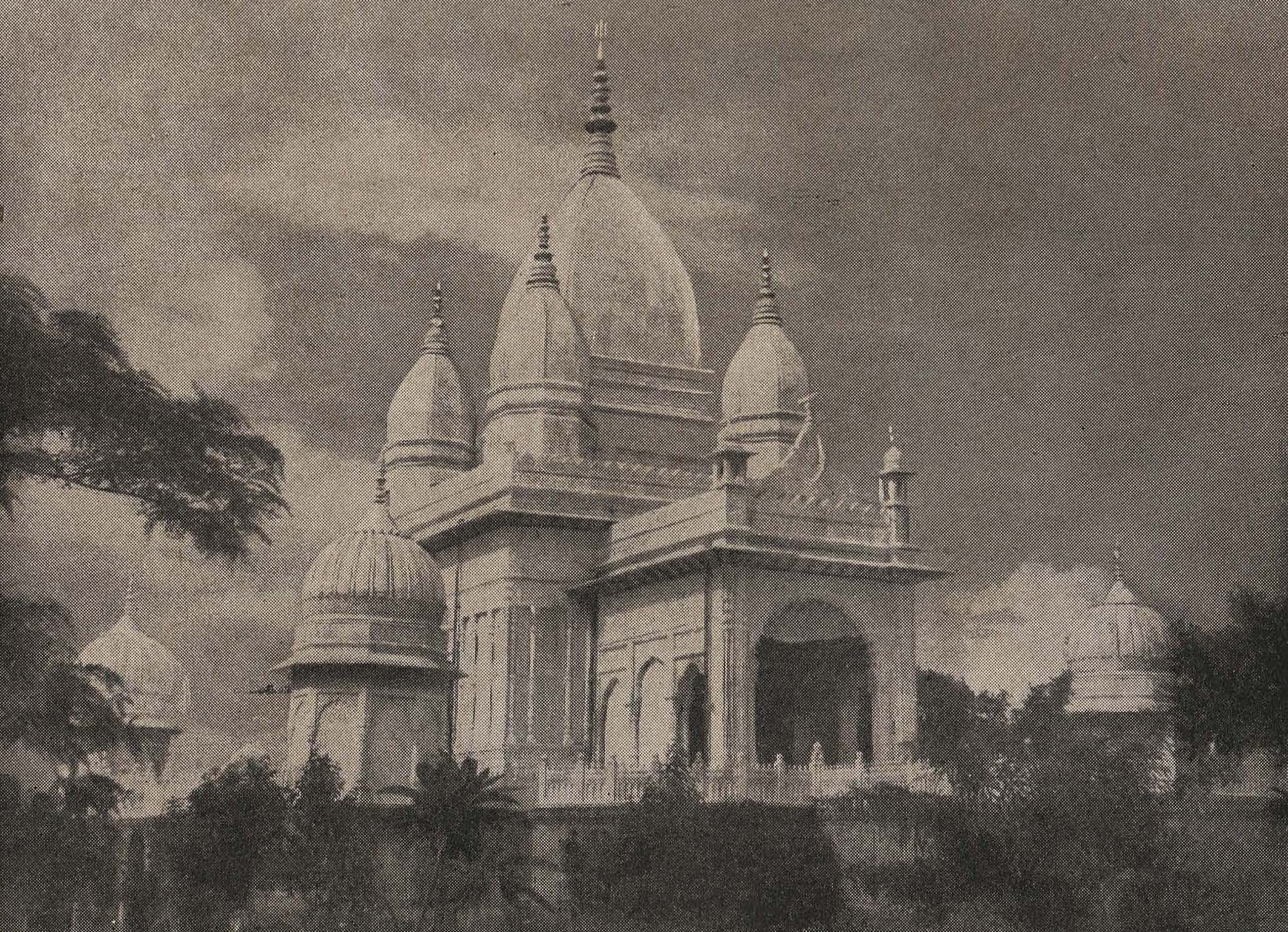
Kali Temple at Rajnagar

The area that now comprises the northern part of the Indian state of Bihar was under a state of lawlessness at the end of the Tughlaq Dynasty. The Tughlaq had attacked and taken control of Bihar and from the end of the Tughlaq Dynasty until the establishment of the Mughal Empire in 1526 there was anarchy and chaos in the region with various Rajput clans fighting for power. Akbar, the Mughal emperor, realised that taxes from Mithila could only be collected if there was a king who could ensure peace there and by 1574 he had succeeded in defeating the Rajput Rajas of Tirhut.

As per local tradition, Akbar summoned Rajpandit Chandrapati Thakur to Delhi and asked him to name one of his sons who could be made caretaker and tax collector for his lands in Mithila. Chandrapati Thakur named his middle son, Mahesh Thakur, whom Akbar then declared as the ruler of Mithila on the day of Ram Navami in 1557. Akbar had been impressed with his "great erudition". Henningham was of the opinion that Akbar made use of Mahesh Thakur by helping the Maithil Brahmins to displace the Rajputs as the local ruling elite.

In 1684, Aurangzeb issued a firman that had the effect of differentiating Raj Darbhanga from other estates of the region. The lands belonging to the Darbhanga family were theirs permanently and became private property rather than belonging to the empire. Raj Darbhanga from this point onwards was legally independent and no longer had to pay tribute to the Nawabs of Bengal. In a report to the Patna Committee of review, Shitab Rai, the naib diwan of Bihar, admitted that the weak state of the empire had rendered many of the zamindars, including Raj Darbhanga, independent. Henningham described Raj Darbhanga as a "semi-independent chieftainship".

=== Consolidation ===
The rulers of Darbhanga in keeping with their elevated status, adopted the Kshatriya surname of Singh and also made use of force when it came to pursuing their interests. They defended their domains against raiders from Nepal and fought battles against local Rajput Rajas.

The Raj Darbhanga also made the Senas of Makwanpur in Nepal their subordinates with the Senas having to pay tribute to the Rajas of Darbhanga.

The Raj Darbhanga used its military to help the Nawabs of Bengal in suppressing rebellions from Bettiah, the chieftains of the Terai and Banjaras although the Rajas of Darbhanga themselves still refused to pay taxes or tribute to the Nawabs. In 1750, Alivardi Khan of Bengal sent a force against Narendra Singh of Darbhanga following his refusal to remit revenue however this force was defeated.

The descendants of Mahesh Thakur gradually consolidated their power in social, agrarian, and political matters and came to be regarded as kings of Madhubani. Darbhanga became the seat of power of the Raj Darbhanga family in 1762. They also had a palace at Rajnagar Bihar situated in Madhubani district. They bought land from local people. They became known as a Khandavala family (the richest landlord).

=== British period ===
For a period of twenty years (1860–1880), Darbhanga Raj was placed under the Court of Wards by the British Raj. During this period, Darbhanga Raj was involved in litigation regarding succession. This litigation decided that the estate was impartible and succession was to be governed by primogeniture. Zamindari estates in the region, including Darbhanga, sought intervention from the Court of Wards from time to time because the stewardship of the British authorities, who invested funds wisely, had a tendency to boost their economic position. The estate had in any event been badly run prior to this time: a complex system influenced by both nepotism and sycophancy had dramatically affected the family's rental income. The bureaucratic system introduced by the Court, whose appointed officials had no ties to the area, resolved the issue although, being focussed entirely on what was best for the owners, it did so without considering the consequences for the tenants.

In 1875, Tirhut Railway was one such privately-owned train service which was introduced by Maharaja Lakshmeshwar Singh of Darbhanga way back in 1874 to serve the drought-hit general public in North Bihar. It is also known as the first private train of the country. Railway Line opened in Darbhanga between Mokama and Darbhanga by Local King Lakshmeshwar Singh of Raj Darbhanga through Tirhut Railway. They were the first in North Bihar

Towards the end of the 19th century, 47 percent of the cropped area of the Darbhanga estate was used for the cultivation of rice. Three percent of total cultivation was given over to indigo at that time, making the estate one of the most important centres in the region for this crop prior to the introduction of chemical dyes.

=== Demise ===
After the independence of India from British rule in 1947, the Government of India initiated several land reform actions and the Zamindari system was abolished. The fortunes of Darbhanga Raj dwindled. The last ruler of Raj Darbhanga was Maharaja Bahadur Sir Kameshwar Singh. He died in 1962 without naming a successor, though many members of the family live on carrying other Maithil Brahmin surnames such as Thakur, Jha, and Shukla.

== Controversy ==
The origin of the royal family of Darbhanga is traced to a grant of the Sarkar of Tirhut to Mahesh Thakur by Akbar. The supporters of the theory that Raj Darbhanga was a kingdom argue that it was held by privy council, that the rulership was a hereditary one with succession governed by primogeniture. The supporters argue that by the end of the 18th century, the Sarkar of Tirhut was practically an independent kingdom until the conquest of Bengal and Bihar by the British. The Raj Darbhanga was also much larger when compared with many of the princely states in Western parts of India, many of whom only contained a population of 200 people. These princely states also lacked the magisterial powers that Raj Darbhanga had. Its annual income of approximately 4 million rupees was also on par with many a princely state.

The opponents of the theory argue that Raj Darbhanga was never a kingdom but rather a zamindari with all the trappings of a princely state. The rulers of Raj Darbhanga were the largest landowners in India, and thus were called Raja, and later Maharaja and Maharajadhiraja. They were given the status of ruling prince.

== Rulers ==
Maharaja Rameshwar Singh Bahadur

Rulers of Darbhanga included:

- Raja Narendra Singh (ruled 1740 to 1760) (died 1760). He died without issue but adopted Pratap Singh, great-great-grandson of Narayan Thakur, as his successor. He is noted for his Battle of Kandarpi Ghat which he fought to free Mithila from Mughal Bengal Subah's rule.

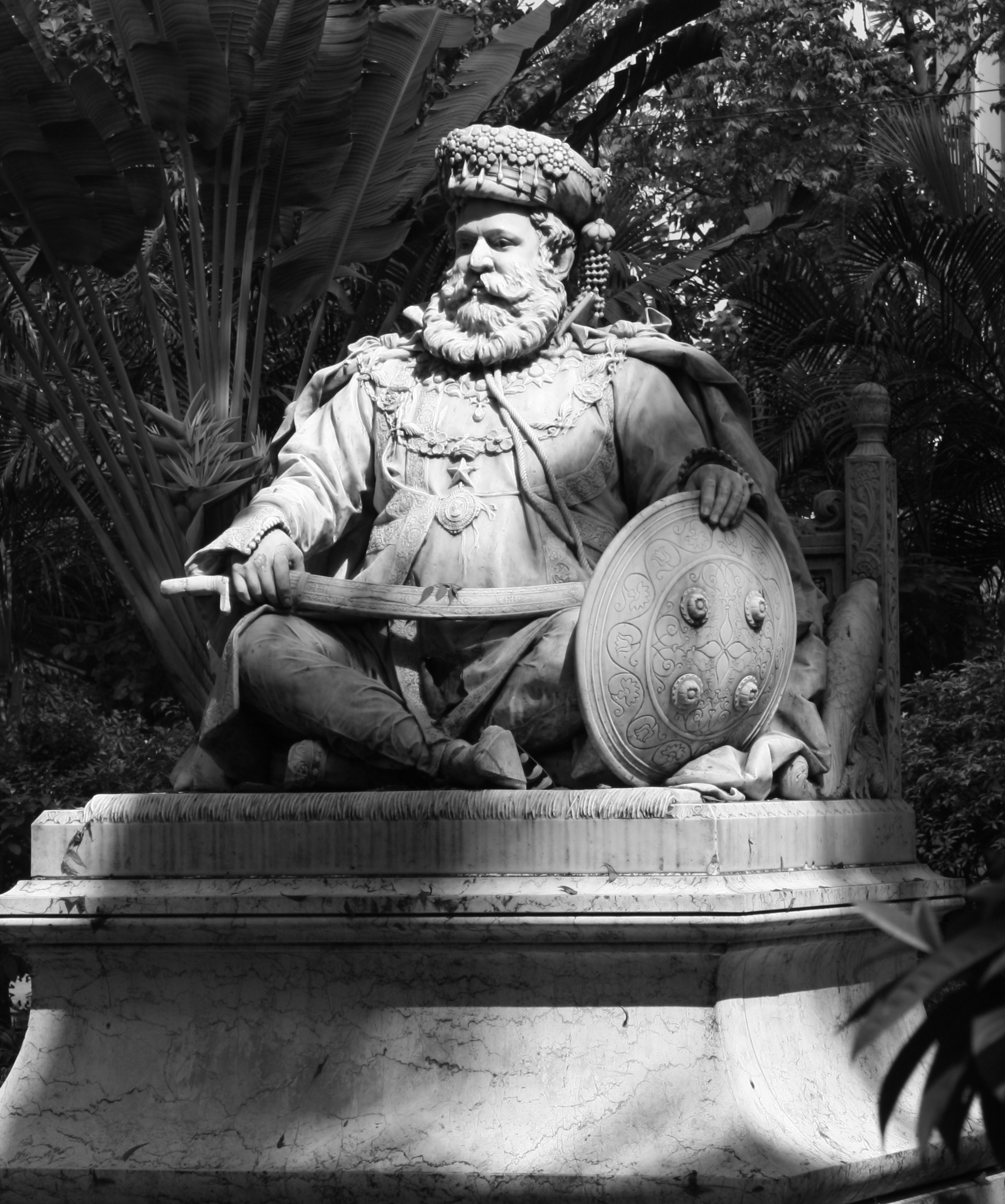
Statue of Maharaja Lakshmeshwar Singh at Dalhousie Square, Kolkata

- Maharaja Lakshmeshwar Singh Bahadur (ruled 1860 to 1898) (born 25 September 1858, died 17 December 1898). He was a philanthropist. His statue (by Edward Onslow Ford) was installed in Calcutta in 1904 at Dalhousie Square as a tribute to him. Lakshmeshwar Singh was only two years old his father's death so Raj Darbhanga was placed under Ward of Court. He was the first Maharaja of Darbhanga to receive a western education, from a British tutor, Chester Macnaghten (who was later the founding principal of the Rajkumar College, Rajkot), and took over the reins of Raj Darbhanga on 25 September 1879 after attaining his majority. On 22 June 1897, he was advanced to the rank of Knight Grand Commander of the Most Eminent Order of the Indian Empire.
- Maharaja Rameshwar Singh Bahadur (ruled 1898 to 1929) (born 16 January 1860, died 3 July 1929). He became Maharaja of Darbhanga after the death of his elder brother Lakshmeshwar Singh, who died without issue. He was appointed to the Indian Civil Service in 1878, serving as assistant magistrate successively at Darbhanga, Chhapra, and Bhagalpur. Maharaja died in July 1929, leaving behind two sons, Maharajkumar Kameshwar Singh and Maharajkumar Vishveshwar Singh
- Maharaja Kameshwar Singh Bahadur (ruled 1929 to the independence of India in 1947) (born 28 November 1907, died 8 November 1962). He was member of the Council of State 1933–1946, member of the Constituent Assembly 1947–1952, and the Member of Parliament (Rajya Sabha-Upper House) 1952–1958 and 1960–1962.

== Palaces ==
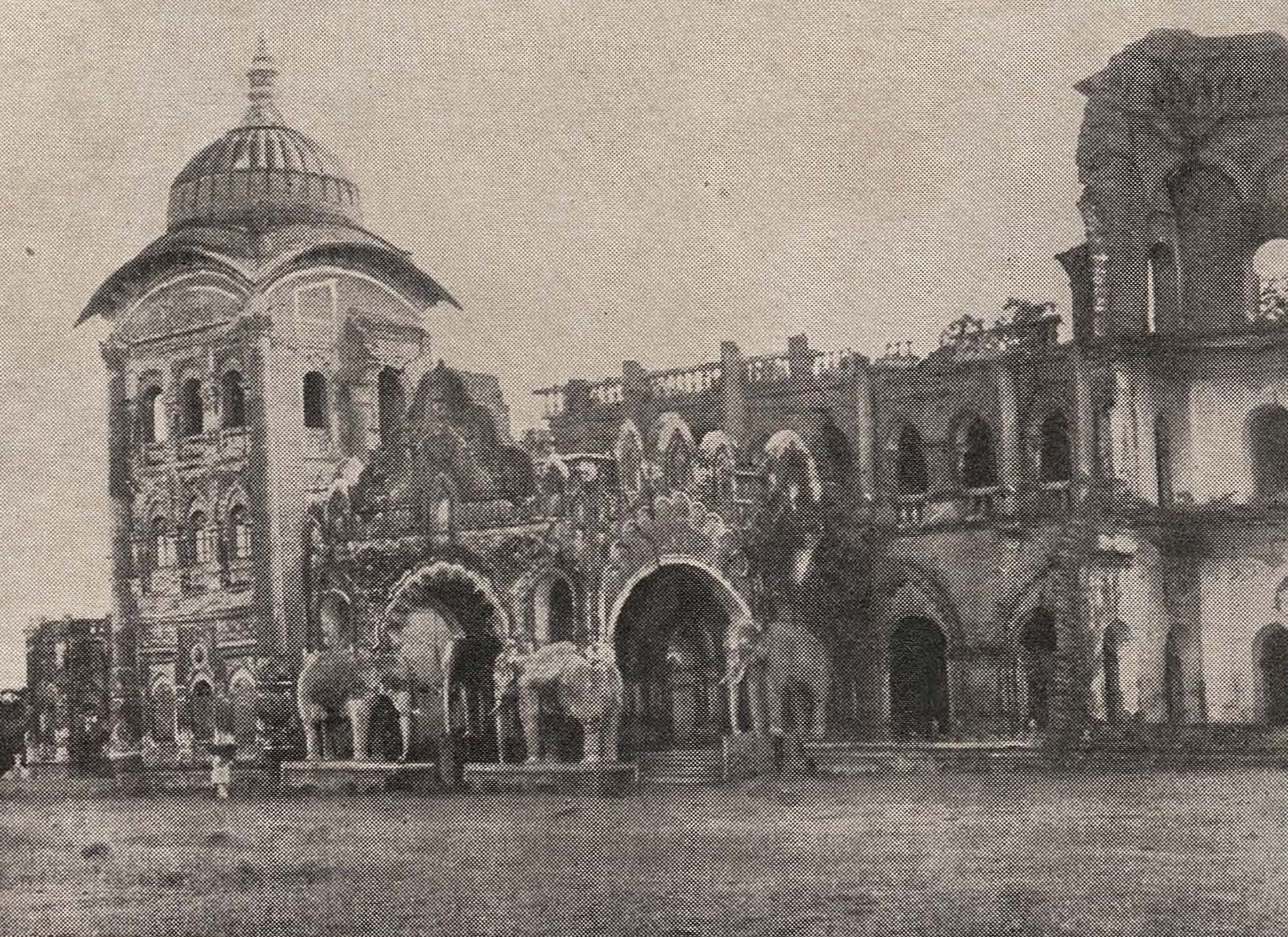
Old Darbhanga Raj Palace, damaged by an earthquake in 1934

Darbhanga has several palaces that were built during the Darbhanga Raj era. They include Nargona Palace, which was constructed after the 1934 Nepal–Bihar earthquake and has since been donated to Lalit Narayan Mithila University, and Lakshmivilas Palace. which was severely damaged in the 1934 earthquake, rebuilt, and later donated to Kameshwar Singh Darbhanga Sanskrit University and Darbhanga Fort.

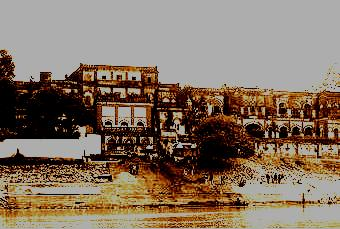
Navlakha Palace (Darbhanga House), Patna

Darbhanga Raj also had several palaces in other towns in India, including the Rajnagar Palace Complex at Rajnagar, in Madhubani District of Bihar, and Darbhanga House (currently the Loreto Convent Tara Hall school) at Kaithu, Shimla.

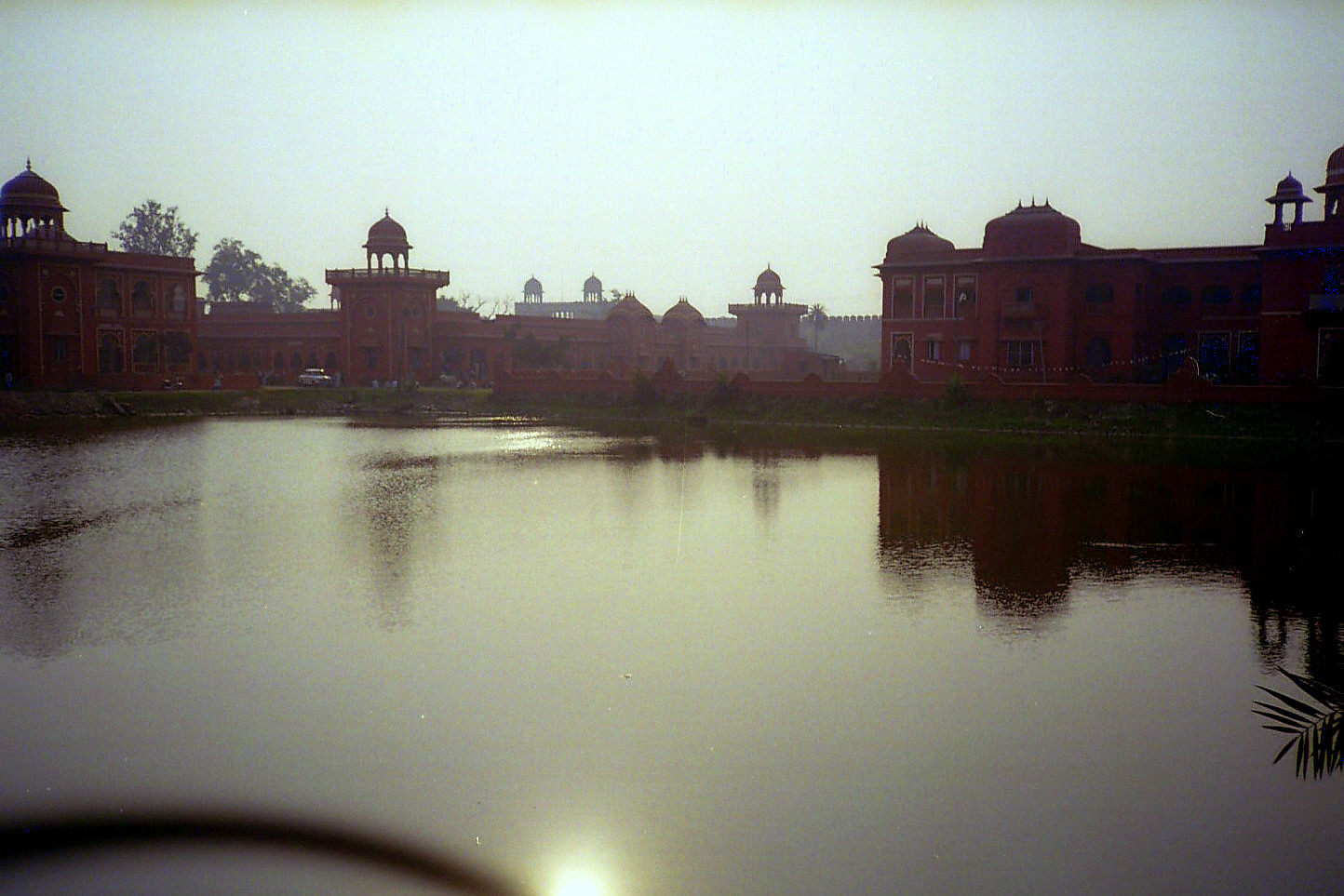
The palace complex at Raj Darbhanga

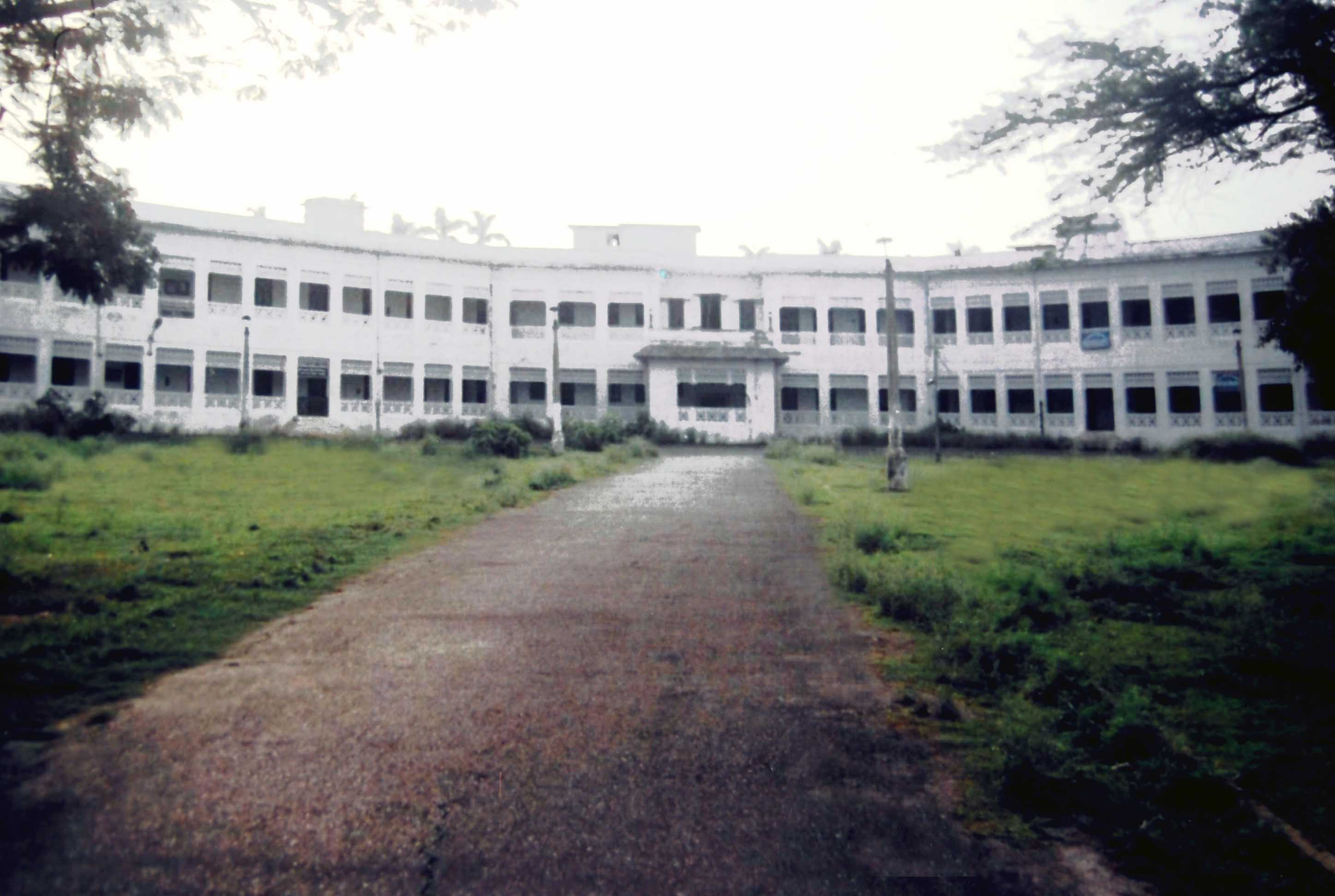
Nargona Palace

== Religion ==
The Maharajas of Darbhanga were devoted to Sanskrit traditions and were supporters of orthodox Hindu practices in both caste and religion. Shiva and Kali were the main deities of the royal family. Even though they were deeply religious, they were also secular in their outlook. The palace area in Darbhanga has three tombs of Muslim saints and a small mosque. The walls of fort at Darbhanga was designed to leave an area so that the mosque is not disturbed. The tomb of a Muslim saint is located next to Anandbagh Palace.

As part of their attempt to reintroduce old Hindu customs such as the study of Vedas and Vedic rites, the Maharaja reintroduced Samavedic study by inviting a few well-versed Samavedins from south India to teach there.

Maharaja Rameshwar Singh established and was general president of Sri Bharat Dharma Mahamandala, a neo-conservative Hindu organisation that sought to make Hindu scriptures available to all castes and women. He was one of the main patrons of Agamanusandhana Samiti, an organisation with the objective of publishing Tantric texts in English and other languages. Many of the works published by the Agamanusandhana Samiti were edited by Sir John Woodroffe.

== Developmental works and philanthropy ==
=== Infrastructure ===
- Raj Darbhanga donated 52 bighas of land for the creation and use of the Muzaffarpur Judgeship.
- Over 1,500 km (930 mi) of roads were constructed by the early part of the 19th century by Raj Darbhanga, of which over 300 km (190 mi) were metalled. This resulted in the expansion of trade as well as larger markets for agricultural produce in the region.
- Kharagpur Lake, a large reservoir, was built on the Man river in Munger District.

=== Education ===
The Darbhanga estate significantly contributed to education in its territory as well as outside. The Darbhanga estate houses the Lalit Narayan Mithila University within its royal complex. The estate also provided substantial financial support to prominent institutions like Banaras Hindu University, Calcutta University, Aligarh Muslim University, and Patna University. It also helped establish Darbhanga Medical College and Hospital.

=== Industry ===
The Darbhanga family supported the establishment of several key industrial ventures, including sugar mills in Sakri, Lohat, Raiyam, and Hasanpur; a spinning mill in Pandaul; the Ashok Paper Mill in Hayaghat; and the Rameshwar Jute Mill in Samastipur. The Darbhanga estate is also historically linked to the beginnings of aviation services in India.

Raj Darbhanga was a pioneer of cross-breeding cattle to improve milk production. A superior milking cow breed called Hansi was introduced by Raj Darbhanga. The cow was a cross between local cows and the Jersey breed.

=== Donation during 1962 war ===
One of the most notable public service acts by the Darbhanga royals occurred during the 1962 India-China War, when they donated 15 maunds (about 600 kg) of gold to support the government. Additionally, the royal family contributed three aircraft and 90 acres of land for the development of an airport.

== Cultural influence ==
=== Music ===
Darbhanga became one of the prominent centres of Hindustani classical music from the late 18th century. The kings of Raj Darbhanga were great patrons of music, art, and culture. Several famous musicians were associated with Raj Darbhanga. Prominent amongst them were Ustad Bismillah Khan, Gauhar Jaan, Pandit Ram Chatur Mallik, Pandit Rameshwar Pathak, and Pandit Siya Ram Tiwari. Raj Darbhanga was a main patron of Dhrupad, a vocal style in Hindustani classical music. One of the three major schools of Dhrupad today is known as Darbhanga Gharana.

Raj Darbhanga supported Murad Ali Khan, one of the foremost sarod players of his time. Khan is credited with being the first person to use metal strings and metal fingerboard plates on his sarod, which has today become the standard.

Raj Darbhanga had its own symphony orchestra and police band. There was a circular structure in front of Manokamna Temple, which was known as the bandstand. The band used to play music there in the evening. Today the floor of the bandstand is the only part still extant.

=== Sanskrit research ===
Mithila Sanskrit Shodh Sansthan, a research institute related to Sanskrit and Vedic learning was established by the last Maharaja Kameshwar Singh.

=== Sports ===
Raj Darbhanga promoted various sports activities. The polo ground in Laheriasarai was a major centre for polo in pre-independence times in Bihar. The winner of a major polo tournament in Calcutta is awarded the Darbhanga Cup.

Raja Bishweshwar Singh was one of the founding members of the All India Football Federation, the prime governing body for football in India. Raja Bahadur, along with Rai Bahadur Jyoti Prasad Singh of Hariharpur Estate, were the Honorary Secretaries of the federation upon its inception in 1935.

== See also ==
- List of rulers of Mithila
- Zamindars of Bihar
- List of Brahmin dynasties and states
- Tirhut Sarkar
