= Rajnagar Kali Mandir =

Kali Mandir in Mithila

- राजनगर काली मंदिर
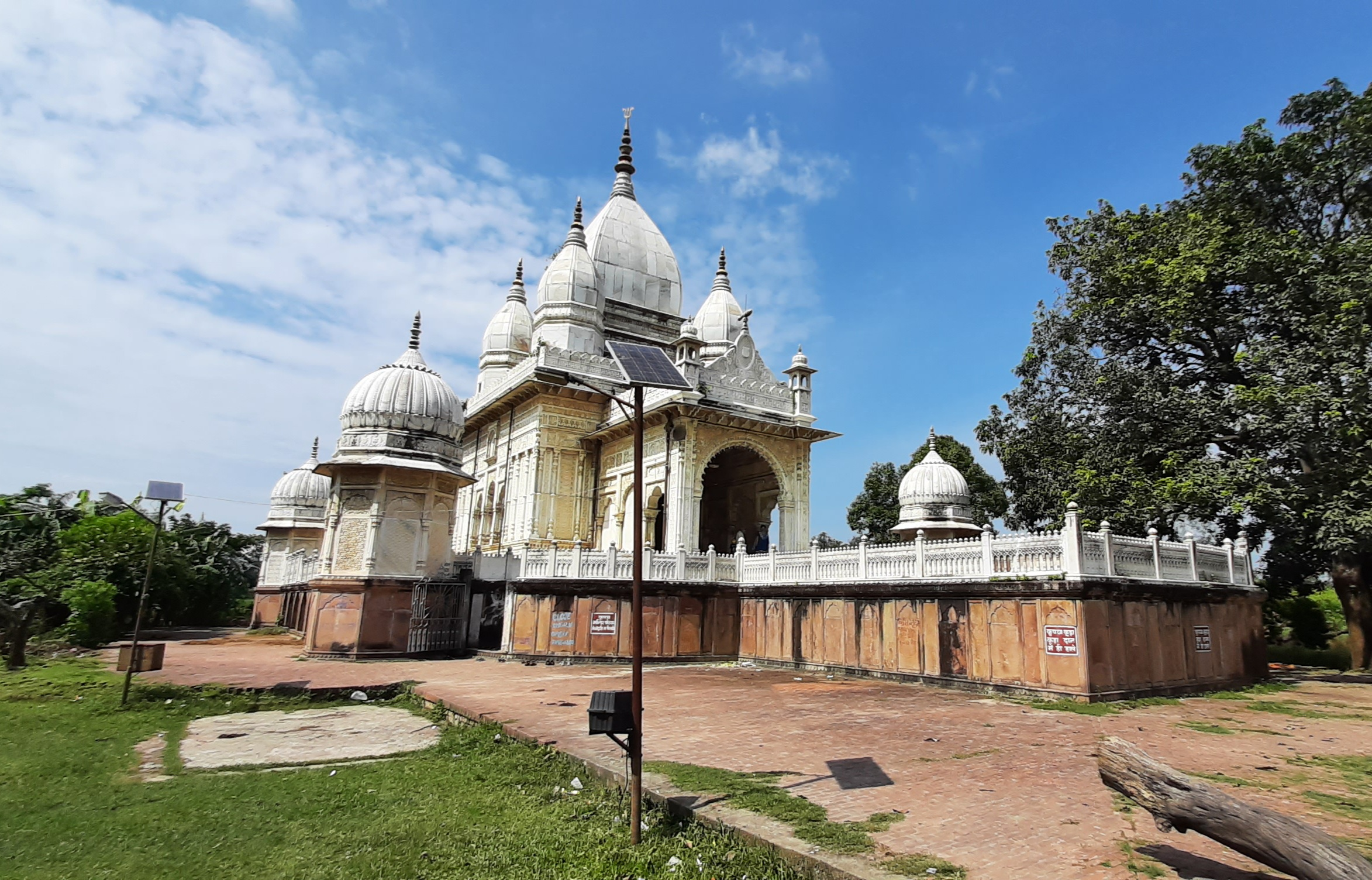
- View of the Rajnagar Kali Mandir made by white marble

Religion
- Affiliation: Hinduism
- District: Madhubani district
- Deity: Goddess Kali

Location
- Location: Rajnagar Palace, Madhubani, Mithila region
- State: Bihar
- Interactive map of Rajnagar Kali Mandir
- Coordinates: 26.4048054°N 86.1717377°E

Rajnagar Kali Mandir (Maithili: राजनगर काली मंदिर) is a Hindu temple dedicated to Goddess Kali in the Mithila region of Bihar. It is located at the campus of the Rajnagar Palace in the Madhubani district of Bihar in India. It is made by white marble and elephant ivory. It is one of the major tourist destinations in the Mithila region of Bihar.

== History ==
The Rajnagar Kali Mandir was built during the period of Maharajadhiraja Rameshwar Singh in Mithila. It is said that Maharajadhiraja Rameshwar Singh was a great devotee of the Goddess Kali.

Maharajadhiraj Rameshwar Singh

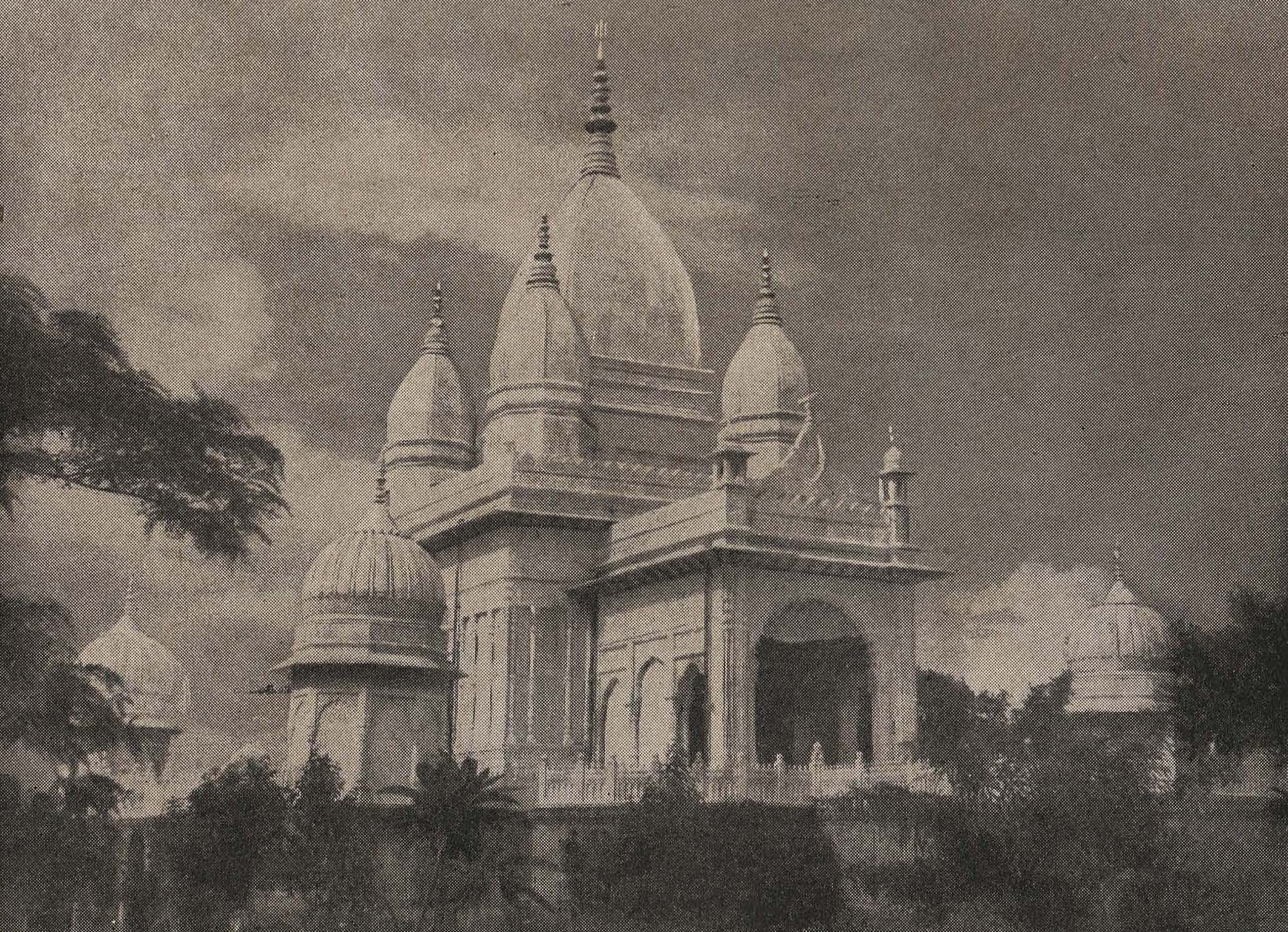
Older view of the Rajnagar Kali Mandir

Goddess Kali was the Kuldevi of the Darbhanga Maharaja in Mithila. It is said that wherever the Darbhanga Maharaja had a palace, a grand temple of the Kuldevi Kali was also built there.

== Description ==
The Rajnagar Kali Mandir is also called as Tajmahal of the Mithila region. According to the history of the Rajnagar Palace, the King Rameshwar Singh had ordered 6 statues of Goddess Kali made in Ajmer. The cost of those statues was twenty eight thousands Indian rupees. Since the temple was built using white marble, so it is compared with the Tajmahal of Agra. It is an important tourist destination of the tourism in Mithila.
