= Mithila Sanskrit Shodh Sansthan =

Research institute in Darbhanger, india

- मिथिला संस्कृत शोध संस्थान
- Other name: Mithila Sanskrit Research Institute
- Former name: Mithila Sanskrit Snaatakottar Adhyayan Evam Shodh Sansthan
- Date of inauguration: 21 November 1951
- Inaugurated by: Dr Rajendra Prasad
- Type: Research institute
- Established: 16 June 1951
- Founder: Maharaja Kameshwar Singh
- Affiliations: Higher Education Department, Government of Bihar
- Religious affiliation: Hinduism
- Location: Kabraghat, Darbhanga, India
- Campus: Urban
- Area of the campus: 62 bighas
- Number of manuscripts - 12,377+
- Alternative names: Mithila Sanskrit Postgraduate Studies and Research Institute; Mithila Research Institute; Mithila Institute

Mithila Sanskrit Shodh Sansthan (Maithili: मिथिला संस्कृत शोध संस्थान, English: Mithila Sanskrit Research Institute) (Abbreviation: MSSS) is a Indian state research institute located in Darbhanga, Bihar, dedicated to Sanskrit and Vedic learning, as well as the preservation of the cultural heritage of the Mithila region. It is also known as Mithila Sanskrit Snaatakottar Adhyayan Evam Shodh Sansthan (translates to Mithila Sanskrit Postgraduate Studies and Research Institute), and informally as the Mithila Research Institute or Mithila Institute. The institution was established on 16 June 1951 through the initiative of Dr. Rajendra Prasad, who later became independent India’s first president. The land and funds were donated by Maharaja Kameshwar Singh of the Raj Darbhanga. Prasad, by then President of India, formally inaugurated it on 21 November 1951. After it opened, the institute became a centre for the study and preservation of Mithila's culture.

The institute has over 12,377 Sanskrit manuscripts, some nearly a thousand years old, covering jurisprudence, Nyaya, astrology, Mimamsa and Ayurveda.

== Manuscripts ==
The Mithila Sanskrit Shodh Sansthan holds several old manuscripts of Sanskrit and Vedic learning. A rare treasure of centuries old knowledge is preserved here. Numerous manuscripts related to subjects such as jurisprudence, Nyaya Shastra, astrology, philosophies, spirituality, Mimansa and Vedic literature, Ayurveda, etc are preserved here. Most of these manuscripts are centuries old, which represent the rich intellectual tradition of the Mithila region in the Indian subcontinent. Thousands of original manuscripts are stored in the institute. The collection of the manuscripts also contain thousand years old manuscripts. But due to lack of proper management, these manuscripts are getting destroyed gradually.

According to the Director in-charge of the institute, Dr Rajdev Prasad, the institute preserves manuscripts dating back nearly a thousand years, that includes the original texts on Nyaya, Darshana, and Mimamsa written on bhojpatra (birch bark), taadaptra (palm leaves), and baanspatra (bamboo leaves).

== History ==
The institute was established at Kabraghat on 62 bighas of land donated by the Maharaj Kameshwar Singh of Raj Darbhanga. After the establishment of the institute, it became an important centre for the preservation and research of the cultural heritage of Mithila. It is said that before 1970 the prestige of the institute in the matter of Sanskrit manuscripts was same that of IITs had in the field of science, technology and mathematics. During this period, researchers from several countries of the world like America, Britain, China, Bhutan, Germany and Japan were coming here to do research in the field of Sanskrit literature and Vedic learning.

Later, the institute suffered negligence from the officials. After 1970s, due to years of negligence and lack of resources, its condition deteriorated. Over the years of negligence, the institute failed to attract research scholars in the recent times.

== Revival initiative and upgradation ==
=== Preservation efforts ===
In the year 2022, the Indian National Trust for Art and Cultural Heritage (INTACH) of Lucknow, started conservation of the thousand years old manuscripts kept at the institute by using special paper imported from Germany. The INTACH preserves manuscripts on the special German paper, that makes the paper of the manuscripts new and does not deteriorate for the next hundred years. In this way, the manuscripts will be preserved for the next hundred years. According to the Director in-charge of the institute Dr Rajdev Prasad, the conservation of the thousand years old rare manuscripts by the team of INTACH Lucknow, was initiated on the instructions of the Education Department of the Bihar Government. Initially, thousand pages of the rare manuscripts were to be preserved

=== Modernization and funding ===
On 11 January 2025, the chief minister Nitish Kumar made an announcement for the modernization and preservation of the institute, during his Pragati Yatra in the Darbhanga district. In 2026, the Government of Bihar has approved a fund of ₹ 48.6 crore for the development and renovation of the institute. The new plan for the development and renovation of the institute includes a modern manuscript building, guest house, and dormitory. The officials are preparing to resume teaching and research activities in the institute. It is expected that the resumption of the programs MA, PhD, and D.Litt, in the institute will improve the educational activities and employments in the region. The Rajya Sabha MP Sanjay Kumar Jha, has taken initiative to regain the glorious form of the institution.

=== Institutional collaborations and national recognition ===
On 19 May 2026, Sanjay Kumar Jha urged the Union minister of culture and tourism G S Shekhawat to include the institute in the Gyan Bharatam Mission. It will give the rare and historical manuscripts preserved in the institute a national recognition. In July 2026, the Oxford Sanskrit Text Society (OSTS) requested for institutional collaboration to conserve, publish, and research the 12,377 rare Sanskrit manuscripts kept at institute. These ancient documents pertain to various fields of Indian knowledge, including Ayurveda, philosophy, astronomy, astrology, grammar, and literature.

== See also ==
- Darbhanga
- Sanskrit and Vedic learning in Mithila
- Raj Darbhanga
