= Maharaja Narendra Singh =

Maharaja of Darbhanga (died 1760)

- Reign: 1740 - 1760
- Predecessor: Maharaja Bishnu Singh
- Successor: Maharaja Pratap Singh
- Died: 1760
- House: Raj Darbhanga
- Father: Maharaja Raghu Singh
- Religion: Hinduism

Maharaja Narendra Singh (died 1760) was the Maithil Brahmin Maharaja and principal landowner of Darbhanga in the Mithila region, India. He belonged to the Khandavala Rajavansh of Raj Darbhanga. He is famous for his role in the Battle of Kandarpi Ghat in 1753 against the Mughal Bengal Subah of the then ruling Alivardi Khan, Nawab of Bengal.

The history of Maharaja Narendra Singh and the battle of Kandarpi Ghat fought by him is described in writings and poems of his court-poet Lalkavi.

== See also ==
- Shiva Simha Singh
- Chandesvara Thakur
- Lakshmeshwar Singh
