= Darbhanga Fort =

Historic fortress in Darbhanga, Bihar, India

- Raj Quila
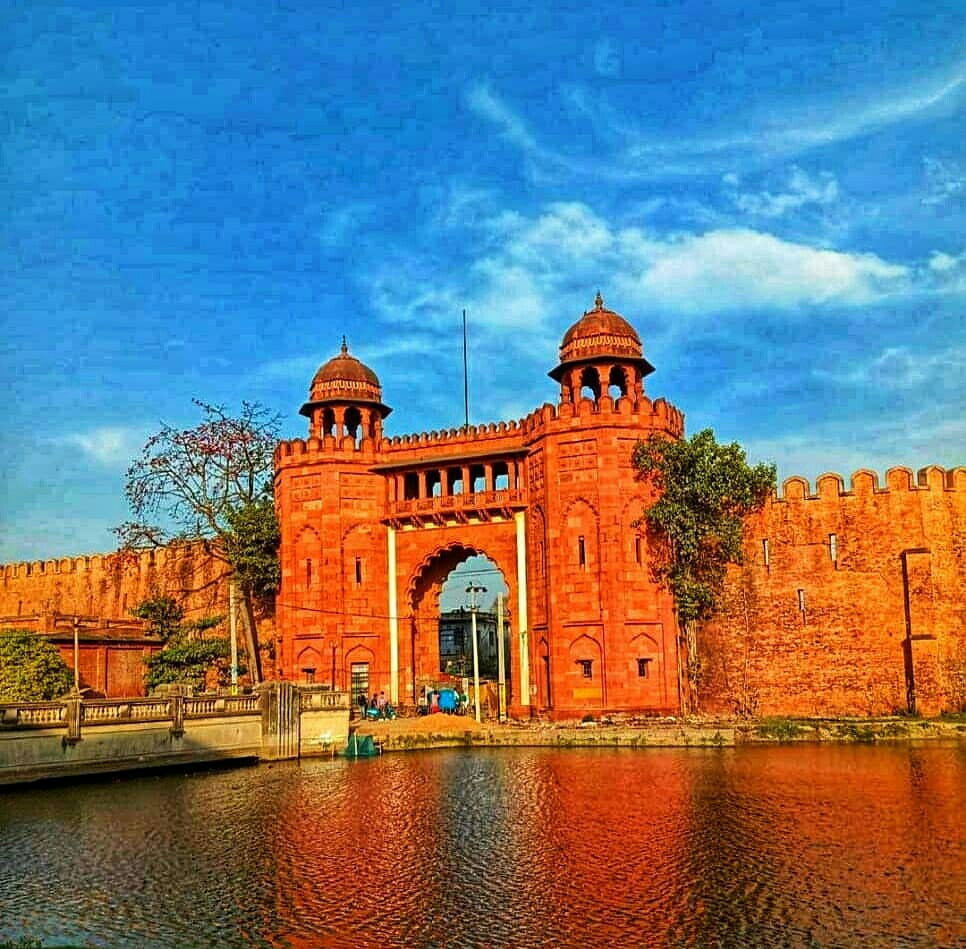
- Façade of the Darbhanga Fort

- Location in Darbhanga, Bihar, India Darbhanga Fort (India)
- 26.1607°N 85.8941°E
- Location: Darbhanga, Bihar, India

History
- Built: 1934–1947

Site notes
- Height: 18–33 metres

Darbhanga Fort, is a monument located in the city of Darbhanga in Bihar, India. It is also known as Rambagh Fort because it is situated in Rambagh Palace inside the fort. It is built by Maithili Brahman rulers. Rambagh campus is surrounded by walls and covers about 85 acres (34 ha).

== History ==
Darbhanga Fort, also known as Raj Quila, was built in the early 20th century by Maharaja Sir Kameshwar Singh of Darbhanga. It was once the stately abode of the Darbhanga Raj family. The fort symbolises the rich Maithili culture. It was built up using red bricks and the walls are 1 km long and 500 meters wide. The fort's design was influenced by the Mughal architecture of Fatehpur Sikri, particularly the monumental character of its gateways.

== See also ==
- Raj Darbhanga
- Zamindars of Bihar
- Rohtasgarh Fort
- Munger Fort
- Anand Bagh Palace
- Nargona Palace
