= Darbhanga Aviation =

Darbhanga Aviation was a private Indian airline started by Maharaja Kameshwar Singh of Darbhanga. Darbhanga Aviation was started in 1950 (76 years ago) and became defunct by 1962 (64 years ago).

== History ==
The airline started operations after the Second World War when it had purchased three former military Douglas DC-3 aircraft.

== Accidents and incidents ==
- 1 March 1954 – Douglas DC-3, registered VT-DEM, was destroyed in an accident near Calcutta. The aircraft was on a scheduled domestic Service out of Calcutta, India, when it crashed on takeoff. The No.1 engine of the DC-3 caught fire immediately after takeoff from Calcutta runway 19R. The aircraft failed to gain height, stalled and crashed into trees, 3330 feet past the runway end. Two of the eight passengers, and all three crew members aboard the DC-3 were killed in the crash. The six surviving passengers were all critically injured. Although the engine fire was the primary cause of the crash, the pilot was also cited for a delay in feathering the engine, and the extreme nose up altitude of the plane during takeoff. Both of those factors contributed to the downing of the plane.
- 24 May 1962 – Douglas DC-3, registered VT-AYG, crashed near Rajshahi in Bangladesh. The cause of crash has been attributed to fatigue failure of the No. 1 engine forcing the crew of the DC-3 to continue on a single engine (No. 2). After a while the remaining engine lost power due to overheating resulting in crash of the aircraft.
