= The Indian Nation =

Independent nationalist daily newspaper

The Indian Nation was an independent nationalist daily newspaper published by Newspaper & Publications Pvt. Ltd. from Patna, capital of Bihar state, India. The newspaper started publication in 1931. The publication was briefly suspended in 1932 and was resumed in 1943. It was owned by Maharaja of Darbhanga, Maharja Sir Kameshwar Singh.

The Indian Nation virtually held a monopoly in English-language newspapers published in Bihar until the mid-1980s. However, its sales declined due to competition from The Times of India, the Hindustan Times, and other newspapers. Problems were further aggravated by use of old technology in printing, labour union problems, and financial problems. During the 1990s, its publication continued intermittently. The Indian Nation ceased publication in the late 1990s.

Upendra Acharya of Indian Nation was also President of the Indian Newspaper Society (INS) during 1958–1959.

The Aryavarta used to be the Indian Nation's Hindi edition. Most prominent editor of Aryavarta was Shri Braj Kishore Jha Bhaskar. This group also published a Maithili periodical called Mithila Mihir.
