= Kameshwar Singh =

Maharaja of Darbhanga from 1929–1952

Maharajadhiraj Kameshwar Singh Bahadur
- Maharaja of Darbhanga
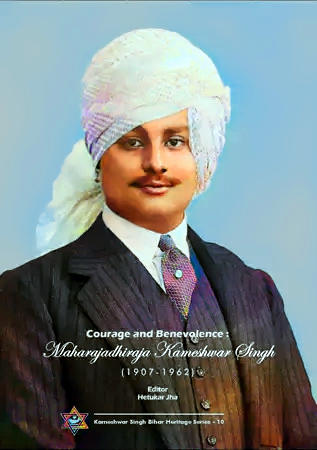
- Maharajah Kameshwar singh in Western Attire with a Mithila Safa on head
- Reign: 1929 - 1952
- Predecessor: Maharaja Rameshwar Singh
- Born: 28 November 1907; Darbhanga, Bengal Presidency, British India
- Died: 1 October 1962 (aged 54); Darbhanga, Bihar, India
- Spouse: Maharani Adhirani Kameshwari Priya Sahiba of Mangrauni Maharani Adhirani Kamsundari Kalyani Sahiba
- House: Raj Darbhanga
- Father: Maharaja Rameshwar Singh

Maharaja Sir Kameshwar Singh Goutam Bahadur, K.C.I.E. (28 November 1907 – 1 October 1962) was the Maharaja of Darbhanga. He held his title over his family estates in the Mithila region from 1929 – 1952, when such titles were abolished following the Independence of India. He had a sister named Lakshmi Daiji.

== Patronage of sports ==
He was patron of the All India Football Federation which was founded at Darbhanga in 1935. He had started the Darbhanga Cup tournament at Calcutta (Kolkata) in which teams from Lahore, Peshawar, Madras (Chennai), Delhi, Jaipur, Mumbai (Bombay), Afghanistan and England participated. He built 4 stadiums.

== Biography ==
He was the son of Maharaja Sir Rameshwar Singh Goutam, the King of Darbhanga Raj. He was born on 28 November 1907 at Darbhanga in a Maithil Brahmin family. He succeeded, to the throne of his estate of Darbhanga Raj, upon death of his father on 3 July 1929.

He was a member of the team that visited London for the First round Table and the Second Round Table Conference held in 1930–31.

He was a member of the Council of State for years 1933–1946, member of the Constituent Assembly of India for years 1947–1952. He was elevated from C.I.E. and made a Knight Commander of the Most Eminent Order of the Indian Empire on 1 January 1933.

After, the 1934 Nepal–Bihar earthquake, he started construction of a fort called Raj Quila, to commemorate the memory, when the British Raj announced to confer the title of "Native Prince" to Maharaja Kameshwar Singh. The contract was given to a Calcutta-based firm and work was on in full swing in 1939–40. Three sides of the fort were constructed with all the protective measures till work was stayed because of litigation and a stay order from the high court. With the abolition of native royalties by the Indian government post-Independence, work on the fort was eventually abandoned.

After independence of India, he was elected as Member of Parliament (Rajya Sabha) 1952–1958 as a Jharkhand Party candidate and got re-elected again in 1960 and was a member of Rajya Sabha till his death in 1962.

He also was the President the Maithil Mahasabha from 1929–1962. and also President of the Sri Bharat Dharma Mahamandal.

He was lifetime president of Bihar Landholders' Association and also served as the President of the All-India Landholders' Association and Bengal Landholders' Association. Further, he was elected as the president of the Bihar United Party of pre-independence era. and guided its policy during the critical years of Agrarian disquiet in Bihar.

== Philanthropist ==
He was the first person in India to get a bust of Mahatma Gandhi made, by celebrated artist Clare Sheridan, cousin of Winston Churchill. The bust was presented to the Viceroy of India, Lord Linlithgow, to be displayed in Government House (now Rashtrapati Bhawan). This was acknowledged by Mahatma Gandhi in a letter to Lord Linlithgow in 1940.

He served a pro-vice-chancellor of Benaras Hindu University, to which his father Sir Rameshwar Singh was a major benefactor. He chaired the special meeting in 1939, when Madan Mohan Malviyaji voluntarily stepped down as Chancellor of BHU and Radhakrishnan was unanimously elected to the post.

In 1930, Sir Kameshwar Singh, donated Rupees One Lakh and twenty-thousand to University of Patna for encouragement of vernacular language.

After, independence of India, in 1951, when the Mithila Snatkottar Shodh Sansthan (the Mithila Post-Graduate Research Institute), located at Kabraghat, was established on the initiative of Dr. Rajendra Prasad, first President of India at that time, Maharaja Kameshwar Singh donated a building along with 60 acres (240,000 m2) of land and a garden of mango and litchi trees located beside the Bagmati river in Darbhanga to this institution. He in a major act of philanthropy, gifted in a ceremony on 30 March 1960, his Anand Bagh Palace to start a Sanskrit University, now named after him as Kameshwar Singh Darbhanga Sanskrit University.

== Industrialist ==
Maharaja Kameshwar Singh inherited investments in businesses and industries begun by his father, who was also the co-founder of Bengal National Bank in 1908.

Kameshwar Singh, who inherited some of his father's legacy, further expanded his stake in varied industries. He controlled 14 businesses producing sugar, jute, cotton, coal, railway, iron and steel, aviation, print media, electricity and other products.

Some of the major companies controlled by him were : Darbhanga Aviations (an airlines company owned by him); The Indian Nation and Aryavatra – newspaper, Thacker Spink & Co; a publishing company; Ashok Paper Mills, Sakri Sugar Factory and Pandaul Sugar Factory, Rameshwar Jute Mills, Darbhanga Dairy Farms, Darbhanga Marketing Co, Darbhanga Lahoriasrai Electric Supply Corporation, Walford, an automobile showroom at Calcutta. Further, he held controlling or major stakes, among others, in British India Corporation, which owned several mills in Kanpur & other parts, Octavius Steel (a large conglomerate having varied interests in Steel, Jute and Tea); Villiers & Co (colliery), through his company, Darbhanga Investments.

== Memorials ==
- Maharaja Kameshwar Singh Hospital, Darbhanga
- Maharaja Sir Kameshwar Singh Library, Darbhanga
- Kameshwar Singh Darbhanga Sanskrit University, Darbhanga
- Maharaniadhirani Kam Sundari, widow and third wife of the Sir Kameshwar Singh, established the Maharajadhiraja Kameshwar Singh Kalyani Foundation by a deed of trust in 1989 in his memory for charitable purposes.
