= Battle of Kandarpi Ghat =

Date	4–7 October 1753
Location	Kandarpi Ghat, Harna Village, Mithila region, India
Result	Khandwala victory

Belligerents
Raj Darbhanga (Khandwala dynasty)	Nawab of Bengal

Commanders and leaders
Narendra Singh; Mitrajit Singh; Umrao; Hala Roy; Keso Shah; Ajit Shah; Ghariram; Sher Khan; Jafar Khan	Bhikhari Mahtha; Zainuddin Khan; Ram Narayan Singh; Salabat Jang (Nephew of Alivardi Khan); Bhakt Singh; Namdar Khan

Strength
Unknown	Unknown

Casualties and losses
Low	Heavy
- Alivardi Khan's Army got defeated by Mithila Naresh.

The Battle of Kandarpi Ghat occurred between the Nawab of Bengal and Raj Darbhanga in October 1753. Raj Darbhanga headed by Maithil Brahmin king Maharaja Narendra Singh clashed against forces of Bengal Subah led by Bhikhari Mahtha, an official of Alivardi Khan and emerged victorious.

== Background ==
After the decline of Pala Empire in the gangetic plains, it was ruled by likes Karnat and Oiniwar dynasty. Later, much of bihar was ruled by smaller chieftains, otherwise known as "tulakdars" and "zamindars" . These chiefs maintained their standing armies and were continually at arms, fighting for dominance against both the state, that was overlord to them and other zamindars that bordered them.

=== Relations with Bengal subah ===
Though the Nawabs of Bengal were governors of Bihar as well, and had rights to collect revenue from it. However this was only on paper and wasn't in practice. Though, Bihar had considerable potential to provide the Subah with huge amounts of revenue, in reality the Nawabs weren't able to extract it. Between the years 1742 to 1751, for about decade Bengal Subah was invaded by the Marathas, led by Raghuji I . These invasions were sought to extract tribute and loot from Bengal and utterly damaged the prestige and economic prosperity of the Subah. Alivardi Khan who sued for peace to Raghoji I was in a great need of revenue to run the state machinery and hence, led another series of expeditions to reduce Bihar into a tributary, "de facto". In the year 1753, Alivardi Khan demanded Maharaja Narendra Singh of Darbhanga Raj to pay tribute, when this demand was declined, he sent his general named Bhikhari Mahtha to lead military operations against Darbhanga.

== Battle ==
The battle started on 4 October 1753. Initially Bhikhari Mahtha gained an edge over the Maithili forces but on, 7 October 1753, Maharaja Narendra Singh personally held the frontline while riding his war elephant named "Gajendra". The battle was hard-fought, where both of the sides fought bravely and stubbornly, with both traditional weapons and matchlocks. Army of Raj Darbhanga used matchlocks for the first time in warfare, amidst the fight Maharaja Narendra Singh's elephant was slained under him. One of the Maithili commander, "Umrao singh" was killed in action after slaying his counterpart, "Salawat Roy". The Maithili troops, along with their allies from various zamindaris across Bihar, presented their utmost might upon Nawab's forces, successfully routing them. A highly interesting account of this battle is also described in the poetic composition Kandarpi Ghat Larai of the Maithili poet Lalkavi.

== Victory Pillar ==
A Vijaya Stambh i.e., a victory pillar has been erected and constructed to commemorate this event by the efforts of Indian Government at Kandarpi Ghat, Harna.

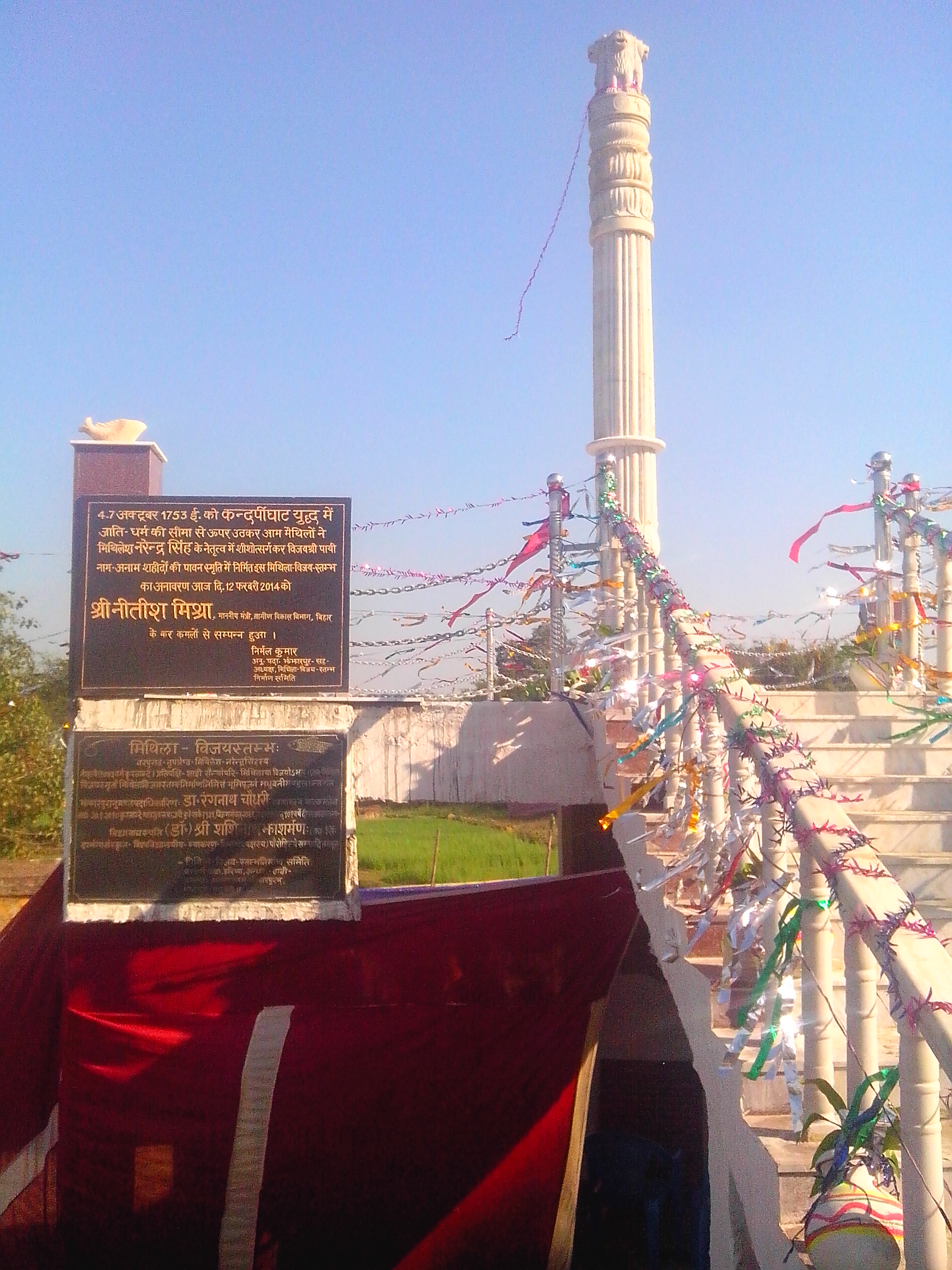
Kandarpi Ghat Mithila Vijay Stambh

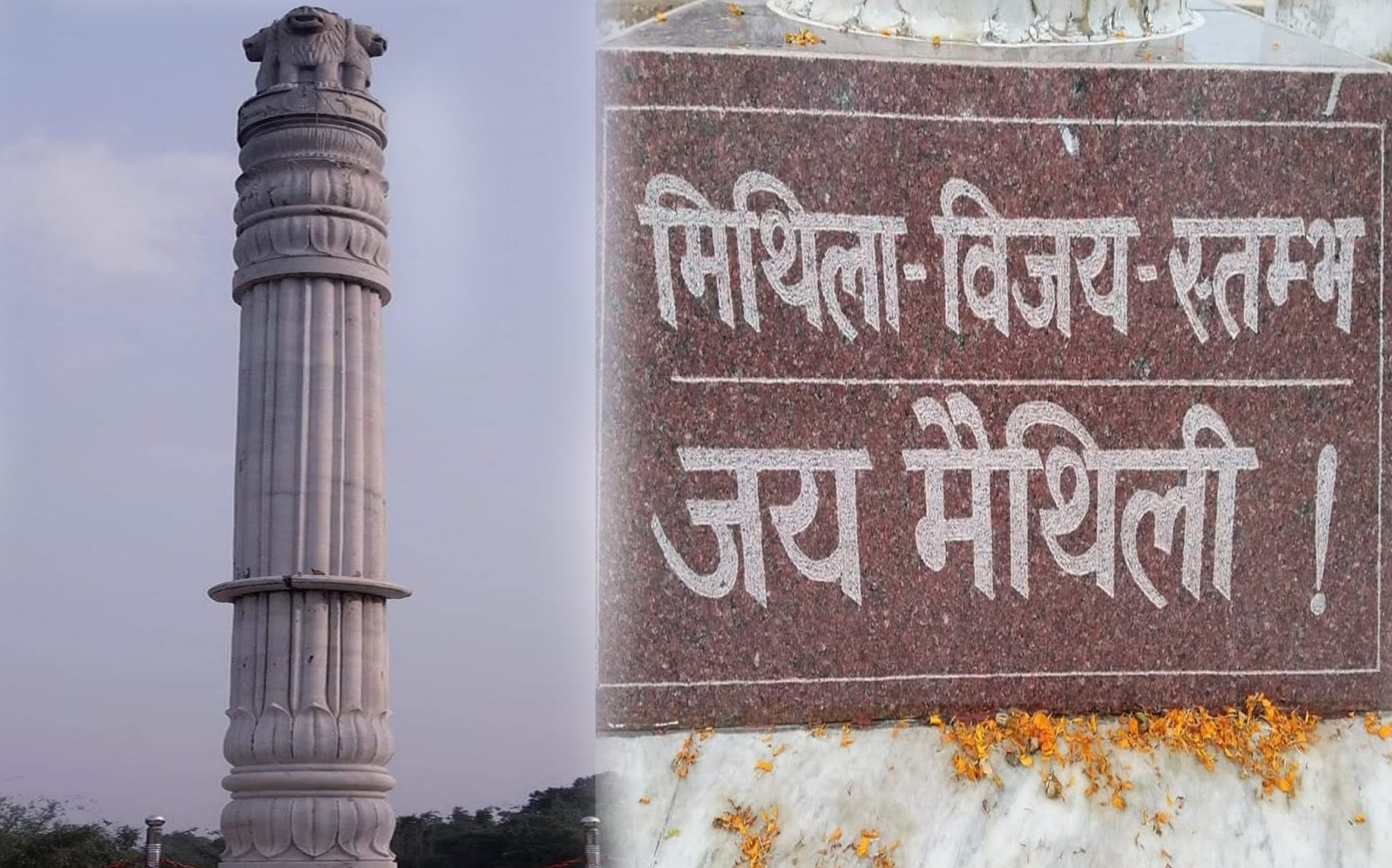
Mithila Victory Pillar for this event.

== See also ==
- Shiva Simha Singh
- Chandesvara Thakur
- Mir Jafar
