= Rajnagar, Bihar =

Rajnagar
- Village
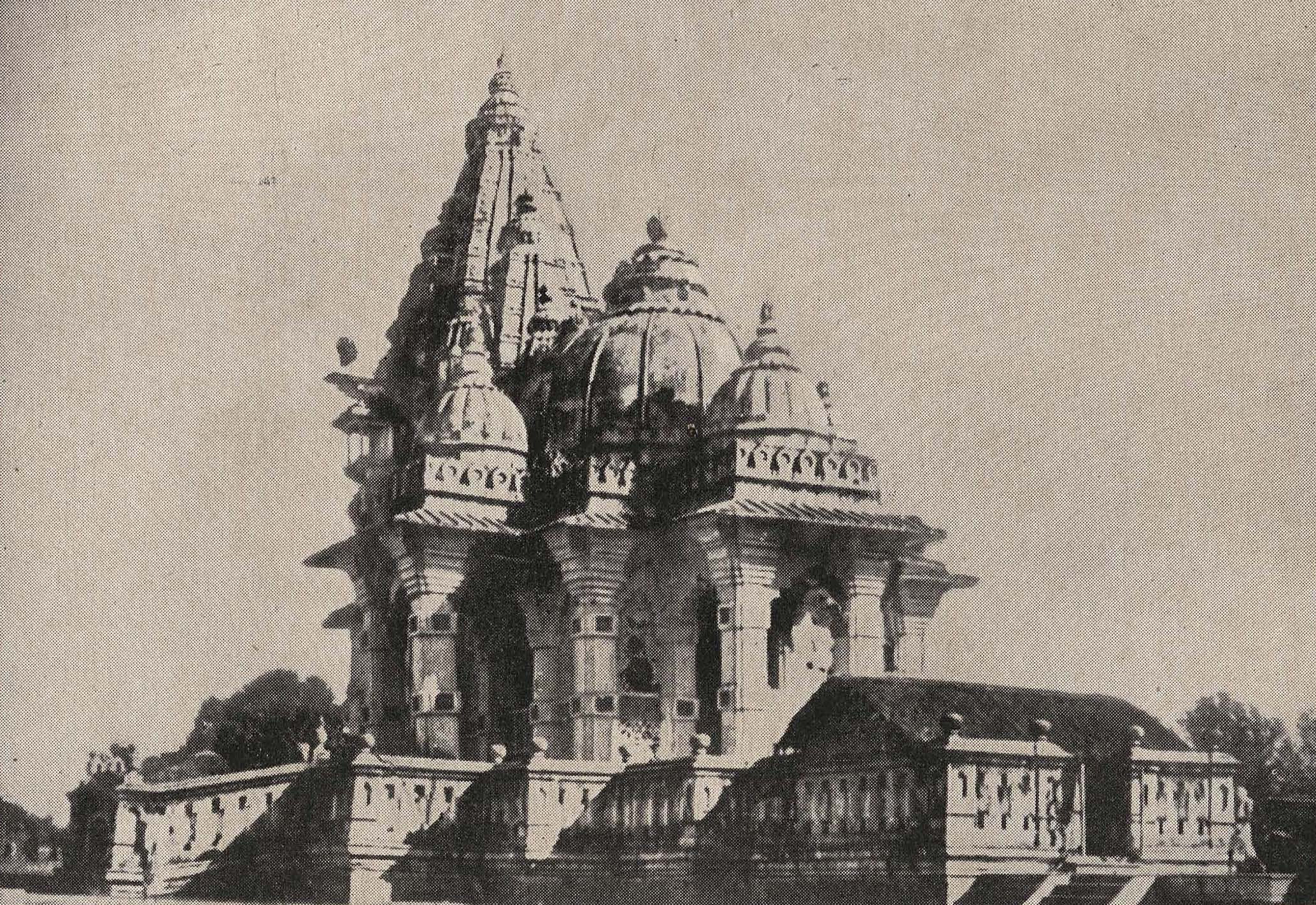
- Shiva Temple at Rajnagar before the earthquake, 1934

- Location in Bihar, India Rajnagar (India)
- Coordinates: 26.3958°N 86.1608°E
- Country: India
- State: Bihar
- Region: Mithila
- District: Madhubani

Government
  - Type: Madhubani Municipal Corporation

Languages
  - Official: Maithili, Hindi, Urdu
- Time zone: UTC+5:30 (IST)
- PIN: 847235
- ISO 3166 code: IN-BR
- Website: madhubani.nic.in

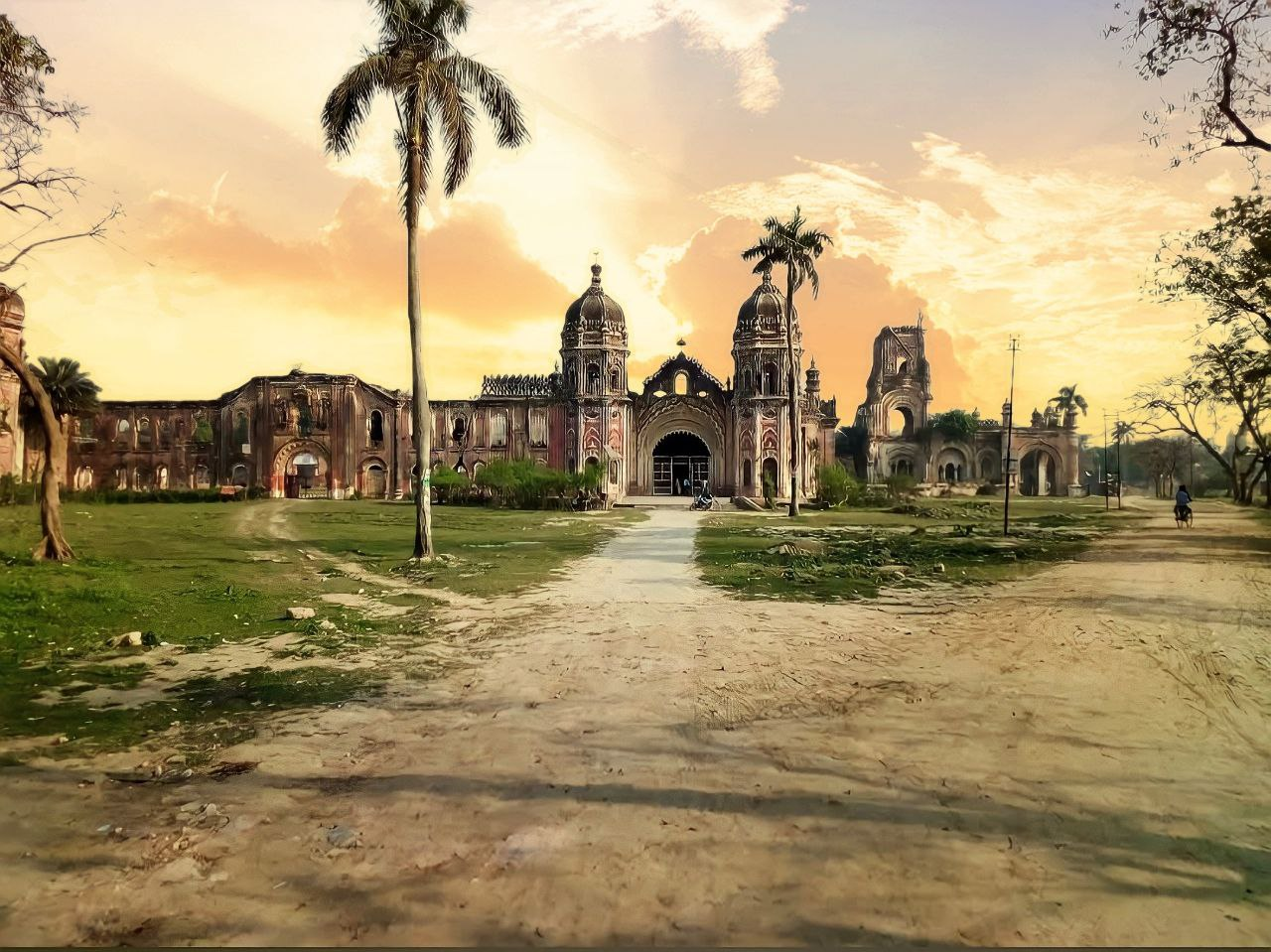
Durga temple in raj palace Rajnagar

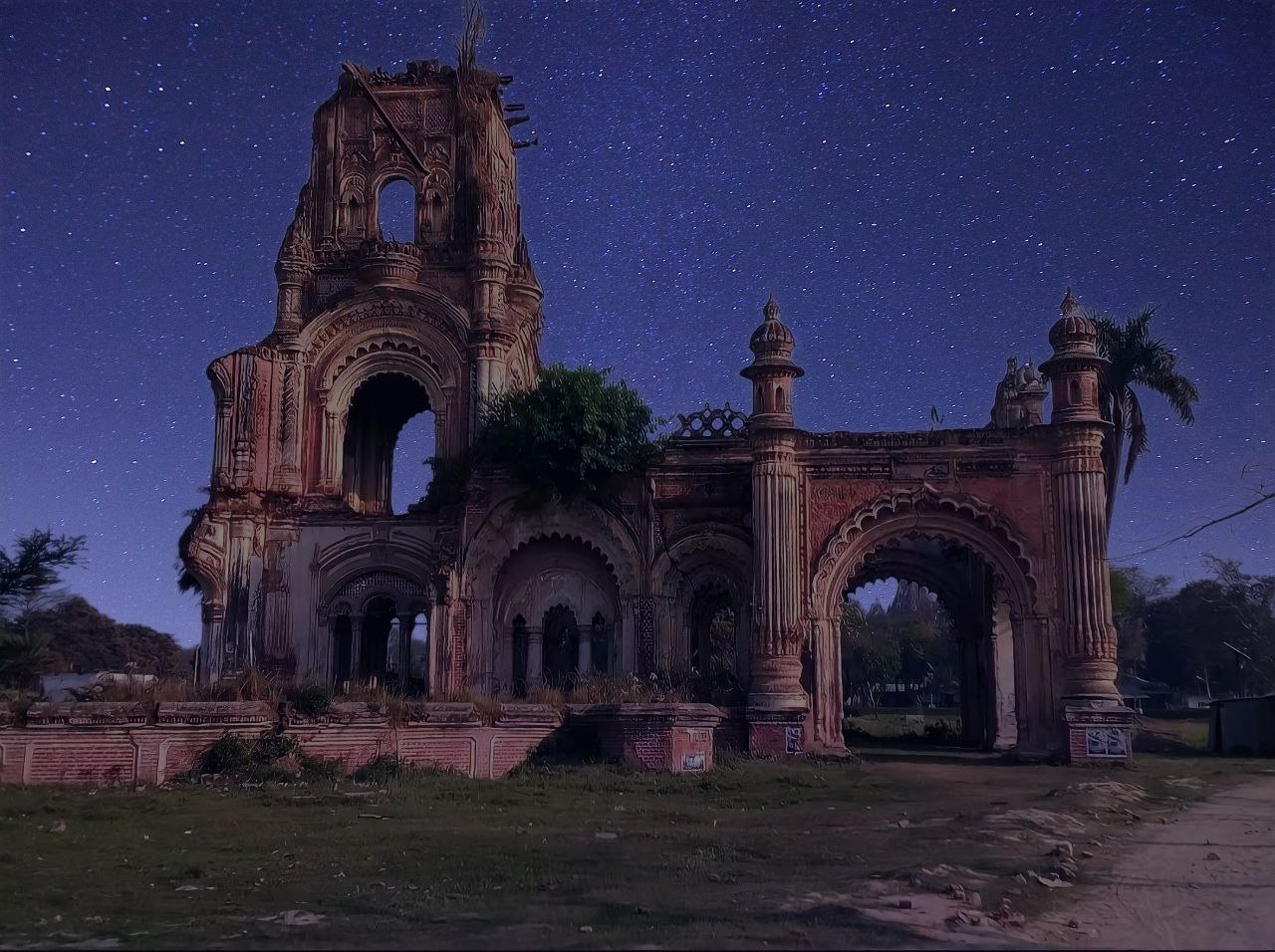
Naulakha palace

Rajnagar is the nearest village to Madhubani, Bihar, India. The ruins of the Rajnagar Palace, destroyed in the 1934 Nepal–Bihar earthquake, are located here.

== History ==
Maharajadhiraj Rameshwar Singh wanted to shift the headquarters of Raj Darbhanga from Darbhanga to Rajnagar and spent money in building palaces and temples and excavating or renovating tanks. The palaces were ruined almost beyond repair and the temples were also very badly damaged. The earthquake rendered the main palace through the Durga hall and the roof over the inner shrines into a mass of ruins and the marble image of the deity broke into pieces.

The Shiva temple built on the South Indian model was beyond repair.

The village has had electricity since 1959. A railway station of the North-Eastern Railway serves the village. The village is also the centre of trade in Euryale ferox (water berries).

== Gallery ==
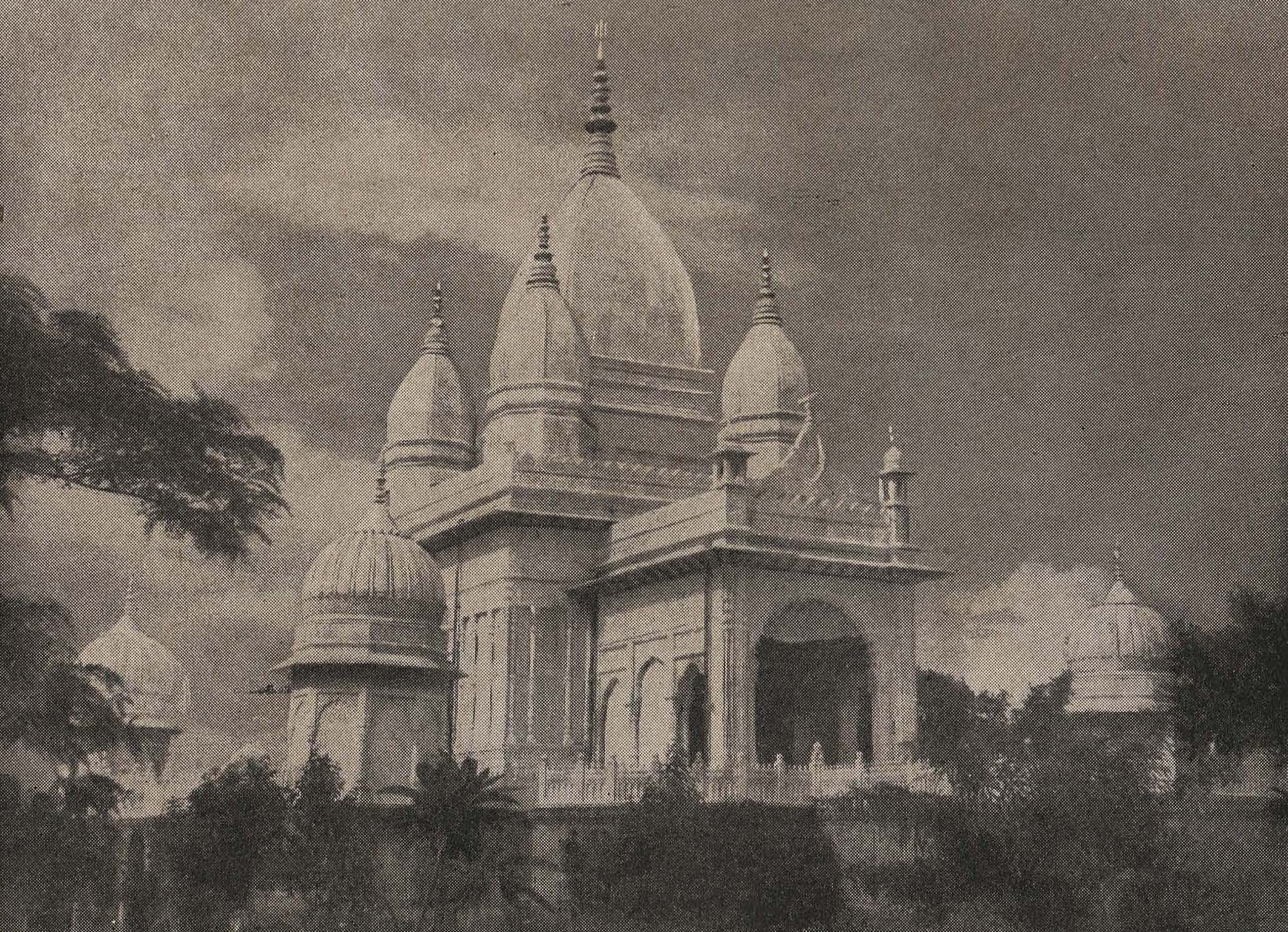
Kali Temple at Raj Nagar

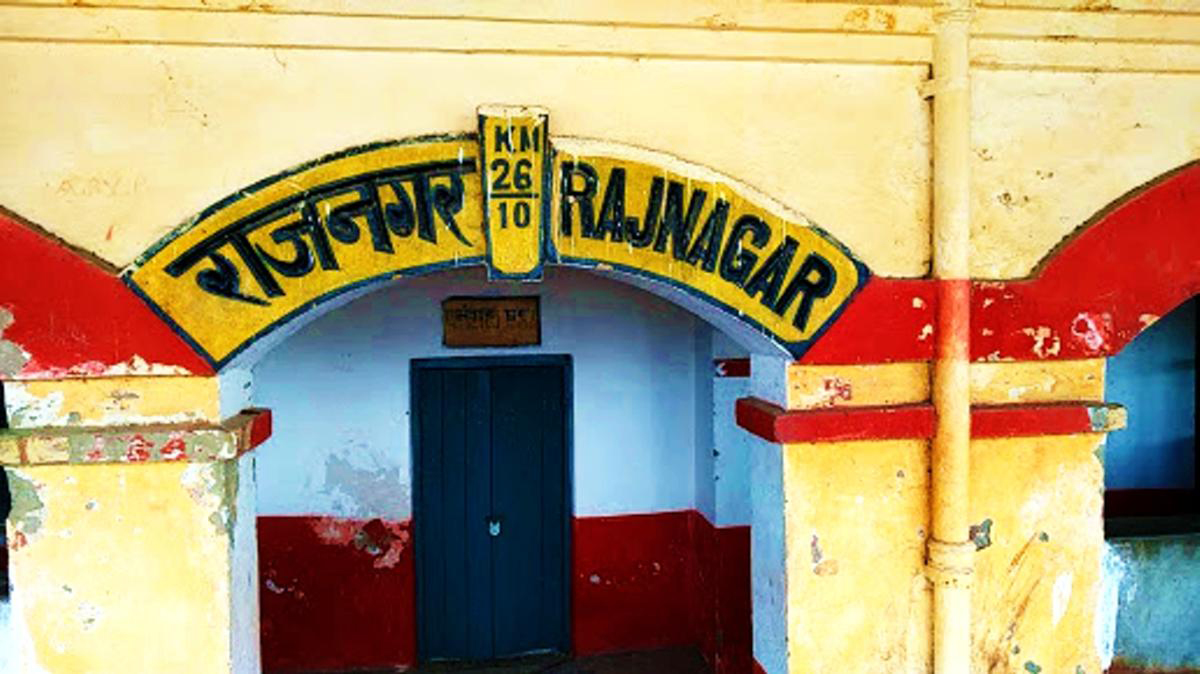
Rajnagar Railway Station is located in Madhubani district

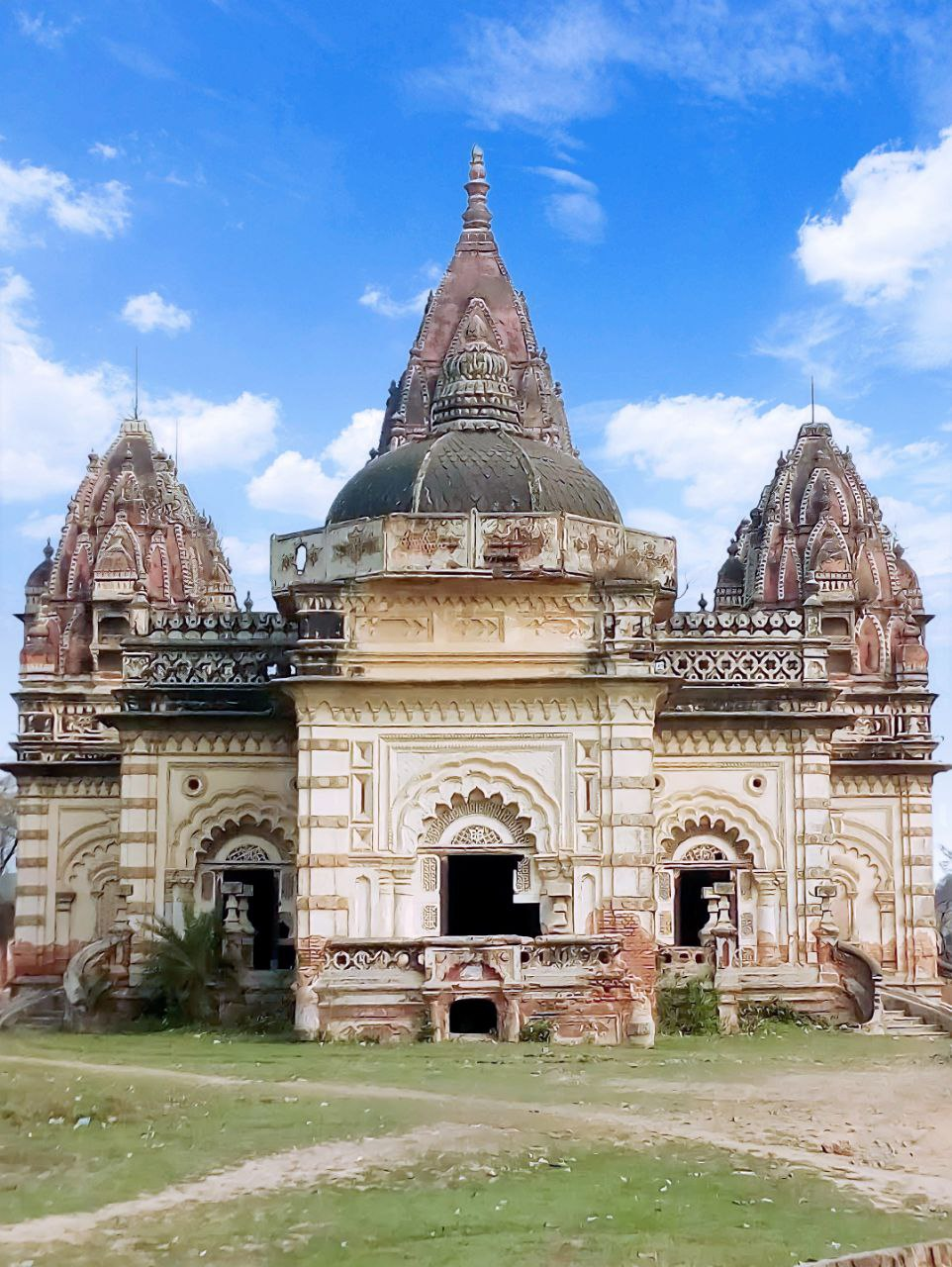
Girja temple
