= Lalkavi =

Maithil poet

- लालकवि
- Born: Lal Jha; Mangrauni, Madhubani district
- Other names: Lal Jha, Lal Kavi, Kabi Lal
- Occupations: Poet, dramatist
- Notable work: Gauriswayamvaranataka

Notes
- Court-poet at the court of Maharaja Narendra Singh in Mithila

Lalkavi or Lal Kavi or Lal Jha or Kabi Lal was an 18th-century Maithil poet in the Mithila region of the Indian subcontinent. He was a contemporary of Maharaja Narendra Singh. He was the court-poet at the court of Maharaja Narendra Singh. He also wrote plays in the tradition of Maithili literature. His best-known work is Gauriswayamvaranataka. He lived in the village of Mangrauni.

== Description ==
The Maithil poet Lalkavi also described the war of Kandarpi Ghat in his writings and poems. His poem on the battle is Kandarpi Ghat Larai. Narendra Singh granted him the village of Kanail for it.

== Early life ==
The early life of the poet Lalkavi is not clearly known. His father, mother and caste is unclear in the available historical texts. According to historical documents, he was the resident of Mangrauni village. The village lies near the present city Madhubani in the state of Bihar in India. In the historical book The Modern Vernacular Literature of Hindustan written by the indologist George Abraham Grierson, the original name of the poet Lalkavi is mentioned as Lal Jha or Kabi Lal.
