= Anand Bagh Palace =

Palace in Darbhanga, India

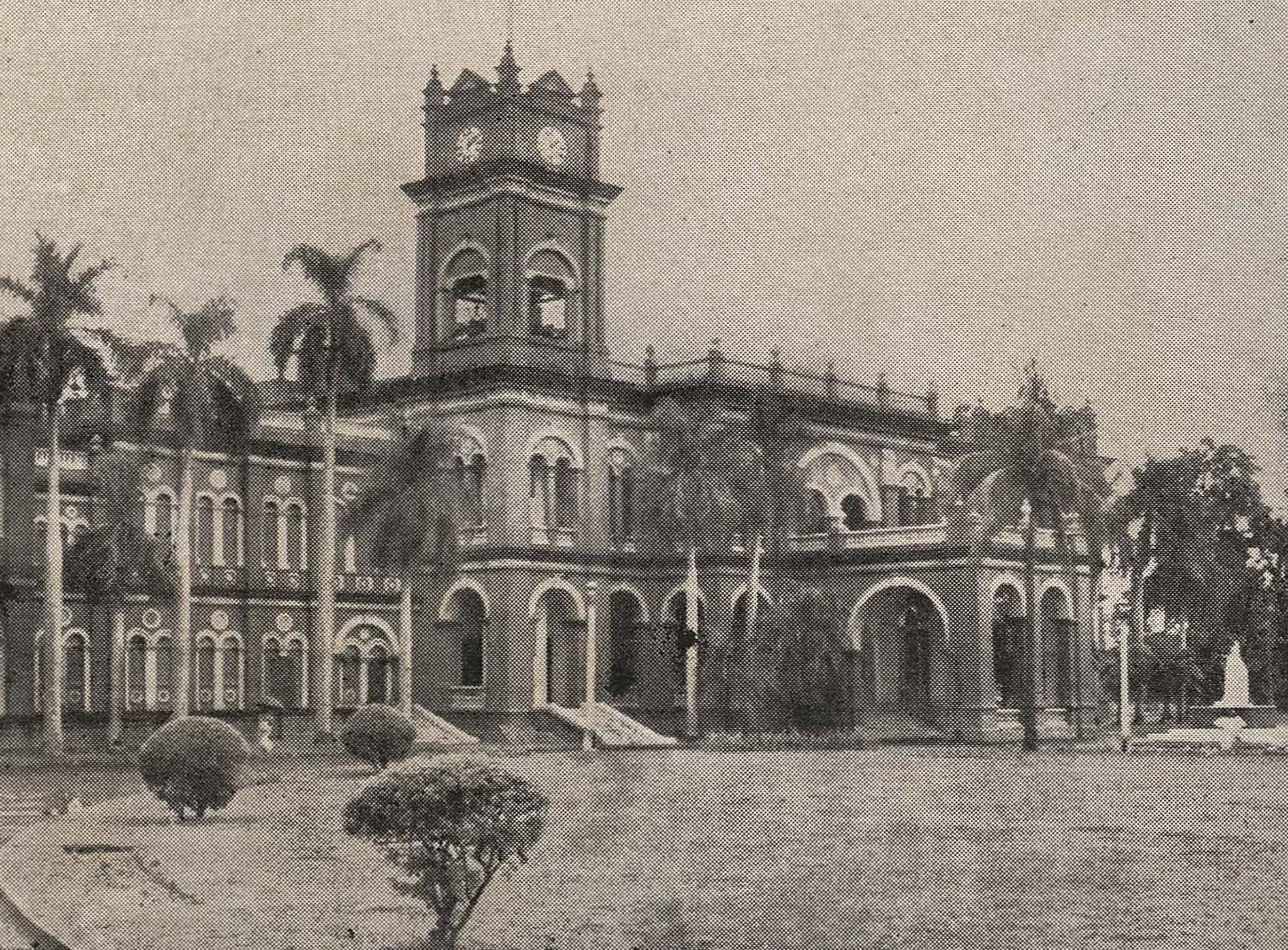

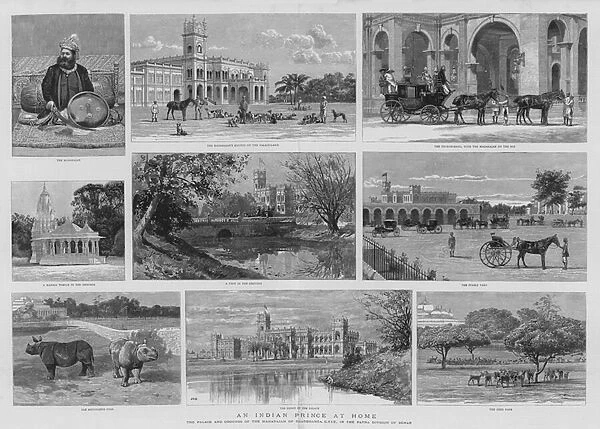
Anand Bagh Palace complex; Illustration from The Graphic Magazine, Dec. 1888 issue

Anand Bagh Palace (also known as Lakshmivilas Palace) is a palace situated in town of Darbhanga in the Indian state of Bihar. Anand Bagh Palace was constructed during the reign of Maharaja Lakshmeshwar Singh in the 1880s and was severely damaged during the 1934 Nepal–Bihar earthquake. It was rebuilt thereafter.

Anand Bagh Palace was donated to the Government of Bihar by Maharaja Kameshwar Singh for starting a university for promotion of Sanskrit language. Currently, this palace is the head office of Kameshwar Singh Darbhanga Sanskrit University.

Anand Bagh Palace was well known for its beautiful gardens surrounding it that have now disappeared. Roper Lethbridge mentions about the Lakshmivilas Palace: "The new Palace at Darbhanga, with its immense stables, its botanical and zoological gardens, and its many beautiful surroundings, is well known in England by the sketches that have appeared in the London illustrated papers." The garden surrounding the palace had several rare species of plants such as Branched palm having over 8 branches, Rudraksha, Sandalwood, Mahogany, and others. Many species of orchids were also planted around the palace.

The garden was laid out on the extensive grounds of the palace by Charles Maries, who was recommended by Sir Joseph Hooker to Maharaja Lakshmeshwar Singh for the post of Superintendent of the gardens of the Raj Darbhanga.
