= Kameshwar Singh Darbhanga Sanskrit University =

Public Sanskrit university in Darbhanga, Bihar, India

- Type: Public
- Established: 1961 (65 years ago)
- Affiliations: UGC
- Chancellor: Governor of Bihar
- Vice-Chancellor: Laxmi Niwas Pandey
- Location: Darbhanga, Bihar, India
- Campus: Urban
- Website: https://ksdsu.bihar.gov.in

Kameshwar Singh Darbhanga Sanskrit University (KSDSU) is a state university located at Darbhanga, Bihar, India, dedicated to the teaching and promotion of Sanskrit.

== History ==
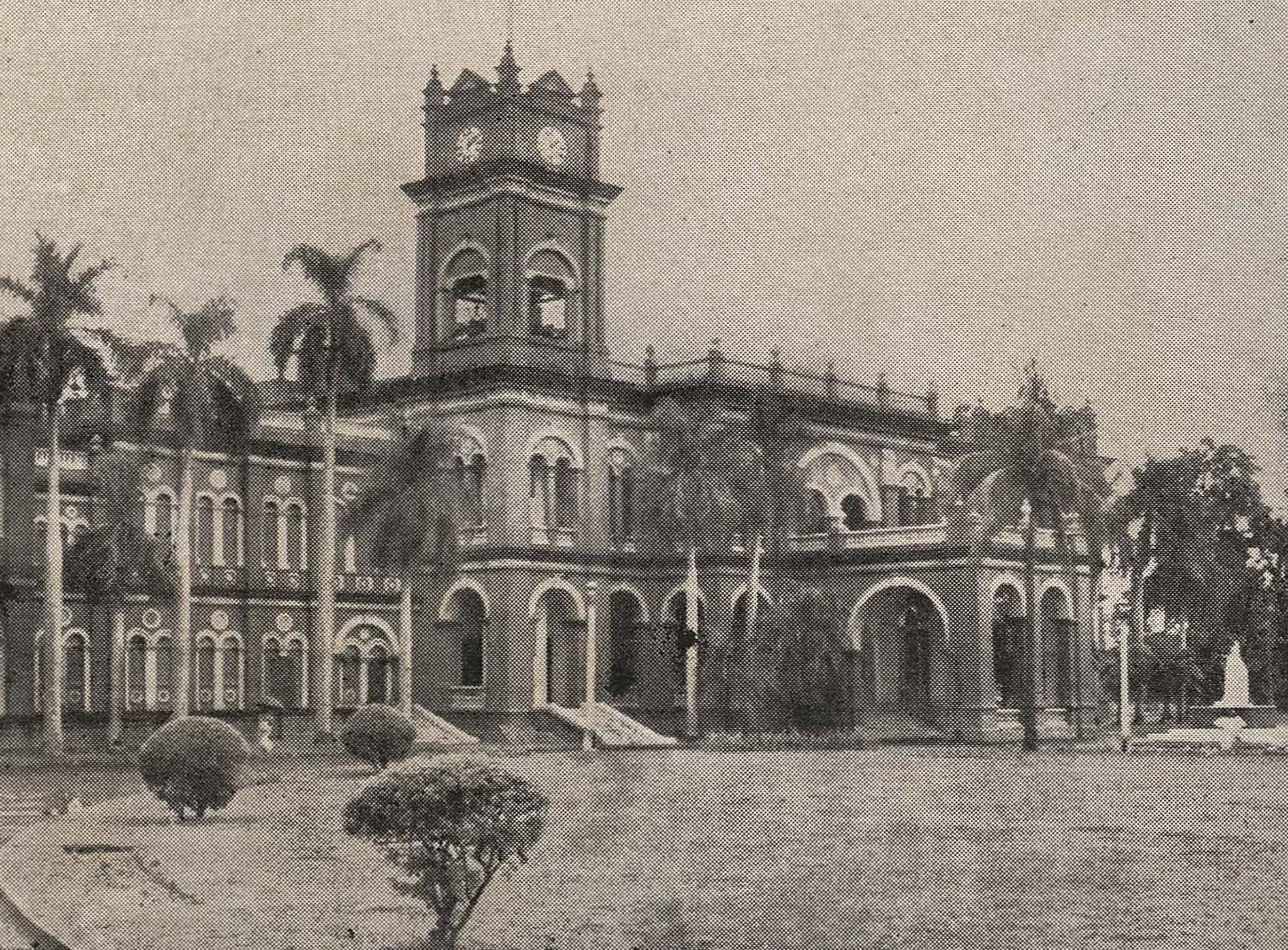
Sanskrit University Building at Darbhanga donated by the Maharajadhiraj.

KSDSU was established in 1961, with the scholar Umesh Mishra as its first Vice-Chancellor. The then Education Minister of unified Bihar, Satyendra Narayan Sinha, announced the instigation of the university. Kameshwar Singh donated his ancestral Anand Bagh Palace to the government of Bihar as a university for the promotion of Sanskrit. Currently, this palace is the head office of the university.

It has held one awareness campaign. Sanskrit scholar and poet Ram Karan Sharma was the vice chancellor from 1974 to 1980.

== Campus ==
Kameshwar Singh Darbhanga Sanskrit University is located in Laxmishwar Vilas Palace, also known as Anand Bag in Darbhanga.

== See also ==
- List of Sanskrit universities in India
- Sanskrit revival
- Mithila Vishwavidyalaya Panchang
- Grahan Mala
