= Bharat Dharma Mahamandala =

Orthodox Hindu organization

- Formation: 1887
- Founder: Din Dayalu Sharma
- Founded at: Haridwar, India
- Type: Hindu religious organization
- Location: Haridwar, British India
- Region served: Indian subcontinent
- Services: Book publishing, Religious education, social reform, temple maintenance
- Key people: Pandit Din Dayalu Sharma; Pandit Madan Mohan Malaviya; Nabagopal Mitra; Rajnarayan Basu

Bharat Dharma Mahamandala was a Hindu organization founded in colonial India in 1887 by Pandit Din Dayalu Sharma in Haridwar. It had purpose to unify and support orthodox Hindu communities in colonial India during a period marked by religious and social reform. The Mahamandala emerged during a period of social and religious reform movements in India. It positioned itself as a defender of orthodox Hinduism against critiques and alternative interpretations from groups like the Arya Samaj, Theosophists, and Ramakrishna Mission.

== History ==
The Bharat Dharma Mahamandala was established with the goal of consolidating the leadership within orthodox Hindu circles and preserving Sanātana Dharma (considered as the eternal law in Hinduism). Pandit Din Dayalu Sharma, also known for founding the Hindu College in Delhi in 1899, envisioned the Mahamandala as a central body for various Hindu organizations.

The first meeting of the organization was attended by various notable participants, including figures like Henry Steel Olcott of the Theosophical Society, Raja Harbans Lal of Sheikhupura, Diwan Ramjas of Kapurthala, Bal Mukand Gupta, and Pandit Ambika Dutt Vyas. Over time, the Mahamandala evolved into an all-India society and organized assemblies in locations including Haridwar, Mathura, and Lahore, extending its presence across the Indian subcontinent.

Initially, the Mahamandala garnered support from members of the ruling Hindu aristocracy, landowners, religious leaders, and Theosophists. Although its activities were concentrated in North India at first, it gradually expanded its influence to South India, becoming one of the leading orthodox Hindu organizations in India.

In the early 20th century, Pandit Madan Mohan Malaviya, an educationist and nationalist, became closely associated with the Mahamandala. The Bharat Dharma Mahamandala led to the formation of the Sanatan Dharma Sabhas, an offshoot established to defend Hinduism against criticisms from both within and outside the community.

According to a report from The Friday Times, a Pakistani publication, Nabagopal Mitra and Rajnarayan Basu were also co-founders of the Bharat Dharma Mahamandala. The organization advocated for the establishment of a Hindu Raj (Hindu nation) or Aryan State and later influenced the formation of the Hindu Mahasabha, a nationalist political party founded in 1915 that included leaders from the radical faction of the Indian National Congress.

In the late 19th century, various groups known as Sanatana Dharma Rakshini Sabhas and similar organizations emerged throughout India. These groups later unified under the Bharat Dharma Mahamandala.

== Work ==
The Bharat Dharma Mahamandala functioned through various departments. It engaged in propagation by training paid missionaries to preach orthodox Hindu principles. It had established Sanatan Dharma schools to promote traditional Hindu education and published literature supporting orthodox beliefs. Their activities included the repair and maintenance of temples and pilgrimage sites. The organization worked for social reforms, including dowry abolition. It promoted modern education, and established educational institutions, homes for widows, and almshouses for indigent women.

== Notable people ==
- Pandit Madan Mohan Malaviya
- Nabagopal Mitra
- Maharajadhiraja Sir Rameshwar Singh
- Maharajadhiraj Sir Kameshwar Singh
- Amarendranath Chatterjee
- Mokshadacharan Samadhyayi

== See also ==
- List of Hindu organisations
