= Pragati Yatra =

Political cum development tour of Nitish Kumar in the state of Bihar

Pragati Yatra (Devanagari: प्रगति यात्रा) was a political tour by the chief minister Nitish Kumar of Bihar to inaugurate and launch development projects in the state of Bihar in India. The Pragati Yatra was conducted in four phases. In this political tour of Pragati Yatra, he covered all 21 districts of North Bihar region. The journey of the first phase of the Pragati Yatra started on 23 December 2024 from the West Champaran district of Bihar. The third phase of the Yatra was concluded on 30 January 2025 in the Madhepura district. The Pragati Yatra is also seen as a new trajectory for the growth in the state of Bihar. During this Yatra, the chief minister Nitish Kumar made several announcements for all over development of the state. The fourth phase which was the final phase of the Pragati Yatra was concluded on 21 February 2025 in the city of Patna. The journey of Pragati Yatra covered all 38 districts in the state of Bihar. During the Yatra, he approved 430 schemes worth ₹50,000 crore across the state of Bihar in India.

== Background ==
The statewide political tour of the Pragati Yatra was inspired by the success of the previous Samadhan Yatra from which his political party JDU was able to win 12 Lok Sabha seats in Bihar after the General election 2024 in India. The Pragati Yatra was initially named Mahila Samvad Yatra, but later it was decided that it would be renamed as Pragati Yatra before the start of the statewide political tour.

== First phase ==
The Pragati Yatra was the fifteenth yatra of the chief minister Nitish Kumar since he has taken the in - charge of Bihar as the chief minister from the year 2005. The first phase of the Yatra was started from the Tharu Tola of the Santpur Panchayat in the Bagaha-2 block of the West Champaran district. On the inauguration of the first phase of the Pragati Yatra, he laid the foundation stone and inaugurated various schemes at Ghotwa of the Tharu Tola. There he observed various products made by Tharu community and discussed with the Jeevika didi. In the journey of this phase, five districts were selected. These five districts were East and West Champaran, Sheohar, Sitamarhi, Muzaffarpur and Vaishali.

== Second phase ==
The second phase of the Pragati Yatra was started on 4 January 2025 from Gopalganj district. On this day, the chief minister Nitish Kumar inaugurated and laid the foundation stone of schemes worth a total of Rs 1 billion 39 crore 02 lakh 75 thousand in the Gopalganj district. His major program was at the Pakri Pokhara Tola village of Karsghat Panchayat in the Sidhavaliya block on this day. There he observed the open gym, tree plantation and Jal Jeevan Hariyali program and inaugurated various schemes in the village. He also inspected the Anganwadi center and observed the pond, community building, workshop, etc. there.
