= 1934 Nepal–India earthquake =

1934 earthquake in South Asia

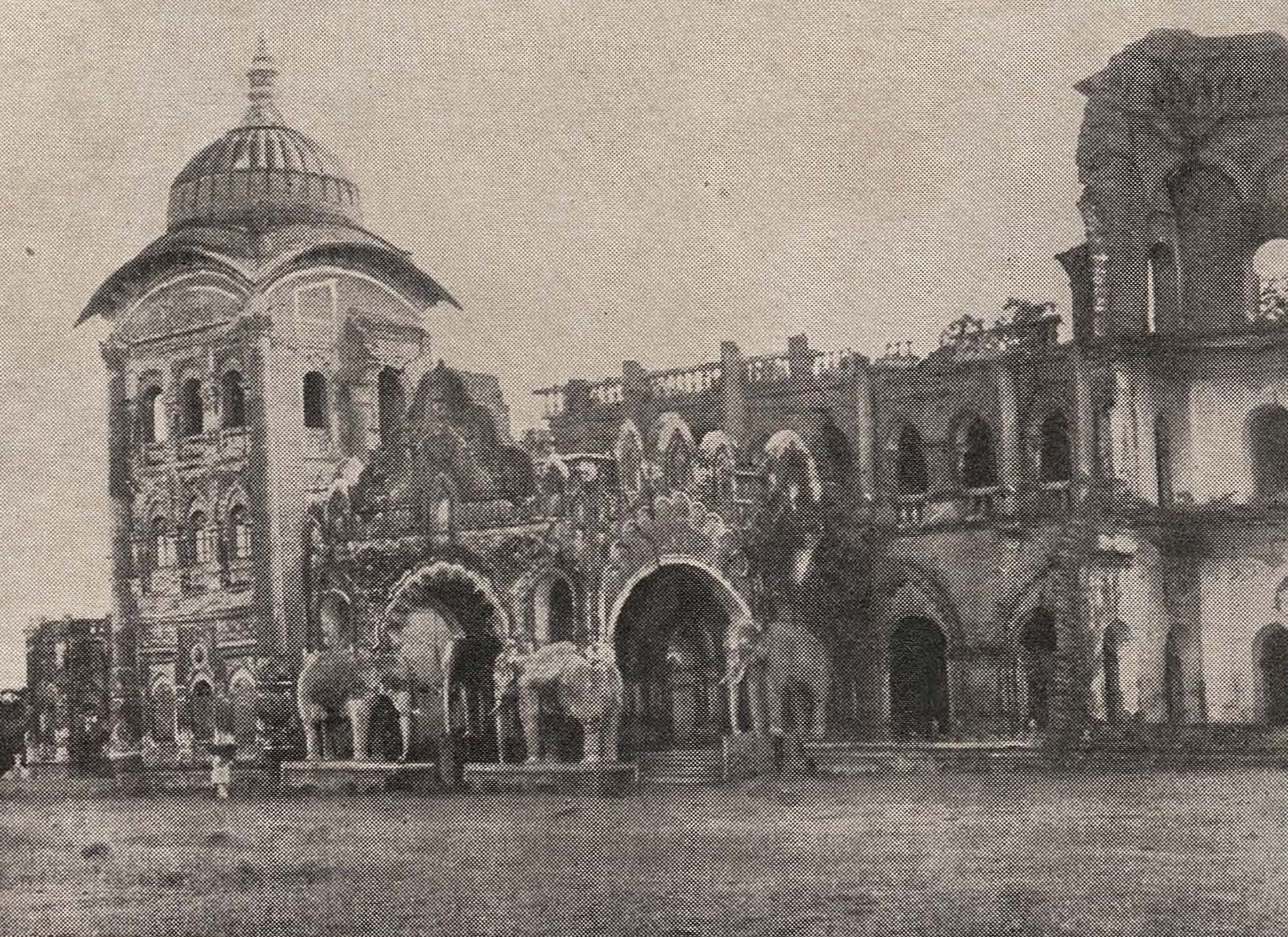
- Old Darbhanga Raj Palace which was damaged by the earthquake

- Location within Nepal
- UTC time: 1934-01-15 08:43:25
- ISC event: 904745
- USGS-ANSS: ComCat
- Local date: 15 January 1934
- Local time: 2:13 pm IST
- Magnitude: 8.0 M_{w}
- Depth: 15 km (9.3 mi)
- Epicenter: 26.86°N 86.59°E
- Fault: Main Frontal-Himalayan Thrust
- Type: Oblique
- Areas affected: India, Nepal
- Max. intensity: MMI X (Extreme)
- Casualties: 10,700–12,000 dead

The 1934 Nepal–India earthquake or 1934 Bihar–Nepal earthquake was one of the worst earthquakes in India's history. The towns of Munger and Muzaffarpur were completely destroyed. This 8.0 magnitude earthquake occurred on 15 January 1934 at around 2:13 pm IST (08:43 UTC) and caused widespread damage in northern Bihar and in Nepal.

== Earthquake ==
The epicentre for this event was located in eastern Nepal about 9.5 km (5.9 mi) south of Mount Everest. The areas where the most damage to life and property occurred extended from Purnea in the east to Champaran in the west (a distance of nearly 320 km or 200 mi), and from Kathmandu in the north to Munger in the south (a distance of nearly 465 km or 289 mi). The impact was reported to be felt in Lhasa to Bombay, and from Assam to Punjab. The earthquake was so severe that in Kolkata, around 650 km (404 mi) from epicenter, many buildings were damaged and the tower of St. Paul's Cathedral collapsed.

=== Ground effects ===
A particular phenomenon of the earthquake was that sand and water vents appeared throughout the central vents of the earthquake area. The ground around these sand fissures subsided, causing more damage. Extensive liquefaction of the ground took place over a length of 300 km (called the slump belt) during the earthquake, in which many structures went afloat.

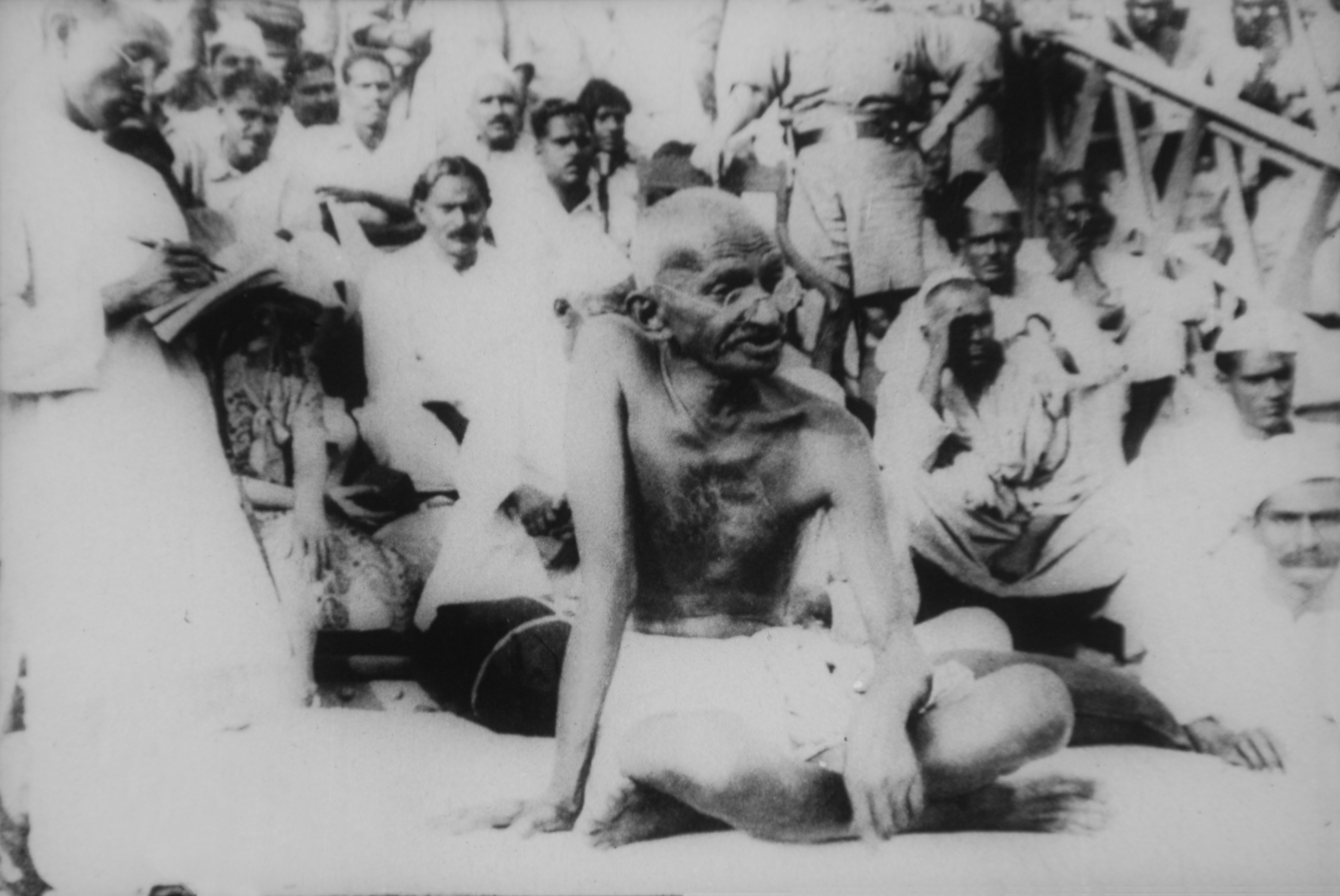
Gandhi visits after the earthquake

In Muzaffarpur, sand fissures erupted at several places in town. The wells were choked with sand, while water levels in tanks became shallower due to sand deposited in the tank beds. Most of the buildings in Muzaffarpur were damaged. All the kutcha (ramshackle) buildings collapsed, while other pukka (solidly built) buildings suffered damage due to sinking and cracking of the ground.

=== Damage ===
The three major towns of the Kathmandu Valley in Nepal—Kathmandu, Bhaktapur and Patan—were severely affected and almost all the buildings collapsed. Large cracks appeared in the ground and several roads were damaged in Kathmandu; however, the temple of Pashupatinath, the guardian deity of Nepal, escaped any damage. The 1618-meter-long Kosi Rail Bridge on the Metre Gauge Railway line connecting Darbhanga Raj with Forbesganj was washed away and the River Kosi changed its path eastward.

In Sitamarhi, not a single house was left standing. In Bhagalpur district many buildings collapsed. In Patna, many buildings in the bazaar were destroyed and damage was particularly severe along the river. In Rajnagar, near Madhubani, all the Kutcha buildings collapsed. The buildings of Darbhanga Raj, including the famous Navlakha Palace, were severely damaged. In the Phulhar village of district, the earlier older temple of the Girija Sthan was damaged and collapsed due to the earthquake. In Jharia the earthquake led to further spread of underground fire. The town of Birgunj was destroyed, along with its telephone line to Kathmandu.

The number of deaths was 10,700–12,000 with 7,253 recorded in Bihar.

A 1935 work by Major General Brahma Shamsher documenting the event, Nepalko Maha Bhukampa 1990, stated that this was Nepal's most destructive earthquake in living memory, and praised the Nepalese Army for its work in relief efforts.

== Aftermath ==
Mahatma Gandhi visited the Bihar state. He wrote that the Bihar earthquake was providential retribution for India's failure to eradicate untouchability. Rabindranath Tagore took offence to the irrationality in his statement and accused Gandhi of superstition, even though he was totally in agreement with Gandhi on the issue of untouchability. In Bihar, Sri Babu (Shri Krishna Sinha) and the other leaders such as Anugrah Babu (Anugrah Narayan Sinha), threw themselves into relief work. Maghfoor Ahmad Ajazi, an eminent freedom fighter, worked extensively in the earthquake relief operations. He operated several relief camps providing the affected people with food and shelter.

== See also ==
- 1833 Bihar–Nepal earthquake
- 1988 Nepal earthquake
- April 2015 Nepal earthquake
- May 2015 Nepal earthquake
- List of earthquakes in 1934
- List of earthquakes in India
