= Lakshmeshwar Singh =

Indian Maharaja, 1860–1898

- Maharaja of Darbhanga
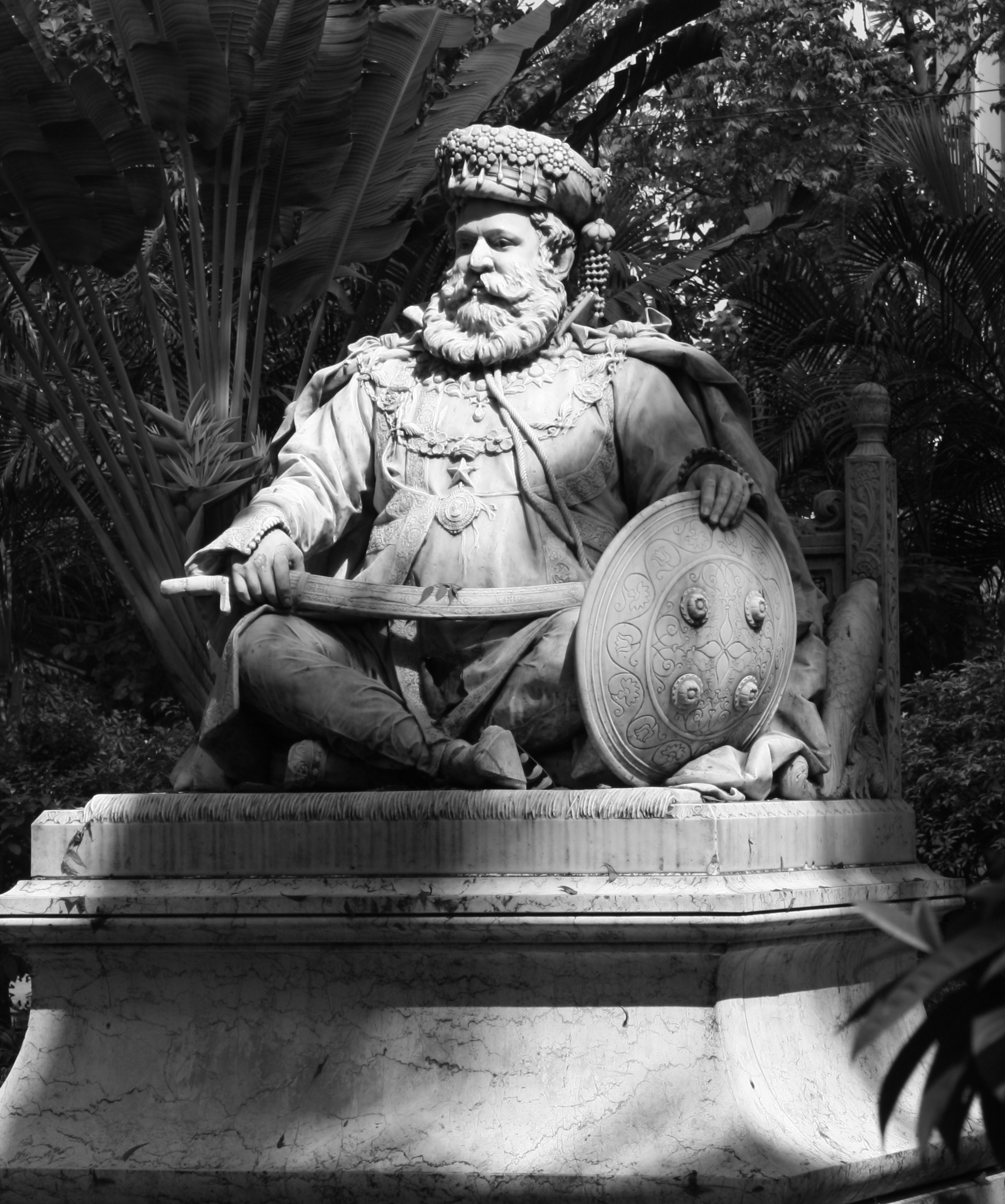
- Reign: 1860–1898
- Predecessor: Maharaja Maheshwar Singh
- Successor: Maharaja Rameshwar Singh
- Born: Darbhanga
- Died: 1898
- House: Raj Darbhanga
- Father: Maheshwar Singh Bahadur
- Religion: Hinduism

Maharaja Sir Lakshmeshwar Singh, Maharaja of Darbhanga GCIE (25 September 1858 – 16 November 1898) was the zamindar and principal landowner of Darbhanga in the Mithila region, presently in the state of Bihar, India. His philanthropic works, administrative abilities and management of his estate (Raj Darbhanga) were highly appreciated and led to development of his estate.

== Biography ==
Lakshmeshwar Singh was the eldest son of Maharaja Maheshwar Singh of Darbhanga, who died when Lakshmeshwar was aged two. The British Raj placed the estate of Darbhanga under the control of the Court of Wards because the heirs to the estate were minors. One of his tutors was a Scottish-Englishman, Chester Macnaghten until his majority, then became the founding principle of the Rajkumar College, Rajkot.

For the next 19 years, until he attained majority, he was caught in political one-upmanship between his mother, who was supported by family priests, and the Tutors appointed by the British Government, who wanted him to be free from Zenana influence. He along with his younger brother Rameshwar Singh (who became Maharaja of Darbhanga after Lakshmeshwar Singh's death) received a western education from Government appointed tutors as well as a traditional Indian education from a Sanskrit Pandit, one of his uncles, a Maulvi and a Bengali gentleman. During the period when Lakshmeshwar Singh was under the guardianship of the Court of Wards, he received a monthly allowance of Rs. 5 a month even though the annual income of his estate was equivalent to a six-digit figure in pounds sterling.

On attaining his majority, Lakshmeshwar Singh devoted himself entirely to public duties of his position. He was appointed and served as a Member of the Legislative Council of the Viceroy. He was also one of nine members of the Royal Commission on Opium of 1895, formed by the British Government. Haridas Viharidas Desai, the Diwan of Junagadh, was the only other Indian member.

In 1875, Tirhut Railway was one such privately-owned train service which was introduced by Maharaja Lakshmeshwar Singh of Darbhanga way back in 1874 to serve the drought-hit general public in North Bihar. It is also known as the first private train of the country. Railway Line opened in Darbhanga between Mokama and Darbhanga by Local King Lakshmeshwar Singh of Raj Darbhanga through Tirhut Railway. Lakshmeshwar Singh championed freedom of speech, personal and political rights. In 1898, he and W. C. Banerjee, were the only prominent Indians to publicly criticise and fight against the proposed widening of scope of section 124-A and 153-A of the Indian Penal Code that was meant to suppress freedom of press in reporting news that could be deemed seditious in nature or against Government policy and insertion of section 108 in Indian Penal Code that gave right to postal authorities to seize any material that was suspected of containing matter obnoxious to section 124-A and 153-A of Indian Penal Code.

Lakshmeshwar Singh died on 17 December 1898. He did not have any children and thus his younger brother, Rameshwar Singh, succeeded him as Maharaja.

== Public charity ==
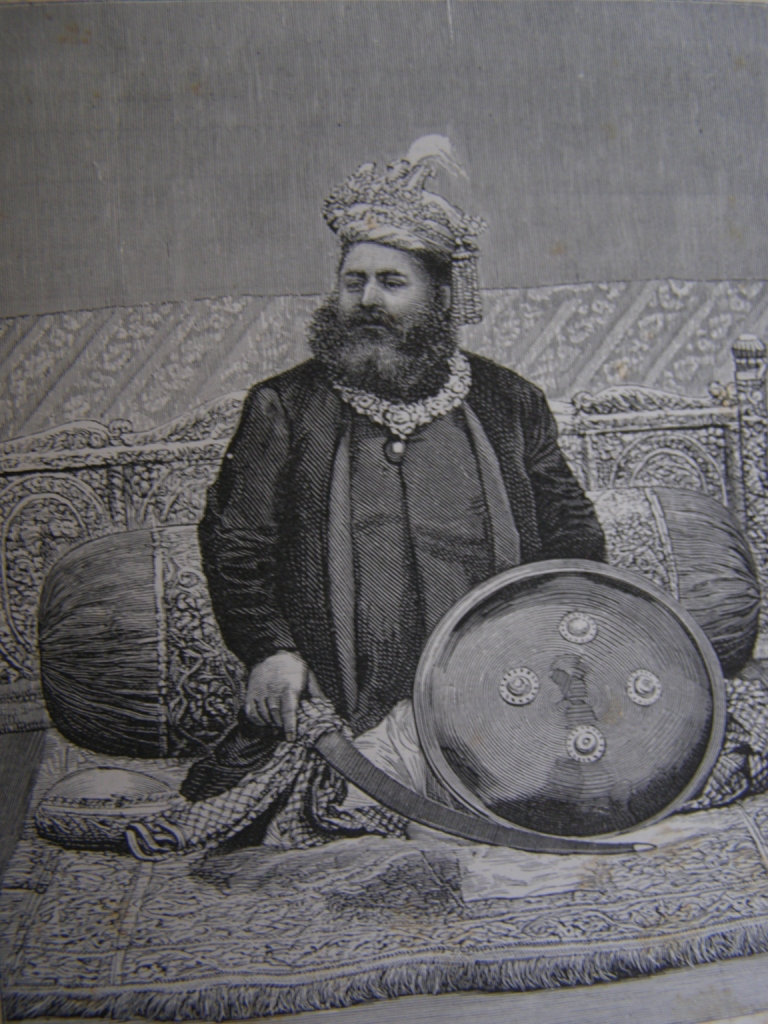
Lithograph Print of Maharaja Lakshmeshwar Singh published in Graphic Magazine, December 1888.

He built an Anglo-vernacular school at a cost of £1490, which he maintained, as well as nearly thirty vernacular schools of different grades; and subsidised a much larger number of educational institutions.

The Maharaja was also one of the founders of Indian National Congress as well as one of the main financial contributor thereto.

== Other information ==
On the occasion of the Golden Jubilee of Great Queen Victoria, Lakshmeshwar Singh was created a Knight Commander of the Most Eminent Order of the Indian Empire, being promoted to Knight Grand Commander in 1887.

The British Governor commissioned Edward Onslow Ford to make a statue of Lakshmeshwar Singh. This is installed at Dalhousie Square in Kolkata.
