= Rameshwar Singh =

Maharaja of Darbhanga (1898–1929)

- Hon. Maharajadhiraja Sir

Maharaja of Darbhanga
- Reign: 1898–1929
- Predecessor: Maharaja Lakshmeshwar Singh
- Successor: Maharaja Kameshwar Singh Bahadur
- Born: 16 January 1860; Darbhanga
- Died: 3 July 1929 (aged 69)
- Issue: Maharajadhiraj Kameshwar singh Bahadur, Maharajkumar Vishveshwar Singh
- House: Raj Darbhanga
- Father: Maharaja Maheshwar Singh Bahadur
- Religion: Hinduism

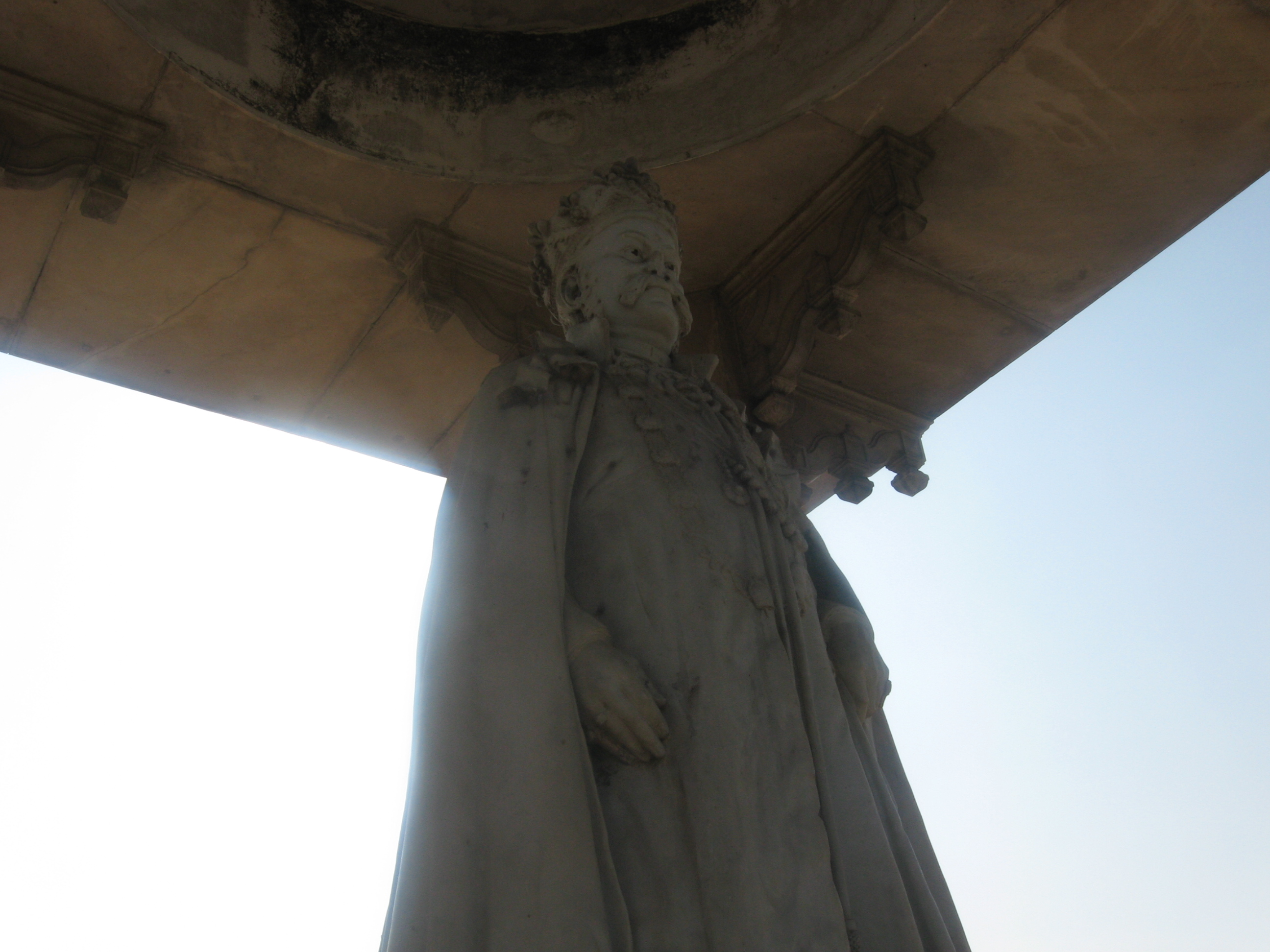
Statue of Rameshwar Singh at Chaurangi Square Darbhanga City

Rameshwar Singh Thakur GCIE KCB KBE (16 January 1860 – 3 July 1929) was the maharaja of Darbhanga in the Mithila region from 1898 to his death. He became maharaja on the death of his elder brother Lakshmeshwar Singh, who died without issue. He was appointed to the Indian Civil Service in 1878, serving as assistant magistrate successively at Darbhanga, Chhapra, and Bhagalpur. He was exempted from attendance at the Civil Courts and was appointed a Member of the Bengal Legislative Council in 1885. He was the first Indian appointed to the lieutenant governor's Executive Council.

He was a member of the Council of India of the governor general of India in 1899 and on 21 September 1904 was appointed a non-officiating member representing the Bengal Provinces, along with Gopal Krishna Gokhale from Bombay Province.

He was president of the Bihar Landholder's Association, president of the All India Landholder's Association, president of Bharat Dharma Mahamandal, a member of the Council of State, a trustee of the Victoria Memorial in Calcutta, president of the Hindu University Society, M.E.C. of Bihar and Orissa and Member of the Indian Police Commission (1902–03). He was awarded the Kaiser-i-Hind medal in 1900. He was the only member of the India Police Commission who dissented with a report on requirements for police service, and suggested that the recruitment to the Indian Police Services should be through a single exam only, to be conducted in India and Britain simultaneously. He also suggested the recruitment should not be based on colour or nationality. This suggestion was rejected by the India Police Commission. Maharaja Rameshwar Singh was a Tantric and was known as Buddhist Siddha. He was considered a Rajarshi (sage king) by his people.

He was made a knight commander of the Order of the Indian Empire (KCIE) on 26 June 1902, was promoted to a knight grand commander in the 1915 Birthday Honours List and was appointed a knight commander of the Order of the British Empire, Civil Division in the 1918 Birthday Honours List.
