= Manokamna Mandir =

- मनोकामना स्थान मंदिर
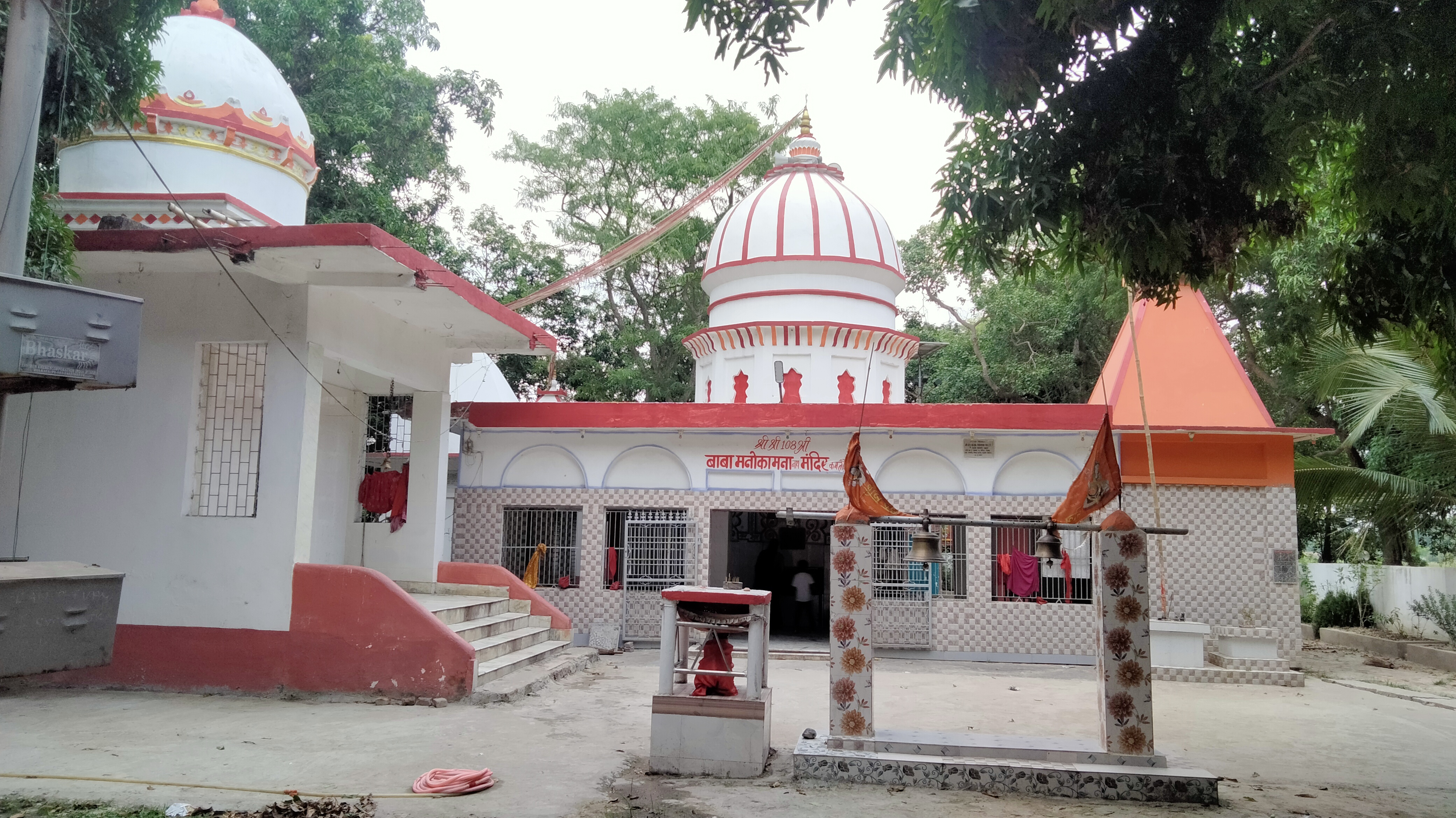
- Campus of Manokamna Sthan at Kamtaul Village

Religion
- Affiliation: Hinduism
- District: Madhubani district
- Deity: Manokamna Nath Mahadev
- Festival: Savan Sombari

Location
- Location: Kamtaul Village, Harlakhi block, Madhubani district, Mithila region, Bihar
- State: Bihar
- Country: India
- Interactive map of Manokamna Mandir

Manokamna Mandir ( Maithili: मनोकामना मंदिर ) is an ancient Hindu temple located at Kamtaul village of Harlakhi block in Madhubani district of Mithila region in Bihar, India. According to legend, it is said that the temple existed from Treta Yuga. It is associated with Ramayana.

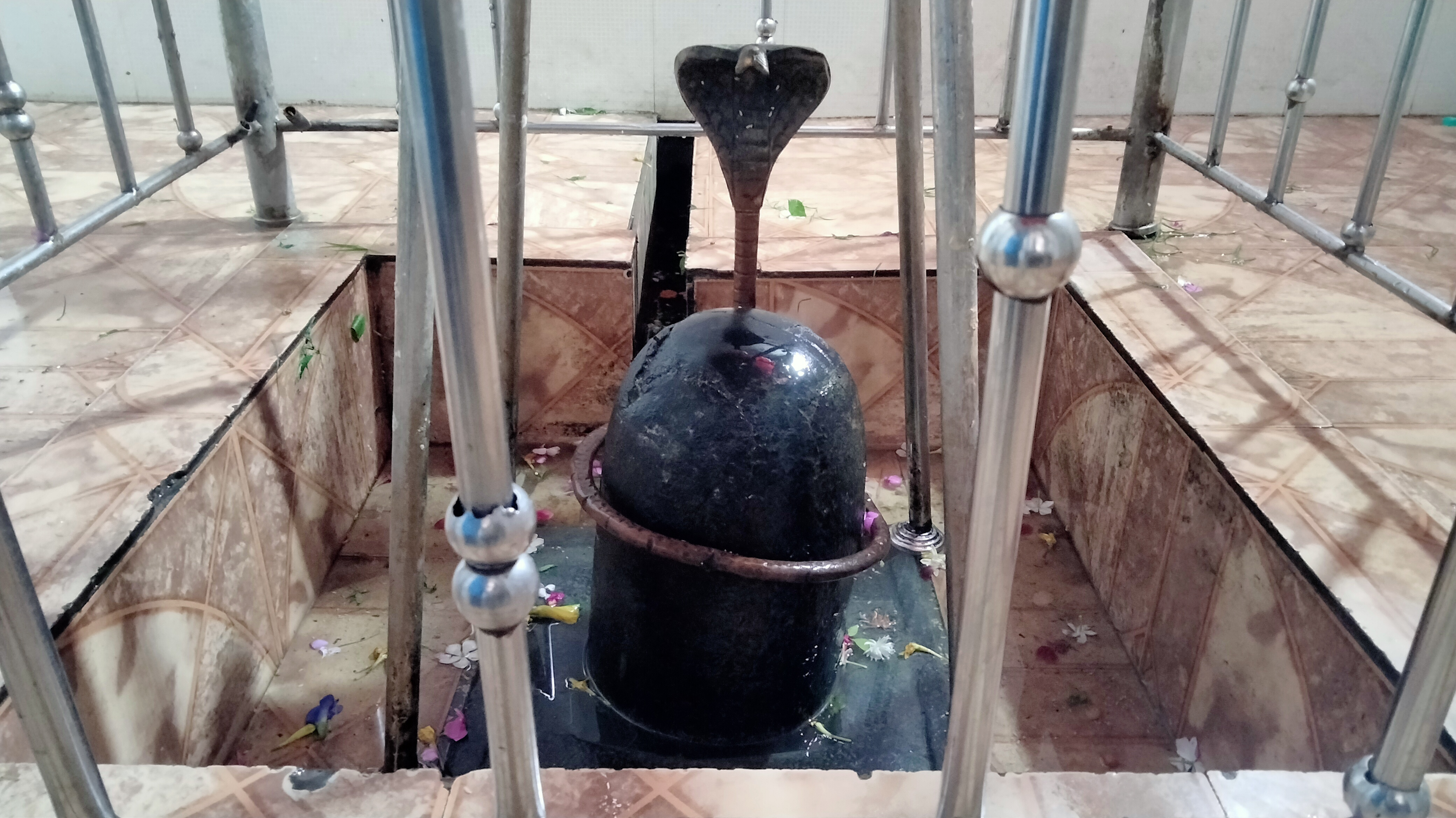
View of Baba Manokamna Nath Mahadev Shivling

== Etymology ==
Manokamna is an Indian word meaning devotional wishes. It is believed that a devotee with good wishes comes here for worship to be fruitful. The literal meaning of Manokamna Mandir is a temple where wishes become fruitful.

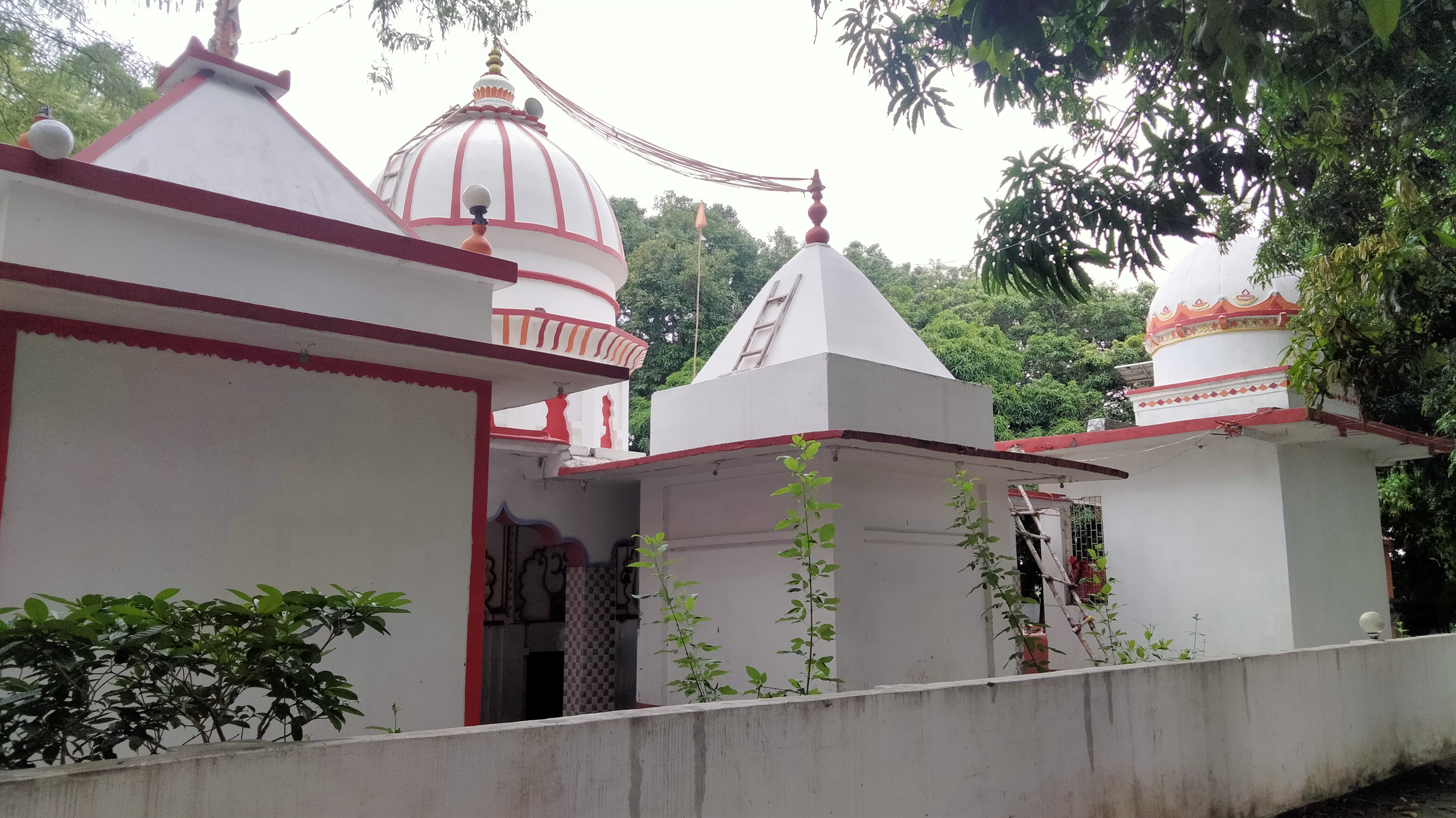
View of the temples of Lord Kartika, Goddess Parvati and Lord Ganesha at the campus of the Manokamna Mandir

== Description ==
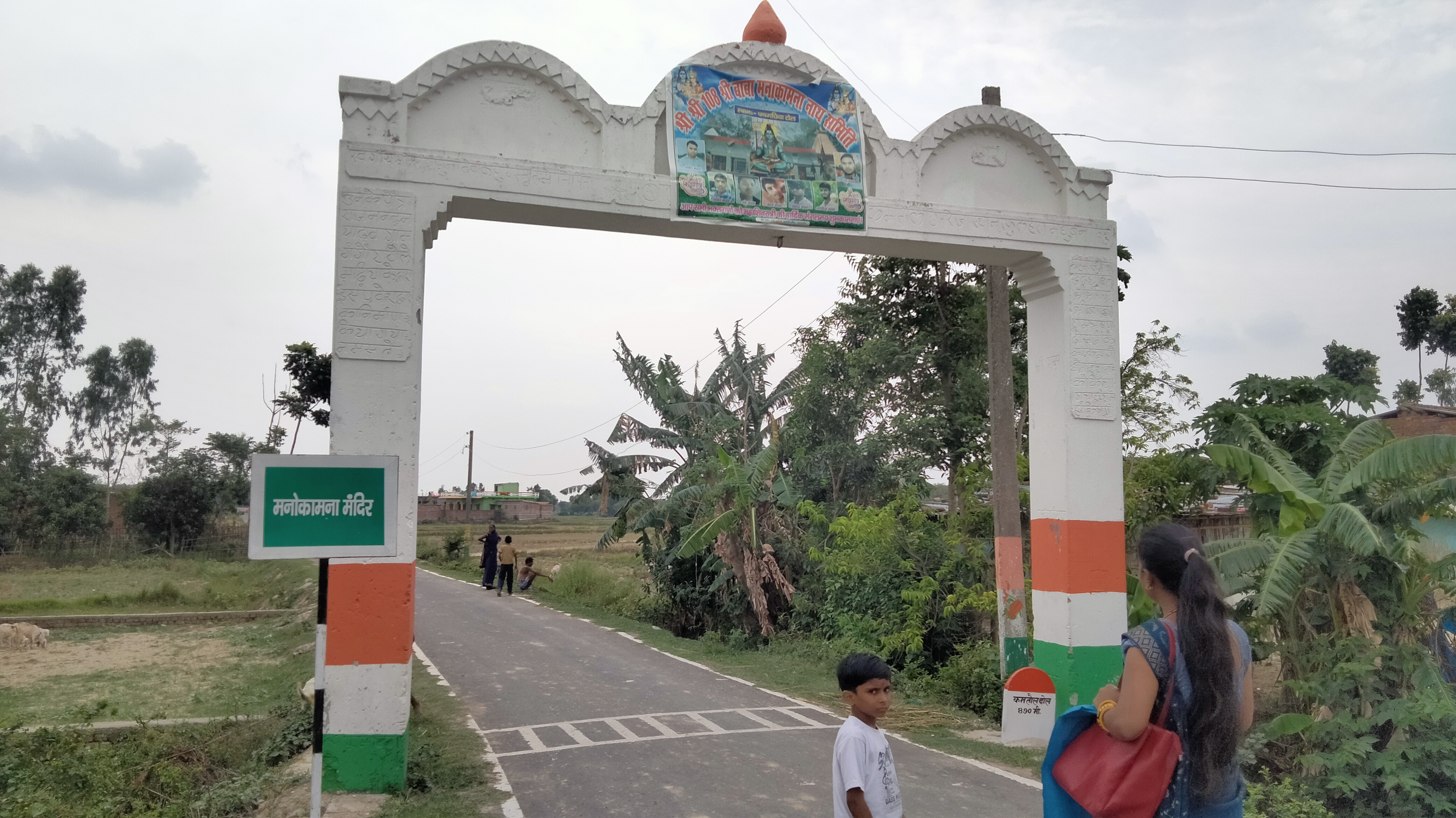
Manokamna Mandir Road Gate at National Highway 227 passing through the outskirts of the village

According to Baba Rambhushan Das Nirmohi, Goddess Sita came worshipping to Phulhar Girija Devi for 12 years continuously. Then goddess Girija Devi blessed Sita and told to her worshipping Manokamna Mandir for the fruitful of her wishes. The place is also known as Manokamna Sthan. There is Lord Shiva temple in the campus of place known as Baba Manokamna Nath Mahadev Mandir. Every year on Sombaris during Sravani Mela, huge devotee of Lord Shiva gathered here for Jalabhisheka on the Shivlinga of the temple. Around vicinity of the temple there are some more places like Baag Taraag Pushpavatika at Phulhar which was the flower garden of King Janaka, Kalyaneshwar Mahadev Mandir, and Vishwamitra Ashram in Bisaul, etc. related to Ramayana. It is only at 13 miles distance by road from the capital city Janakpur of the ancient Mithila Kingdom.

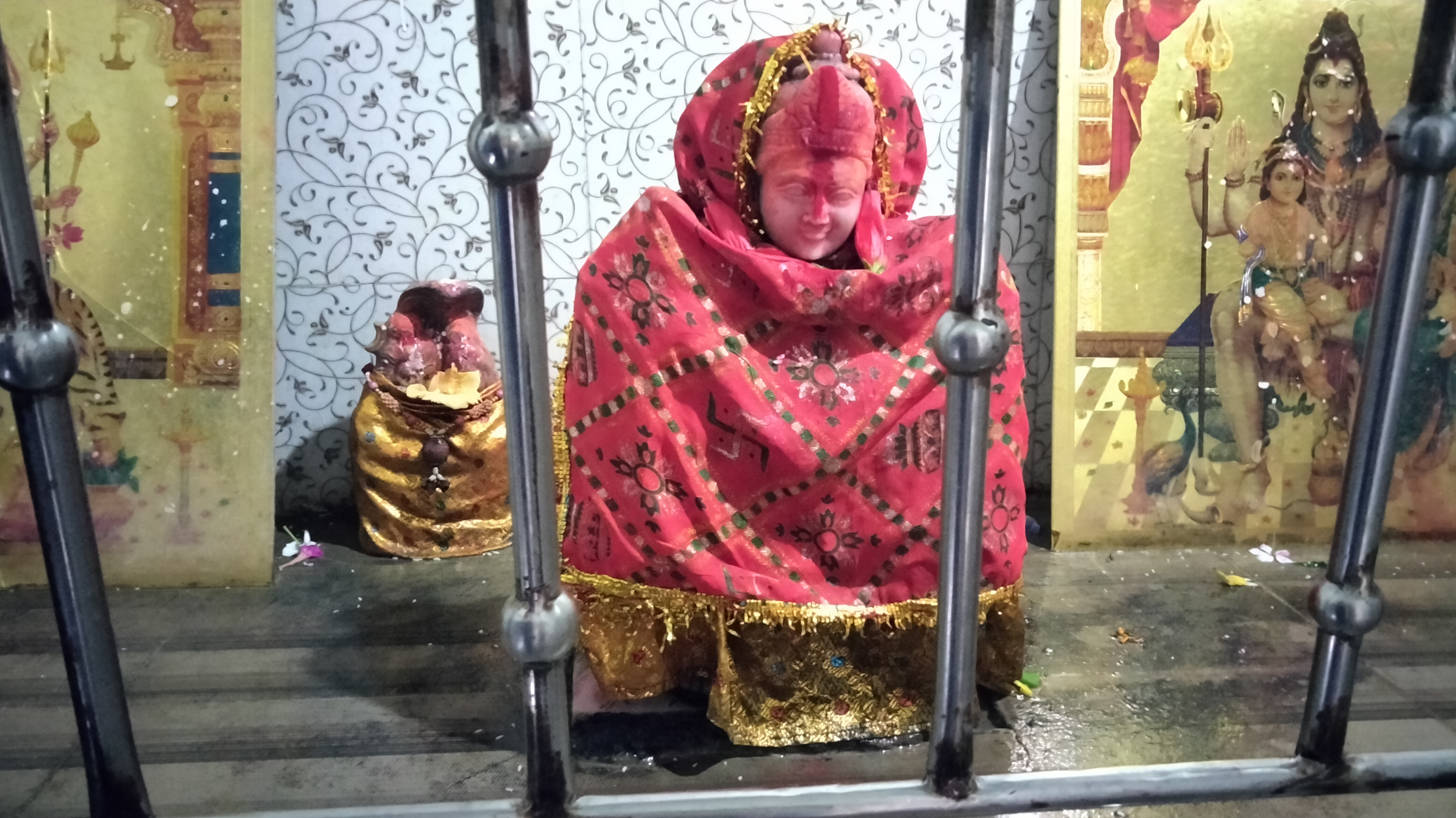
Goddess Parvati's idol at Parvati Mandir in the campus of the Manokamna Mandir

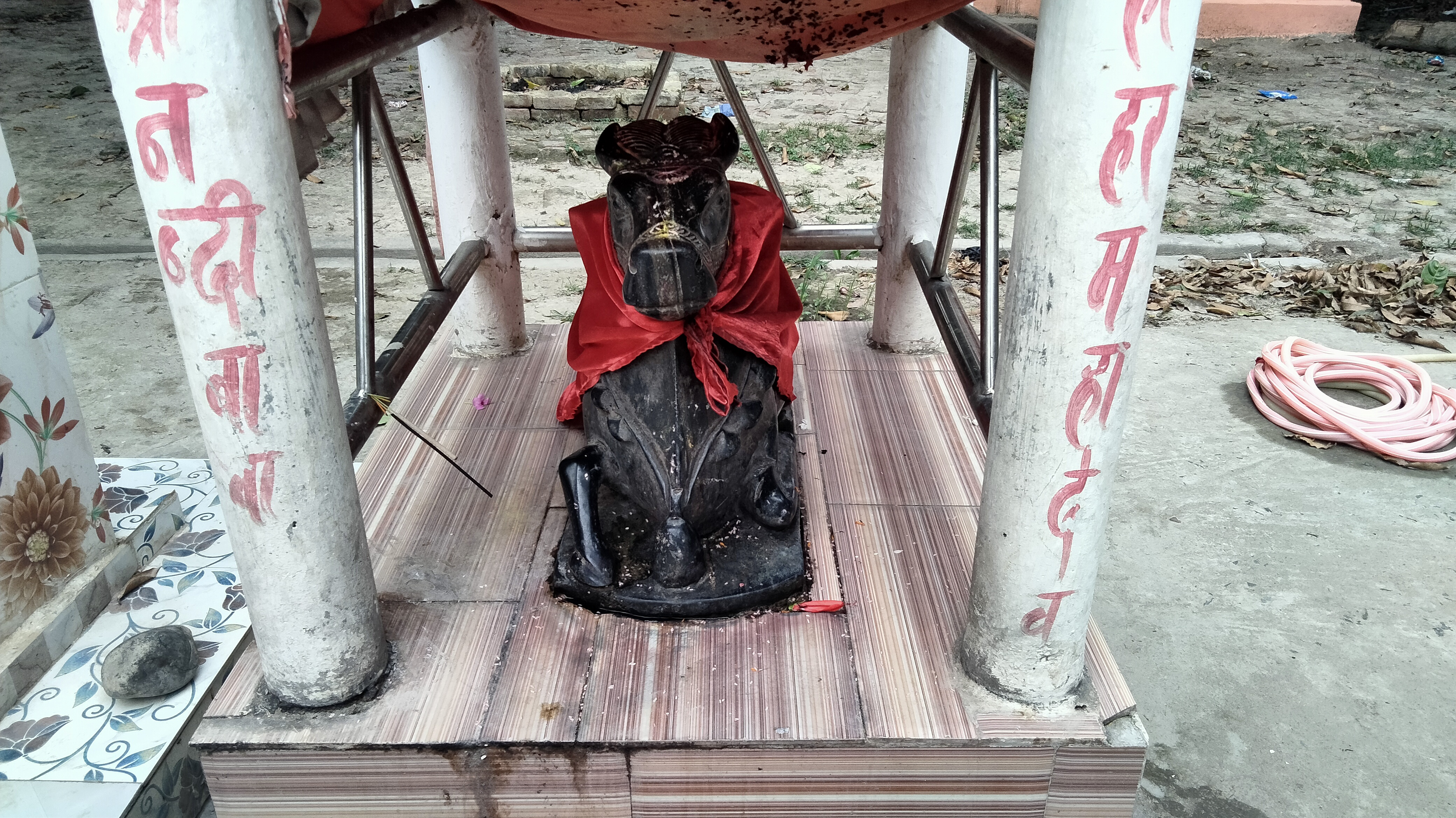
Statue of Lord Nandi Maharaj (divine vahana of Lord Shiva) in the campus
