= Mithila Madhya Parikrama =

Indian pilgrimage

- Official name: Mithila Madhya Parikrama
- Also called: मिथिला मध्य परिक्रमा
- Observed by: Hinduism
- Type: Cultural
- Significance: Parikrama of sedans of Mithila Bihari(Lord Rama) and Janaki Kishoriji(Goddess Sita)
- Celebrations: Spiritual journey of the central part of Mithila
- Begins: Falgun Amavasya
- Ends: Holi
- Date: 8 March 2027 – 22 March 2027
- Duration: 15 days
- Frequency: Annual

Mithila Madhya Parikrama (मिथिला मध्य परिक्रमा) also called as Madhyamiki Parikrama is an annual circular journey of the central part of the Mithila region in Nepal and Bihar (India). It is held every year between the months of Kartik (October–November), Falgun (February–March) and Baishakh (April–May). It is mentioned in the epic Mithila Mahatmya, which was composed in the 18th century. It is also called as the Mahakumbha of Mithila. Similarly it is also considered as the symbol of Nepal-India mutual goodwill. It also symbolizes the "roti-beti ka rishta" by connecting communities in India and Nepal through a shared cultural and religious heritage related to the legendary marriage between Lord Rama and Goddess Sita in the ancient Mithila Kingdom. Devotees from both nations undertake the pilgrimage, which includes sites in both countries, to reinforce shared traditions and goodwill. It echoes the historical familial ties that form the basis of this deeply rooted relationship.

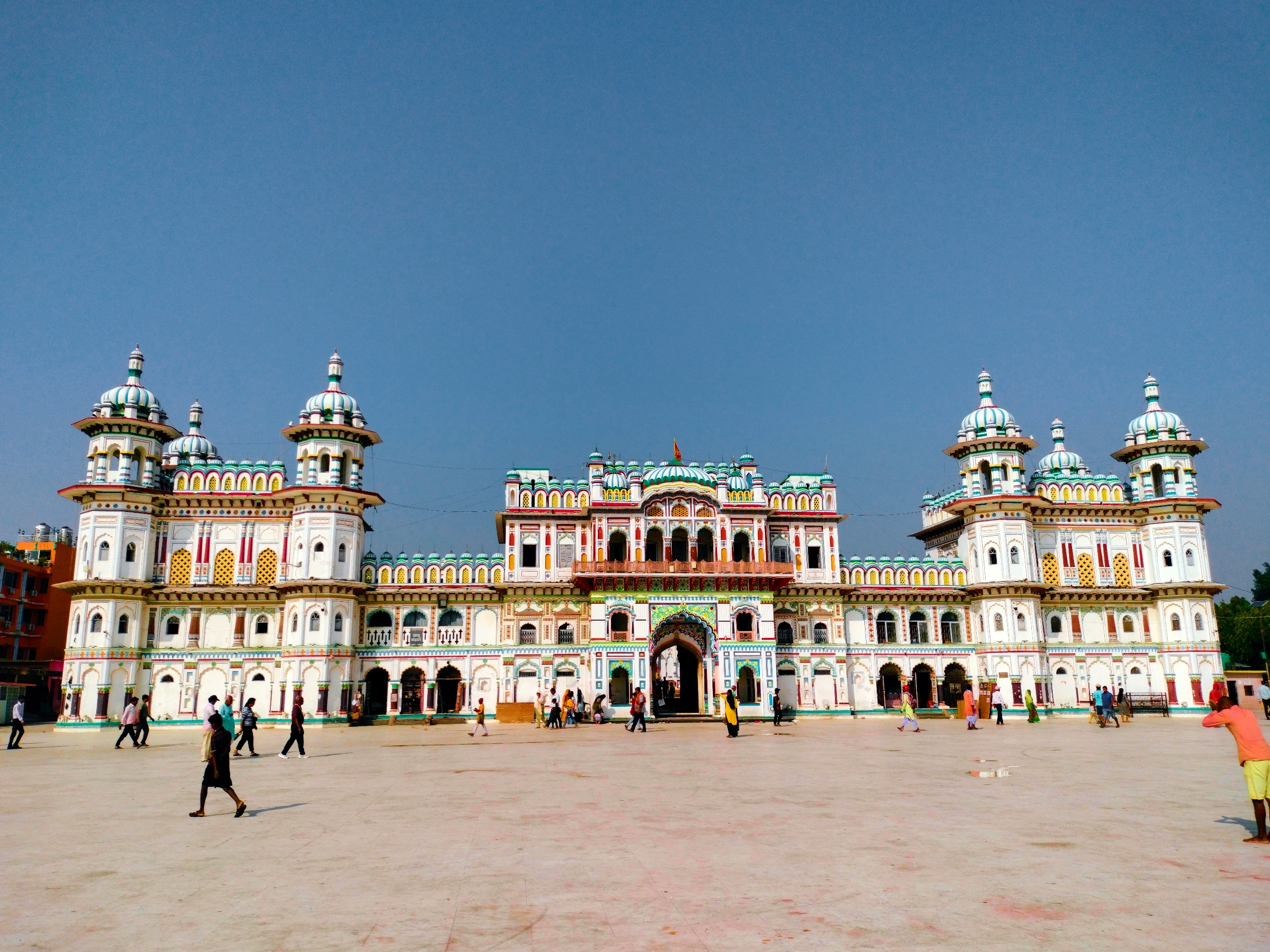
Janaki Mandir in Janakpur where the Mithila Madhya Parikrama concludes

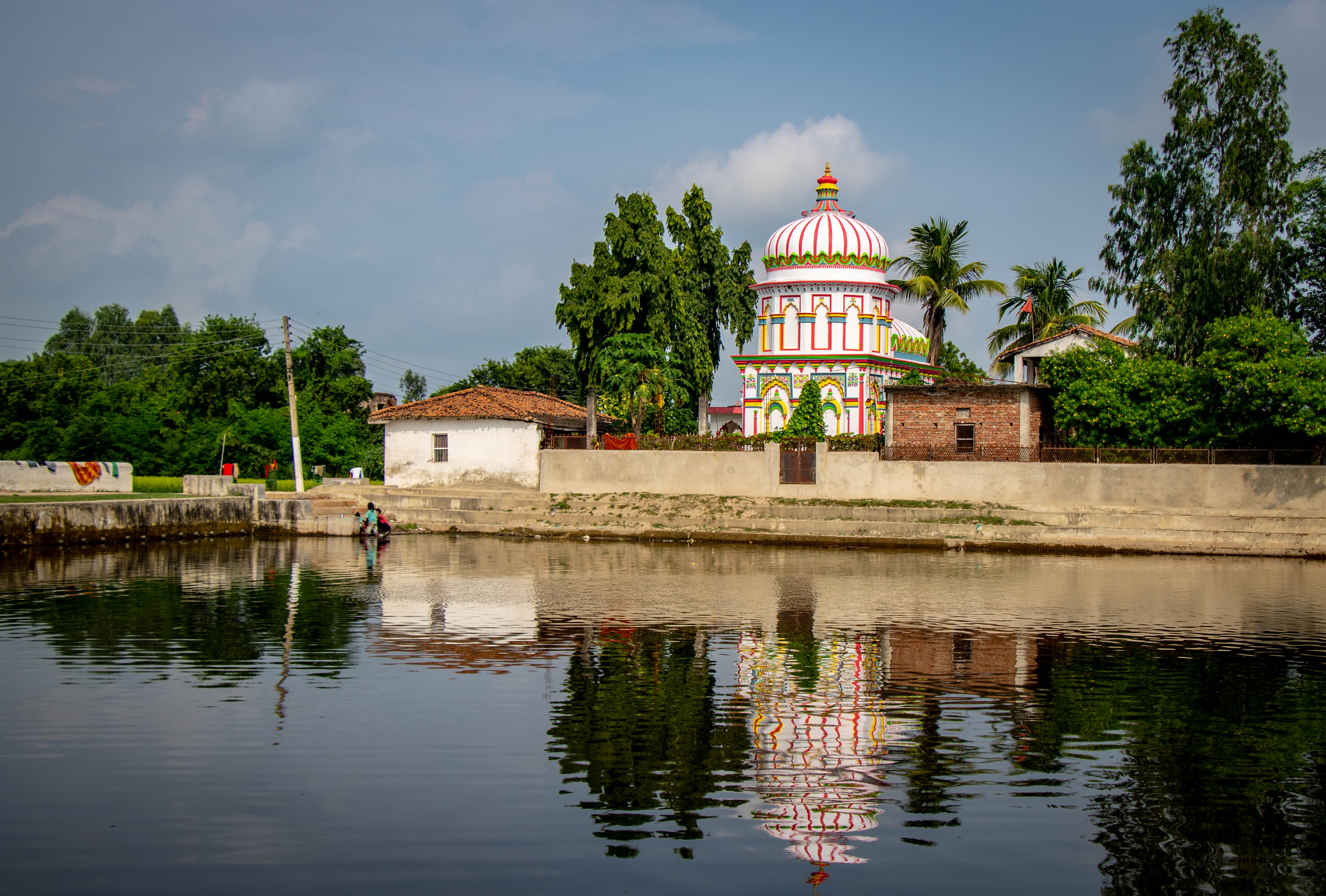
Mithila Bihari Mandir at Kachuri Dham, from where the journey of the Mithila Madhya Parikrama starts

== Description ==
According to the third chapter of the epic Mithila Mahatmya, there are three Hindu calendar months: Kartik (कार्तिक), Falgun (फाल्गुन) and Baishakh (बैशाख) in which this circular journey can be done. It covers a circuit path of 128 kilometres (80 mi) distance between India and Nepal, both countries. Mithila Parikrama is of three types. They are Brihat Mithila Parikrama, Mithila Madhya Parikrama and Antargrih Parikrama. Brihat Mithila Parikrama covers 84 Kosh distance of the ancient Indian distance-measuring system, so it is also called Chaurasi Kosh Parikrama (चौरासी कोश परिक्रमा). It covers area of Mithila near Ganga river, Gandak river, Himalaya and Koshi river. It covers a very large distance. Mithila Madhya Parikrama is smaller than the Brihat Mithila Parikrama. It starts from Kachuri village of Dhanusha district of Mithila region in Nepal and traveling the part of Mithila region in India, it ends at Janaki Mandir in Janakpur, Nepal. According to the text, it should be travelled within only five days but the Pandits of Mithila extended the period of time and determined it for 15 days journey, so that the journey for old and disabled people would be easier. It starts from the day of Amavasya in the Hindu calendar month of Falgun and ends on the day of Purnima or the Hindu festival Holi. On the day of the Hindu festival Holi, an internal circumambulation of the holy city of Janakpur is also performed by the travellers, which is known as Antargrih Parikrama. It covers an approximately 8 kilometres (5.0 mi) long circular path of the city of Janakpur in Nepal. According to sages, it is a world famous circumambulation related to the path of Lord Rama and Goddess Sita in the ancient Mithila Kingdom.

== Related places ==
There are 15 major locations in the pilgrimage circuit of Mithila Madhya Parikrama.

- Kachuri: In the early days, the sedan (Dola) of Lord Rama used to start the journey from Agnikund located in Janakpur, Nepal, for the circumambulation. Agnikund was the place of Yajnsthali of Videha Raj. After the death of the Mahant of Agnikund, the Mahant Ram Naresh Sharan of Kachuridham shifted it to the temple Mithila Bihari Mandir at Kachuridham. Since then, the sedan (Dola) of Lord Rama has started coming out of the Mithila Bihari Mandir at Kachuridham. This place is in Nepal.
- Hanumangadhi: After leaving the dola from Kachuridham, it first reaches King Janaka's court. From there, devotees take a night's rest at Hanumangarhi on the first day with Kishoriji's Dola. It is believed that in Treta Yuga, Bajrang Bali used to guard the gates of Janakpurdham. Hence, this place is known as Hanumangarhi.
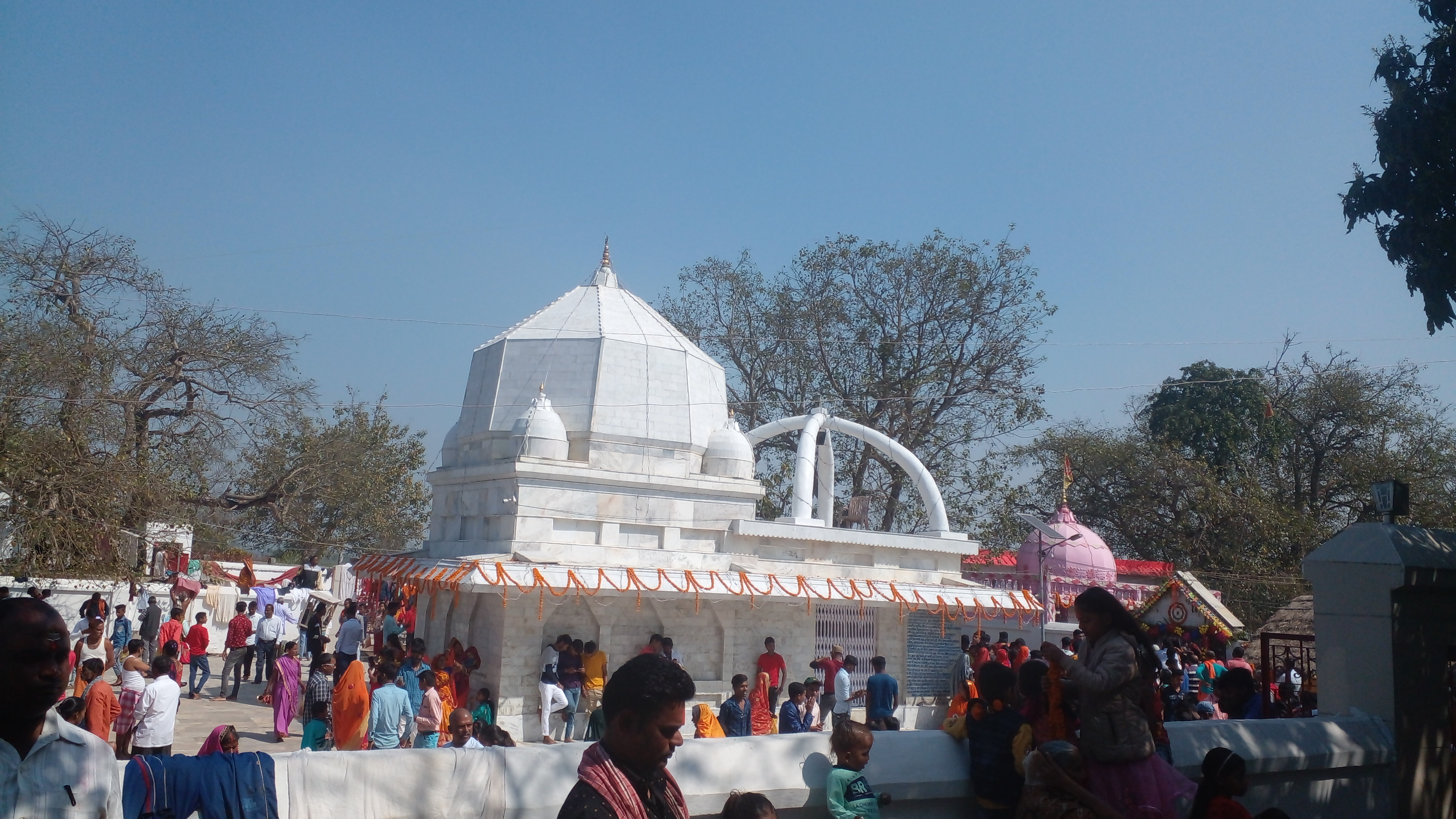
- Kalyaneshwar Sthan, Kalna Village, Madhubani
  Kalyaneshwar Sthan is very famous temple near Indo-Nepal border in Harlakhi block area. King Janaka had established Kalyaneshwar Mahadev temple at the entrance of ancient Mithila Dham. The rest of the second day's journey takes place at this place. The resolution of the journey also takes place at this place. After that the devotees and travellers move from there towards Phulhar via the villages of Sothgaon, Durgapatti and Pipraun.
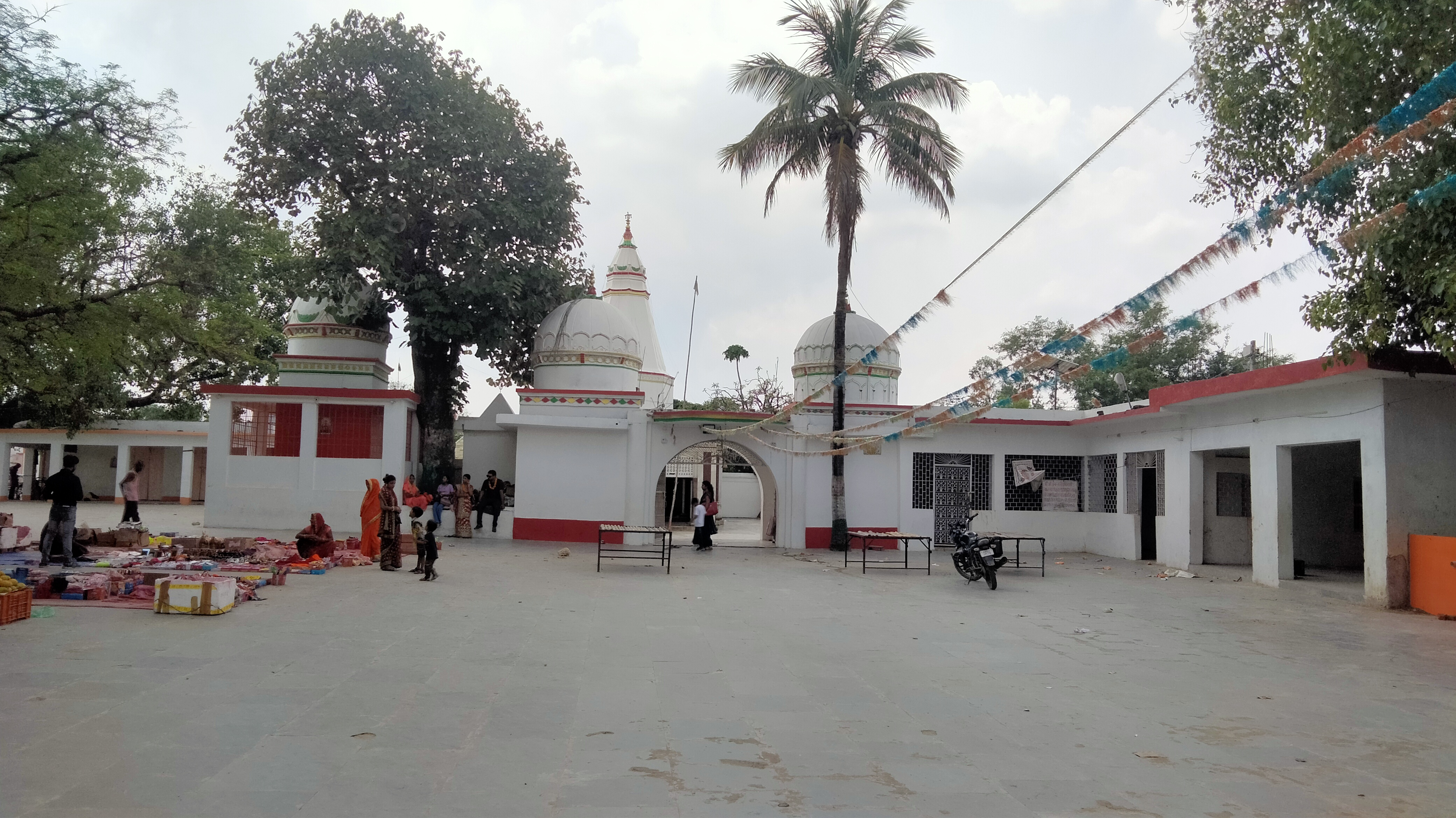
- Girija Sthan
  Girija Sthan Phulhar is the place where Sita used to come daily to worship goddess Girja. There was a flower garden known as Baag Taraag Pushpavatika in which Sita and Lord Rama saw each other for the first time. Hence the name of this place later became Fulhar (Phulhar).
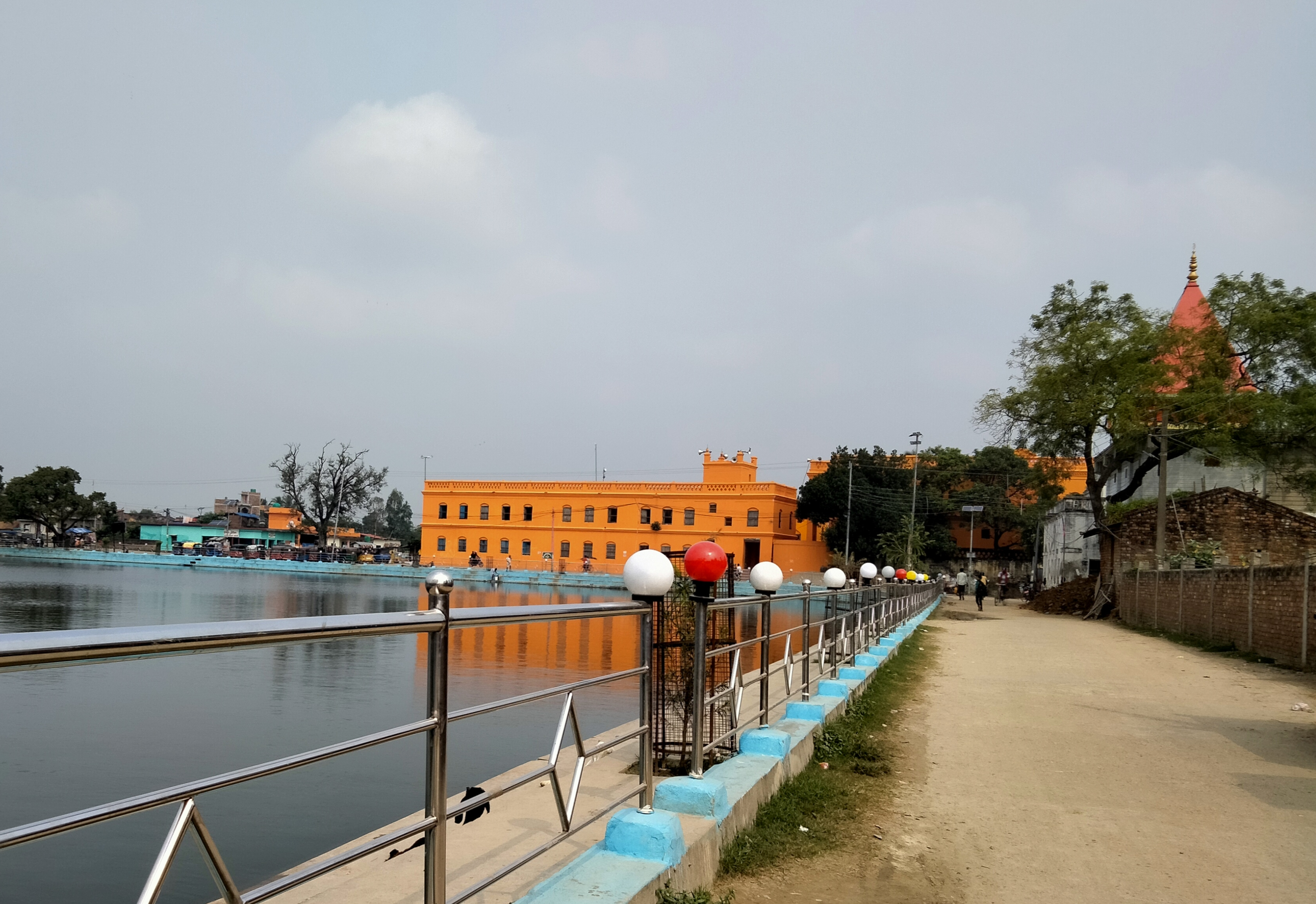
- View of Lakshminarayan Matha at Matihani
  Matihani is located on the Indo-Nepal border near Madhwapur block. This place is quite famous for Mithila Madhya Parikrama. Soil was brought from this place for Matkor in the marriage ceremony of Mata Sita and Lord Shri Rama. Due to this, the place got its name Matihani. Pancheshwar Nath Mahadev Mandir is very famous temple of Lord Shiva near it. A grand fair is held at the historical Parikrama Gachhi near the line of Indo-Nepal International border, during the journey of the Mithila Madhya Parikrama.
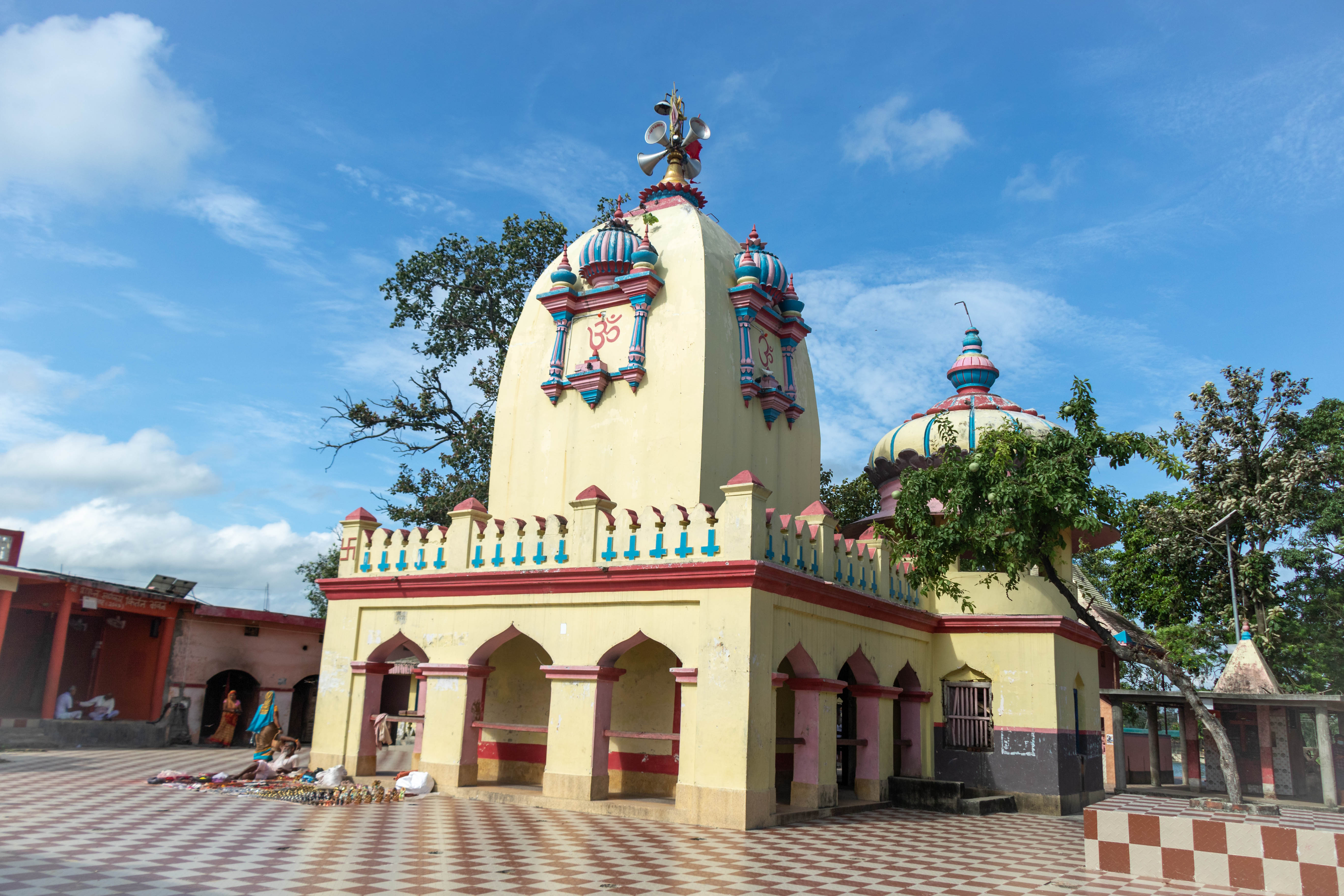
- Jaleshwar Nath Mahadev Mandir
  Jaleshwar Sthan is famous for Lord Shiva temple existing from King Janaka period in Mithila. It was one of the gates of the capital city of Mithila.
- Marai Sthan is the place where Marba (a hut for a marriage ceremony in Hinduism) with a roof of big dried grass was made for the marriage ceremony of the Lord Rama and Goddess Sita in the forest of Mithila.
- Dhurva Kunda is located in Mahottari district of Nepal. This place was the Ashram of Maharshi Dhurva. It is believed that Maharshi Dhurva was a devotee of Lord Vishnu. He performed meditation and turned into a celestial body, the brightest polar star, "Dhurva-tara". It is said that Lord Rama, Laxmana and the sage Vishwamitra paid a visit to Dhurva Kunda during Mithila Darshan.
- Kanchanvan is the place where Lord Rama and Sita played their first Holi after the marriage in Mithila. It is presently located in Mahottari district of Nepal.
- Chhireshwar Mahadev Mandir is at Parvata village of Dhanusha district of Nepal. It is believed to be the third Shivalinga protecting Mithila. It was built by the King Janaka. It is also known as the meeting point of the five mountains. It is also known as Kshireshwornath.
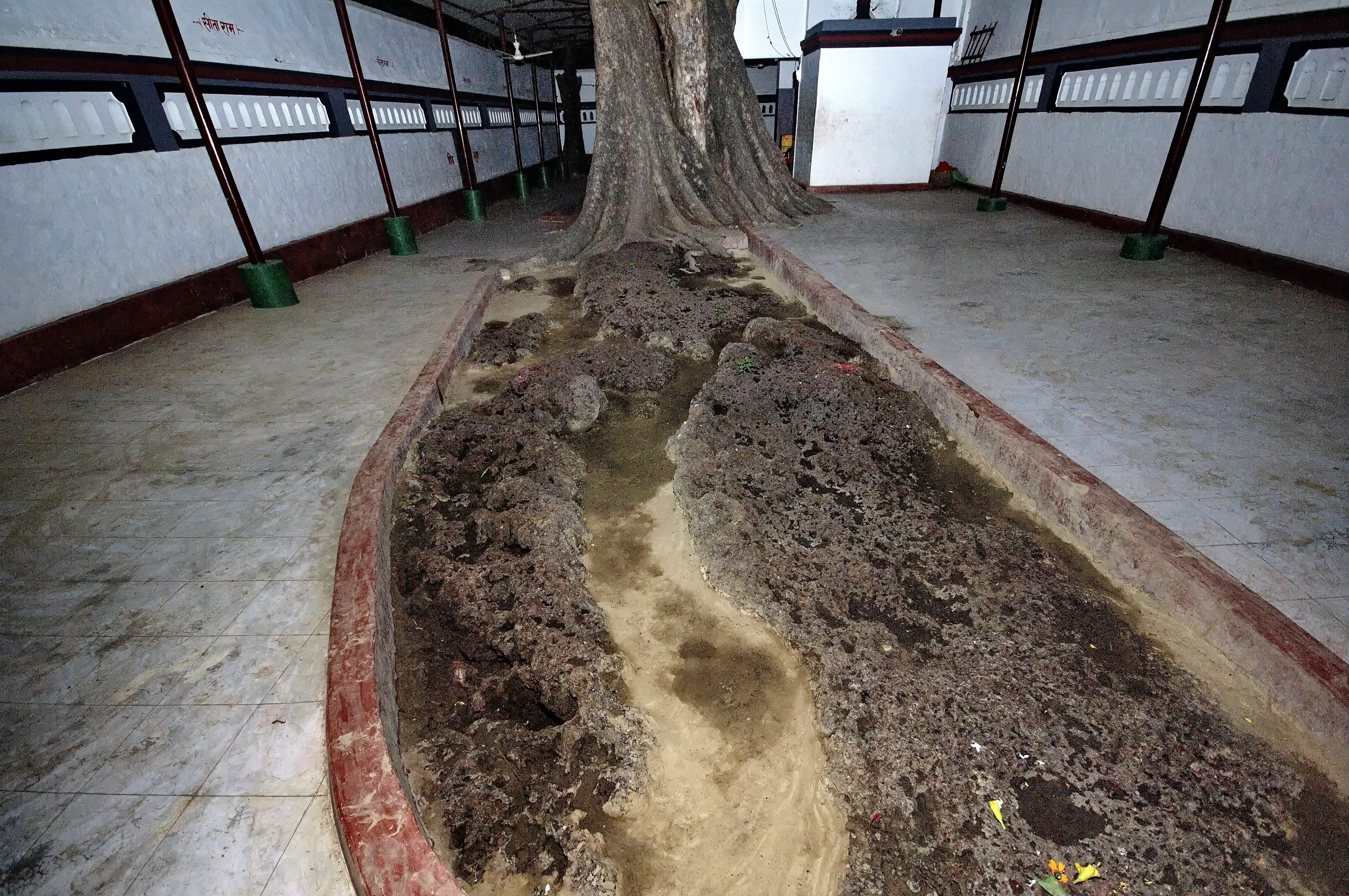
- Dhanusha Dham
  Dhanusha is believed to be the place where the piece of Shiv-Dhanush (bow), named Pinak, fell when Rama tried to use the Dhanush in the Sita-Swayambar. It is located near Janakpur in Nepal.
- Satoshar Sthan is the place related to the Saptrishi Ashram in Mithila. Saptrishi means a group of seven great sage in the ancient times. These seven rishis are Agastya, Atri, Bhardwaja, Gautama, Jamadagni, Vashistha, and Vishvamitra. At this ashram the seven sages had met for their philosophical conferences.There is a temple of Lord Shiva known as Satohar Sthan Mahadev Mandir. It is also located in Mithila part of Nepal.
- Karuna is a village in Madhubani district of Bihar in India. In Mithila, a daughter is offered water to drink before she leaves for the groom's place and it is believed that Sita was offered water at karuna village.
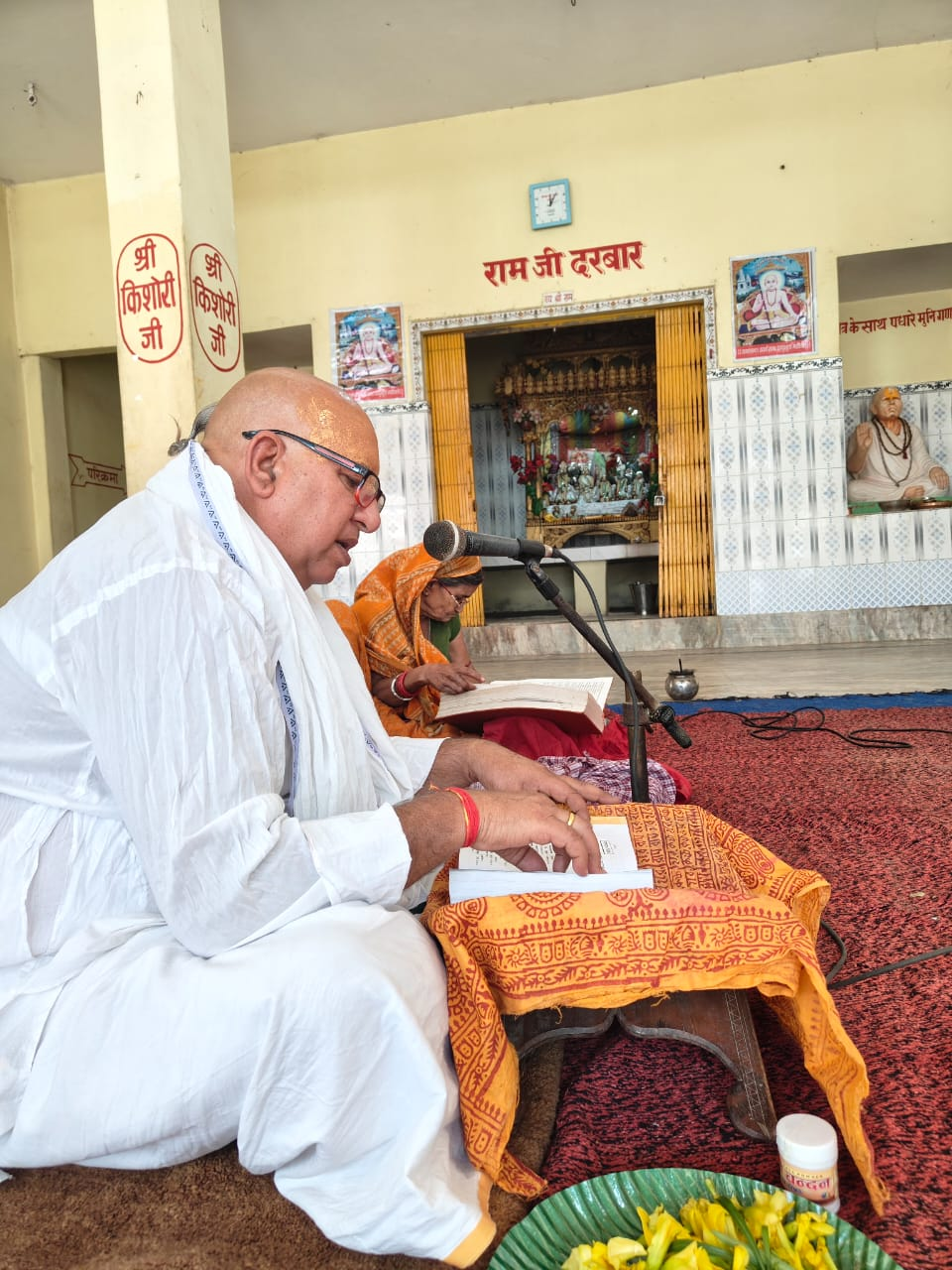
- View of the Ram Ji Darbar at Vishwamitra Ashram.
  Vishwamitra Ashram at Visaul is the ashram of the Indian sage Vishwamitra in Mithila. It is believed that the Ashram was built by the King Janaka for the accommodation of the sage Vishwamitra in Mithila. In this ashram there is a Shivling having four faces around it. The period of the shivling is estimated as of the 9th century.
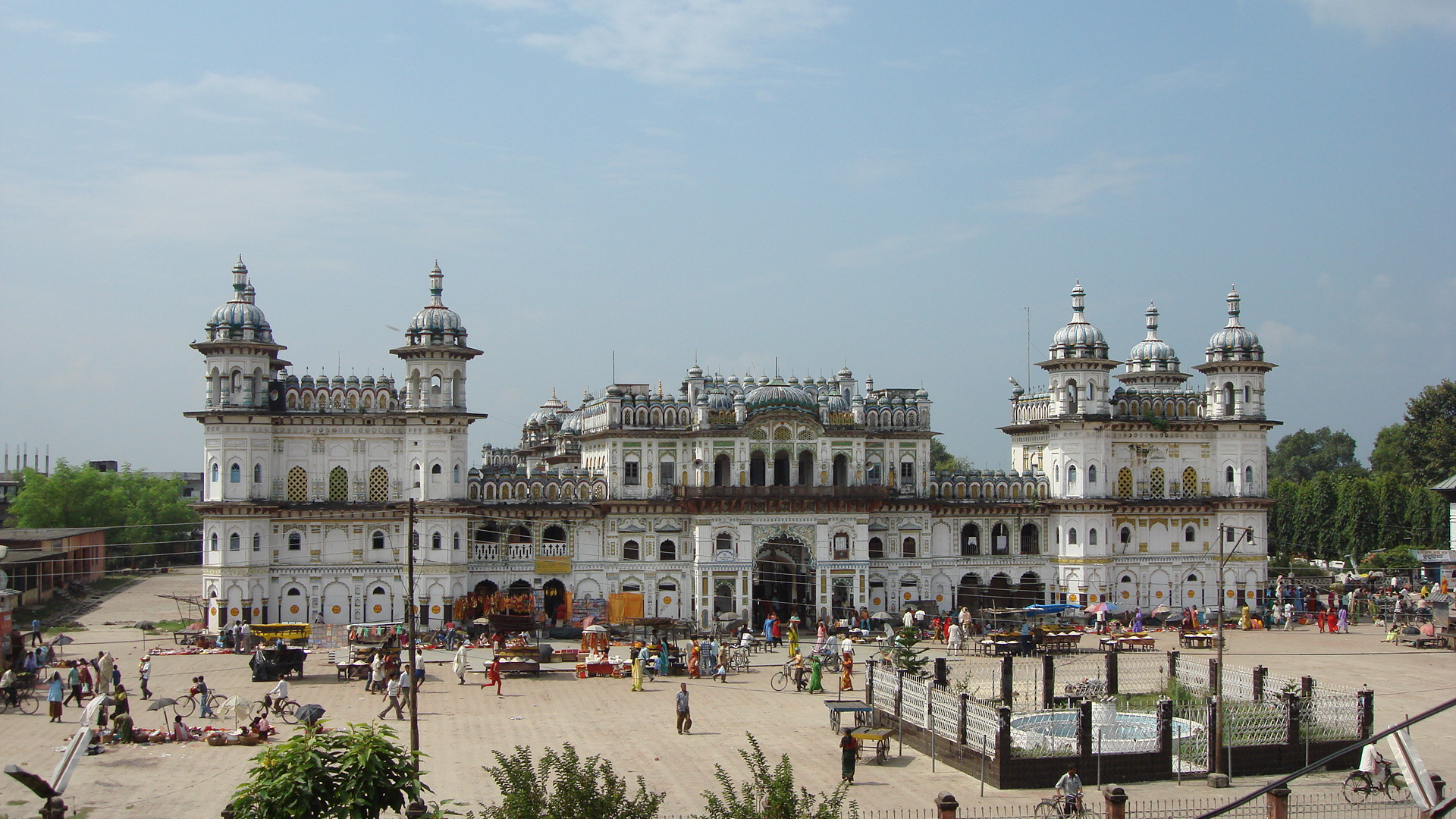
- Janaki Mandir, Janakpur
  Janakpur Dham is believed as the capital city of King Sreedhwaja Janaka in Mithila Kingdom.

== See also ==
- Ram Janmabhoomi, Rama's birthplace
- Janakpur Dham, Sita's birthplace in Nepal
- Punaura Dham, Sita's birthplace in India
- Krishna Janmasthan Temple Complex, Krishna's birthplace
- Kundinapuri, Rukmini's birthplace
- Kaundinyapur, near Nagpur and associated with Rukmini's birthplace Kundinapuri
- Raval, Uttar Pradesh, Radha's birthplace
- Parikrama
- Sitamarhi Dham Parikrama
- Yatra
- Geruka Snaan Mela
