= Dhruva Kund =

- ध्रुव कुंड

Religion
- Affiliation: Hinduism
- Deity: Dhruva, Lord Vishnu, Lord Rama
- Festival: Mithila Madhya Parikrama

Location
- Location: Kanchan Van, Mahottari district, Madhesh Pradesh, Mithila region
- Country: Nepal

Dhruva Kund (Sanskrit: ध्रुव कुंड) is an ancient site in the Mithila region of Nepal related to the Vedic sage Dhruva. It is located near Kanchan Van in Mahottari district of Madhesh Pradesh, Nepal. Dhruva Kund is also part of Mithila Madhya Parikrama.

== Description ==
Dhurva Kunda is located in Mahottari district of Nepal. This place was the Ashram of Maharshi Dhurva. It is believed that Maharshi Dhurva was a devotee of Lord Vishnu. He performed meditation and turned into a celestial body, the brightest polar star, “Dhurva-tara”. It is said that Lord Rama, Lord Laxmana and the sage Vishwamitra paid a visit to Dhruva Kunda during Mithila Darshan. Presently during the Mithila Madhya Parikrama, the Dhruva Kund is the seventh Paraw which comes on Shashthi day of the Parikrama. There is a temple known as Dhruva Mandir on the bank of Dhruva Kund.

== See also ==
- Dhruva
- Mithila Madhya Parikrama
- Rama's Journey in Mithila
