= Mithila Bihari Mandir =

Hindu temple in Mithila

- मिथिला बिहारी मंदिर
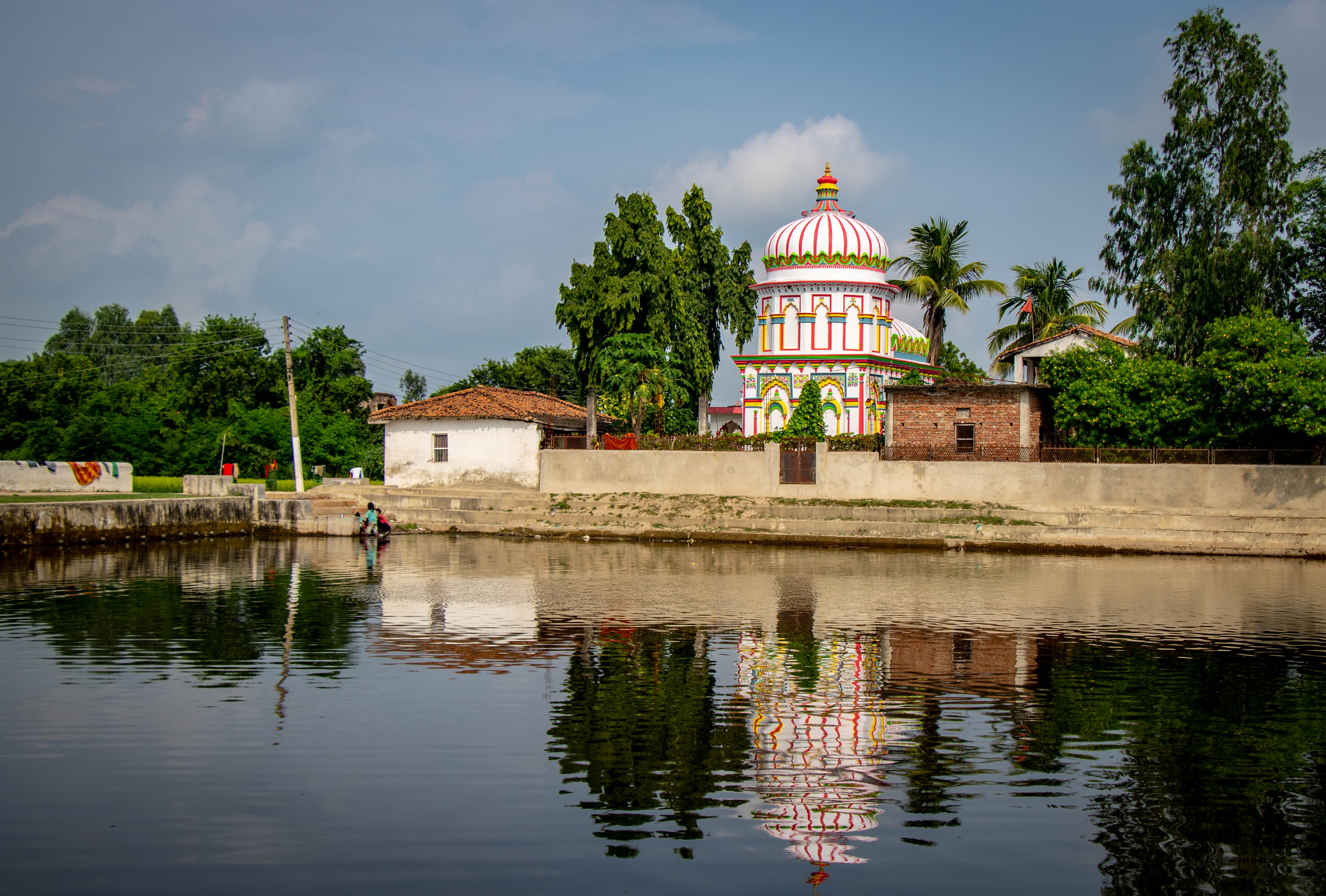
- Mithila Bihari Mandir at Kachuri Dham

Religion
- Affiliation: Hinduism
- District: Dhanusha district
- Province: Madhesh Pradesh
- Deity: Lord Rama
- Festival: Mithila Madhya Parikrama
- Governing body: Mithila Bihari Management Committee

Location
- Location: Kachuri Dham, Mithila region
- Country: Nepal
- Interactive map of Mithila Bihari Mandir
- Coordinates: 26.7788611°N 85.9812187°E

Mithila Bihari Mandir (Maithili: मिथिला बिहारी मंदिर) is a historical Hindu temple located at Kachuri Dham in the Dhanusha district of the Mithila region in the Himalayan nation of Nepal. The Mithila Madhya Parikrama starts its journey from the Mithila Bihari Mandir.

== Description ==
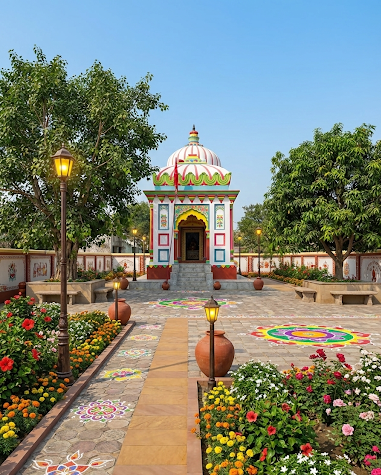
View of the front side of the temple of Mithila Bihari.

Mithila Bihari Mandir is dedicated to Lord Rama. It is at a distance of approximately three kilometres from the capital city Janakpur of the Mithila region in Nepal. It is estimated to be around 500 years old. The Dola of Lord Rama called as Mithila Bihari Dola is carried out every year on the first day of the circumambulation Mithila Madhya Parikrama from this temple. The temple is managed by an organisation called Mithila Bihari Management Committee. The present chairman of the committee is Ajay Jha. Similarly the rituals of the temple is looked after and performed by a Mahant (head priest). The present Mahant of the temple is Ram Naresh Sharan.
