= Karuna Gaon =

Legendary village in Mithila

Karuna Karuna Gaon
- Village
- Karuna
- Interactive map of Karuna
- Country: India
- State: Bihar
- Region: Mithila
- District: Madhubani
- Block: Harlakhi
- Founder: King Janaka
- Demonym: Maithil
- A major destination of Mithila Madhya Parikrama

Karuna Gaon is a legendary village in the Mithila region of Bihar in India. It is located in the Harlakhi block of the Madhubani district in the state of Bihar in India. It is simply called as Karuna. It is situated near Indo-Nepal border area. There is a legendary pond known as Ram Sagar Pokhair related to the epic Ramayana in the village. It is a part of the spiritual journey Mithila Madhya Parikrama in the region. It is one of the major fifteen destinations in the path of the historical Mithila Madhya Parikrama.

== Description ==
Every year on the thirteenth day of the spiritual journey Mithila Madhya Parikrama, a very large number of devotees, Shadhu-Saints and travellers flock into the village of Karuna. There they stay and take rest at the bank of the legendary pond Ram Sagar. The native residents of the village welcome these devotees as their guests and provide services to them.

== Legend ==
In Mithila, a daughter is offered water to drink before she leaves for the groom's place. It is believed that the princess Sita of Mithila was offered water at the karuna village when she was leaving the palace of her father King Janaka and going to her groom's palace in Ayodhya after her marriage with Lord Rama. The legendary location in the village where this ritual was performed is presently known as Ramsagar Pokhair. Nowadays, it is a sacred pond for the pilgrimage of the Mithila Madhya Parikrama.
