= Phulhar =

Site in Hindu mythology

Phulhar फुलहर
- Village
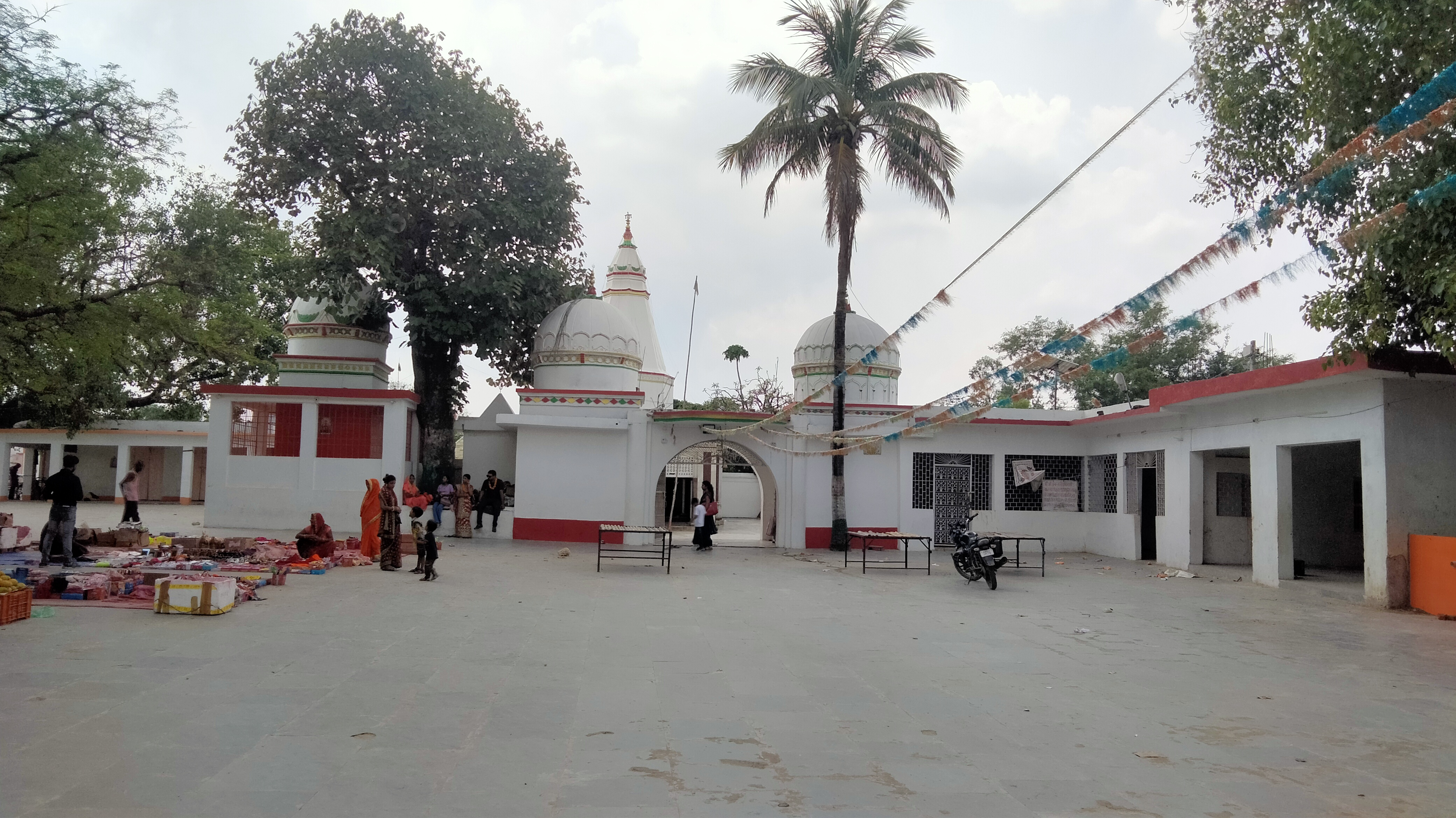
- Campus of the Girija Sthan Dham in the Phulhar village

- Location in Bihar, India
- Coordinates: 26.3509°N 85.5430°E
- Country: India
- State: Bihar
- District: Madhubani
- Police station: Harlakhi police station
- Railway Station: Khajauli railway station
- Sub-Divisional Magistrate: Benipatti sub-division
- Block: Harlakhi block
- Founded by: Janaka
- Seat: Government of Bihar

Government
  - Type: Panchayat
  - Body: Gram panchayat

Population
  - Total: 5,638
  - Estimate (2022): 6,315
- Demonym: Maithil

Language
  - Official: Hindi

Regional languages
  - Mother tongue: Ancient: Maithili; Sanskrit
- Postal code: 847240

Phulhar is a village in Madhubani district of the state of Bihar, India. Phulhar is known for first meeting place between Lord Rama and Goddess Sita. It is also believed to be a flower garden belonging to King Janaka of Mithila. A temple of the Hindu goddess Bhagwati known as Girija Sthan is situated in this village. This location is referenced in numerous ancient Indian Hindu religious texts. This place has been recognised by the Government of Bihar in 2020 as tourist centre for Hindu pilgrims. This place is related to Lord Rama and has been identified as one of the locations in the Ramayana circuit. The, then Chief Minister of Bihar, Nitish Kumar has announced to develop this place as a tourist destination during his Pragati Yatra on 12 January 2025. The government has sanctioned 31 crore 13 lakh and 55 thousand rupees as a development fund, which will be used for beautification and modernization of the ancient Bagh Tarag Pushpavatika and the campus of Girija Devi Mandir.

== Description ==
According to Shree Ramcharitmanas, mother Sunayana sent princess Sita to this place for worshiping the Hindu goddess Girija. There Rama and Lakshmana also came to pick up some flowers for their teacher Vishwamitra to worshiping. In the garden Rama and Sita saw each other for the first time in their life. There is a pond known as Bagh Tarag, which is mentioned at Doha number 227 in Bal Kand of Ramayana composed by Tulsidas.

According to legend, it is said that the princess Sita of the Mithila Kingdom used to come regularly for twelve years to Phulhar village for worshipping Girija Devi at the temple located on the campus of Raj Udyan of King Janaka there. Girija Devi was considered the Kuldevi of King Janaka in Mithila. It is the place from where the story of the marriage of Rama and Sita started. Nearby the village there is another ancient temple known as Manokamna Mandir at Kamtaul village associated with the Girija Sthan.

== Gallery ==
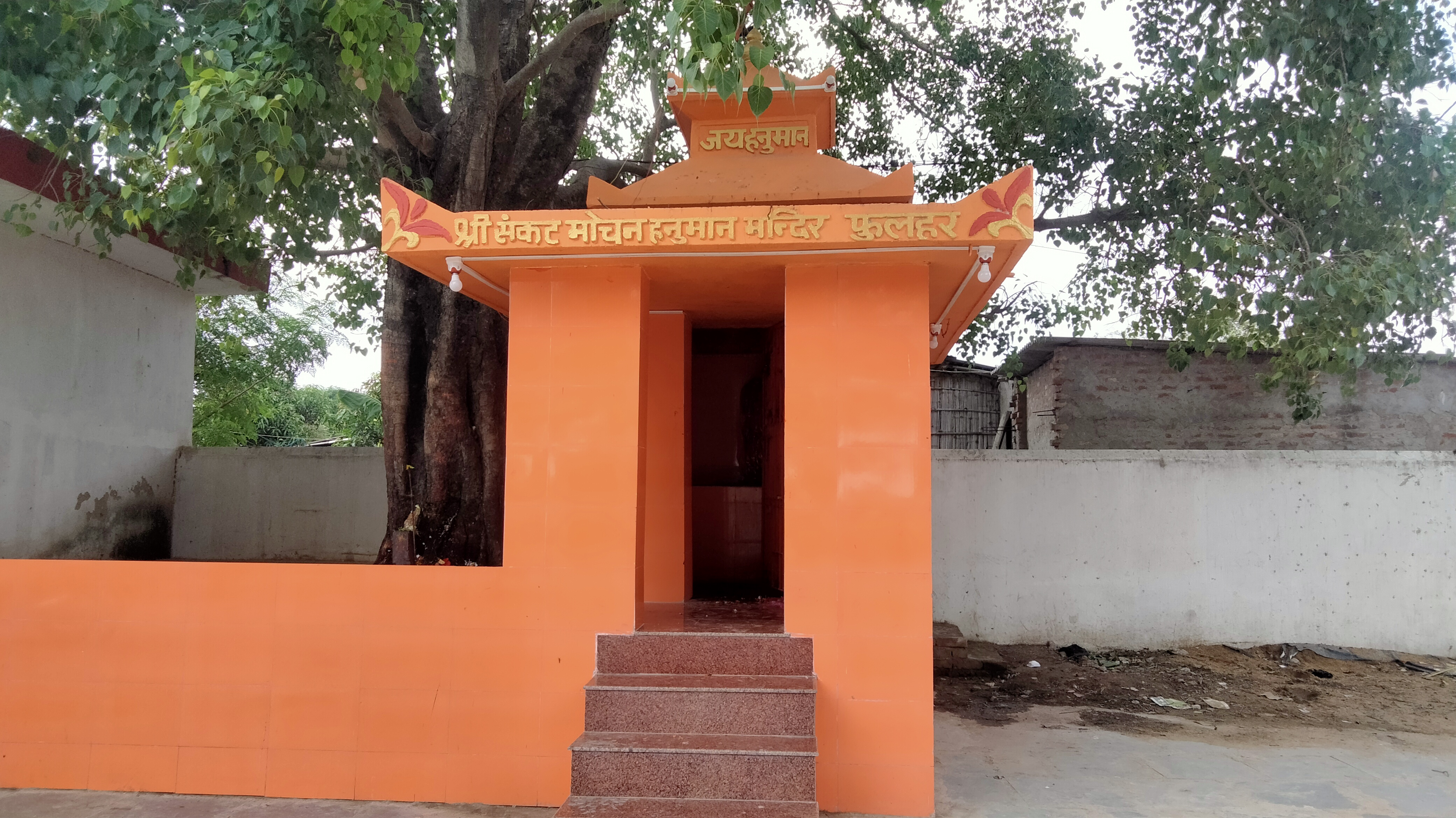
Shree Sankat Mochan Hanuman Mandir at Girija Sthan Dham in Phulhar.

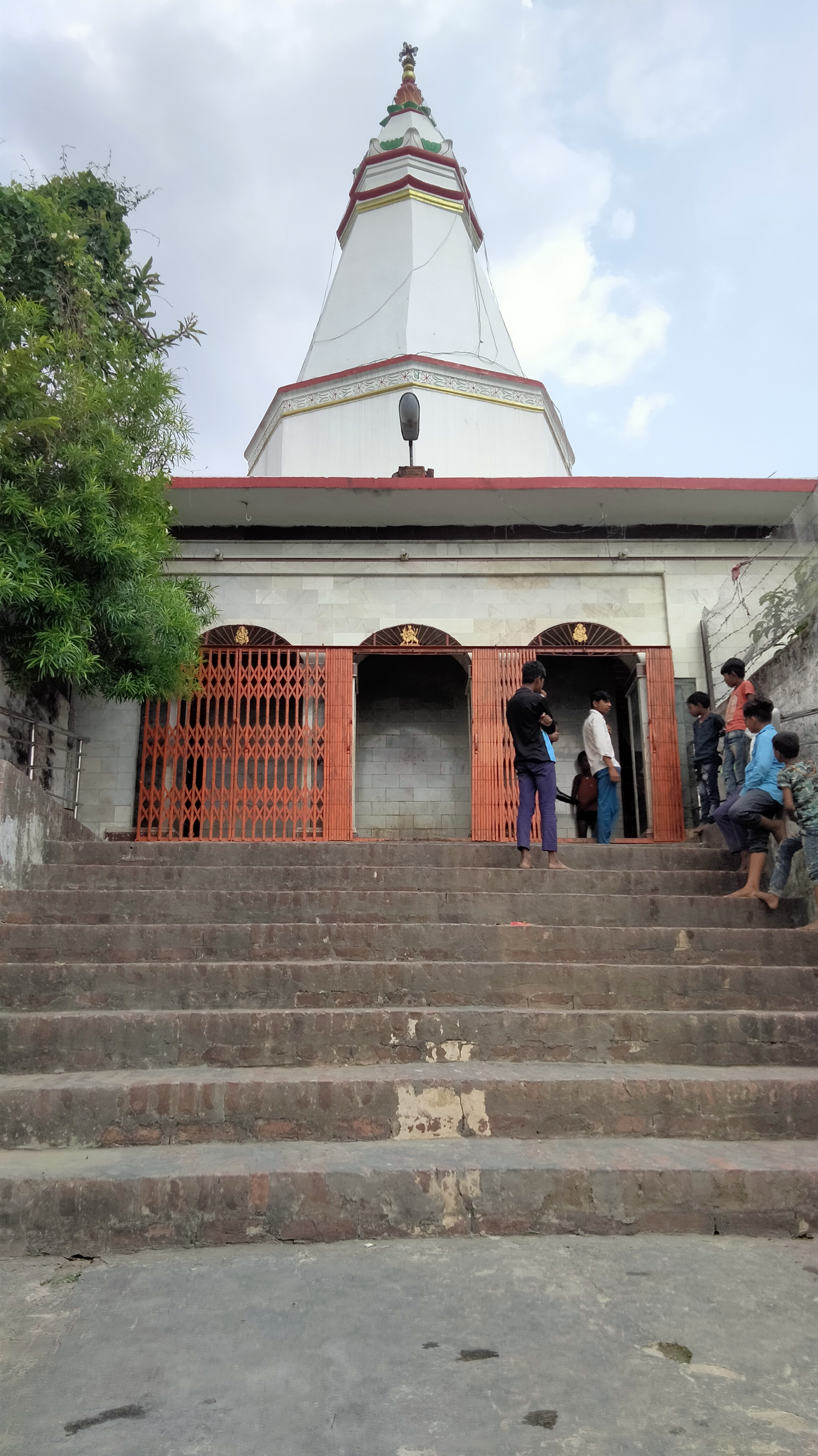
View of Girija Devi Mandir from backside of the temple.

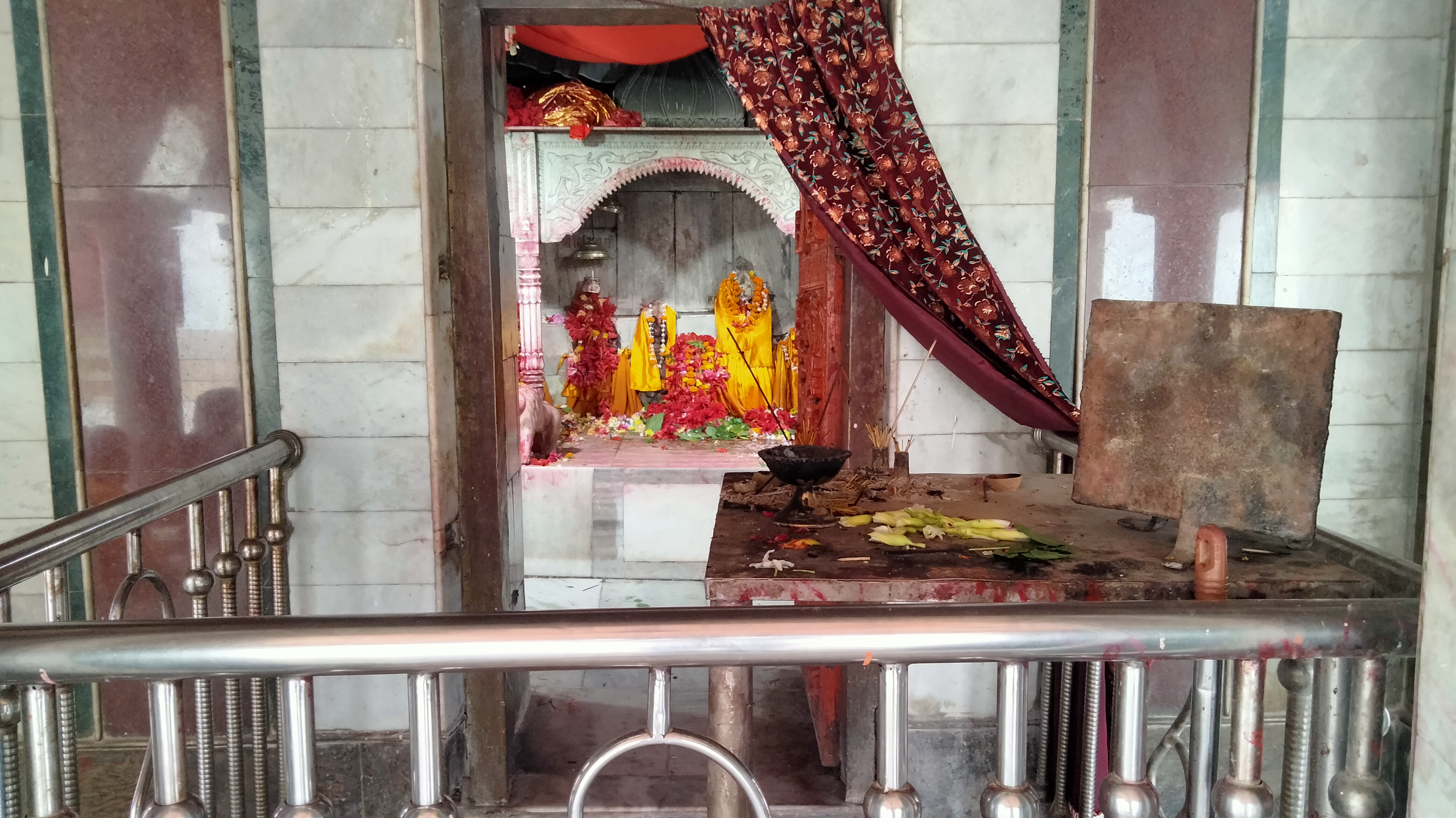
Girija Devi Darbar inside the temple.

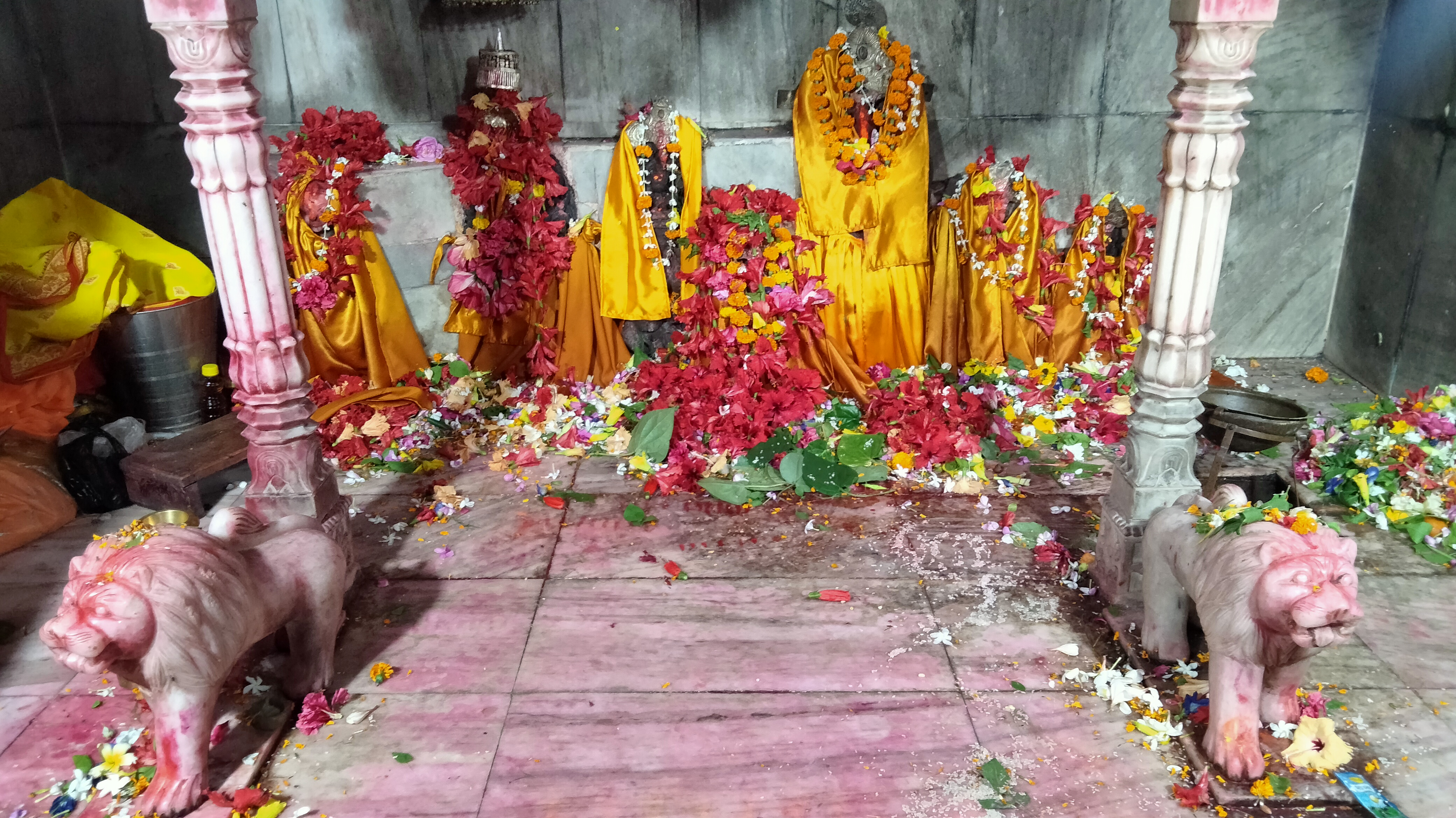
Idols inside Girija Devi Mandir.

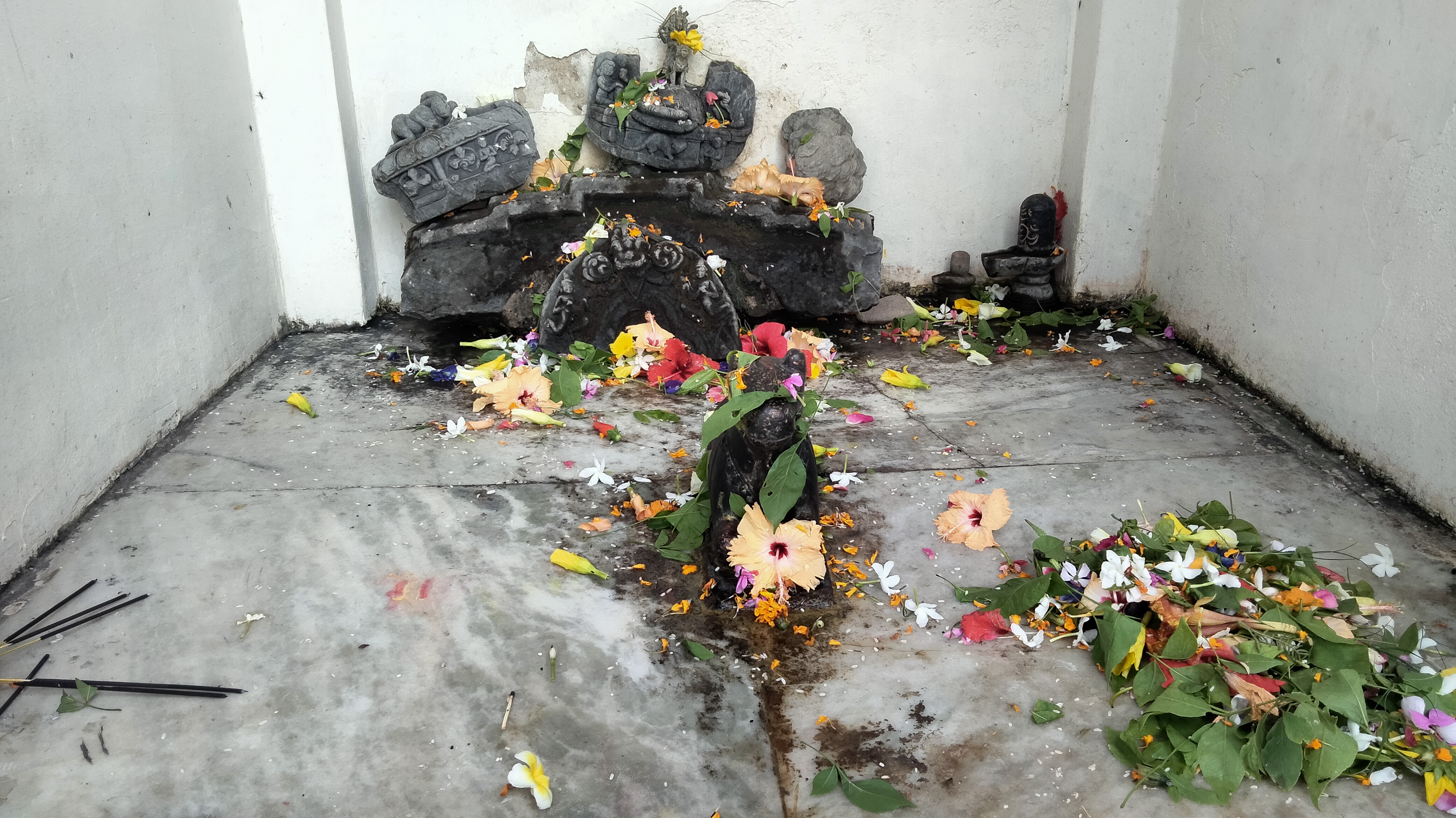
Ancient archaeological remains kept at a temple in the campus of the Girija Sthan Dham.

== See also ==
- Vishwamitra Ashram, Bisaul
- Mithila Madhya Parikrama
- Kalyaneshwar Mahadev Mandir
