= Vishwamitra Ashram, Bisaul =

Vishwamitra Gurukul of the Ancient Mithila University

- विश्वामित्र आश्रम
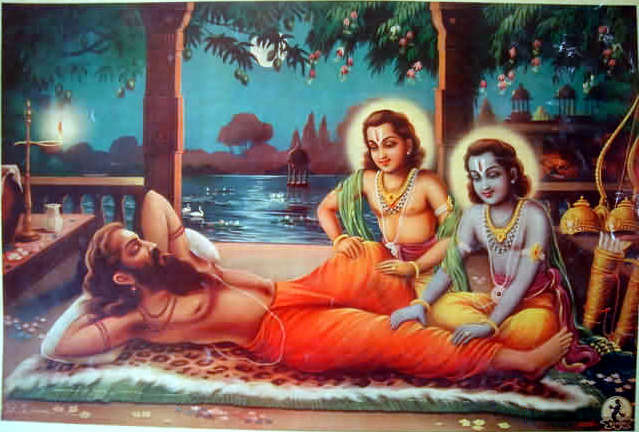
- Symbolic image - Disciples Lord Rama and Lord Lakshmana performing guru-seva by pressing Vishvamitra's feet and legs (bazaar art, mid-1900's)
- Interactive map of Vishwamitra Ashram, Bisaul

Monastery information
- Full name: Shree Ram - Lakhan - Vishwamitra Bishram Ashram
- Other name: Sundar Sadan
- Established: Treta Yuga
- Dedication: Indian philosophy, Gayatri Mantra
- Celebration: Mithila Madhya Parikrama

People
- Founder: Vishwamitra
- House superior: Present Mahant - Brajmohan Das
- Important associated figures: Lord Rama, Lord Lakshmana, Guru Vishwamitra

Site
- Location: Bisaul village, Harlakhi Block, Madhubani district
- Country: India
- Coordinates: 26°37′31″N 85°59′47″E
- Other information: Related to Ancient Mithila University

Vishwamitra Ashram at Bisaul village of Madhubani district in the Mithila region of Bihar was the residence place related to the Vedic sage Vishwamitra in Ramayana. It is located near the capital city Janakpur of ancient Mithila Kingdom.

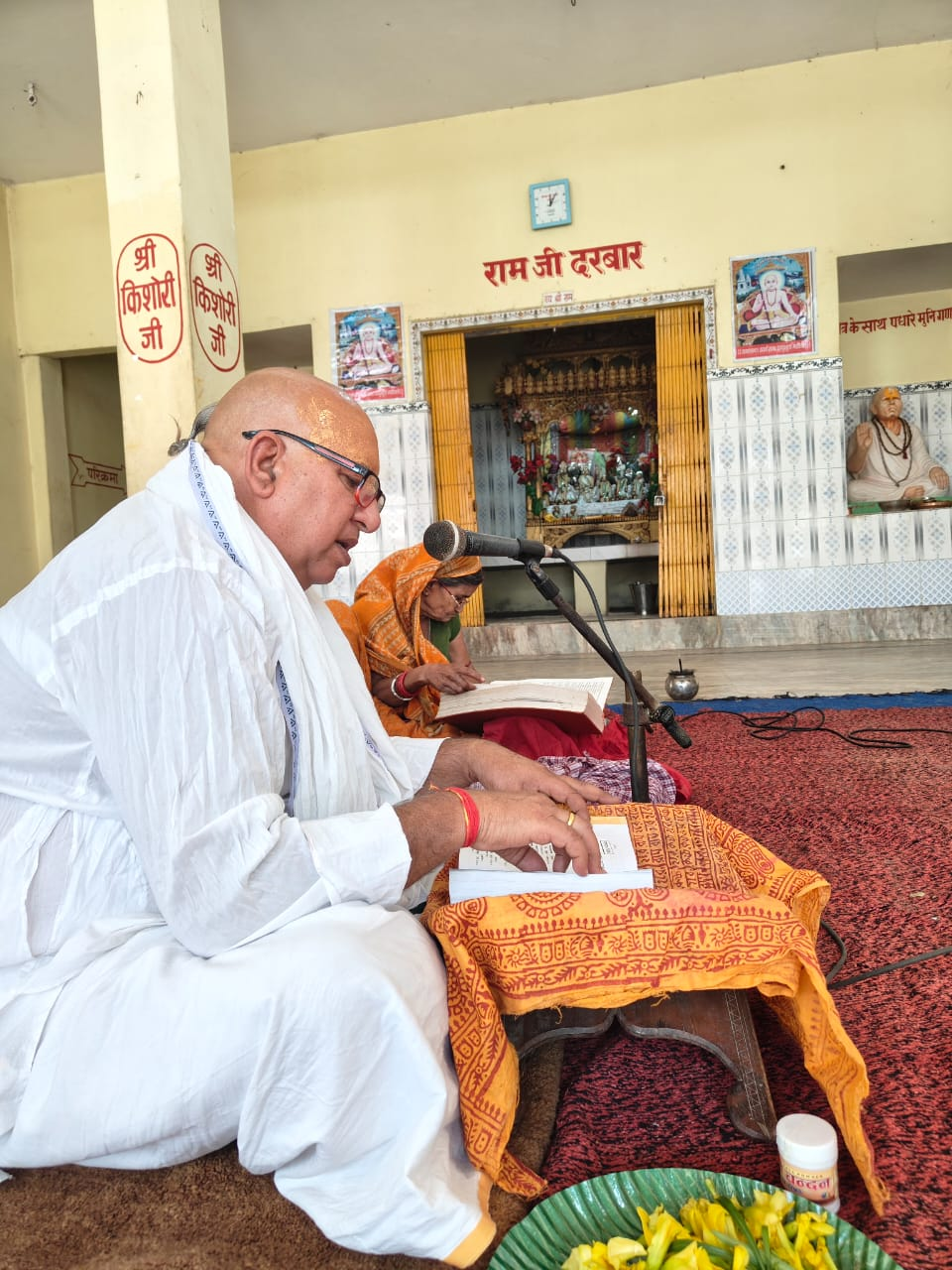
View of the present Mahant Brajmohan Dasji of the ashram chanting scripture in the premises.

== Description ==
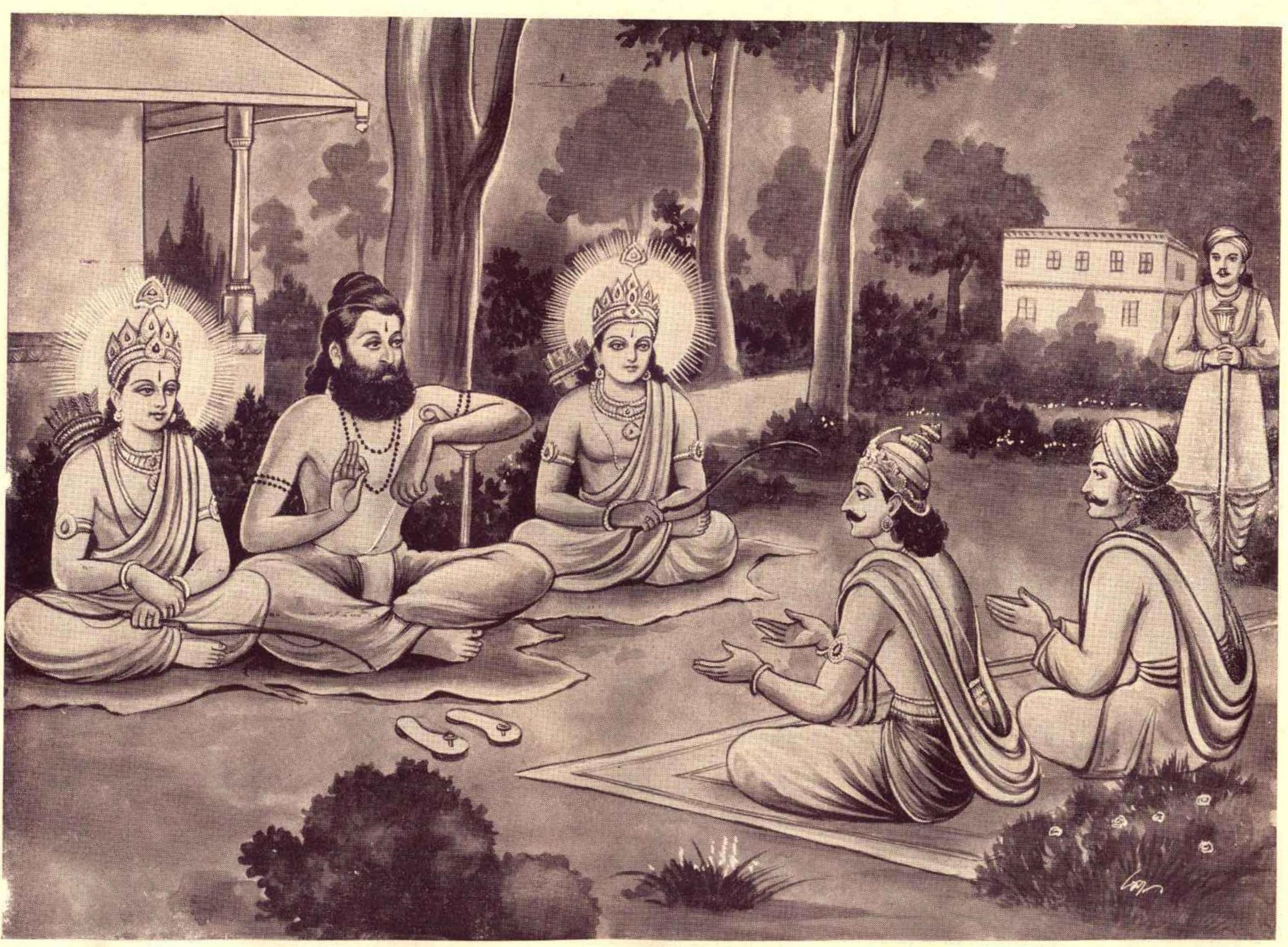
The image is depicting the King Janaka meeting with Vishwamitra Rishi at the ashram

In Ramayana, Lord Rama and Lord Lakshmana went to the Vishwamitra Ashram from the Gautam Ashram in the ancient Mithila Kingdom with their teacher Vishwamitra. It is said that during the arrival of the princes Lord Rama and Lord Lakshmana in Mithila, Guru Vishwamitra stayed with them in Vishaul and rested for the night. Vishwamitra Ashram is also the part of Mithila Madhya Parikrama. It was located at the royal mango garden of the King Janaka. It was built by the King Shreedhwaj Janaka of Mithila as the residence place for the Vedic sage Vishwamitra. There is a small village nearby called as Phulhar witnessed the first meeting of the Prince Lord Rama and Princess Goddess Sita in Treta Yuga era. When both brothers Lord Rama and Lord Lakshmana were staying in the Vishwamitra Ashram Vishaul and they went to the royal flower garden of the King Janaka known as Baag Taraag Pushpavatika to pluck flowers for their Guru Vishwamitra, Goddess Sita was also there for worshiping Goddess Girija.

The present Mahant of the Vishwamitra Ashram is Brajmohan Das also called Brijmohandas Ji Maharaj.

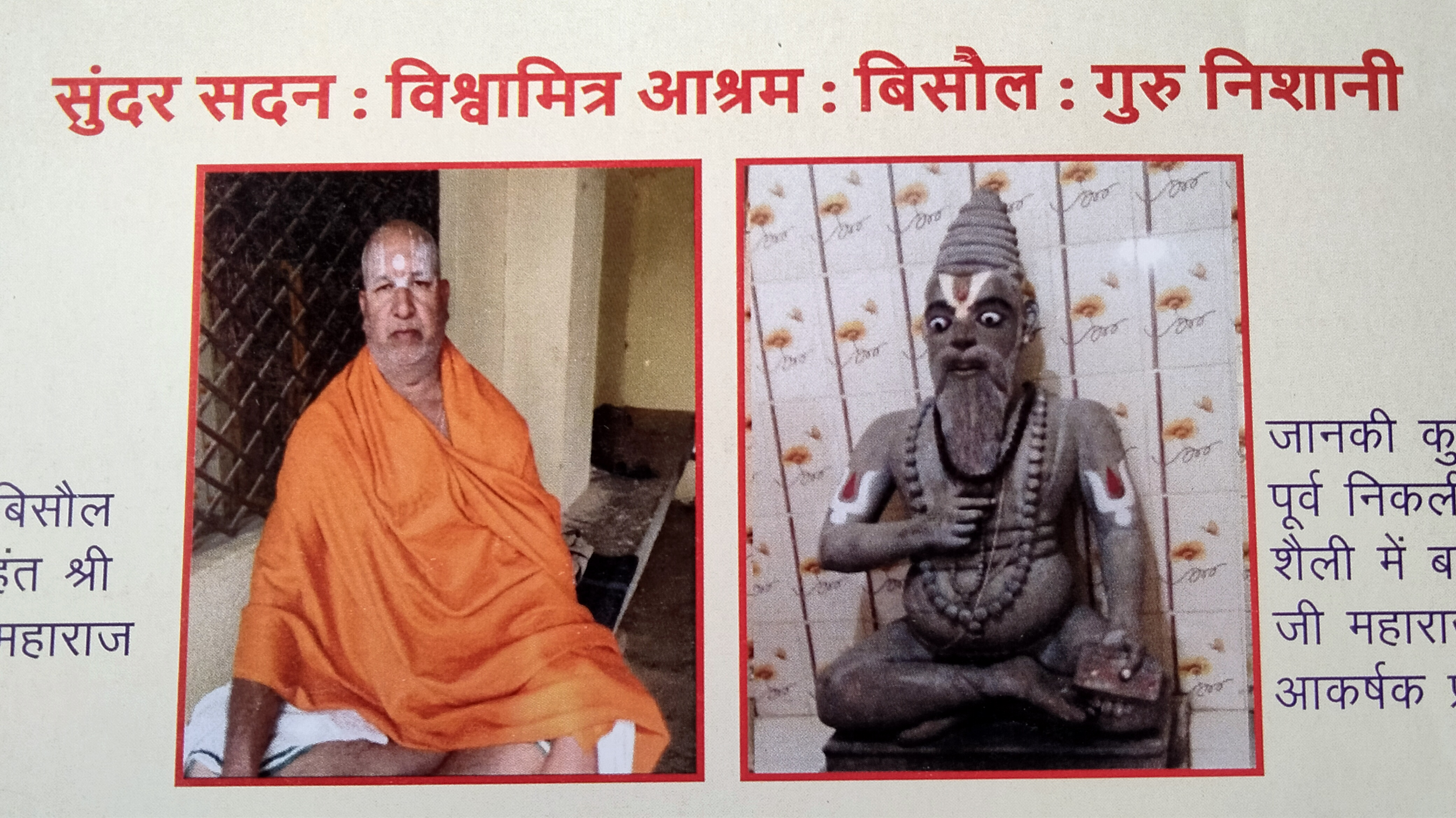
In the picture, the right hand side image is showing the ancient statue of the Guru Vishwamitra established at the ashram and the left hand side image is of the present Mahant Brijmohandas Ji Maharaj of the ashram.

== Upgradation ==
The Government of Bihar in India has recognised the place of the Vishwamitra Ashram as a tourist destination for the Hindu pilgrimage. The government has planned to develop the legendary site as a tourist destination. On 11 May 2026, the government has announced a budget of 13 crore 28 lakh 63 thousand Indian rupees for the development works of the legendary site.
