= Kanchanvan =

Legendary place in Mithila

Kanchanvan (Maithili: कंचनवन) or Kanchanban is a legendary place in the Mithila region of the Indian subcontinent. It is related to the epic Ramayana in Hinduism. It is located in the Bhangaha Municipality of the Mahottari district in the province of Madhesh Pradesh in Nepal. It is situated near the bank of the Viraja river. It is an important destination in the pilgrimage of the Mithila Madhya Parikrama. According to legend, it is believed that the divine couple Lord Rama and Goddess Sita played their first Holi celebration at the Kanchanvan in Mithila. The festival of Holi in Hinduism is the major popular festival celebrated in the village due to its association with epic legend.
