= Kachuri Thera =

Coordinates: 26°47′N 85°58′E

Kachuri कचुरी
- Village development committee
- Nickname: Mithala Bihari
- Interactive map of Kachuri
- Country: Nepal
- Zone: Janakpur Zone
- District: Dhanusa District

Population (1991)
  - Total: 4,560
- Time zone: UTC+5:45 (Nepal Time)

Kachuri is a village development committee in Dhanusa District in the Janakpur Zone of south-eastern Nepal. Here is big temple of Lord Rama known as Mithila Bihari Mandir. At the time of the 1991 Nepal census it had a population of 4,560 persons living in 818 individual households.
