= Bisaul =

Village in Bihar

- Village
- Visaul
- Interactive map of Bisaul
- Coordinates: 26.6262039°N 86.0032182°E
- Country: India
- State: Bihar
- Region: Mithila region
- District: Madhubani district
- Block: Harlakhi
- Founder: Vishwasa Devi
- Named for: Vishwasa Devi
- Demonym: Maithil
- Capital of Mithila during the period of queen Vishwasa Devi of Oiniwar Dynasty

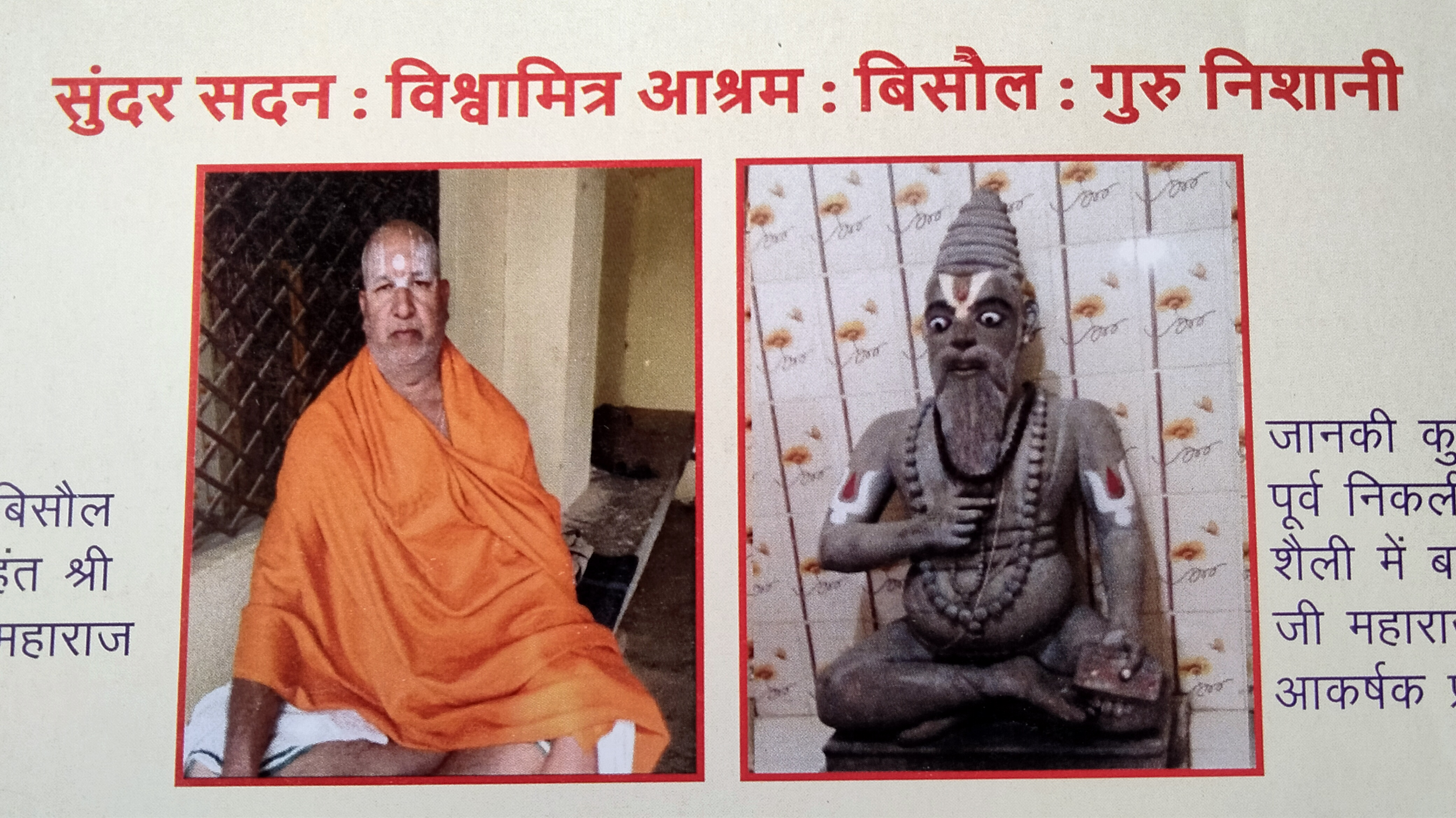
Vishvamitra Ashram, located in Bishaul village, is a historical site In Left: The current saint of Vishvamitra Ashram. In Right: The idol of Maharishi Vishvamitra ji located in Bishaul

Bishaul also known as Vishaul is a historical village in the Mithila region of Bihar in India. It is situated in the Madhubani district of Bihar. The village was founded by the queen Vishwasa Devi of the Oiniwar Dynasty in the Mithila Kingdom. There are differents religions and caste people are there in this village like Hindusm(Brahmin (Maithil Brahmin), Rajput,Mandal, Yadav, Koeri (Kushwaha), Kurmi, Bhumihar, Teli, Baniya, Kayastha, Musahar, Dom, Paswan (Dusadh), Chamar, Mallah (Nishad), Dhanuk, Kumhar, Nai, Dhobi etc.) and Muslim(Ansari, Sheikh, Pathan, Ashraf, Rayn, Sayyid )

== Description ==
According to historians, the village of Bisaul was founded by the queen Vishwasa Devi after her name. She transferred the capital of Mithila from Padma to Bisaul around 1431 CE. The Maithili poet cum political advisor Vidyapati came to the capital of the queen Vishwasa Devi for assisting her in the state affairs and administrations.

The existence of the village can also be traced from the period of Ramayana. In the village there is a pilgrimage site known as Vishwamitra Ashram believed to be the location where Guru Vishwamitra, Lord Rama and Lakshmana stayed for a night before arriving in the Sita Swayamvara Shabha at the court of King Janaka in Mithila. Similarly during the annual Mithila Madhya Parikrama, the village of Bisaul is the second last destination for the devotees and travellers of the circumambulation.

In the early times, the village was a prominent seat of Vedic learning in Mithila. The royal court of the queen Vishwasa Devi in the village was a centre of attraction for the Vedic scholars at that time.

Bisaul is also known for its religious festivals like Durga Puja and Kali Puja which are widely celebrated in the village.

== Geography ==
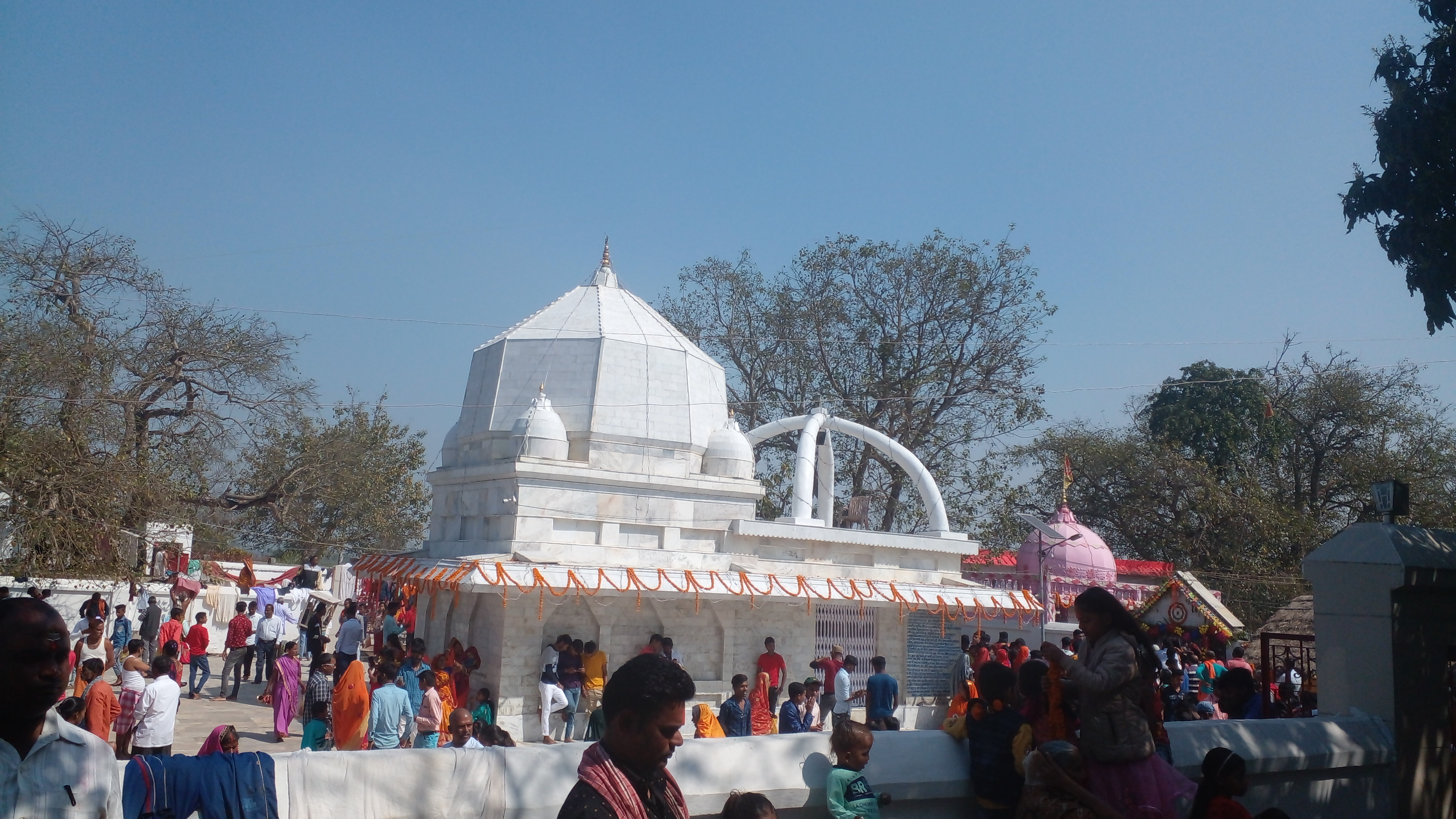
Kalaneshwar Mahadev temple near Bishaul Village

Bisaul village spans an area of approximately 936.8 hectares. The village is situated in the Mithila region of Bihar and is part of the Harlakhi administrative block. the village is situated with Nepal to its north, Kalna village to the south, Karuna to the east, and Harlakhi to the west.

== Demographics ==
As of the 2011 Census of India, Bishaul has a total population of 8,172 individuals residing in 1,693 households. The gender distribution comprises 4,298 males and 3,874 females, resulting in a sex ratio of 901 females per 1,000 males. Children aged 0–6 years constitute 17% of the population, numbering 1,384 individuals (742 males and 642 females). The child sex ratio stands at 865 females per 1,000 males.

The literacy rate in Bishaul is 60.49%, with male literacy at 72.22% and female literacy at 47.59%. Scheduled Castes make up 13.3% of the population, totaling 1,087 individuals, while there is no recorded Scheduled Tribe population in the village.

== Administration ==
Bisaul is administered under the Panchayati Raj system, with the Karuna Gram Panchayat serving as the local governing body. The village is part of the Harlakhi Block within the Madhubani district.

== Infrastructure ==
The village has access to basic amenities, including drinking water facilities primarily through hand pumps. As of the 2011 census, there were no public or private bus services directly within the village.

== Education ==
Bisaul hosts educational institutions up to the primary level. For higher education, residents typically rely on facilities in nearby towns and cities.

== Economy ==
Agriculture is the predominant occupation in Bishaul, with most residents engaged in farming and related activities. The village lacks significant industrial development, and employment opportunities are primarily within the agricultural sector.
