= Girija Sthan =

Legendary temple of Goddess Girija Devi

- गिरिजा स्थान
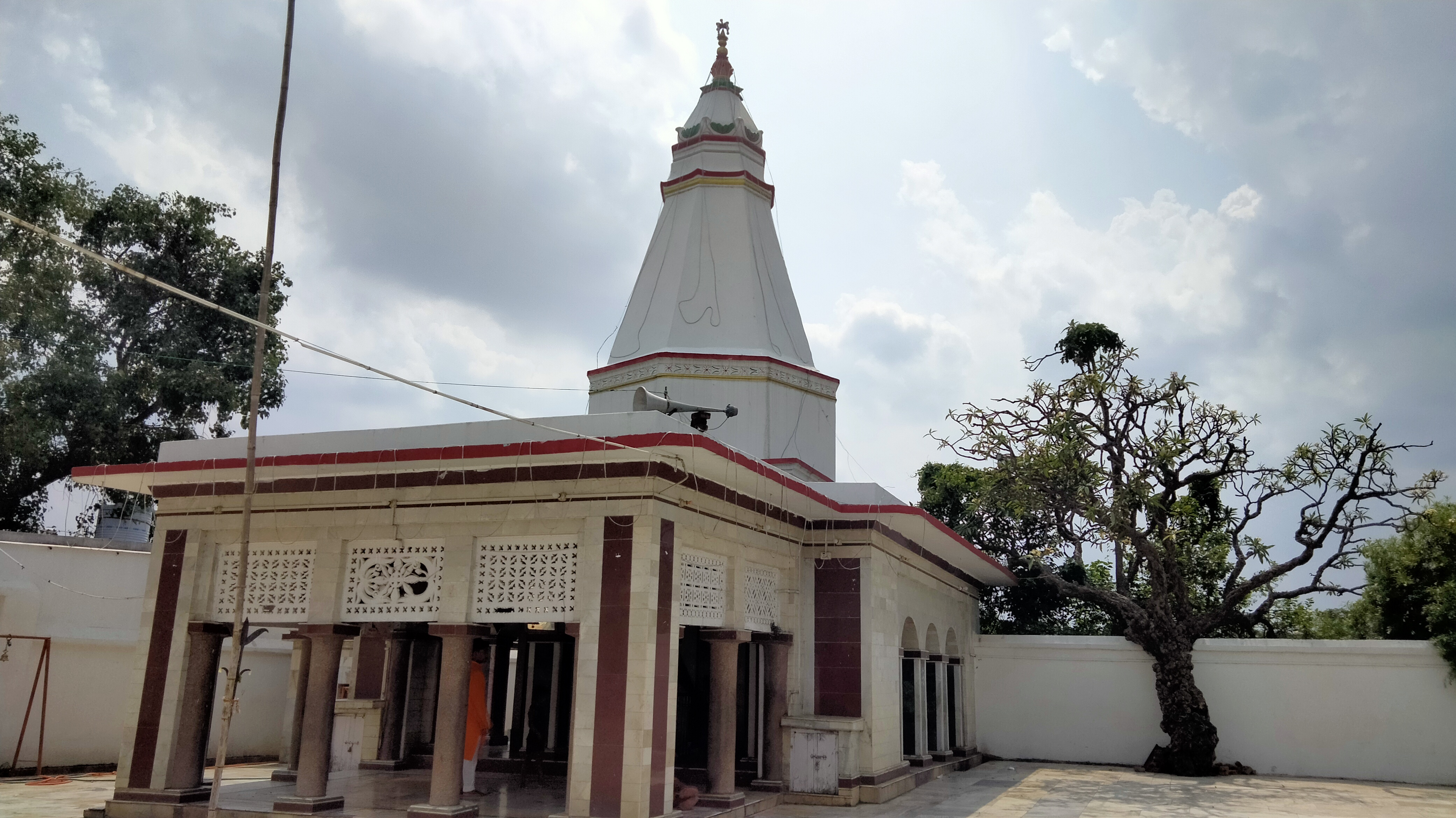
- Girija Devi Mandir

Religion
- Affiliation: Hinduism
- District: Madhubani
- Deity: Girija Devi

Location
- Location: Phulhar, Mithila
- State: Bihar
- Country: India
- Interactive map of Girija Sthan
- Coordinates: 26.5854645°N 85.9065390°E

Architecture
- Founder: King Janaka
- Established: Treta Yuga
- Girija Sthan Dham

Girija Sthan (Maithili: गिरिजा स्थान) is a legendary place related to the Ramayana in the Mithila region of India. It is located at the Phulhar village in the Harlakhi block of the Madhubani district in the state of Bihar in India. It refers to the temple of Goddess Girija in the village. It is also known as Girija Devi Mandir. It is one of the major fifteen destinations in the holy circumambulation of the Mithila Madhya Parikrama in the Indian subcontinent. It has been recognised as a tourist destination in the Ramayana circuit developed by Government of India.

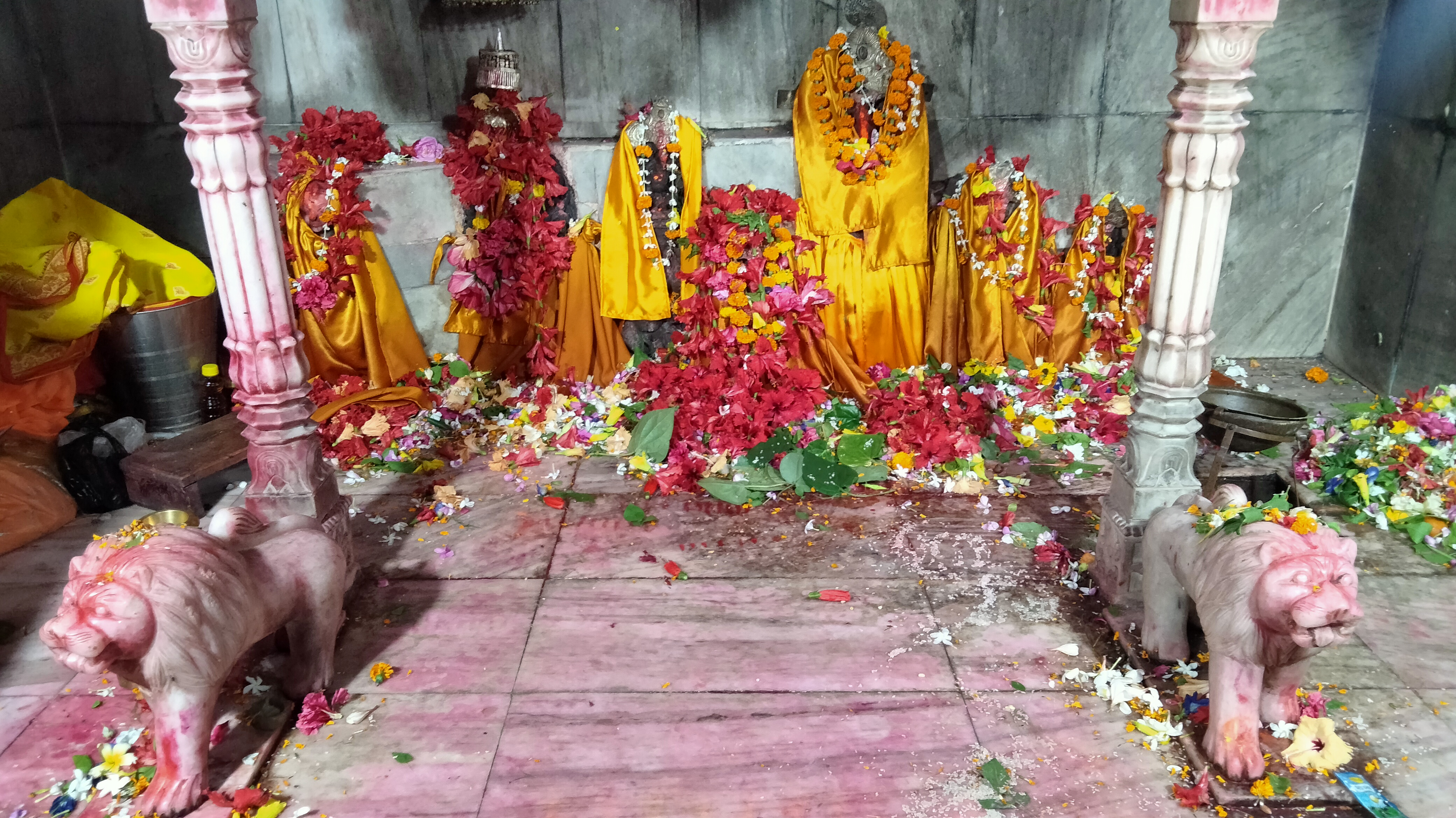
View of the Girija Devi Darbar inside the temple.

According to the legends of the epic Ramayana, Girija Devi was the kuldevi of the King Janaka in Mithila. In the Ramayana, the princess Sita of Mithila used to worship the goddess Girija Devi at the royal garden Baag Taraag Pushpavatika in the Phulhar village of the Mithila Kingdom.

== History ==
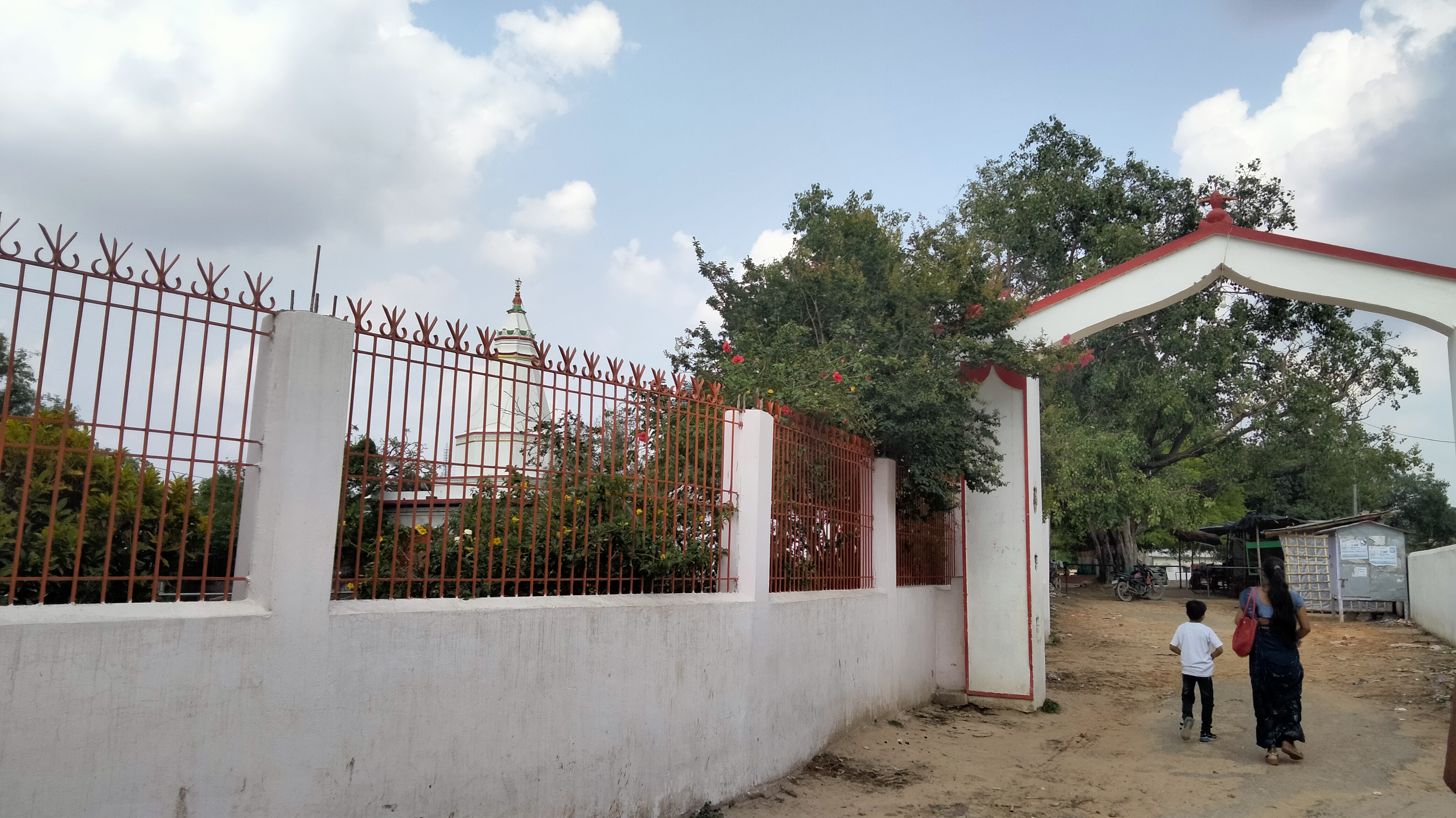
View of the campus of the temple.

The temple of Girija Devi might have been several times constructed at different time period. The earlier older temple was damaged in the earthquake of 1934 in the region. Later, a new temple was built on the site, which is the present structure of the temple. It was developed by the Guru Paramahansa with the help of devotees.

== Description ==
In the premises of the Girija Sthan, there are two ponds in the east and south sides.

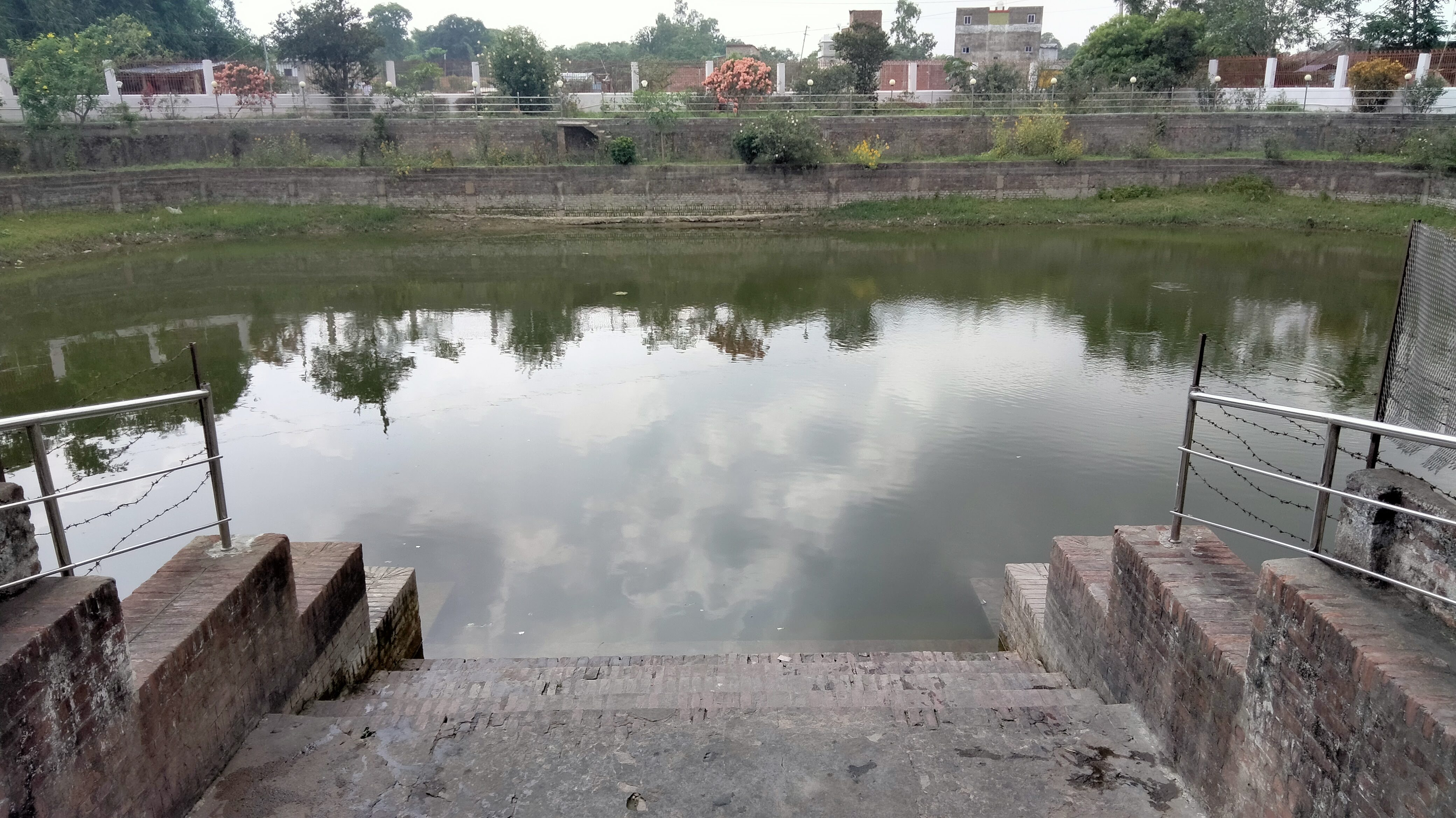
View of the eastern side pond.

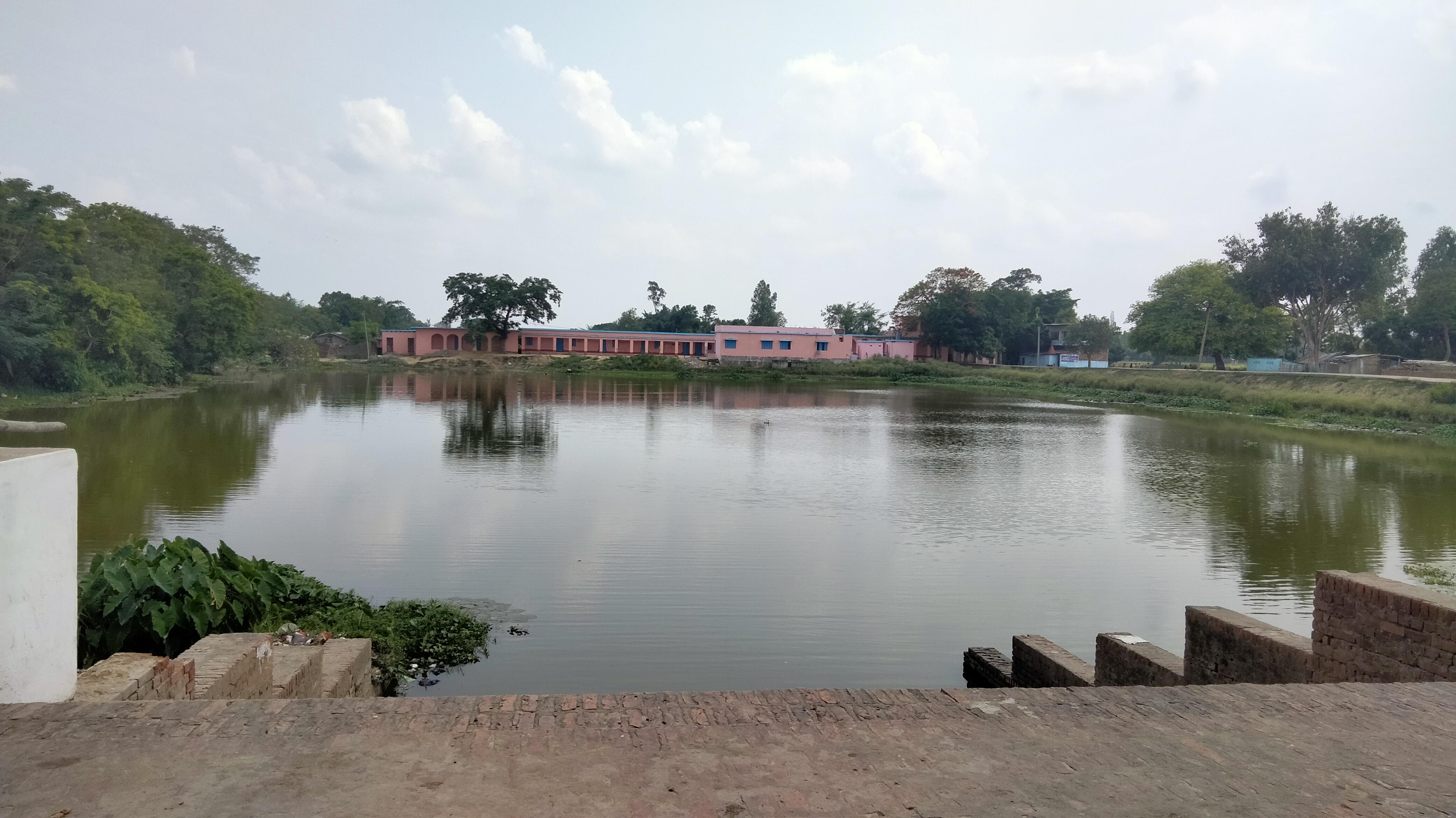
The pond in the south side of the premises.
