= Rama's Journey in Mithila =

Legendary journey of Rama in Mithila

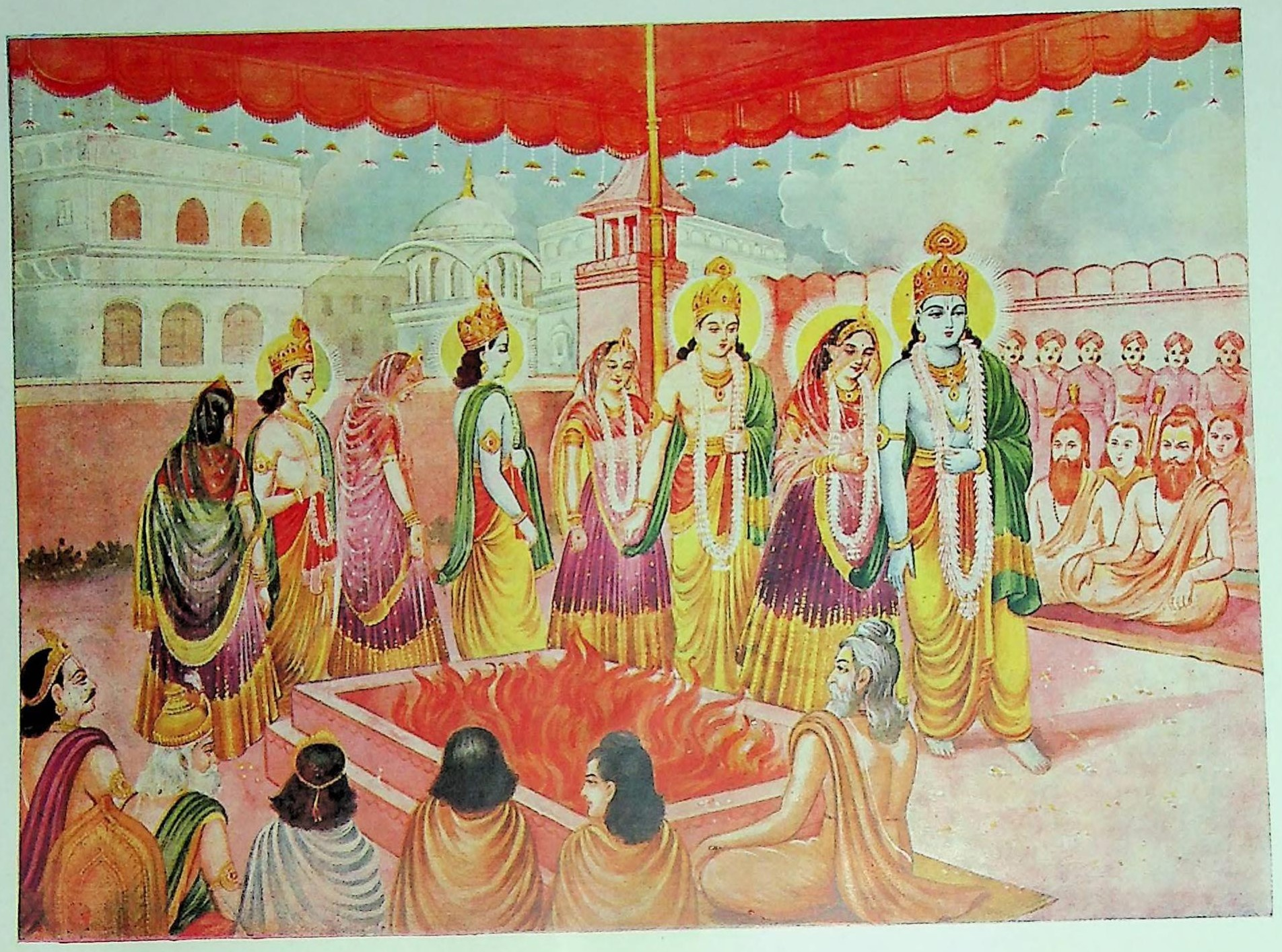
- Marriage of Rama and his brothers in Mithila

Creature information
- Folklore: Legendary Ramayana

Origin
- Country: India and Nepal
- Region: Mithila region
- Details: Sacred places in the journey of Rama in Mithila

Rama's Journey in Mithila is the part of Ramayana from the Vishwamitra Ashram at Buxar to the Kingdom of Mithila.

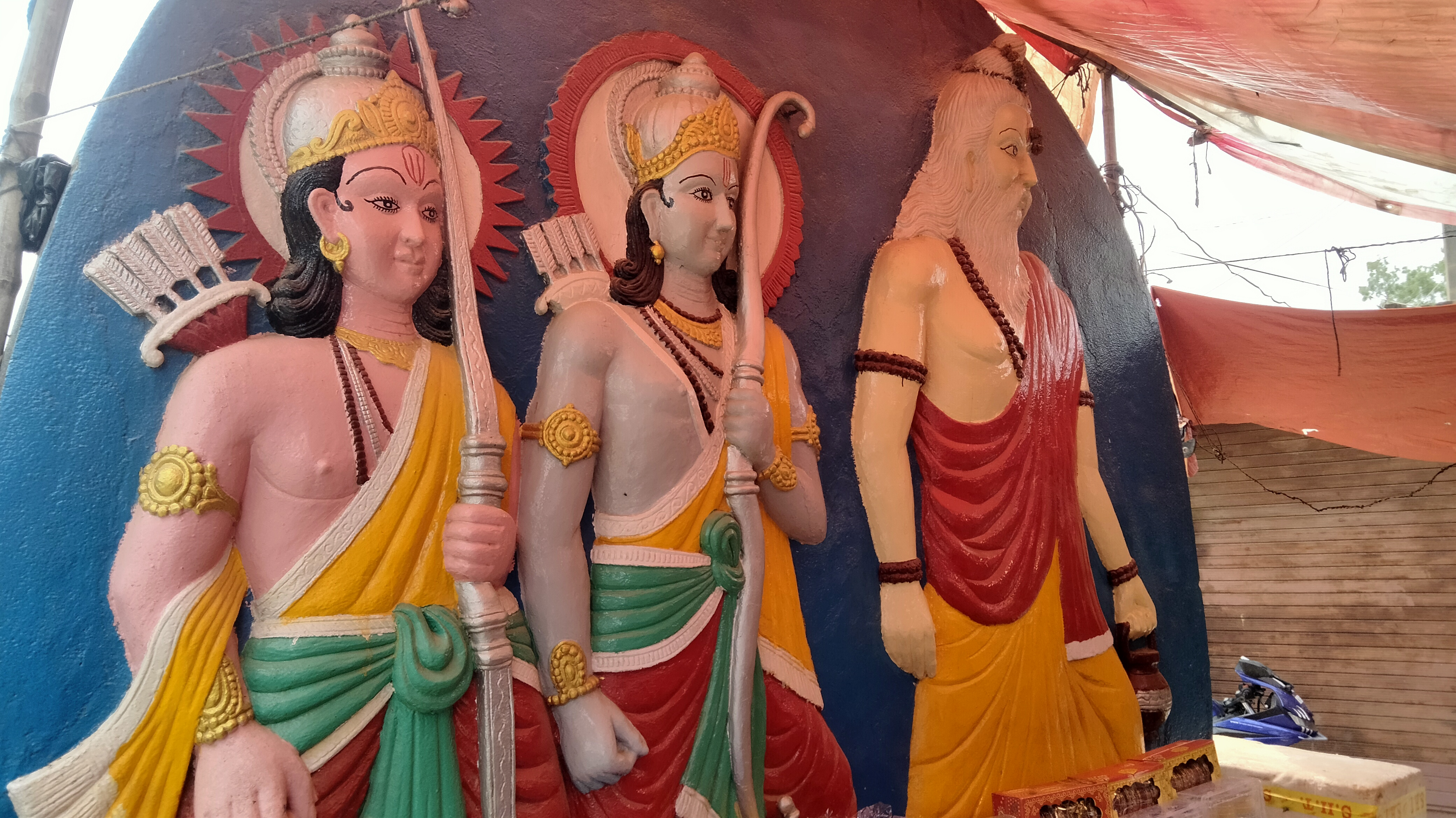
Statue at Uchchaith Sthan depicting Lord Rama's Journey in Mithila along with Guru Vishwamitra and brother Lakshmana

== Background ==
It is said that when Rama completed his Vedic education from the Guru Vashishtha, he came to the royal palace at Ayodhya. After some time, sage Vishwamitra came to the palace and demanded the princes Rama and Lakshmana with King Dasharatha for the protection of the Yajna at his ashram. After that princes Rama and Lakshmana were sent with the Guru Vishwamitra to his ashram.

Rama and Lakshman came to Vishwamitra Siddhashram to protect the Yajna of the sages. There, he killed many demons like Tadaka and Subahu during the Yajna. According to historians, Rama was not only brought to protect the Yajna, but they were also taught many lessons in weapons besides the Vedas in the gurukula of Maharishi Vishvamitra. It is said that after the completion of Yajnas at the Ashram, Vishwamitra was invited by King Shreedhwaja Janaka of the Mithila Kingdom to participate in Sita Swayamvar in his court. After that, Vishwamitra, with his disciples Rama and Lakshmana, went on a journey to the Mithila Kingdom.

== Journey in Mithila ==
=== Ramchaura Mandir, Hajipur ===
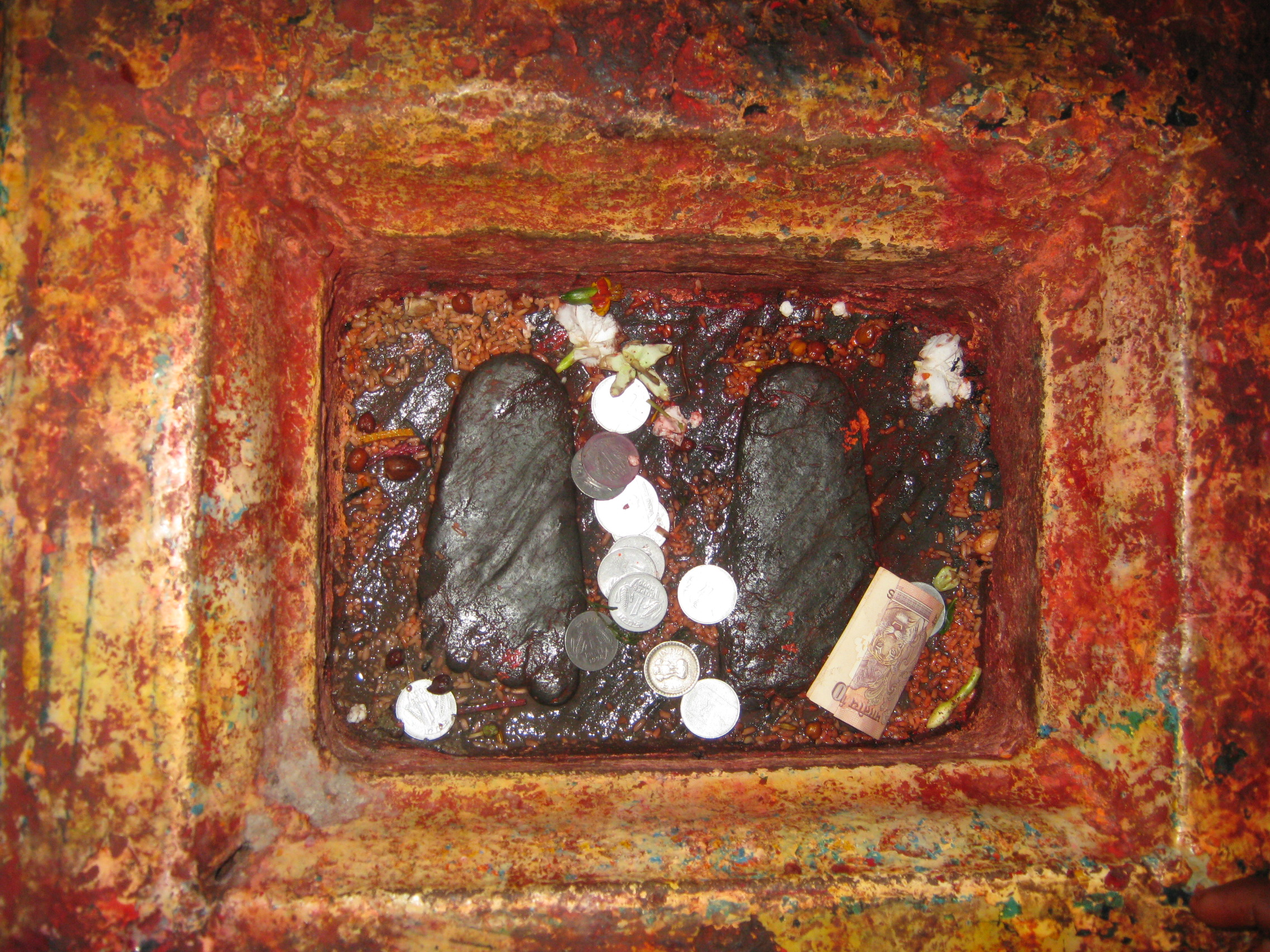
Feet of Rama (Ram Charan) at Ramchaura Mandir, Hajipur in the Mithila region.

According to legend, after crossing the Ganges by boat, they first came to Ramchaura Mandir in Vaishali while going to Janakpur for Sita Swayamvar. This place is located in Hajipur in Vaishali district of the Mithila region in the present state of Bihar. It is said that they were welcomed here by King Sumati of Vishala Nagari. It is believed that Rama, Lakshman and Vishvamitra rested here at a mound on the bank of the Ganga river for one night. This place is now known as Ramchaura.

=== Baraila Jheel ===
According to the legend of the legendary lake Baraila Jheel in the region of the Jandaha-Patepur blocks in the Vaishali district, Lord Rama along with his teacher Vishwamitra and brother Lord Lakshmana, took a short rest at the bank of the legendary lake during their journey to the city of Janakpur in Mithila.

=== Gautam Ashram, Kamtaul ===
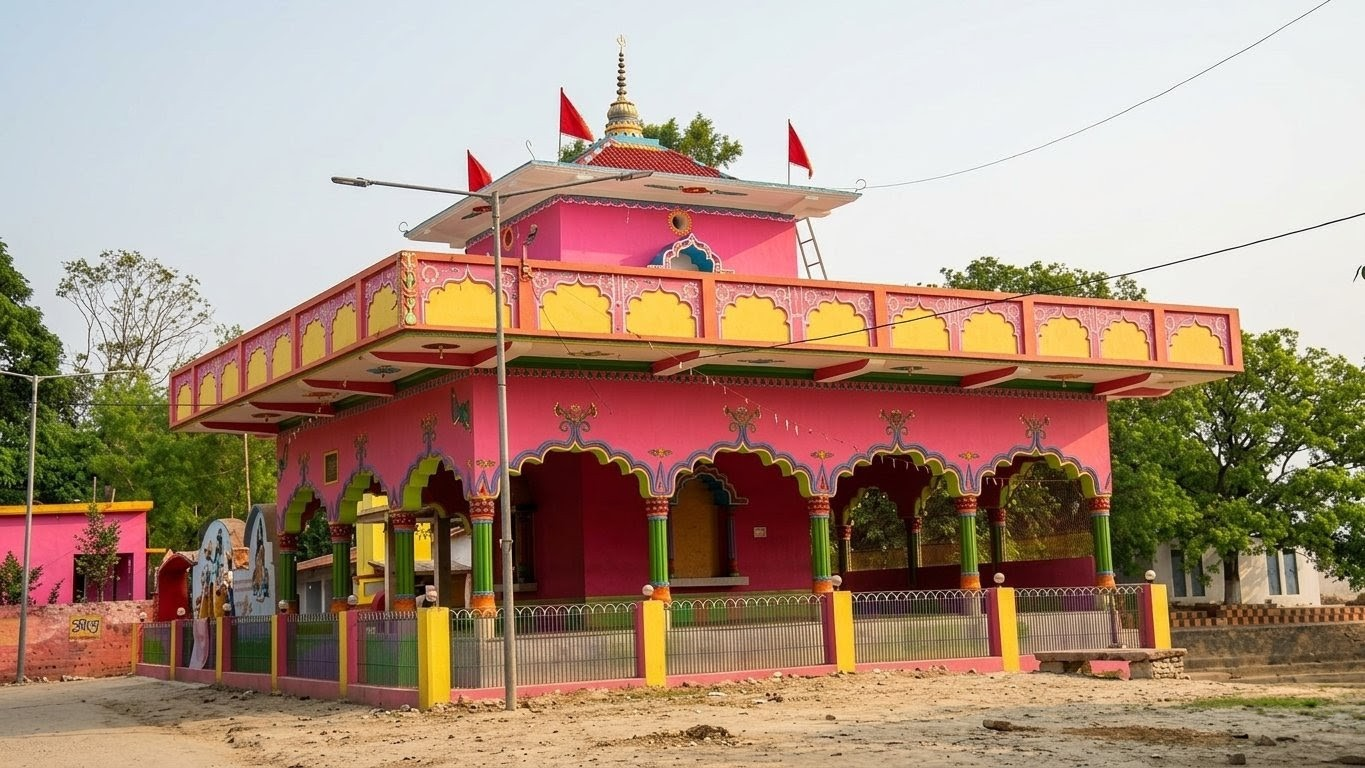
Ahalya Sthan Mandir, Gautam Ashram

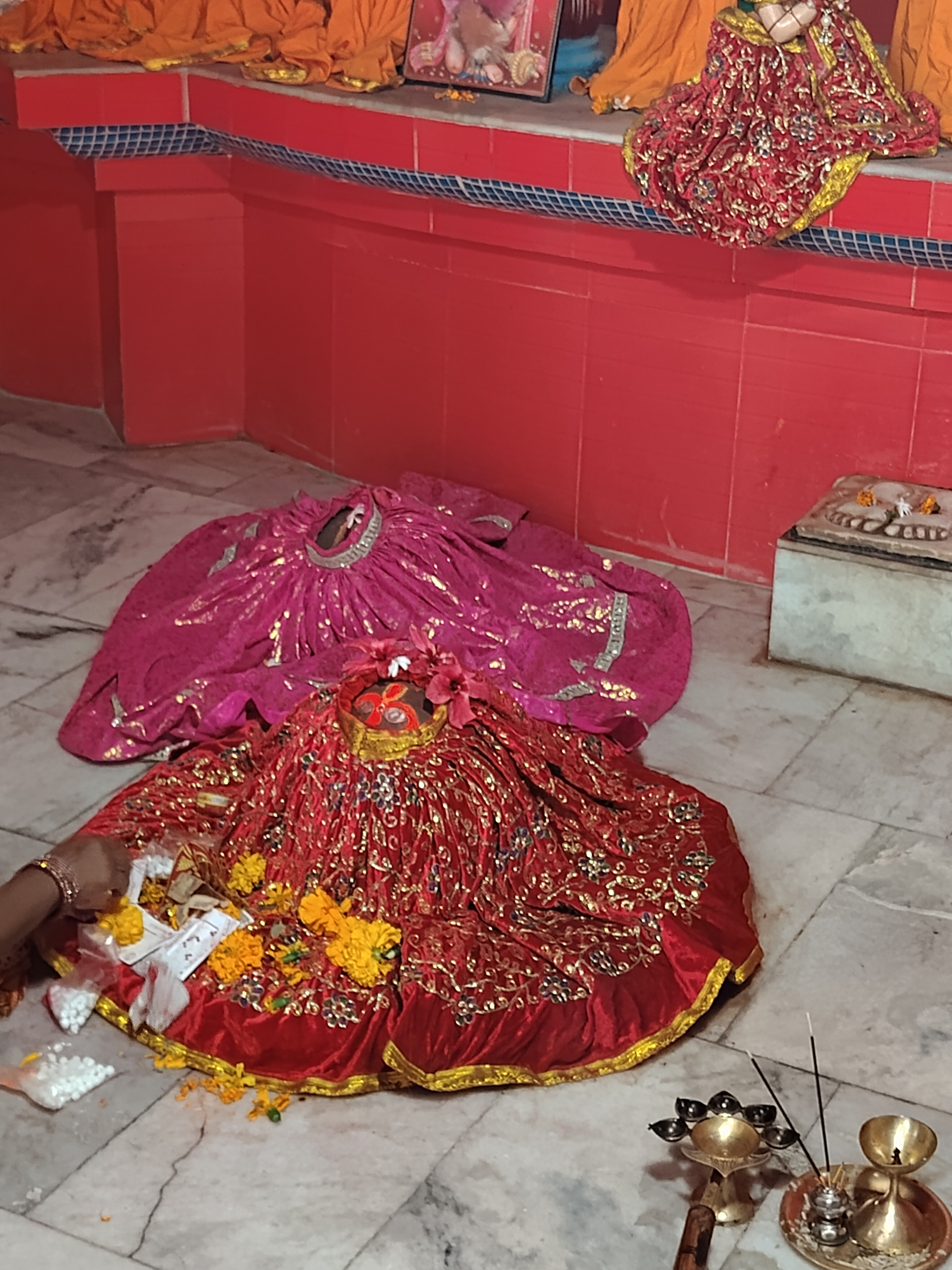
Devi Ahalya in Her Cursed Stone Form

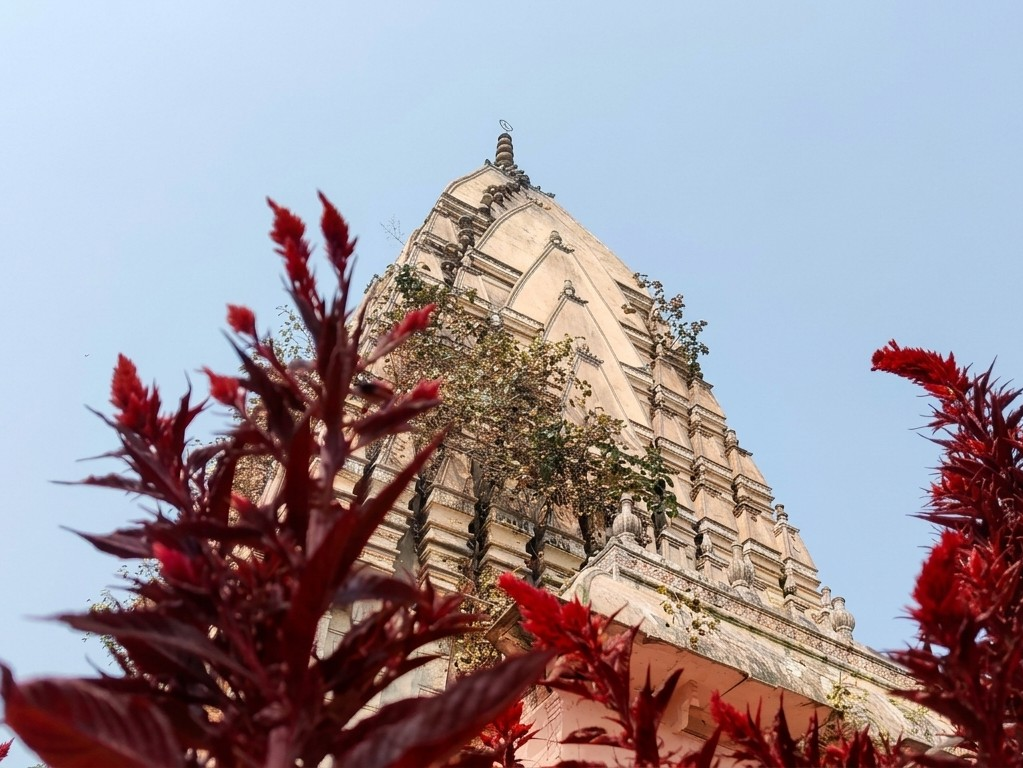
Bharat's First Shree Ram Janaki Mandir, Ahalya Sthan Campus, Gautam Ashram

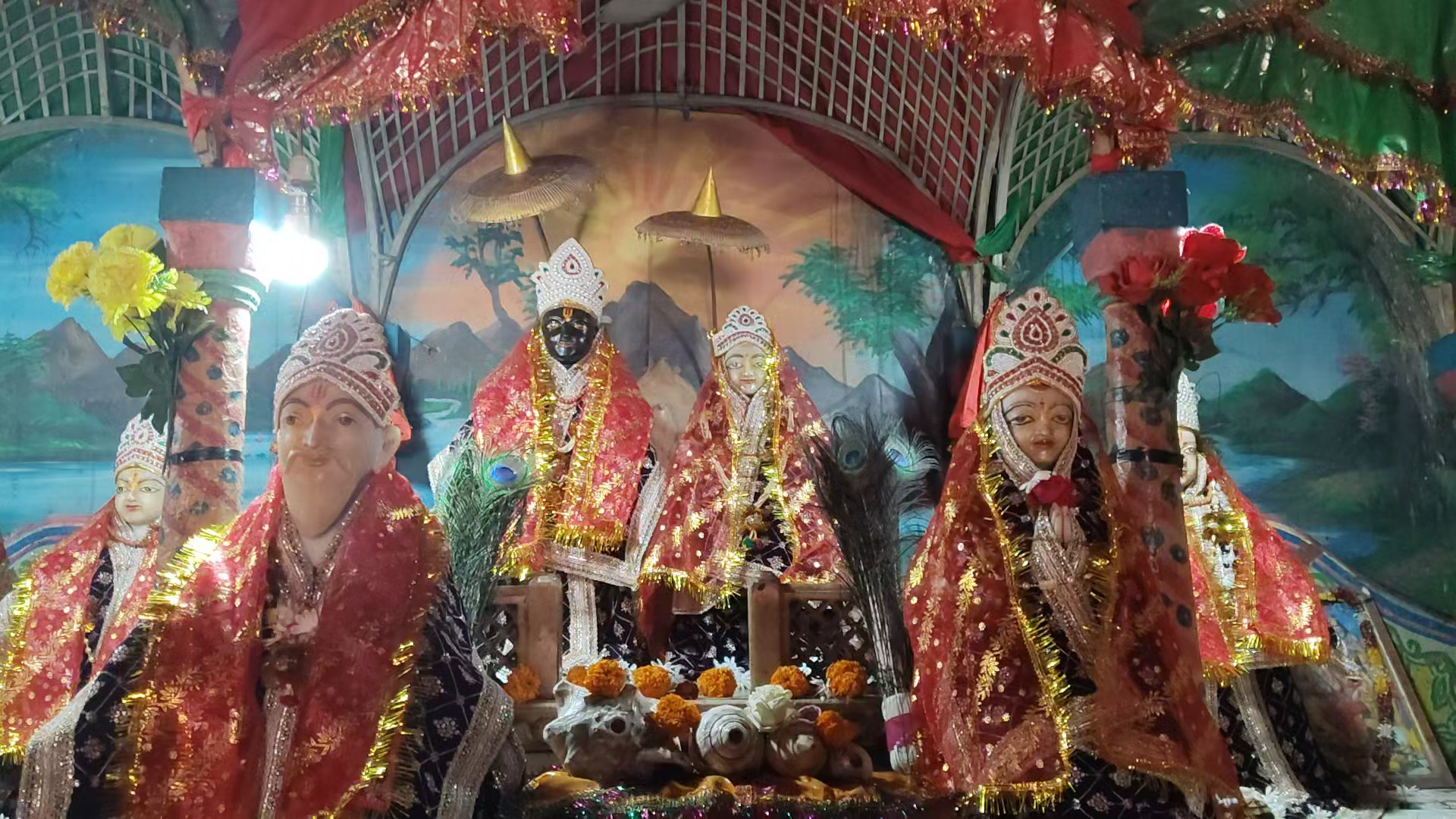
Inside Bharat's First Shree Ram Janki Mandir

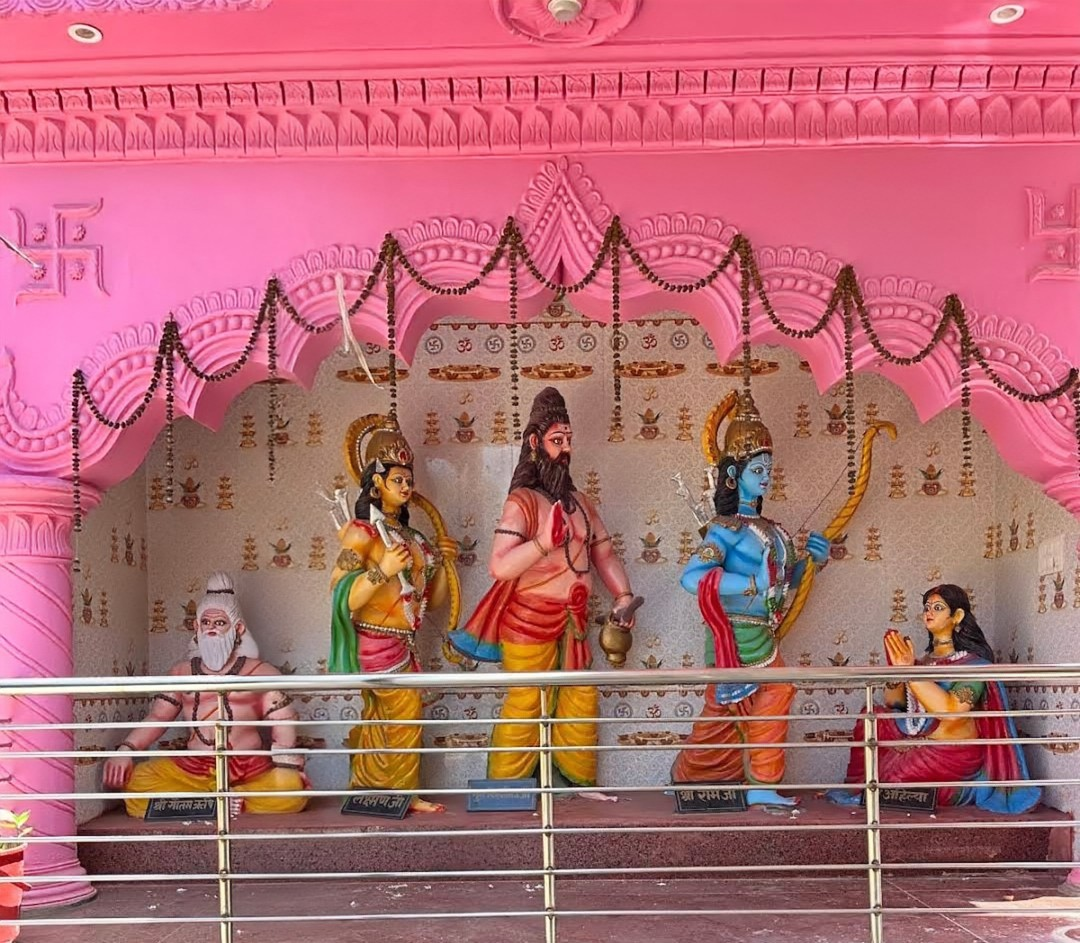
Statue of Devi Ahalya, Shree Ram, Shree Laxman, Maharshi Gautam, Maharshi Vishwamitra

Then they traveled towards Gautam Ashram at Kamtaul City(Ward 11) in the Mithila region of the present Darbhanga district of Bihar. When they reached Gautam Ashram, Rama became curious to know the deserted situation of the ashram so he asked his teacher about its history. Then Guru Vishwamitra narrated the story of the curse of Ahalya and the history of Ahalya sthan at the Ashram. It is said that Rama freed Ahalya from her curse there.

=== Amravati River ===
According to the legend of a dead and sacred mythological river Amravati, when Prince Rama was going towards Janakpur to participate in the Sita Swayamvara, he took a sacred bath in the river of Amravati at the Sarisav Pahi village formerly known as Siddharth Kshetra also called as Sarso in the region of the Mithila Kingdom and after that he started his further journey towards Janakpur. The village of Sarisab Pahi is located in the Pandaul block of the Madhubani district in the present state of Bihar in India.

=== Vishwamitra Ashram, Bisaul ===
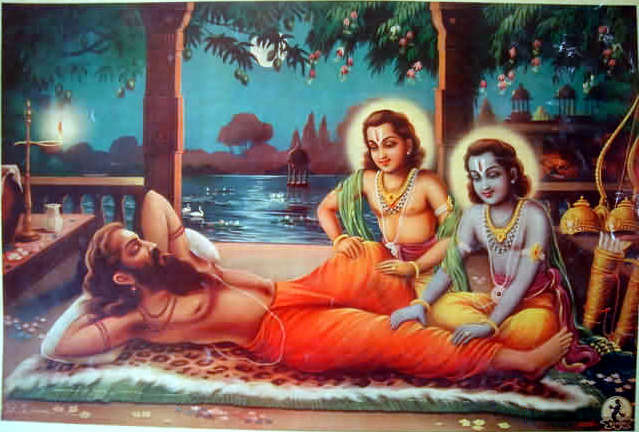
Disciples Rama and Lakshmana performing Guru-Seva

After that they went to Bisaul village near the city Janakpur of Mithila. It is said that in Bisaul village there was a royal mango garden, where King Janaka built an ashram for the residence of the sage Vishwamitra in Mithila. This place is called as Vishwamitra Ashram, Bisaul. Rama and Lakshmana with his teacher Vishwamitra stayed here.

=== Phulhar ===
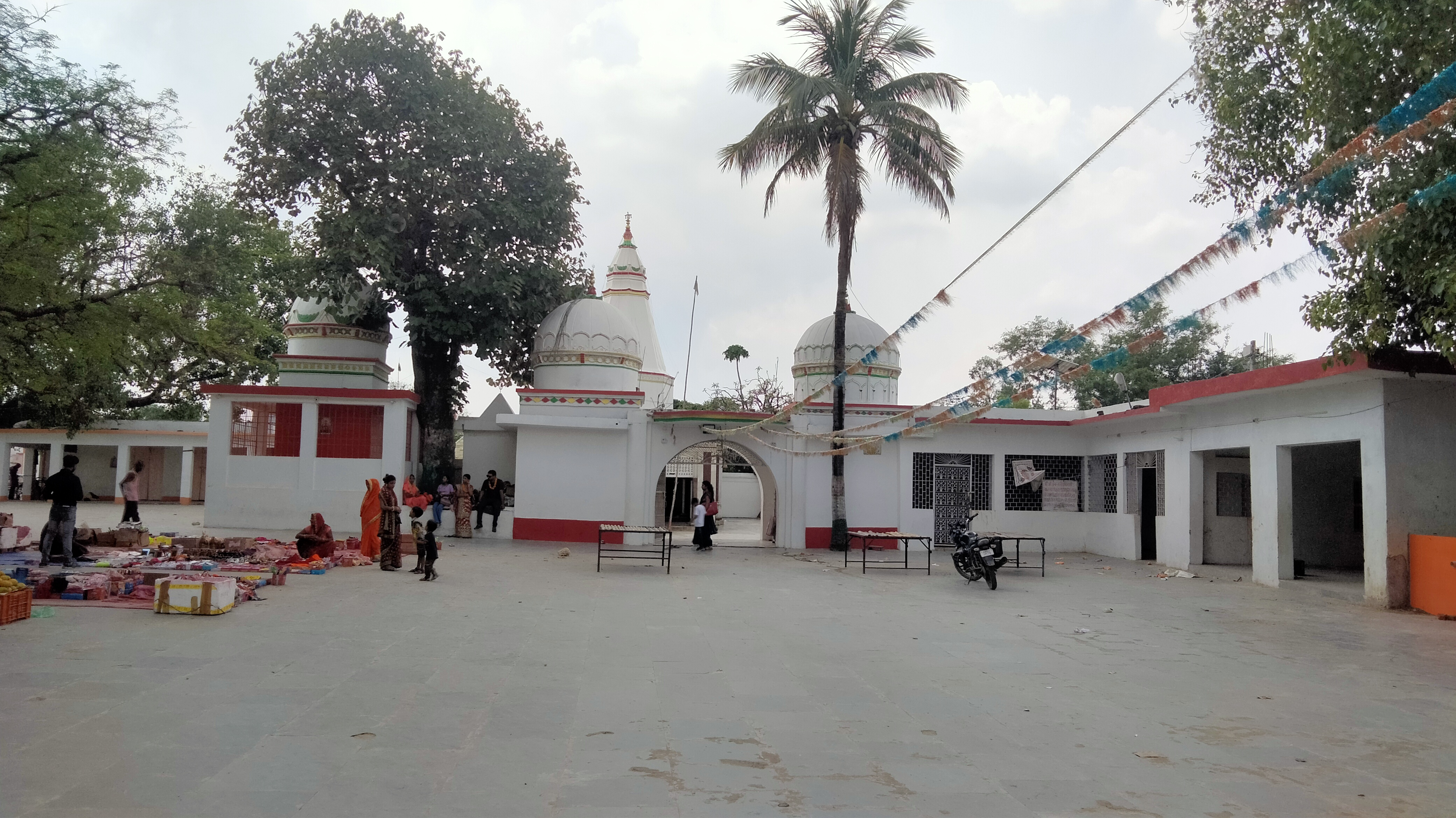
Girija Sthan Dham at Phulhar

Nearby the ashram, there was a royal flower garden known as Baag Taraag Pushpavatika in Phulhar, where Rama and Lakshmana went to pick up some flowers for their teacher to worship. Nearby the garden, there is the Girija Devi temple, where princess Sita used to worship the goddess Girija Devi. It is believed that the first meeting of Rama and Sita took place in this garden while flowers were being picked there.

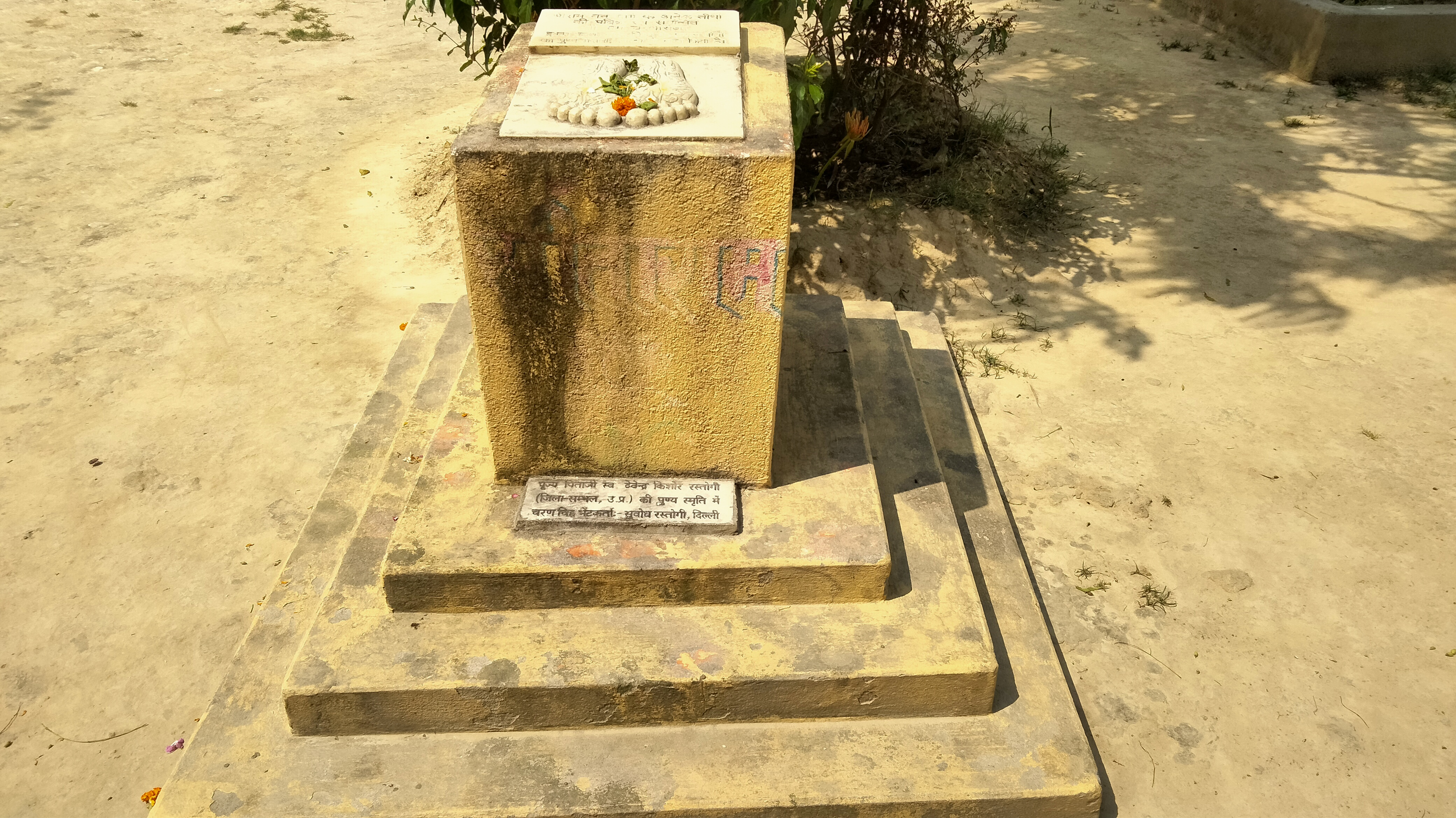
Iconic symbol of Shree Ramcharan at Bagh Tarag Pushpavatika

=== Janakpur (Capital of Mithila) ===
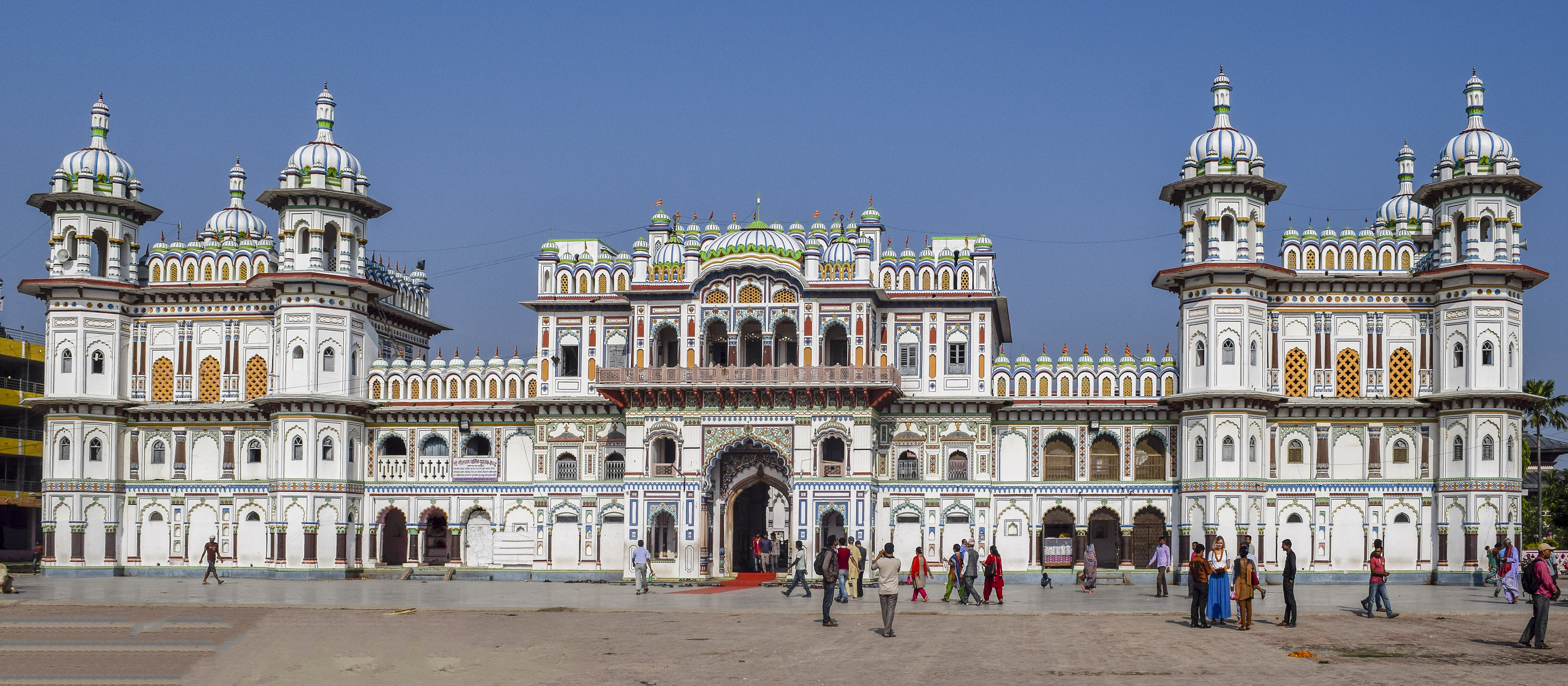
Janaki Mandir at Janakpur, the capital of Ancient Mithila Kingdom

After resting at Bisual, Rama and Lakshmana with their teacher Vishwamitra went to court of King Janaka at Janakpur where Swayamvar Sabha for the purpose of marriage of princess Sita was organised. In the competition of Swayamvar ceremony prince Rama was declared as the winner.

=== Manimandapa ===
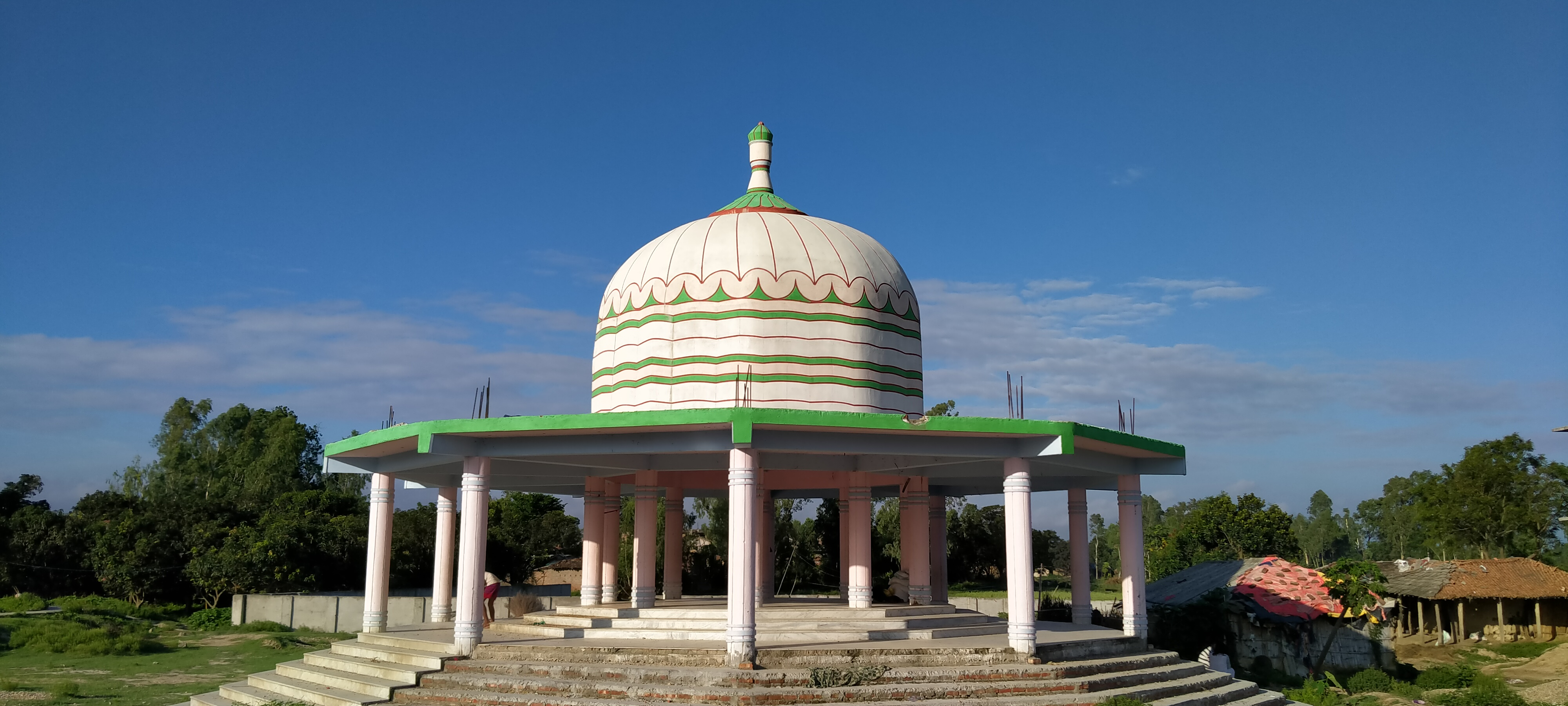
Vedi of Manimandap believed as the place of marriage of Prince Rama of Ayodhya and Princess Sita of Mithila

According to legend, in Mithila, after winning Swayamvar Sabha at the court of Janaka, Rama, along with his other three brothers, were married at Manimandapa. After the prince Rama broke the bow at the court of Janaka, the procession for marriage came from Ayodhya. The place where the altar and sacrificial pavilion (Yajna Mandap) decorated with gems was built for the marriage in Janakpur is near Rani Bazar known Manimandapa. In the campus of the shrine there is a pond where the feet of the four brothers were washed at the time of the marriage.

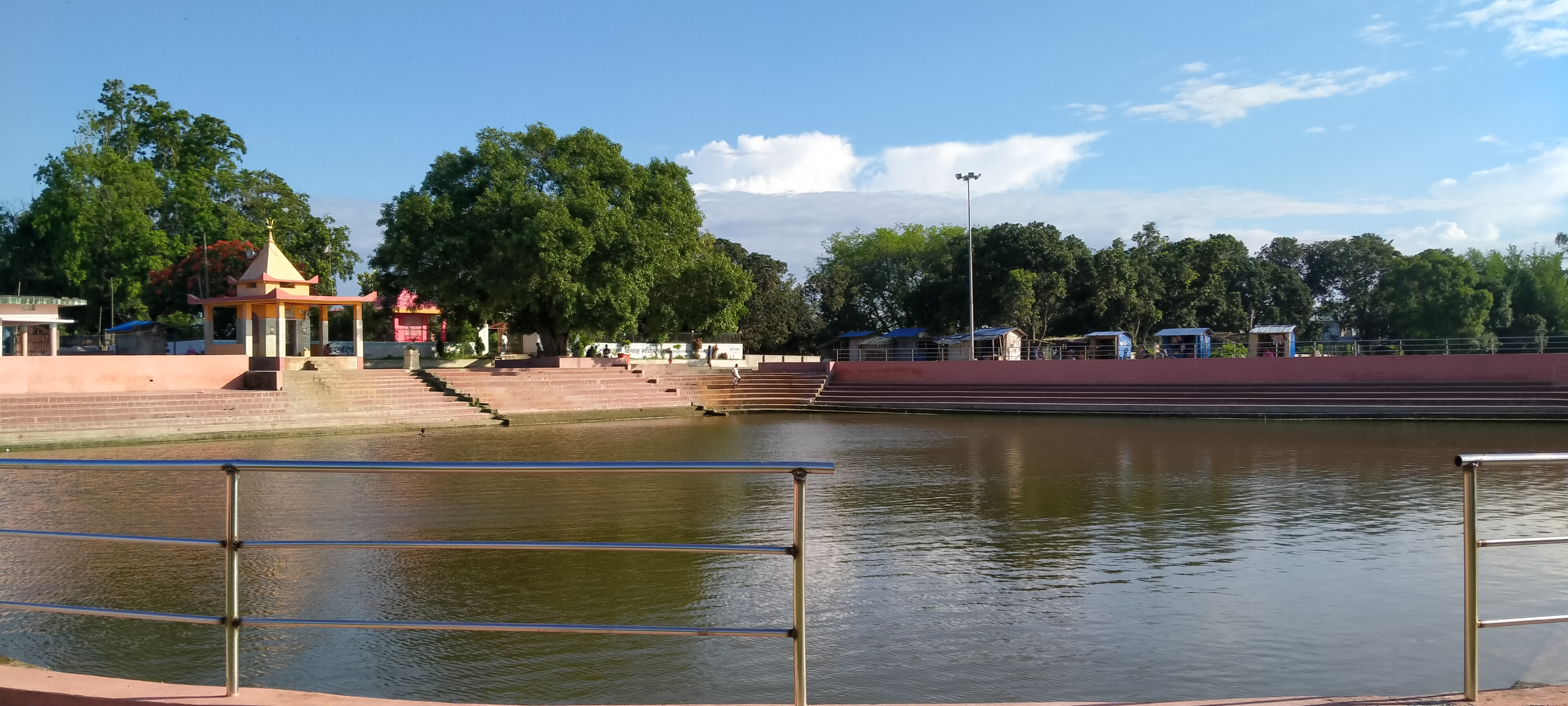
Pond in front of Manimandap
