= Amravati River =

Legendary ancient river in Mithila

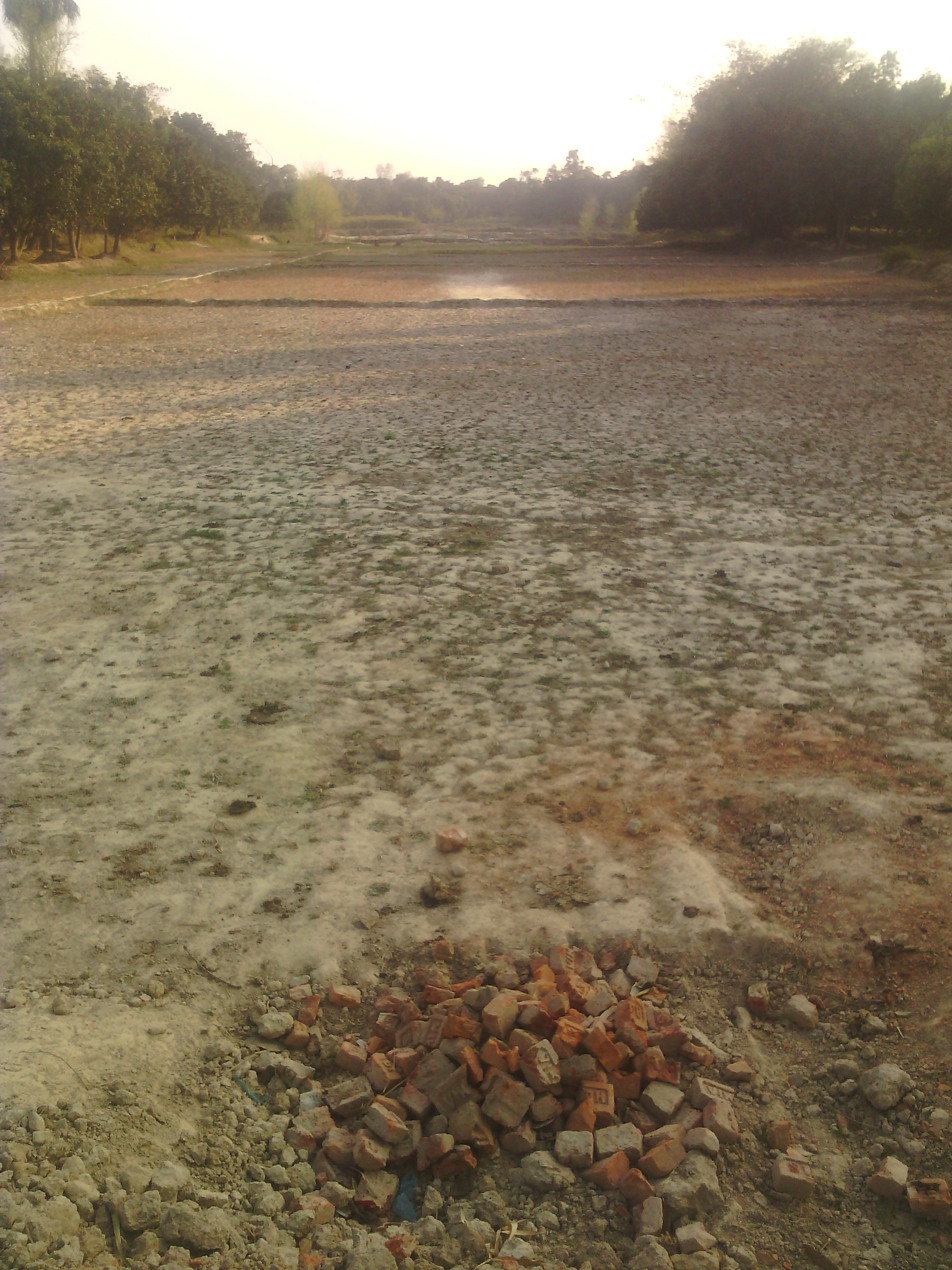
The remains of the path of the legendary river Amravati at Sarisab Pahi village in Madhubani district of the Mithila region in Bihar.

Amravati river (Maithili: अमरावती नदी) is a legendary former river in the Mithila region of the Indian subcontinent. In the ancient period, it was flowing through the village of Sarisab Pahi. The archaeologists involved in the exploration of the river have estimated it to be more than 4000 years old. According to legend, the river existed in Ramayana during the journey of Lord Rama in Mithila. During the period of King Nanyadeva of Karnat Dynasty in Mithila, a city named Amravati was also established near the bank of the river. In the early times, many rivers flowing in the Mithila region either dried up or merged over time. The Amravati river is one which dried up over a time in the early days. Presently in the Isapur village of the Madhubani district, the remains of the path of flow of the legendary Amravati river still exists. It is believed to be the origin place of the Amravati river. According to the archaeologists, the remains of ancient civilization have been found in the Isapur village.

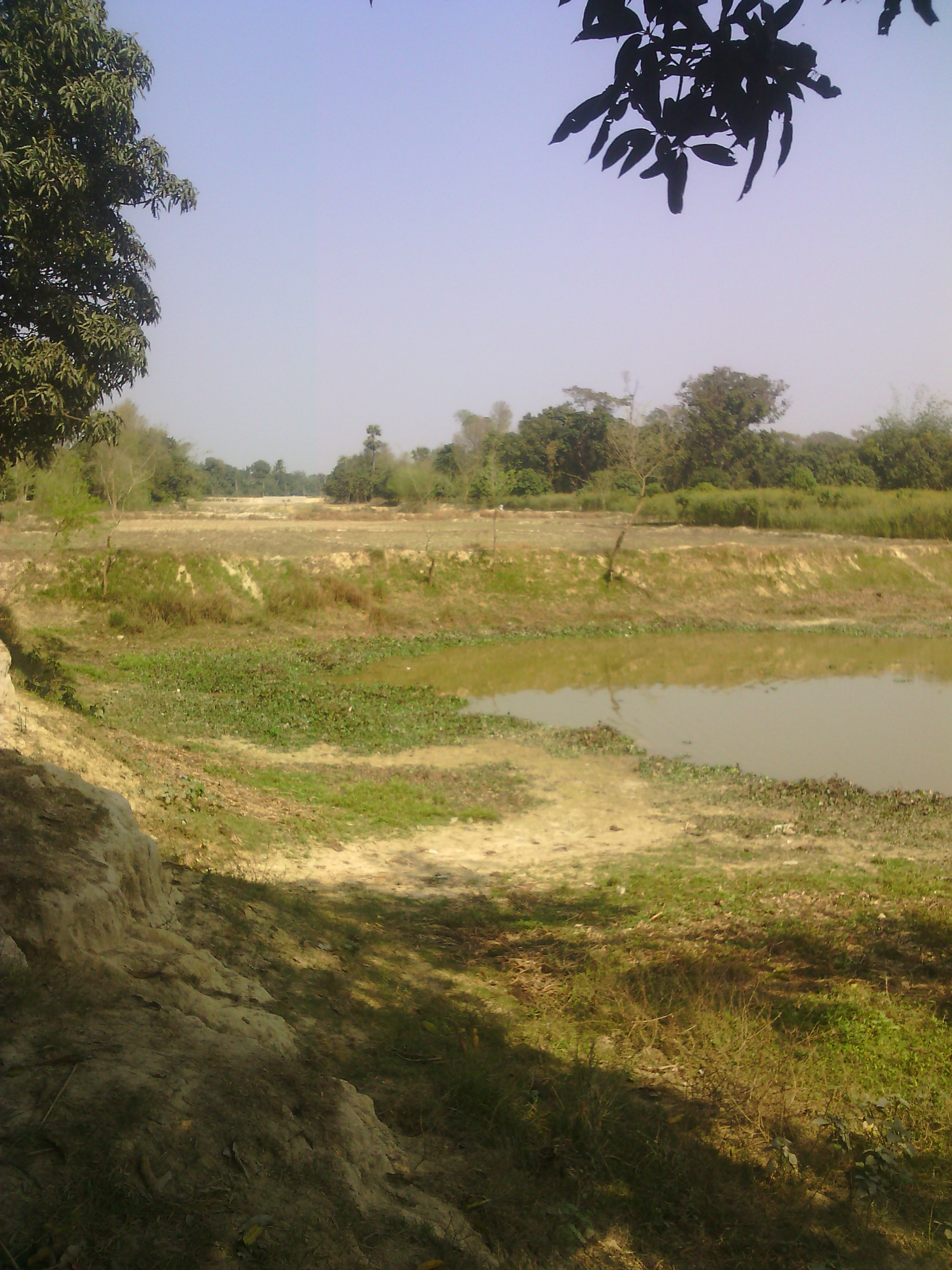
Flow path of the Amravati River

In the ancient times when the Amravati river was live and water was flowing in it, then Sarisab Pahi used to be a major trading center. The trading centre of Sarisab Pahi was called Hate Bazaar. Presently that place is known as Hati. On the eastern bank of the river there were two tols namely Thatheri Tol and Darji Tol. These two locations are presently situated in the western panchayat of the Sarisab Pahi village. There is a Hindu temple known as Siddheshwar Nath Mahadev Mandir on the bank of the river. It is said that the merchants used to worship here daily before starting their business.

== Legends ==
According to legend, the existence of the river Amravati is mentioned in Ramayana and different Puranas. It was a sacred river on the bank of which several sages and deities did worship and meditations. According to the Varaha Purana, during the migration of Balbhadra in Mithila, he stayed near the bank of this river. Balbhadra was the grandfather of Lord Krishna. He meditated and worshiped Goddess Siddheshwari Devi here. It is also mentioned in the Mithila Khanda of the text Skanda Purana. In the village of Sarisab Pahi near the dead river, there is still the temple of Goddess Siddheshwari Devi believed to be established by Balbhadra.

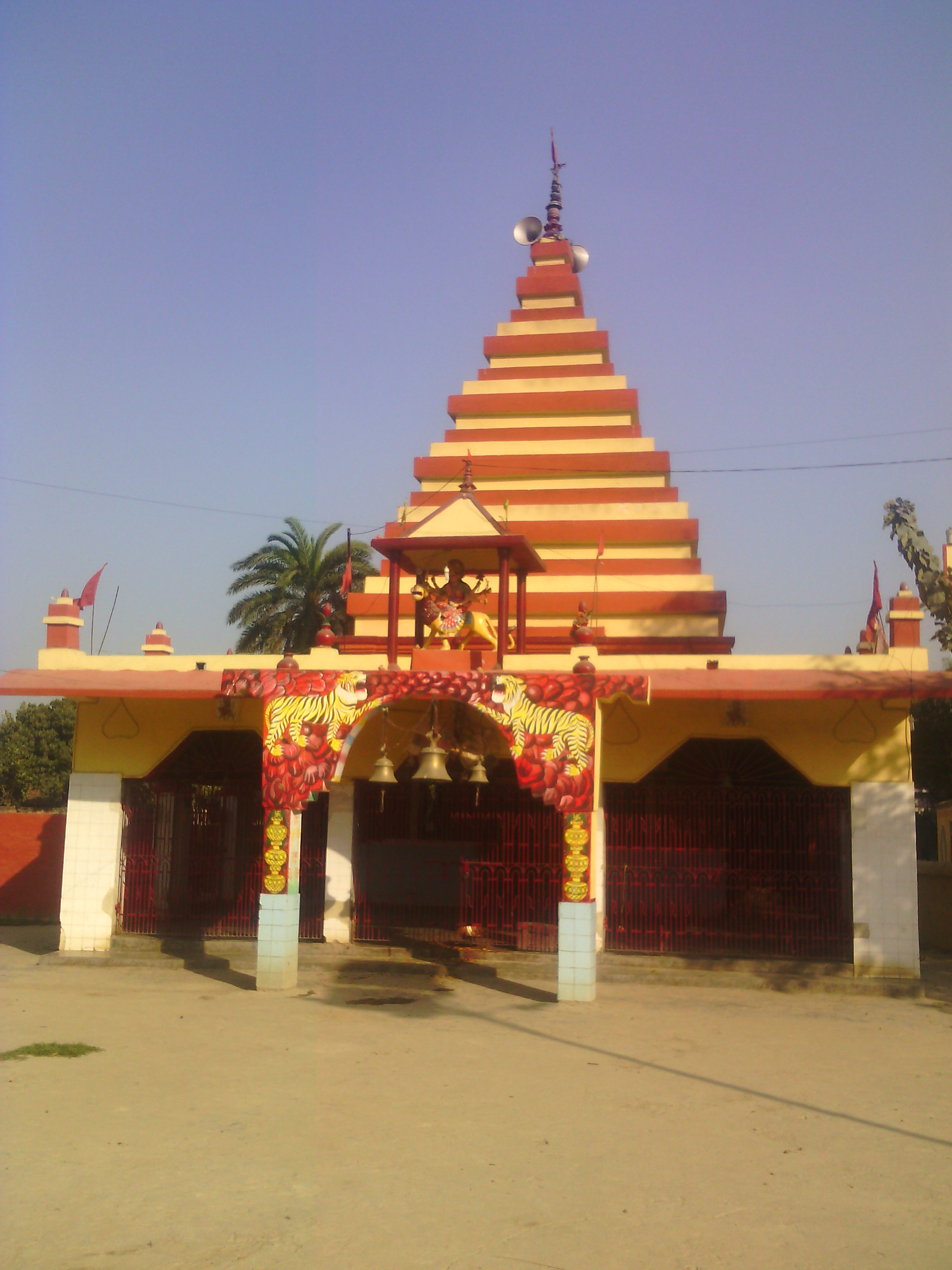
The present temple of Goddess Siddheshwari Devi at Sarisab Pahi

Similarly it is also said that when the Prince Rama of Ayodhya was going towards Janakpur to participate in the Sita Swayamvara, he took a bath in the river and after that he started his further journey towards Janakpur.

== History ==
During the period of King Ballal Sen of the Sen Dynasty in Bengal, some major parts of the Mithila region were annexed to his empire. Sarisab Pahi was then a prosperous city, so it would also be annexed into the empire. The Indian Gazette published in 1960 by Lasso Mela, mentioned Sarisab Pahi as a major trading centre. It is said that a special type of salt known as oos was abundantly found here. It was used for making items like gunpowder. Similarly, items made of Sikki and sound producing items were major items traded here. During the period of around 1320 A.D. to 1326 A.D, the trade in the city of Amravati was at its peak. In this period, some external invaders attacked the city. They looted Hate Bazar and destroyed the trading centre of the city. Many traders were killed and some ran away.

The remains of high mounds known as dih of the above-mentioned business centres situated on the banks of Amravati river still exist. These remains are situated along Isapur-Sankorth. Some archaeological remains items like pots, coins and bricks, etc. have been excavated from the dihas like Sato Dih, Manki Dih and the above-mentioned places and these are kept safely in the museum of Saurath.
