= Barela Bird Sanctuary =

Wildlife sanctuary in Bihar, India

- IUCN category IV (habitat/species management area)
- Location within Bihar Location within India
- Interactive map of Barela Bird Sanctuary
- Nearest city: Sonepur
- Coordinates: 25°45′58″N 85°34′50″E
- Area: 1.96 km^{2} (0.76 sq mi)
- Established: 28 January 1997

Baraila Lake Salim Ali-Jubba Sahni Bird Sanctuary, commonly referred to as Barela Bird Sanctuary, is a protected area and wildlife sanctuary located in Vaishali district of the Indian state of Bihar.

== Description ==
The sanctuary covers an area of 1.96 km^{2} (0.76 sq mi) and was declared as a protected area on 28 January 1997.

The sanctuary incorporates the Barela Lake and hosts about 106 species of local and 59 species of migratory birds. Major avifauna include Indian shag, red collared dove, Asian koel, green bee-eater, brahminy starling, Indian treepie, black ibis, ruddy shelduck, bar-headed goose, oriental magpie robin, and lesser whistling duck.
