= Lord Rama's Arrow, Pushpavatika =

Legendary weapon of Lord Rama

Bhagwan Ram Ka Teer
- भगवान राम के तीर (Maithili), Lord Rama's Arrow (English)
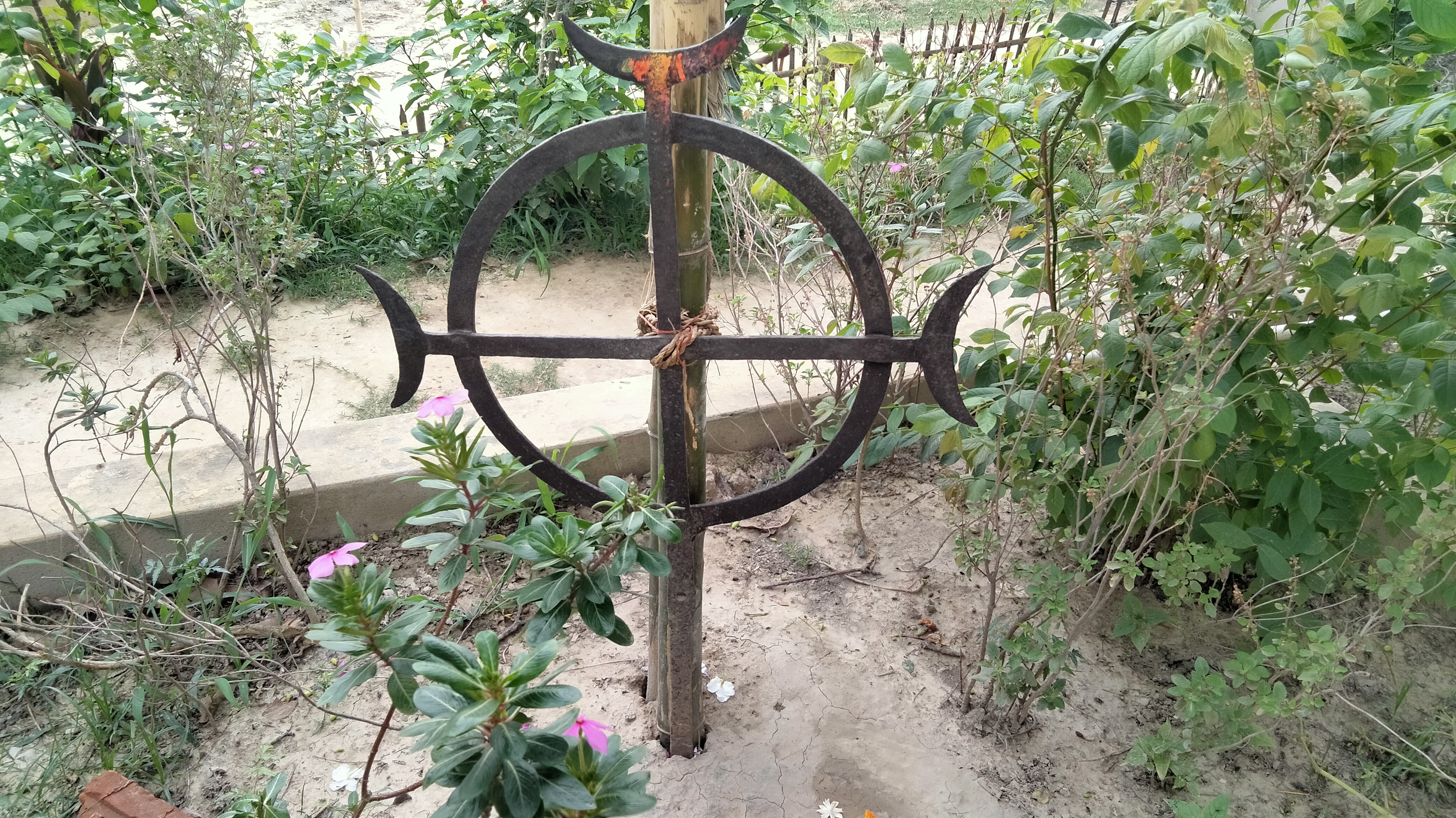
- Photo of the "Bhagwan Ram ka Teer"
- Subject: Divine bow or arrow of Lord Rama
- Location: Baag Taraag Pushpavatika, Phulhar

Lord Rama's Arrow ( Maithili: भगवान राम के तीर ) at the legendary garden Pushpavatika in the Phulhar village refers to the ancient metallic circular sculpture preserved at the premises of the garden. It is locally called as Bhagwan Ram ka Teer or Bhagwan Ram ka Teen Teer also Ram ka Baan. The legend considers it as a divine weapon of Lord Rama in Hinduism. It is said that this divine arrow has been hanging tied to a bamboo for four hundred years at the legendary garden. It was excavated during the period of the Raj Darbhanga in Mithila, from the legendary pond Baag Taraag at the Pushpavatika.

== Description ==
It is a metal chakra (circular shaped) with three chandrakar (crescent-shaped) arrows. The type of the metal is yet unclear. No attempt has been made to test it, nor has any initiative been taken in this direction, yet. But it is some special metal that despite being exposed to open air and water for centuries, it has neither rusted nor changed its color.

== History ==
Once around four hundred years ago, the legendary pond Baag Taraag at the Pushpavatika in Phulhar was excavated during the regime of Raj Darbhanga in Mithila. During the excavation, the metallic circular sculpture was found in the pond. It was called as Ram ka Teer that translates to "the arrow of Lord Rama". The local people urged, the Maharaja of the Raj Darbhanga to not take this legendary arrow at his palace. The Maharaja accepted their urge and left the arrow at the legendary site. Somehow the local people had asked for it from Darbhanga Maharaj.

After that on the occasion of Rama Navami, it was erected in the garden and tied with a bamboo in the open space of the legendary premises. The bamboo symbolises Lord Hanuman and holds a religious flag on it. The bamboo is changed every year on the occasion of the Rama Navami in the region. The tradition of changing the bamboo is still in practice.

== Legend ==
There is a legend of the divine arrow associated with the first meeting of Lord Rama and Goddess Sita at the royal garden Pushpavatika of the King Janaka in Mithila. According to the present Pandit Bihari Pandey of the Prabhu Shree Sitaramji Pratham Milan Mandir, when Lord Rama reached Janakpur to marry Goddesses Sita, then the Sakhiyon ( ladies friends ) of Goddess Sita asked to Lord Rama that if you are brave then give proof. They said, "Use your arrow to tell us the place where you first met Sita. If the arrow returns to you from that place, we will acknowledge your bravery.

It is said that Lord Rama accepted this condition to keep Sita's friends happy. After that, the ladies friends urged Goddess Sita to support her friends in winning the bet. They requested her to ensure that the arrow shot by Lord Rama did not return. The legend says "This is what happened". After that the acceptance of the bet, Lord Rama shot his divine arrow towards the Baag Taraag Pushpavatika. It is said that the arrow shot by Lord Rama did reach the Janaki Kund near the legendary garden, but due to some divine power of Goddess Sita, it did not return. The Hindu adherents in the region believe that the metallic circular sculpture excavated from the Baag Taraag pond is the same legendary divine arrow that was shot by Lord Rama in Ramayana.
