= Sankorth =

Historical village in Mithila

Sankorth Samkort
- Gram Panchayat
- Sankorthu
- Interactive map of Sankorth
- Country: India
- State: Bihar
- Region: Mithila
- District: Madhubani
- Block: Pandaul
- Named for: Samaveda Pradhan

Population (2011)
  - Total: 4,931
  - Males: 2,516
  - Females: 2,415
- Demonym: Maithil

Languages
  - Official: Mother tongue; Ancient: Hindi: Maithili; Sanskrit

Families
  - Number of households: 1030
- Postal Pincode: 847424
- Literate Person: 2272
- Illiterate Person: 2659

Sankorth is a historical village in the Mithila region of Bihar in India. It is situated in Pandaul block of the Madhubani district in Bihar. In ancient times, the dead river of Amravati was flowing through the village. The village has potential for archeological remains. A man from the village found an ancient coin, which is said to be worth lakhs of rupees. In ancient times, the village was a seat of the head of Samaveda called as Samaveda Pradhan in Mithila. It was a centre for Sanskrit and Vedic learning in Mithila. It was called as Samkort or Sankorthu. Presently, Sankorth has status of a gram panchayat in Bihar.

== Etymology ==
The name Sankorth of the village is derived from Samaveda, a major branch of the Indian text Vedas. In ancient times, the head acharya of the Samaveda branch called as Samaveda Pradhan was living in the village. Therefore, the village was called as Samkort or Sankorthu. Nowadays, it is known as Sankorth.

== Demographics ==
According to the Indian population census 2011, the total number of families residing in the village is 1030. The total population of the village is 4931. The number of males is 2516 and that of females is 2415.
