= Sarisav Pahi =

Village in Bihar, India

Sarisav Pahi Sarso
- Village
- Sarisab Pahi
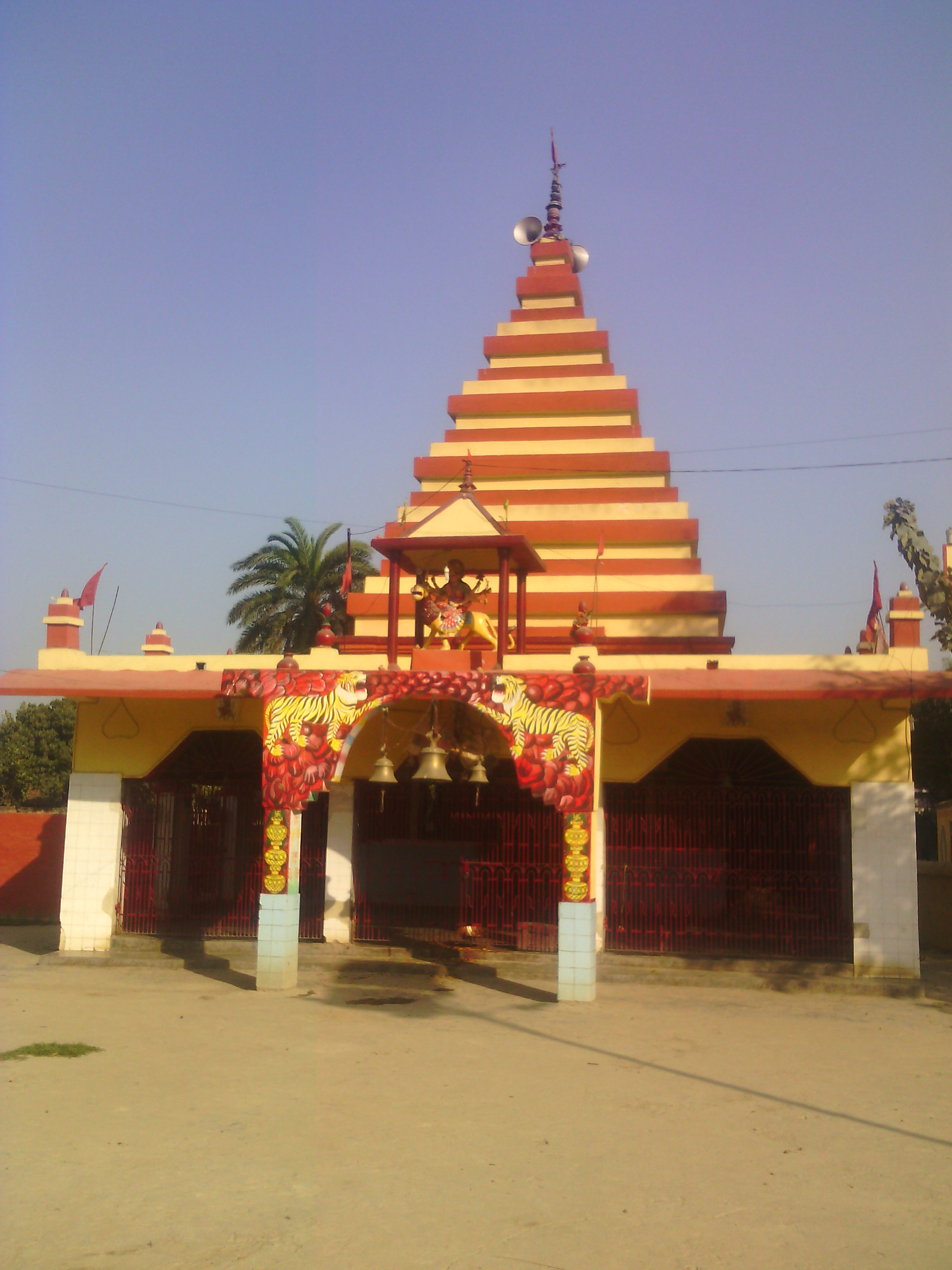
- Mata Siddheswari Mandir at Sarisab Pahi village
- Nickname: Amravati
- Interactive map of Sarisav Pahi
- Country: India
- State: Bihar
- Region: Mithila region
- District: Madhubani district
- Block: Pandual
- Named for: Sanskrit term - Gaur Sasharpa (Maithili term - Sarso, English translation - White Mustard) and Siddhartha Kshetra
- Gram Panchayat: Sarisav Pahi East and Sarisav Pahi West

Government
  - Type: Mukhiya
  - Body: Panchayat samiti

Population (2011)Population census of India
  - Total: 17,864
- Demonym: Maithil

Language
  - Official: Hindi

Additional language
  - Mother language: Ancient Language: Maithili; Sanskrit
- Time zone: IST Indian Standard Time
- PIN Code: 847424

Sarisav Pahi also called as Sarisab Pahi is a village in the Madhubani District of the Mithila region in Bihar, India. It is situated in the territory of the Madhubani Vidhan Sabha as well as Madhubani Lok sabha constituency. The local language is Maithili. The village is divided into two Gram Panchyats Sarisav Pahi East and Sarisav Pahi West.

== Etymology ==
In Sanskrit language, the meaning of "Sarisab" is "Gaur Sasharpa". The term "Gaur Sasharpa" translates as White Mustard. According to legend, it is said that the white mustard was majorly cultivated in this village. The synonyms of "Gaur Sasharpa" in Sanskrit is "Siddhartha". According to legend, in the ancient times, this village was called as "Siddhartha Kshetra".

== Description ==
Sarisab Pahi village was the educational centre in the Mithila region during the mediaeval period. It has an important place in the academic history of the world. It was a major location for the Vedic learning in Mithila. It has been the birthplace of the eminent scholars like Ayachi Mishra, Sankara Mishra, Amarnath Jha and Hetukar Jha, etc. According to the intellectual history of the Mithila region, the Indian philosophy flourished in this village during the mediaeval period. The Ayachi Mishra Dih of the village is an important location which witnesses the scholarly legacy of the village. As per mythology the first ranked educated Brahman family was located here. And after that family diversions some people moved to other places and started their working and residence. In the early times, Sarisab Pahi was the part of the lost city Amravati which was established by the Kings of Karnat Dynasty in Mithila. The city was named after the ancient river Amravati flowing through the village. It was a major commercial hub of the region. During the period of 11th -12th century CE, it was annexed in the empire of the King Ballala Sen of the Sen Dynasty in Bengal. Later during the period of 1320 -1326 CE, the trading centres of the city were looted and destroyed by outside invaders. Many traders of the city were killed and the remaining traders ran away from the region. Consequently, the reputation of the city as a commercial hub declined and gradually the city got lost over a time period. In the recent years, several ancient archaeological remains have been excavated from the different ancient sites of the village which are expressing the evidences of the ancient existence of the village. These sites are often called as dih.

The famous royal lady dancer Minakshi alias Manki belonged to this village. There is a dih called as Manki Dih which was her residence place in the village.

== Legends ==
According to legend, during the Mahabharata period, it was Siddharth Kshetra of the Mithila Kingdom, where Vedic scholars and sages came to learn Vedic studies and meditate on the God. Balbhadra, the grandfather of Lord Krishna, stayed here during his migration in the Mithila Kingdom. There he established a Devi temple known as Maa Siddheshwari Devi Mandir. Here he meditated on the Goddess Siddheshwari Devi.

In the Ramayana period, Lord Rama took a sacred bath in the legendary river Amravati near the village during his journey towards the kingdom of Mithila to participate in the Sita Swayamvara Shabha organised at the court of the King Janaka in the capital city Janakpur.

== Demographics ==
As per the population census 2011, the total population of the Sarso village is 17864. The separate populations of male and female are respectively 9034 and 8830. The total households number is 3843. The average number of members in a household or a family is 4.
