= Baraila Jheel =

Lake in the Mithila region

Coordinates: 25.765°N 85.554°E

Baraila Jheel (Maithili: बरैला झील) is a lake in the Mithila region of the Indian subcontinent. It is located in the region of Jandaha-Patepur blocks of the Vaishali district in the state of Bihar in India. It is spread over area of 479 acres. The Baraila lake has culture significance in the region, since it is also associated with the legend of the Rama's journey in Mithila. It also holds a bird sanctuary.

== Etymology ==
The etymology of the term Baraila is associated with the legend of Rama's journey in Mithila. According to the local legend, Lord Rama paused here during his journey to the city of Janakpur in Mithila. He was captivated by the natural beauty of the place. It is said that, welcoming him, the people exclaimed, "Var Aila"—meaning, "The Groom has arrived." The local believes that through linguistic evolution, the phrase Var Aila gradually transformed into term "Barela."
