= Ramchaura Mandir =

Hindu temple in India

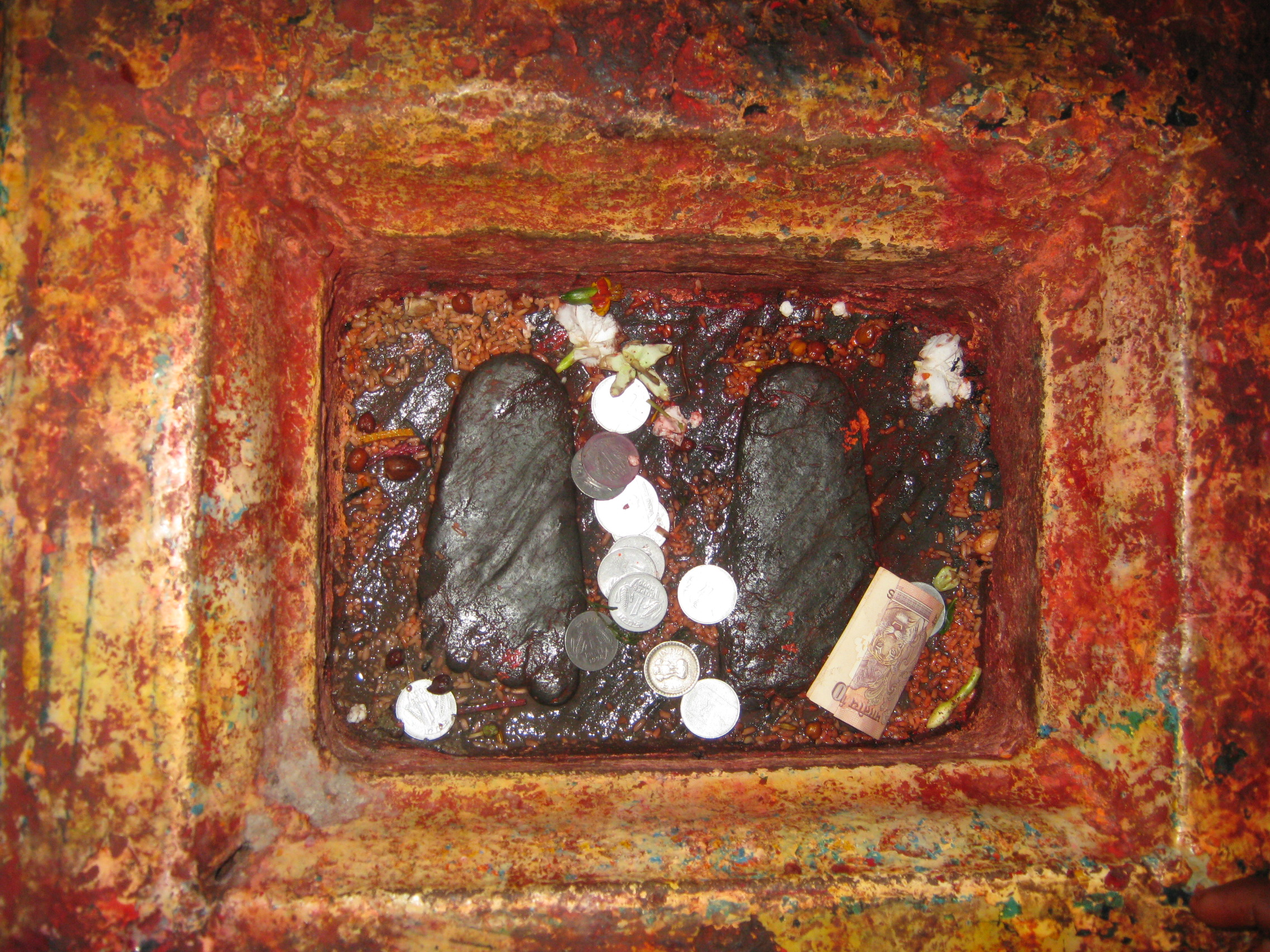

- Location in Bihar

Religion
- Affiliation: Hinduism
- Deity: Rama
- Festival: Rama Navami

Location
- Location: Rambhadra, Hajipur, Vaishali district
- State: Bihar
- Country: India
- Coordinates: 25°40′N 85°13′E

Architecture
- Type: Indian
- Sacred place related to the Rama's Journey in Mithila

The Ramchaura Mandir is a Hindu temple in the city of Hajipur, Bihar, India. Dedicated to the god Rama, it is located at Rambhadra near Helabazar.

According to local folklore, Rama is believed to have visited this place on his way to Janakpur; leaving his footprints here, which are worshiped as the central icon.

The Ramchaura Mandir celebrates Rama Navami, the birth anniversary of Rama. A small fair is also organised on the eve of Rama Navami.

Archeological objects excavated from Ramchaura are kept at the Patna Museum. Proposed Historical Text for Ramchaura Mandir / Bari Sangat MathMonastic Lineage and AdministrationThe Ramchaura Mandir operates under a traditional Sangat and monastic math system (Bari Sangat), which has held spiritual custody over the holy site and Lord Rama's footprints for centuries. The institution is governed by a long-standing, lineage-based Guru-Chela (teacher-disciple) succession that spans more than 20 generations.The traditional rights, property management, and daily religious rituals of the math are overseen by the residing Mahant. Notable spiritual heads in the recent unbroken line of succession include:Mahant Raghubar DasMahant Narayan Das (successor to Mahant Raghubar Das)Mahant Ramsumiran Das (the current serving Mahant and chief custodian)Under their hereditary administration, the math has successfully preserved the extensive temple properties, maintained religious traditions, and managed major regional cultural events, most notably the annual Rama Navami celebrations.

== Etymology ==
Chaura is a Bhojpuri language word which means orchid.

== Significance ==
According to local legend, the god Rama had got his Mundan (first haircut ceremony) done here.

The footprints of Rama are worshipped here. This footprint is at the altitude of 45 m from ground.

"Bari Sangat" and "Chhoti Sangat" is also situated near the temple. During ancient period many Saints, Mahatmas and Yogi used to visit these "Sangats" and offered prayer.

== Festival ==
Rama Navami, celebrating the birth of Rama, is the chief temple festival. The festival is celebrated annually in the ninth day of the Hindu month of Chaitra (March–April). A popular fair is also organised here on Rama Navami.

Bael is taken as prasad on the eve of Rama Navami.

== Gallery (Ramchaura Mandir - Hajipur) ==
Footage marks of God Shree Ram known as Shree Rama Charanaravind.

Ramchaura Mandir View.

Ramchaura Mandir (Closeview)

Ramchaura Mandir Entrance(old)

== See also ==
- List of Hindu temples in India
- Hajipur
