= Hetukar Jha =

Indian author, professor, researcher, and Fulbright Scholar

- Born: 5 March 1944; Madhubani district, Bihar
- Died: 19 August 2017 (aged 73); Patna, Bihar
- Occupations: author, professor, researcher

Hetukar Jha (5 March 1944 – 19 August 2017) was an Indian author, professor, researcher, and Fulbright Scholar. He was an honorary managing trustee of the Maharajadhiraja Kameshwar Singh Kalyani Foundation.

== Early life and family ==
Jha was born on 5 March 1944 in Sarisav Pahi village, Madhubani district, Bihar. His father was Babu Chemkar Jha, also known as Baldeo Jha, and his mother was Mohini Devi. He studied in the village school.

== Education ==
He matriculated from Maharaja Lakshmeshwar Singh Academy, Sarisab Pahi, Dist Madhubani. He attended Patna Science College and went on to Post Graduate work at Patna University. He gained his B.A. Hons. in Sociology at Patna College in 1965, his M.A. in sociology at Patna University in 1967, and his PhD in sociology at Patna University in 1980. Won Patna University Students' Union election in 1967-68 and served as vice-president.

== Career ==
He joined Patna University as a lecturer in sociology in 1968 and retired as Professor and Head of the Department of Sociology in January 2004.

Beginning in 1968, he researched the societies and cultures of Bihar. Among his conclusions is that: A basic problem is the break down of the traditional village community as a functioning whole.

Jha wrote several books.

== Death ==
Jha died on 19 August 2017 in Patna, Bihar at the age 73. He was cremated in his native village Sarisav Pahi in Madhubani district. He was survived by his wife and sons.
