= Manimandapa =

Hindu temple in Nepal

- मणिमंडप
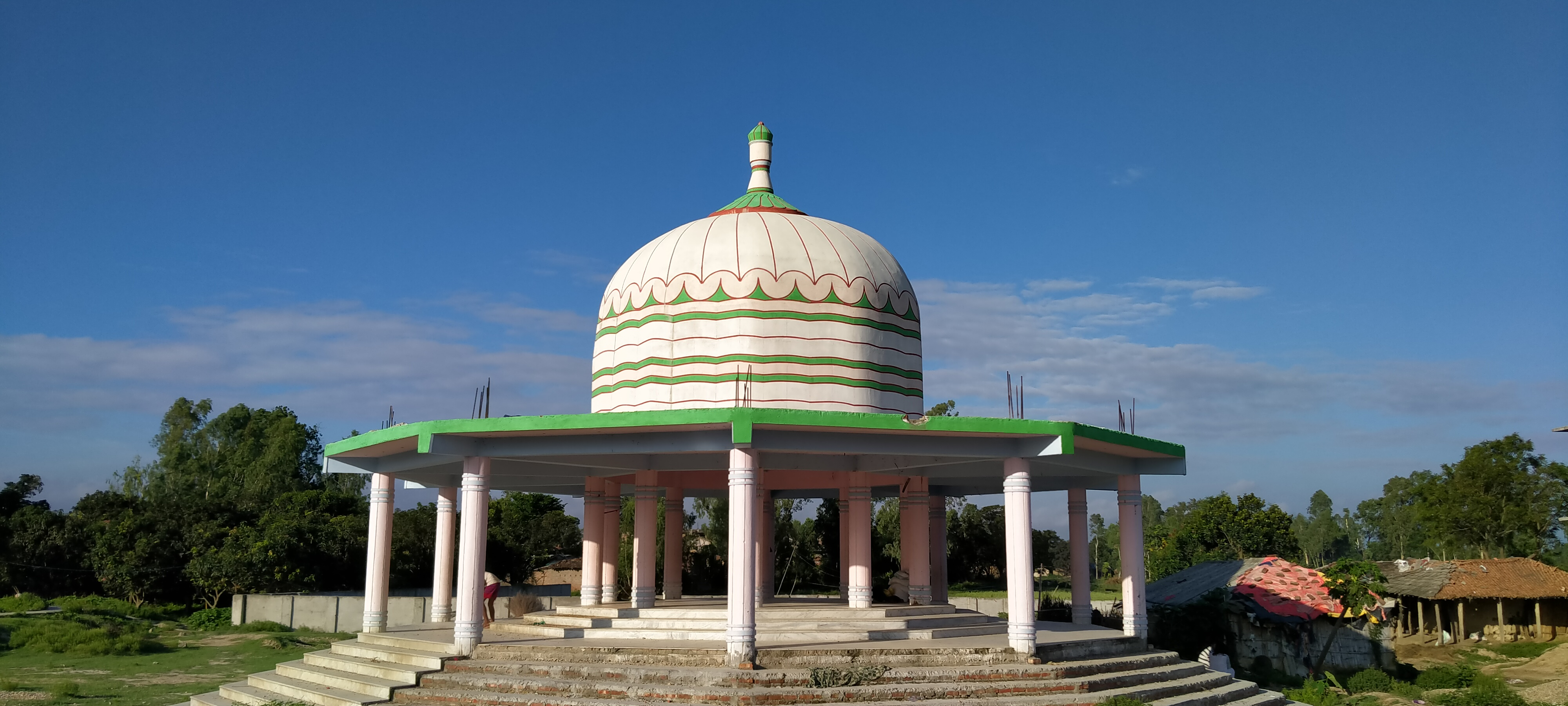
- Manimandapa Mandir believed to be the place of marriage between Lord Rama and Goddess Sita

Religion
- Affiliation: Hinduism
- District: Dhanusha District
- Province: Madhesh Pradesh
- Deity: Lord Rama and Goddess Sita
- Festival: Vivaha Panchami

Location
- Location: Rani Bazar, Janakpur, Mithila region, Nepal
- Country: Nepal
- Interactive map of Manimandapa
- Coordinates: 26.7593750°N 85.9150037°E
- Marriage place of Lord Rama and Goddess Sita

Manimandapa (Maithili: मणिमंडप) is a Hindu temple believed by some to be the place of marriage between the Prince Rama of Ayodhya and the Princess Sita of Mithila Kingdom. It is located at the outskirts of Janakpur city in the Mithila region of Nepal.

== Background ==
In the Ramayana, King Janaka of Mithila Kingdom organised a famous Swayamvar Sabha for the marriage of his daughter Princess Sita at the court of the kingdom. In the Swayamvar Sabha King Janaka put a condition that whoever be able to uplift the Pinaka bow and broke it would be eligible for marriage with his daughter Princess Sita. It is said that in the Swayamvar Sabha all the kings of Aryavarta were invited to participate. According to the Ramayana, no one was able to uplift the bow except Prince Rama of Ayodhya. In the Swayamvar Sabha, Prince Rama uplifted the bow Pinaka and broke it into three pieces. It is believed by some adherents that one piece of the bow went into the sky, the other into the Patala (underworld), and the third onto the earth. Prince Rama was declared as the winner of the competition in Swayamvar Sabha. After Prince Rama broke the bow in the Swayamvar Sabha, Princess Sita garlanded him.

== Description ==
According to legend, after the prince Rama broke the bow at the court of the King Janaka, the procession for marriage along with King Dasharatha came from Ayodhya to Mithila. According to legendary story in Mithila, after winning Swayamvar Sabha at the court of Janaka, Prince Rama along with his three brothers were married at Manimandapa with Princess Sita and her three sisters. The place where the altar and sacrificial pavilion (Yajna Mandap) decorated with gems was built for the marriage in Janakpur is near Rani Bazar known Manimandapa. In the campus of the shrine there is a pond where the feet of the four brothers were washed at the time of the marriage.

== New construction ==
Due to the historical, cultural and legendary significance of the site, the premises of the temple is being developed since last seven years by the federal government of Nepal. A new garden called as Sita Pushpa Vatika has been developed in the campus of the temple. The garden has been designed to reflect the beauty of Mithila's civilisation and nature during the Ramayan-era. Similarly, two-storied Janak Durbar building, a dharmashala, Swayamvar Mandap and two pavilions have been constructed in the campus of the temple. Some shopping rooms have also been constructed in the premises for tourism purpose. The area of the premises of the temple is about two bighas of land. The development of the premises of the temple is aimed to attract tourists and make it as a wedding destination.

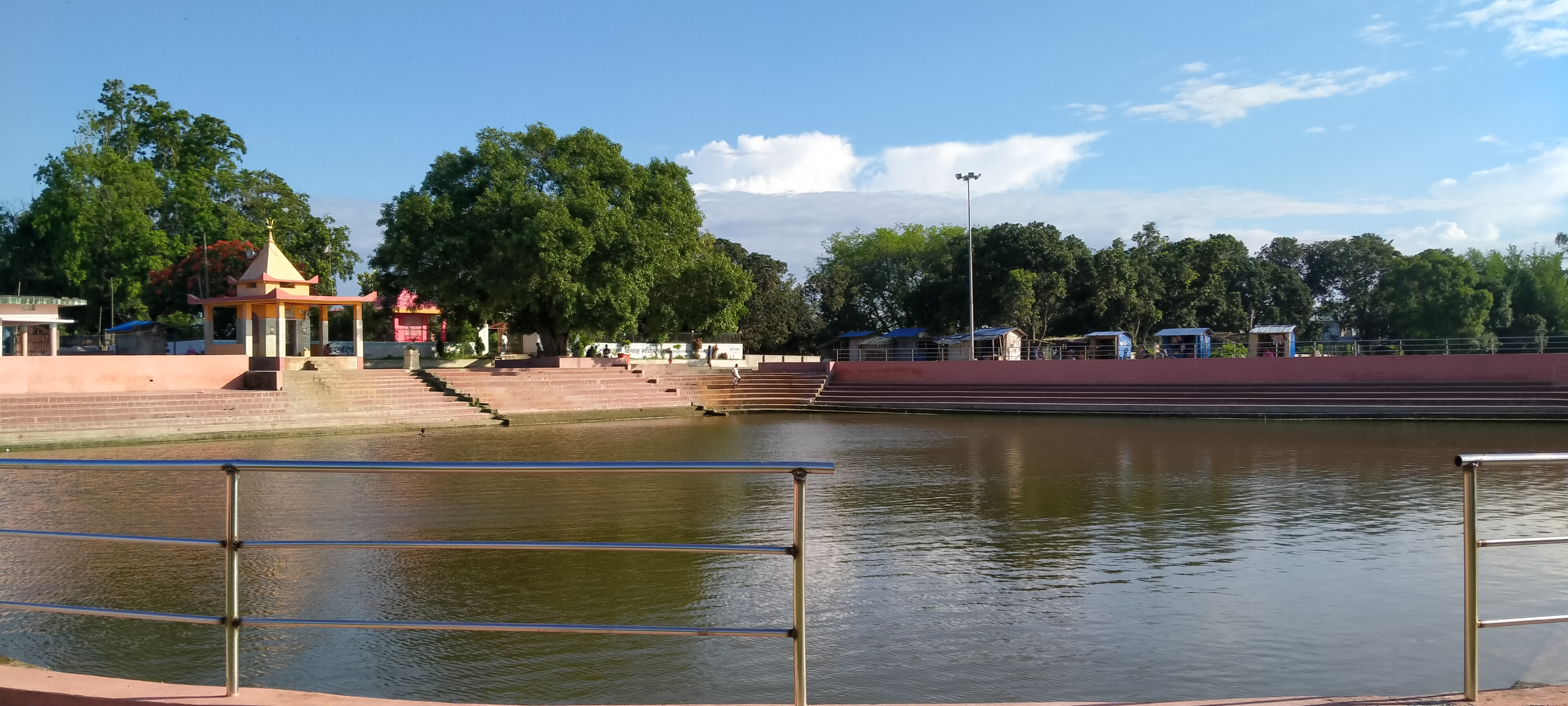
The pond in the campus of Manimandapa where princes Rama and his three brothers washed their feet during the marriage ceremony
