= Minakshi (Manki) =

Royal lady dancer in Mithila

- मीनाक्षी
- Born: Sarisav Pahi, Manki Dih
- Monuments: Manki Dih
- Other name: Manki
- Occupation: Royal lady dancer
- Era: 11th century CE
- Known for: Protection of the manuscripts of the scholars in Mithila

Minakshi alias Manki (Maithili: मीनाक्षी उर्फ मनकी) was a royal lady dancer at the court of King Nanyadeva in the Karnat Dynasty of Mithila. Apart from being a royal lady dancer, she was also a brave woman. She sacrificed her life to protect the manuscripts of the scholars in Mithila. She is remembered for her life sacrifice in the protection of the manuscripts.

== Later life ==
Minakshi was a royal dancer who belonged to the Nat caste. According to legend, she was the court dancer of the king of Amravati and she was very loyal to her king and the kingdom. It is said that Mithila was attacked many times by outsider invaders to steal the manuscripts of the scholars in the kingdom. Once Mithila was attacked by Bengali and Navadwip invaders, so that they could steal the centre of knowledge from here and take it to their place. Minakshi came to know about this, then she took out everything from the box in which the manuscripts were being carried and locked herself in it and left. In this way she became the protector of the state and sacrificed her life for the protection of the manuscripts in Mithila.

== Legacy ==
There is a historical dih named after her name at Sarso village in the Madhubani district of the Mithila region in Bihar. The dih is known as Manki Dih. It was her residence place. Presently there is remains of the dih . In the government records, it is listed as "Man ki Dih". Several scholars in the region, have conducted researches about this place. The scholars who have mentioned the historical place in their books are Manmohan Jha, Sadan Mishra, and Arvind Kumar Akku, etc.

Similarly her story of bravery is still played at different drama theatres in the country. The drama is known as 'Minakshi' or 'Rajnartaki Manki'. The author of the drama book was Mohan Jha. It is based on the life of the royal dancer Minakshi during the Karnat Dynasty in Mithila. The story of the drama centers on the battle fought between King Nanyadeva of Mithila and King Ballalasen of Bengal, in 1070 AD. This is a unique battle, perhaps the only such battle in history, fought solely to plunder rare scriptures. In the story, Minakshi, uses her skill and intelligence to not only save the rare manuscripts of Mithila but also save the life of her king, Nanyadeva, and the kingdom of Mithila at the cost of her own life. Similarly, the other Indian author Geetashree composed a novel on the bravery life of Minakshi. The novel was named Rajnatani. The novel is based on the love story of Minakshi and the Banga prince Ballal Sen. It is also the life story of a royal dancer who sacrificed herself for the country. The author in her novel points out about the royal dancer Minakshi that when it came to national security, she gave importance to the Mithila's pride and its protection rather than her deep love with the prince Ballala Sena of Banga.
