= Baag Taraag Pushpavatika =

Place in Mithila, Bihar, India

- बाग तराग पुष्पवाटिका
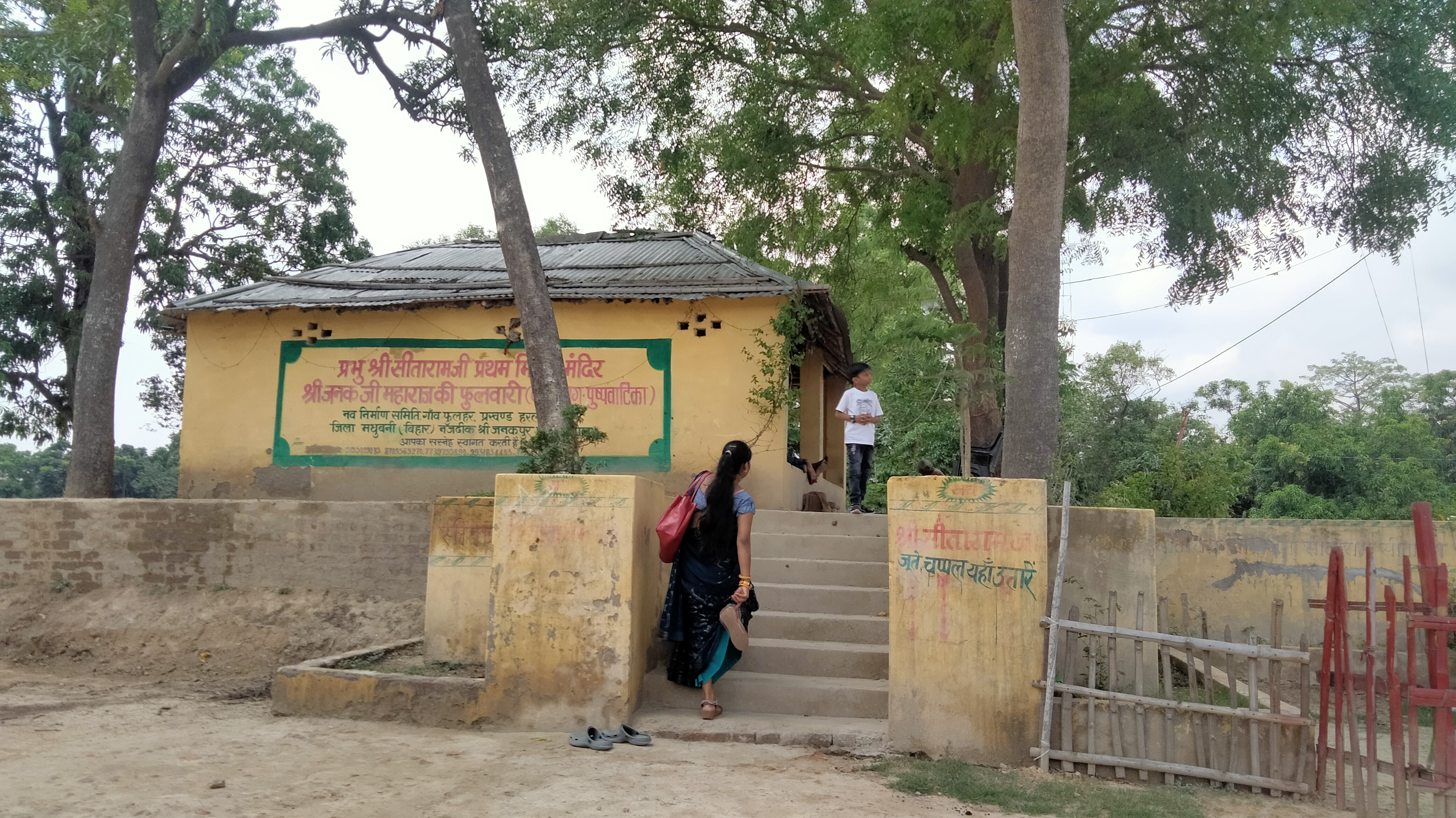
- View of the Prabhu Shree Sitaramji Pratham Milan Mandir at the campus of the Baag Taraag Pushpavatika

Religion
- Affiliation: Hinduism
- District: Madhubani district
- Deity: Lord Rama and Goddess Sita

Location
- Location: Phulhar village, Mithila region
- State: Bihar
- Country: India
- Interactive map of Baag Taraag Pushpavatika
- Coordinates: 26.5892236°N 85.9073809°E

Architecture
- Founder: King Janaka
- Established: Treta Yuga of Ramayana
- Inscriptions: Ancient sculptures of Shree Sita
- Designated as NHL: Places in Ramayana
- Prabhu Shree Sitaramji Pratham Milan Mandir

Baag Taraag Pushpavatika (Maithili: बाग तराग पुष्पवाटिका) is a legendary place in the Mithila region of Bihar. It is related to the Hindu epic Ramayana. It is located at Phulhar village of the Harlakhi block in the Madhubani district. The location is mentioned in the text Ramacharitmanas composed by the Awadhi poet Tulsidas. It is at a distance of 350 metres from the site of the Girija Sthan Dham. Baag Taraag is a sacred pond and similarly Pushpavatika is the name of the legendary flower garden on its bank mentioned in the text Ramayana. In the legendary garden, there is a temple dedicated to Lord Rama and Goddess Sita. The temple is known as Prabhu Shree Sitaramji Pratham Milan Mandir. It is identified as the origin place of love between the divine couple in Ramayana. The temple is looked after a Mahant. The present Mahant of the temple is Bihari Pandey.

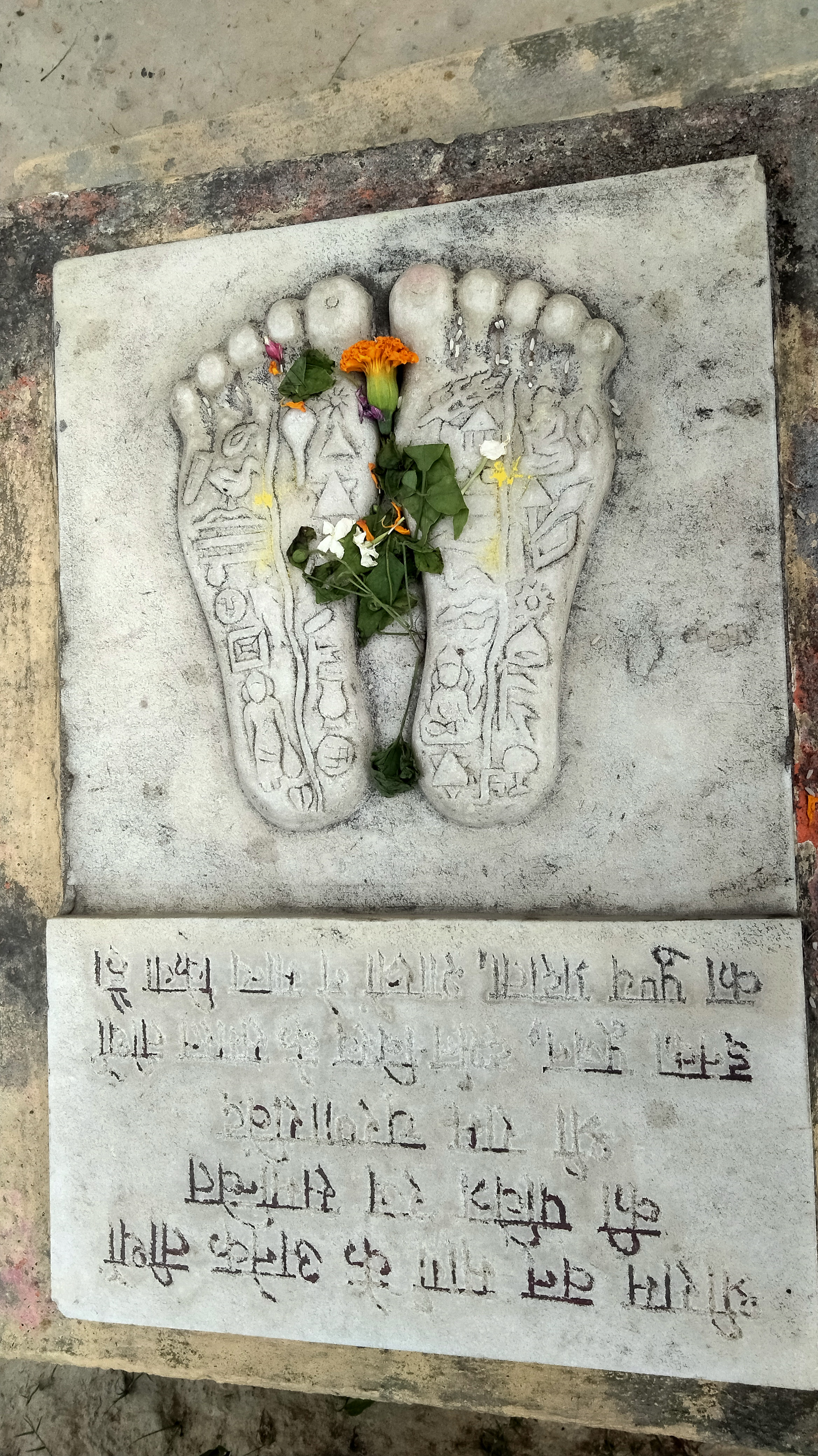
Iconic Prabhu Shree Rama Charanaravind established at Baag Taraag Pushpavatika

== Description ==
The Baag Taraag Pushpavatika is connected by the National Highway 227 (formerly called National Highway 104) passing through the village of Phulhar, across the country. The ancient sacred pond Baag Taraag still exists in the campus of the site. The survey team led by Sanjeet Kumar from the Tourism Department of the Bihar Government has conducted a survey of the Baag Taraag Pushpavatika along with the Girija Sthan Dham on 28 February 2025. The team made an online measurement of the geographical position of these two locations. The sites of the legendary garden Baag Taraag Pushpavatika and the Girija Sthan Dham have been recognised as the tourism destination for Hindu pilgrimage. The Government of Bihar led by the chief minister Nitish Kumar has announced to provide funds of amount 31.13 crores for the development of the divine garden Baag Taraag Pushpavatika and the Girija Sthan Dham. The famous sculptor Dr. Anil Ram Sutar, who designed the grand statue of Sardar Vallabhbhai Patel (Statue of Unity), reviewed the location of the Baag Taraag Pushpavatika as well as Girija Sthan of the Phulhar village on 15 June 2025. Similarly the famous architect Rimpesh Sharma also reviewed the location on the same day. They said that Girija Sthan Dham as well as Baag Taraag Pushpavatika would be developed as tourist destinations which would give to Mithila a new look as a tourist destination.

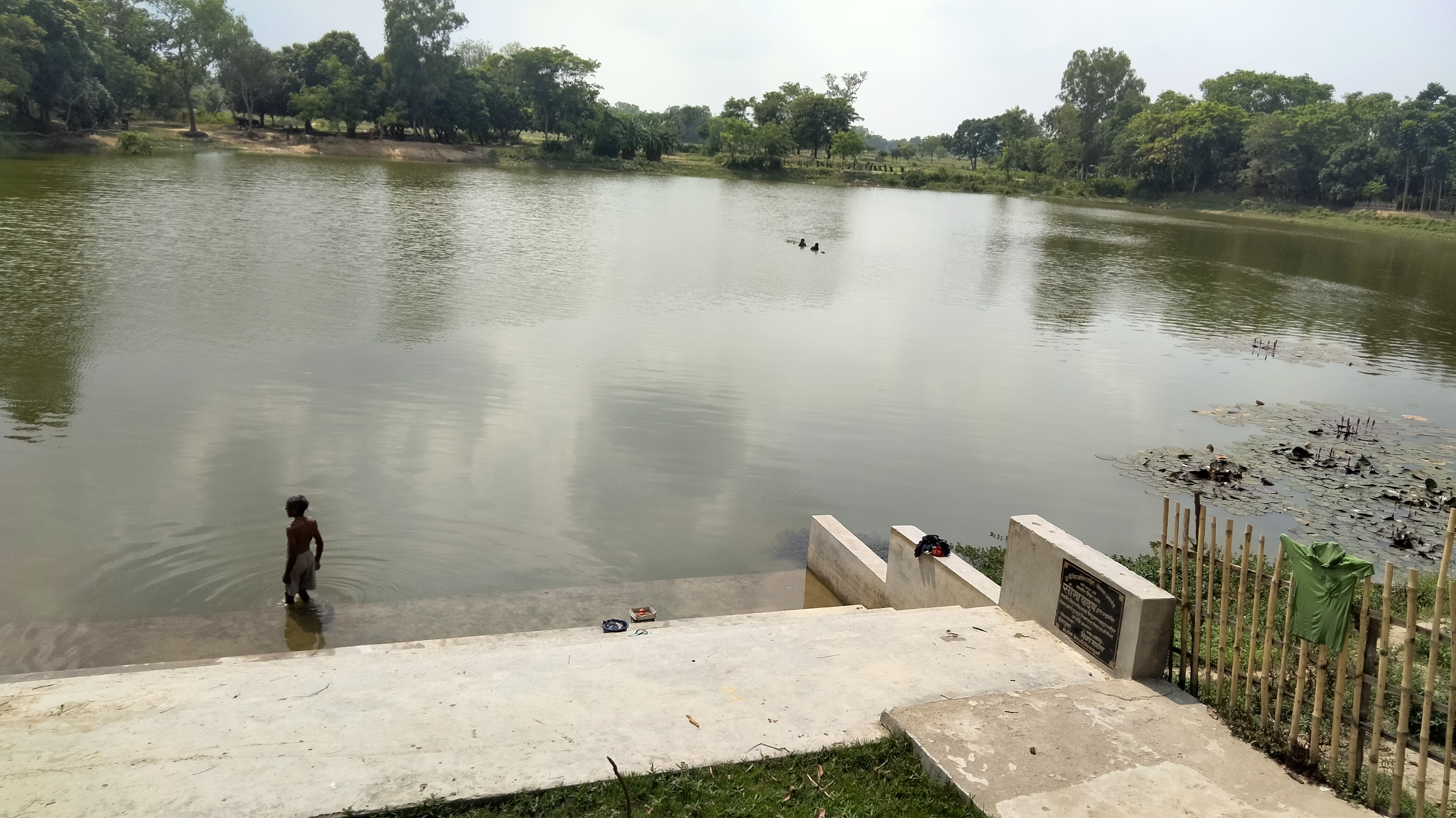
View of the sacred Baag Taraag pond

According to legend, princess Sita of the ancient Mithila Kingdom used to come from Janakpur every day to bathe in the Baag Tarag pond in Phulhar and pluck flowers from the flower garden Pushpavatika and worship Girija Devi at Girija Sthan. According to the text Ramacharitmanas, Lord Rama and Lakshmana came here in the garden of Baag Taraag to pluck some flowers for the worship of Guru Vishwamitra, during their journey to Mithila. More than just a garden, this site holds a significant place in the epic tale of the Ramayana, believed to be the very spot where the divine couple, Rama and Sita, first laid eyes on each other.

The Awadhi poet Tulsidas in his text Ramacharitmanas mentioned about the divine garden at Doha number 227 in the Bal Kand section of the text. The Doha is as follows

"बागु तारागु बिलोकि प्रभु हरषे, बंधु समेत परम रम्य आराम यहु, जो राम ही सुख देत"

— Tulsidas, Bal Kand, Doha 227, Ramacharitmanas

According to the Doha 227, Lord Rama along with his brother Lakshmana were delighted by seeing the garden Pushpavatika and the lake Baag Taraag. The garden was indeed very beautiful, which gave immense happiness to Lord Rama.

== Ramacharitmanas's description ==
In the text Ramacharitmanas, there is a separate episode or chapter called Pushpavatika Nireekshan in the section Bal Kand which gives the complete and detailed description of the divine garden Pushpavakita and the divine pond Baag Taraag in the centre of the divine garden. The focus of the chapter is the first mutual meeting of the princess Sita of the ancient Mithila Kingdom with the prince Rama of the ancient Kosala Kingdom in the Indian subcontinent and first time laying eyes on each other.

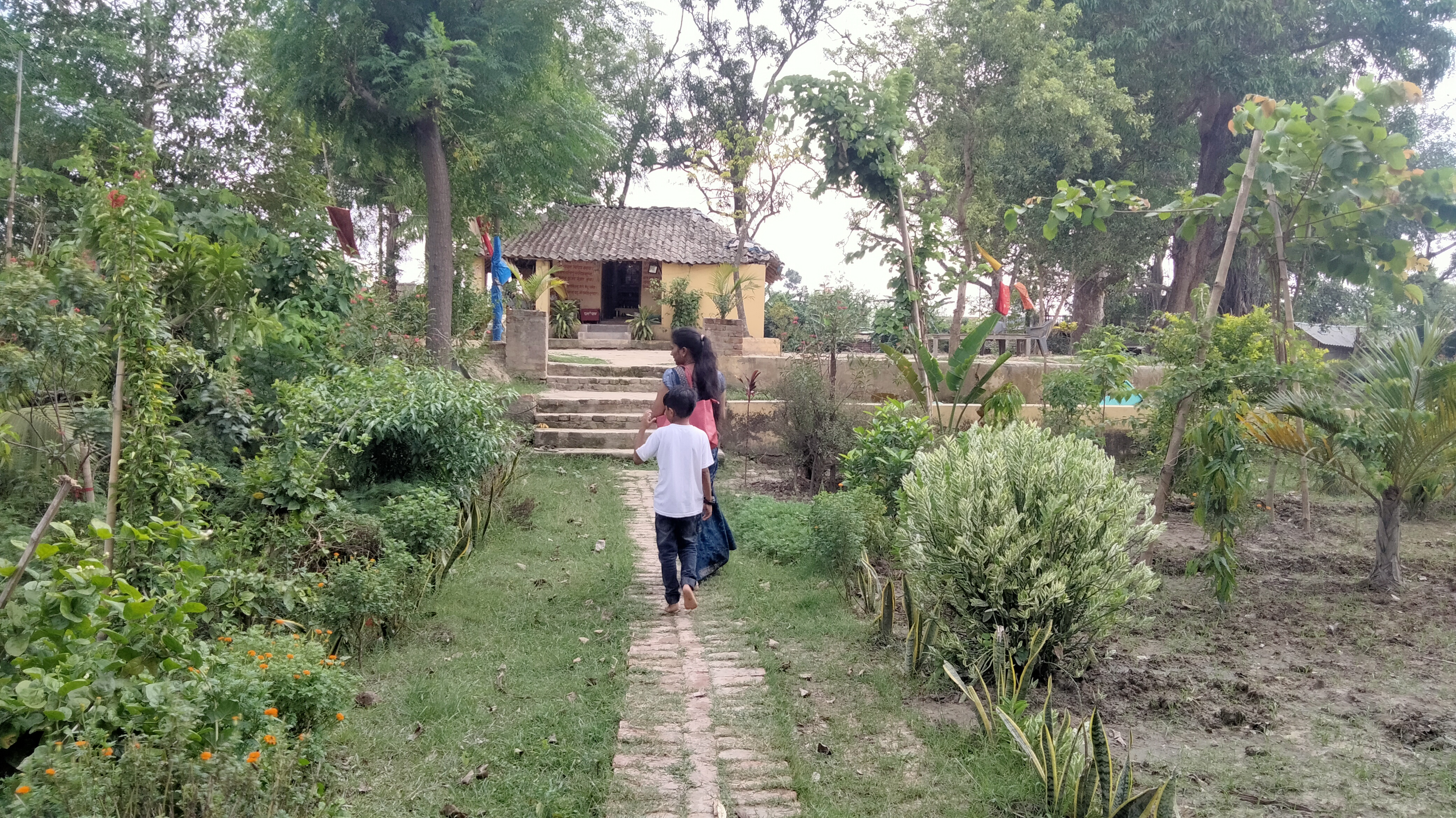
View of the divine garden Pushpavakita

According the Chaupai of Doha number 226 of the Ramacharitmanas, Lord Rama and Lakshmana went to the Pushpavatika in the morning after staying a night at the Vishwamitra Ashram and saw the beautiful garden of the King Janaka, where the spring season was charming. There were many beautiful trees with new leaves, fruits and flowers that attracted them. In the garden, there were pavilions of colorful vines. Different types of birds like parrots, cuckoos, and chakors, etc were speaking sweetly and peacocks were dancing beautifully in the garden. According to the fourth Chaupai, there was a beautiful lake Baag Taraag in the center of the garden Pushpavatika which had intricate beaded steps. Its water was clear, in which lotus flowers of different colors were blooming and aquatic birds were chirping.

== Renovation ==
On 26 November 2025, the District Magistrate Anand Sharma of the Madhubani district inspected the site for the upcoming development projects there. On the occasion of Makar Sankranti on 14 January 2026, the tourism minister Arun Shankar Prasad of the Bihar Government performed Bhoomi Pujan at the premises for the renovation of the legendary site. The laying down of the foundation stone was performed in the presence several saints-sages from Janakpur Dham of Nepal, the Mahant of Charaut Matha of Sitamarhi, local MLA Sudhanshu Shekhar and a large number of devotees present in the premises. The legendary site has been designated as a major tourist destination of the Ramayana circuit.

As part of the renovations, two ancient broken sculptures were excavated from the pond on 28 and 29 May 2026. One was a broken ancient stone statue of Sita, and the other a golden metallic sculpture related to Sita. There is Tirhuta script of this region on both sculptures. On the golden metallic sculpture, there is an inscription written in some legendary languages of the region, now unknown to the local populace, except for a handwritten "Shri Sita". The stone statue was re-established at the premises of the Prabhu Shree Sitaramji Pratham Milan Mandir. When the news of the excavation of the ancient sculptures spread in the areas around the temple, a large number of devotees flocked to worship the ancient sculptures.
