= Shree Rama Charanaravind =

Iconic representation of the Lotus feet of Lord Rama

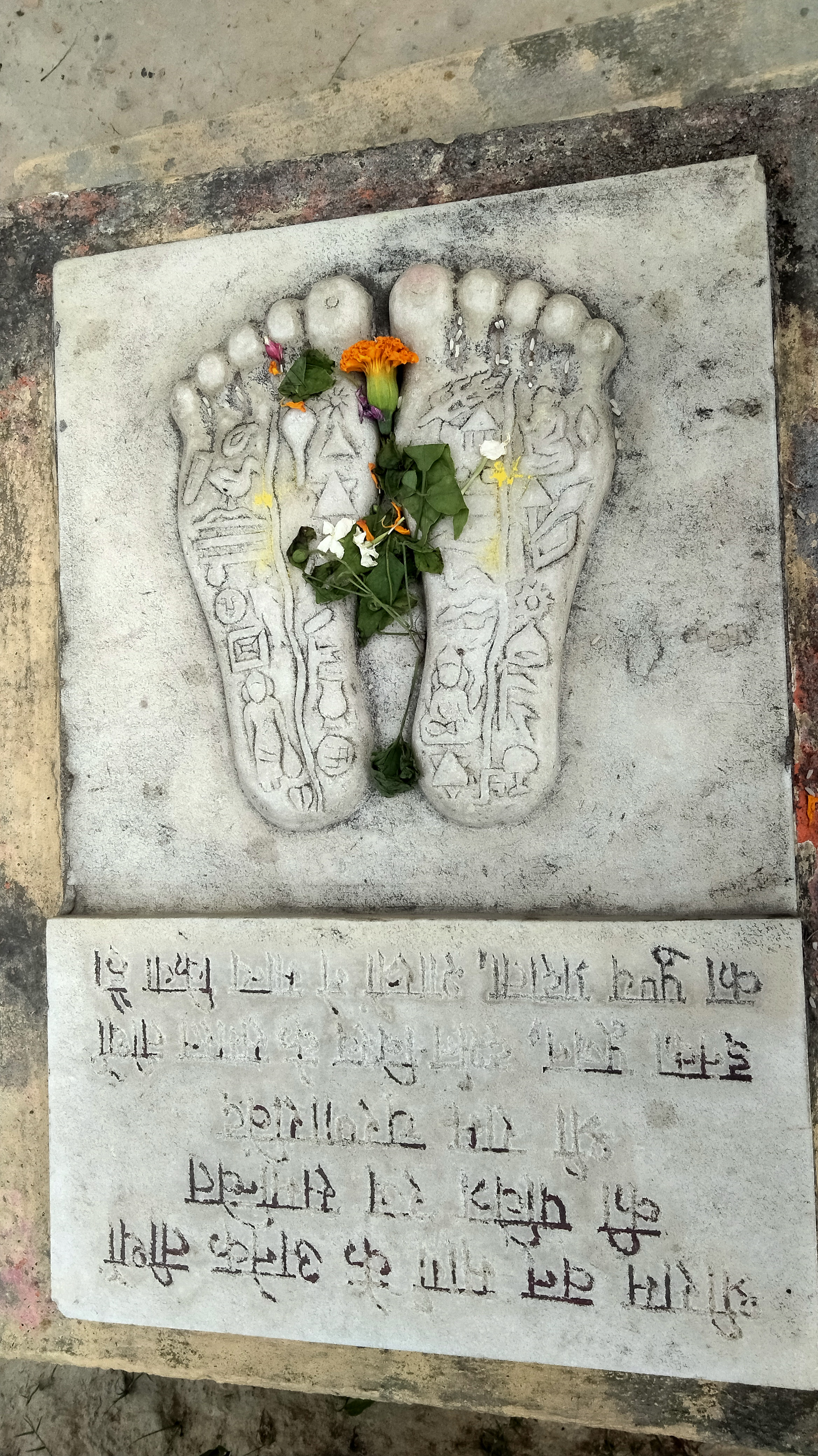
The iconic Shree Rama Charanaravind established at the Baag Taraag Pushpavatika in Phulhar village of the Mithila region in Bihar

Shree Rama Charanaravind (Devanagari: श्री राम चरणारविंद) is an iconic representation of the sacred feet of Lord Rama in Hinduism. In Hindu devotional traditions, the feet of Lord Rama are considered exceptionally sacred. It is also known as Shree Rama Charanpaduka. In the Indian subcontinent, the devotees of Lord Rama have established symbolic images of Shree Rama Charanaravinds at several locations where Lord Rama is believed to have arrived.

== Etymology ==
In Hinduism, Shree is an honorific title, often used for deities, respected individuals, or sacred texts. It signifies auspiciousness, respect, holiness, and prosperity. Rama is the name of the major deity in Hinduism, considered the seventh avatar (incarnation) of Lord Vishnu. He is revered as the epitome of righteousness (dharma), virtue, and ideal manhood, and is the central figure of the epic Ramayana. The term Charanaravind is a combined Sanskrit word having two terms Charan and Aravind. The term Charan means feet, and the term Aravind translates to lotus flower. Thus, "Shree Rama Charanaravind" literally translates to "The auspicious lotus feet of Lord Rama."

== Description ==
The Shree Rama Charanaravind is deeply rooted since the period of the Ramayana in the Indian subcontinent. The sacredness of the lotus feet of Lord Rama have been described in several Hindu religious texts related to Lord Rama. It can be traced from the texts Ramayana, Puranas and Bhagwatam, etc. In Ramayana, Bharata bowed down the sandals used by the sacred lotus feet of Lord Rama.

In recent years, Ram Avatar Sharma, a researcher at Shri Ram Cultural Research Institute Trust, has created a map of Lord Rama's forest wanderings. He has identified several locations in the subcontinent where Lord Rama arrived in the Treta Yuga of the Ramayana. He has established the iconic Shree Rama Charanaravinds at these places.

In the Indian subcontinent, there are several locations related to Lord Rama. The places where Lord Rama either incarnated or performed any kind of pastime are known as Bhagavadiya Tirthas. All these Bhagavadiya Tirthas on which Lord Rama's feet once fell became divine. Therefore, at these locations, Shree Rama Charanaravinds were established.
