= Patepur =

Community development block in Vaishali district, Bihar, India

- Community Development Block
- Location in Bihar, India Patepur (India) Patepur (Asia)
- Coordinates: 25°47′49″N 85°12′24″E
- Country: India
- State: Bihar
- District: vaishali
- District Sub-division: Mahua
- Anchal: Patepur
- Vidhan Sabha constituency: Patepur

Government
  - Type: Community development block

Population (2001)
  - Total: 282,845

Language
  - Official: Hindi
  - Additional official: Urdu
- Time zone: UTC+5:30 (IST)
- ISO 3166 code: IN-BR

Patepur is a community development block and Nagar panchayat (since 2020) in vaishali district, bihar state, According to the census website all blocks in bihar state Nomenclature as C.D.Block ( community development blocks

== Villages ==
- Number of Panchayat : 32
- Number of Villages : 138

== Population and communities ==
- Male Population : 146150 (2009 ist.)
- Female Population : 136695
- Total Population : 282845
- SC Total Population : 61662
- ST Total Population : 150
- Minority Total Population : 48867
- Population Density : 1102
- Sex Ratio : 935

== Education ==
- Literacy rate : 52.5% (2019 ist.)
- Male literacy rate : 67.1%
- Female literacy rate : 40.2%

=== School ===
- Primary School : 136 (2009 ist.)
- Upper Primary School : 108
