= List of railway lines in Nepal =

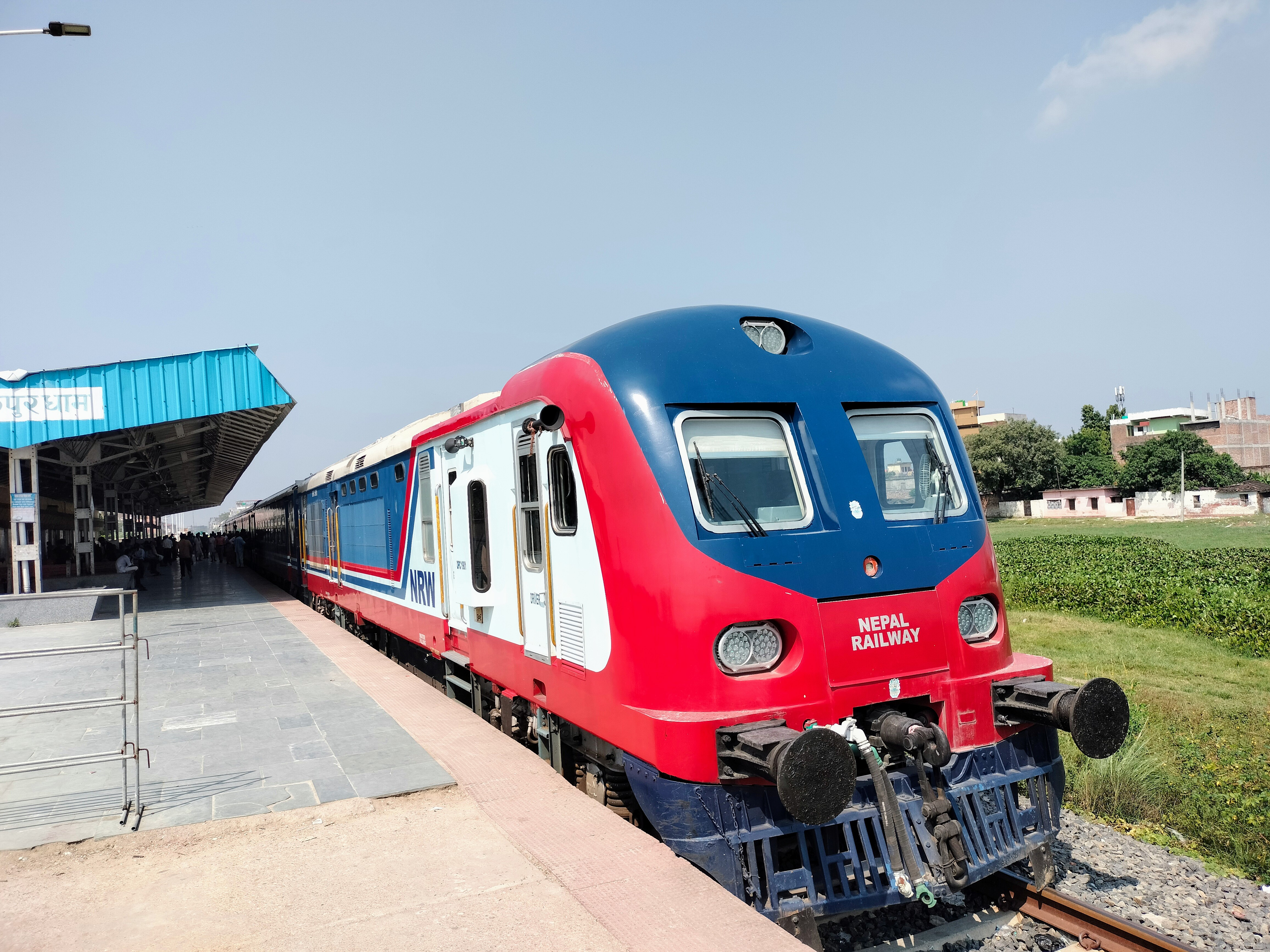
A Nepal Railway DEMU train at Janakpur

This is a list of existing, under-construction, and proposed railway lines in Nepal, a landlocked nation currently undergoing a significant transition from a historically limited rail presence to a modern, electrified transportation network. While Bardibas-Jaynagar line remains the only operational passenger rail service in the country, several new lines are in the phase of planning and construction.

== History ==
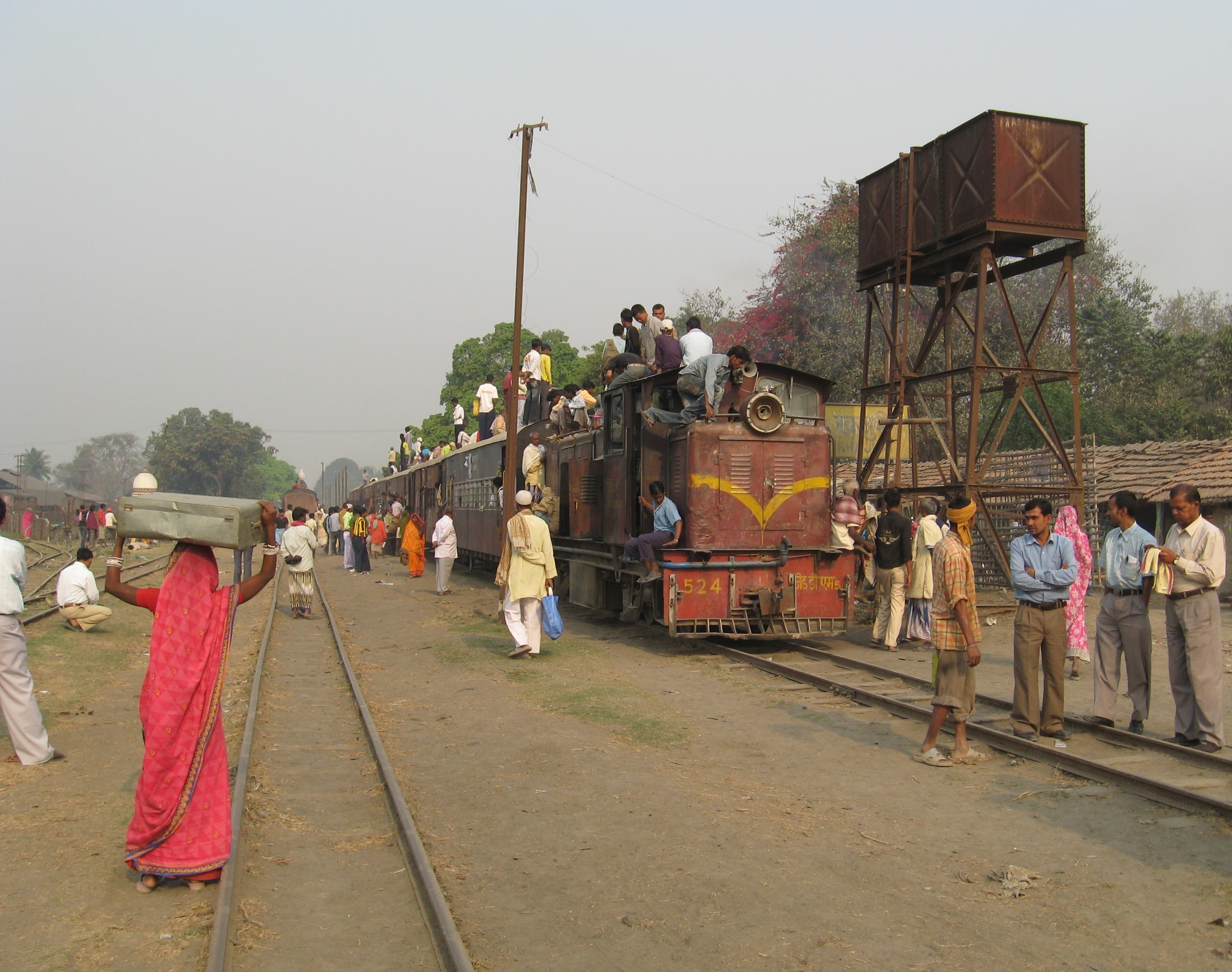
A Nepal Railway narrow gauge train at Khajuri in 2009

The history of rail transport in Nepal can be divided into three eras, the early Rana-era of narrow gauge lines of 1920, the decline of railway lines in mid-20th century and the modern plans for revival and electrification.

=== Early Rana-era lines ===
The first railway of Nepal, Nepal Government Railway (NGR) was established between Raxaul in India to Amlekhganj in Nepal. It was around 47 km (29 mi) long and was based on narrow gauge system. The main purpose of this railway was to export Timber from lush forests of Terai to British India and later India. After nearly a decade in 1937, Nepal Janakpur Jaynagar Railway was established to transport passengers and woods to Indian town of Jaynagar from Janakpur.

=== The fall of railways ===
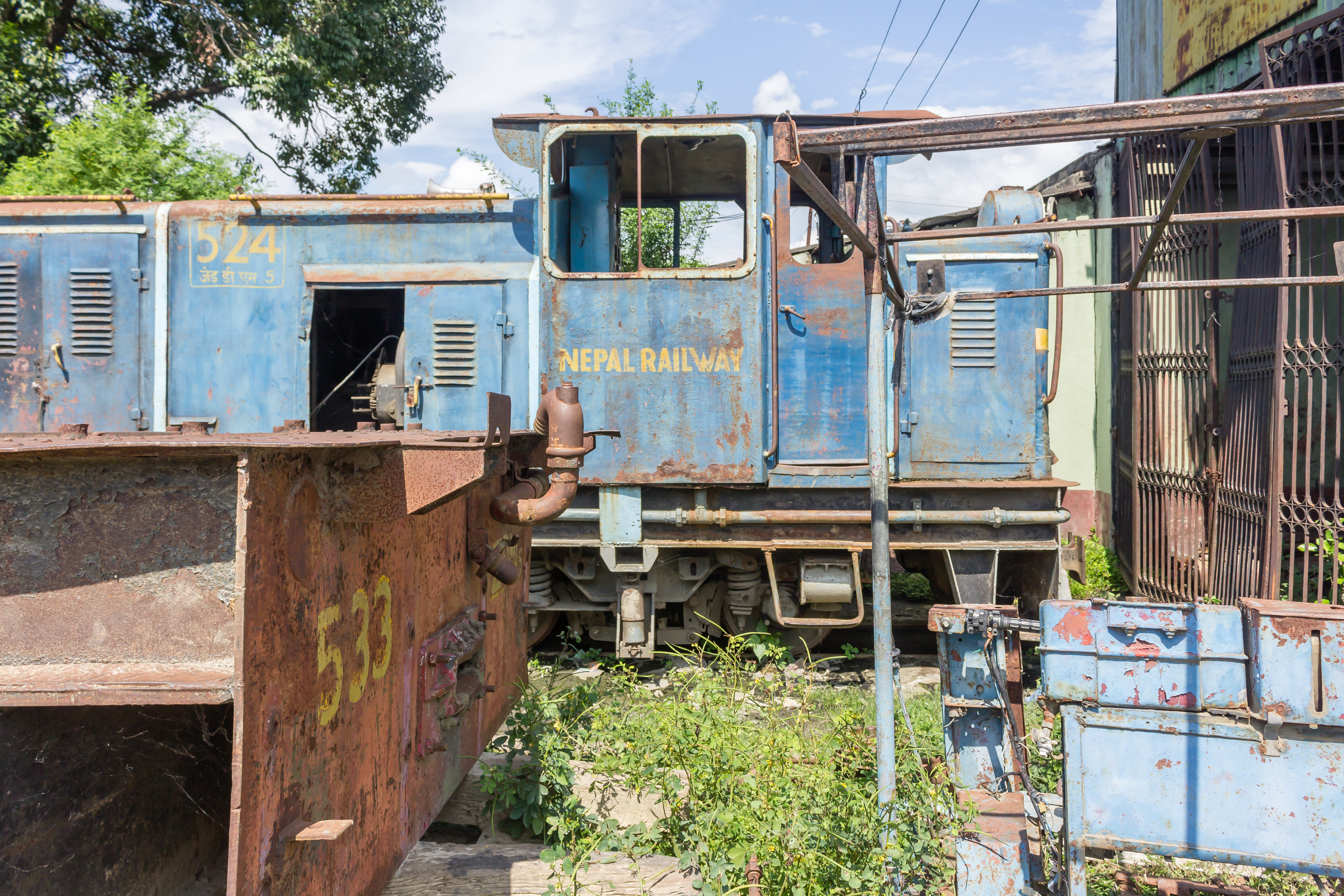
An abandoned locomotive of Nepal Railway

After the fall of Rana-rule and political uncertainty in the nation, the government started focusing on highways, leaving railways in limbo. The quality of service, lack of maintenance and aging infrastructure eventually forced the last remaining passenger railway, NJJR to shut down in 2014.

=== Modern revival ===
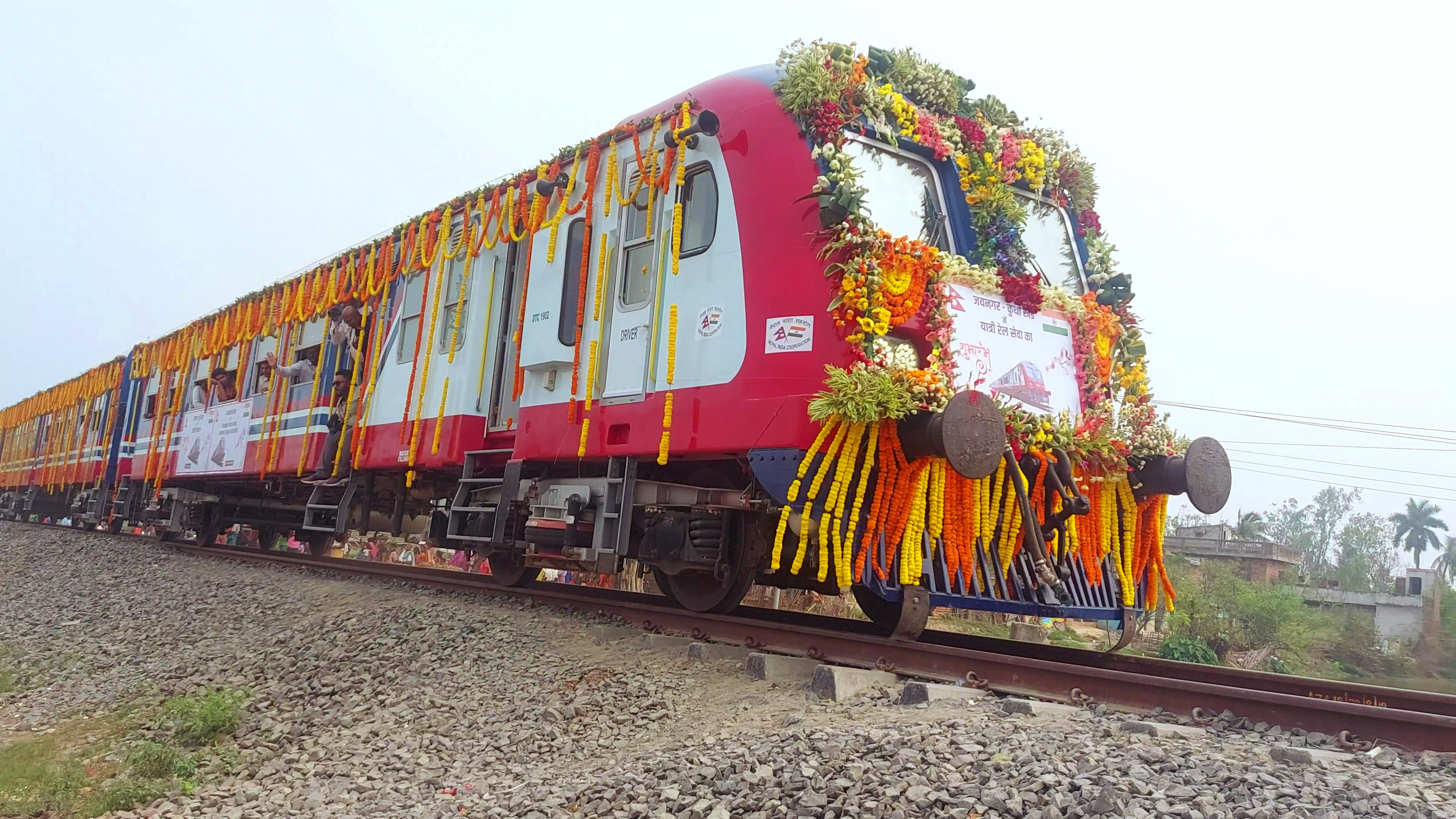
Nepal Railway DEMU train in its inaugural run, 2022

The revival of Nepali Railways started when the government formally established Department of Railways in 2011. The government, under technical and financial support from Government of India, converted the Jaynagar-Janakpur narrow gauge line into broad gauge and extending it till Bardibas in 2022. Currently, Nepal Government is working with multiple projects, notably East-West Railway, Raxaul-Kathmandu railway and Kerung-Kathmandu railway all of which are planned to be electrified.

== Railway lines ==
Line	Status	Operator(s)	Type	Gauge	Opened	Length	Speed	Electrified	Notes	Ref.
(British Raj) (India); Raxaul-Amlekhganj (Nepal)	Defunct	Nepal Government Railway (NGR)	Freight & Passenger	Narrow	1927	47 km (29 mi)	15 km/h (9.3 mph)	Steam	Closed in 1965	
(British Raj) (India); Jaynagar-Bijalpura (Nepal)	Defunct	Nepal Janakpur Jaynagar Railway (NJJR)	Freight & Passenger	Narrow	1937	51 km (32 mi)	15 km/h (9.3 mph)	Steam/Diesel	Closed in 2014; replaced by Jaynagar-Bardibas broad gauge line	
(India); Bhimnagar-Dharan (Nepal)	Defunct	Kosi Project Railway	Freight	Narrow	1958	66 km (41 mi)	Unknown	Steam	Closed in late 1960s after construction of Koshi Barrage completed	
(India); Raxaul-Sirsiya (Nepal)	Active	-	Freight	Broad	2005	6 km (3.7 mi)	30 km/h (19 mph)	No		
(India); Jaynagar-Bardibas (Nepal)	Active	Nepal Railway (NRW)	Passenger	Broad	2022	68.72 km (42.70 mi)	120 km/h (75 mph)	No (planned in future)	Jaynagar-Bijalpura section operational; Bijalpura-Bardibas under construction	
(India); Bathnaha-Biratnagar (Nepal)	Active	-	Freight	Broad	2023	18.6 km (11.6 mi)	110 km/h (68 mph)	No	Bathnaha-Birtanagar ICP constructed; Biratnagar ICP-Katahari under construction	
(Nepal); Kakarbhitta-Bhimdatta (Nepal)	Under Construction	-	Passenger & Freight	Standard	-	945.44 km (587.47 mi)	200 km/h (120 mph)	Planned	Construction of Bardibas-Nijgadh section going on as priority	
(India); Raxaul-Kathmandu (Nepal)	DPR finalized	-	Passenger & Freight	Broad	-	136 km (85 mi)	120 km/h (75 mph)	Planned	Estimated cost at $3 billion	
(China); Kerung-Kathmandu (Nepal)	Feasibility study ongoing	-	Passenger & Freight	Standard	-	73 km (45 mi)	120 km/h (75 mph)	Planned	Estimated cost at $5.5 billion	
(Nepal); Kathmandu-Pokhara (Nepal)	Proposed	-	Passenger & Freight	Standard	-	187.083 km (116.248 mi)	160 km/h (99 mph)	Planned	Estimated cost at $2.8 billion	
(Nepal); Tamasariya-Aanbu Khaireni (Nepal)	Proposed	-	Passenger & Freight	Standard	-	71.72 km (44.56 mi)	160 km/h (99 mph)	Planned	Estimated cost at $527 million	
(India); Rupaidiha-Kohalpur (Nepal)	Surveys completed	-	Passenger & Freight	Broad	-	18.5 km (11.5 mi)	TBD	Unknown	Construction hasn't proceeded after completion of surveys in 2018 due to various reasons	
(India); Barhani-Kathmandu (Nepal)	Proposed (uncertain)	-	TBD	Broad	-	approx. 330 km (210 mi)	TBD	Unknown	No physical progress made since 2016	
(India); Nautanwa-Siddharthnagar (Nepal)	Proposed	-	Passenger & Freight	Broad	-	15.3 km (9.5 mi)	TBD	Unknown		
(Nepal); Kakarbhitta-New Jalpaiguri (India)	Proposed	-	Passenger & Freight	Broad	-	38 km (24 mi)	110 km/h (68 mph)	Planned		
Kathmandu Metrorail (Nepal)	Early planning phase	-	Light rail	Standard	-	TBD	60 km/h (37 mph)	Planned	Actual implementation uncertain	

== See also ==
- Nepal Railway Company Limited
- List of railway stations in Nepal
- Department of Railways (Nepal)
- Transport in Nepal
