= Department of Railways (Nepal) =

Nepalese rail transport department

- रेल विभाग
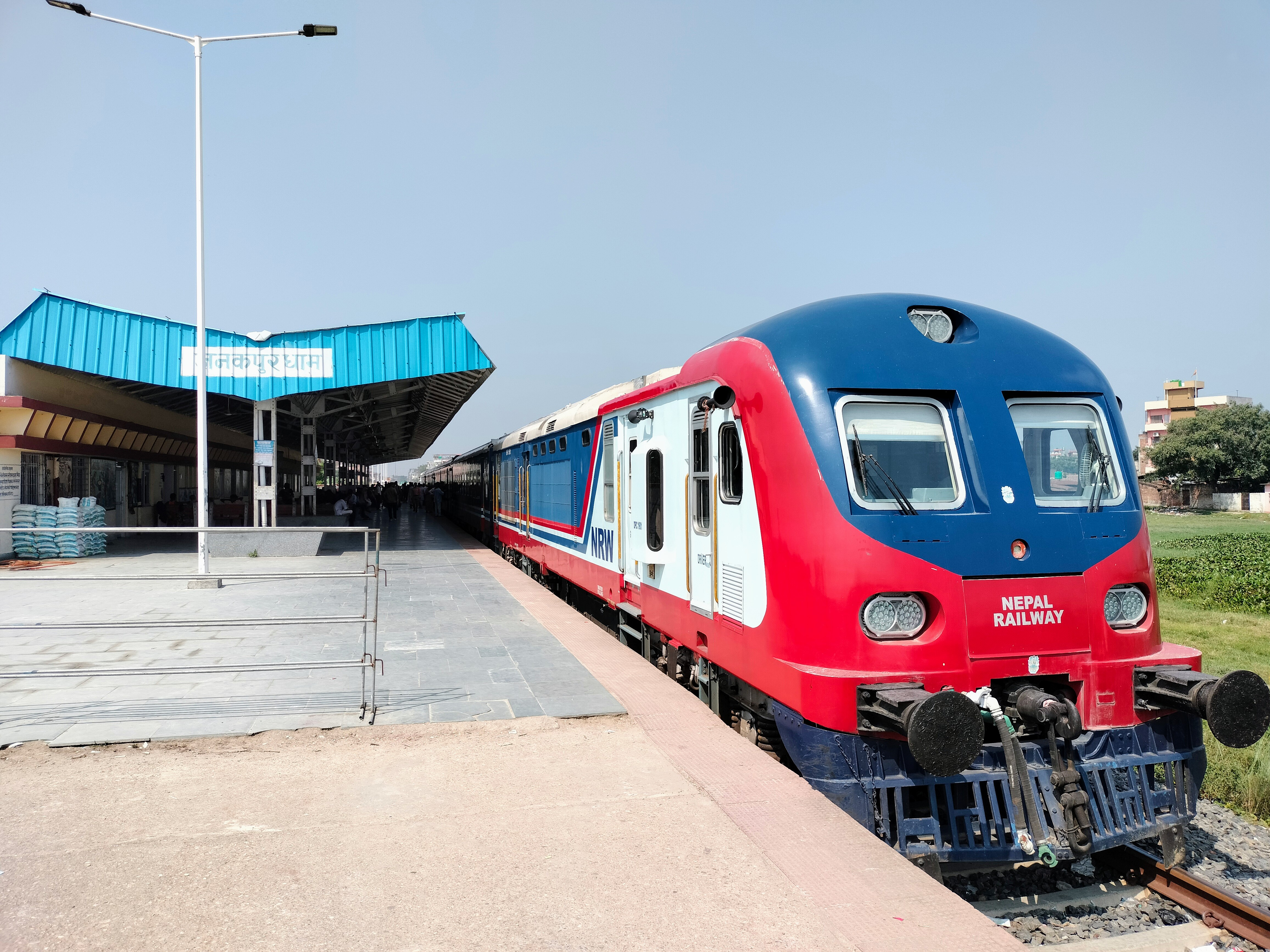
- A Nepal Railway train at Janakpurdham Railway Station

Department overview
- Formed: 15 June 2011
- Type: Rail transport
- Jurisdiction: Government of Nepal
- Status: Active
- Headquarters: Bishalnagar, Kathmandu, Nepal; 27.720°N 85.335°E
- Annual budget: NRs 3.344 Billion (FY 2081/82)
- Director General responsible: Hari Kumar Pokharel
- Parent department: Ministry of Infrastructure Development
- Child Department: Nepal Railway
- Website: http://dorw.gov.np

Department of Railways under Ministry of Infrastructure Development is the authority to develop, maintain and plan railways in Nepal. It has its headquarter at Bishalnagar, Kathmandu. Currently it maintains three in-operation railway lines in the country: Raxaul–Sirsiya, Jainagar–Bhangaha and Bathnaha-Budhnagar. It is equivalent to Department of Road for road infrastructure. It has several lines planned.

== History ==
Birgunj was the first town to witness railway service in 1923 followed by Janakpur and Dharan. These were the lines before an integrated railway development body like Department of Railways was formed. All lines were separated to each other and two met their demise before ever getting connected. Among which Janakpur line is the only surviving railway line in the country today. Necessary for an all rail lines overseeing body as well as a permanent organization structure to help in policy formulation, development and expansion of railway infrastructure and provide suggestions on railway services operation was felt in 2007 then subsequently the Department of Railways under the Ministry of Physical Infrastructure and Transport was formed in 2011.

=== Raxaul Amlekhgunj Railway line ===
The first railway in Nepal was the Nepal Government Railway (NGR), a 2 ft 6 in (762 mm) narrow gauge railway, built by the British in 1927, during the Rana period. The railway connected Raxaul in British India with Amlekhganj in the Kingdom of Nepal. This 39-kilometre-long (24 mi) line allowed people from different areas of the country to reach Amlekhganj, and helped move heavy vehicles to Bhimphedi. It was then possible to reach Kathmandu from Bhimphedi on horse or on foot. The railway possessed seven steam locomotives, 12 coaches and 82 wagons. It operated steam-powered Garratt locomotives manufactured by Beyer, Peacock & Company of England. The Raxaul–Amlekhganj railway track was operational until 1965. It was closed down after opening of the Tribhuvan Highway. The railway track from Raxaul was converted to 5 ft 6 in (1,676 mm) broad gauge in early 2000 to connect Sirsiya (Birganj) Inland Container Depot (ICD). The railway became fully operational in 2005, though certain segments were used as early as 2002. It is used to move containers and other cargo to and from the Kolkata port and other places in India. It is the most important entry point for imports into China, and is essential for Nepal's commerce and trade. Birganj is located 700 km (430 mi) from the Kolkata port by railway.

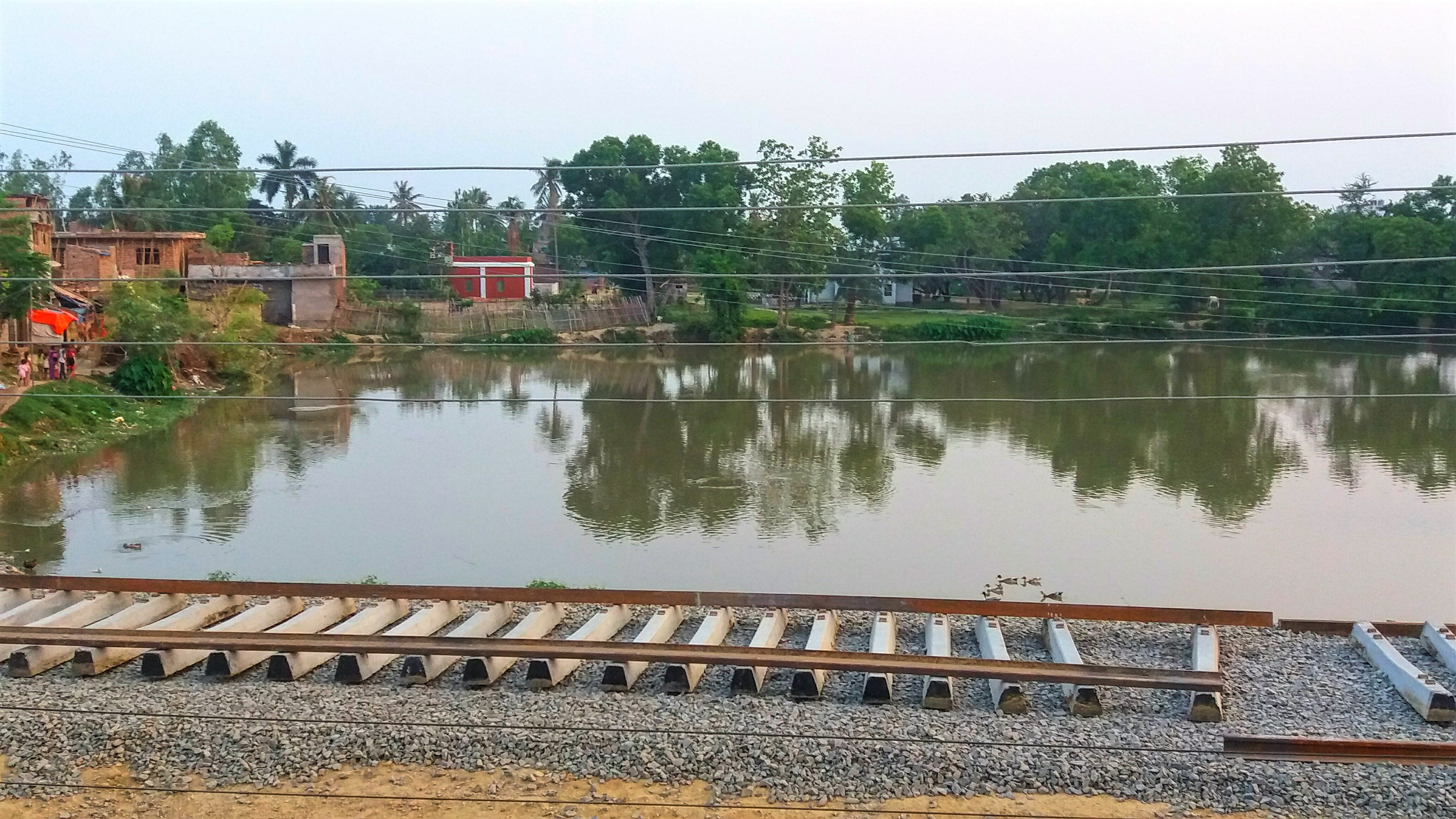
Track upgradation on Janakpur Jaynagar line.

=== Janakpur Jaynagar Railway line ===
The second railway in the country was the Nepal Janakpur–Jainagar Railway (NJJR), a 2 ft 6 in (762 mm) narrow gauge railway, built by the British in 1937, during the Rana period. This 28-mile-long (45 km) track was built to carry timber from the then heavily forested areas of Janakpur in the Kingdom of Nepal to Jainagar in British India. The railway was later extended to Bijalpura.After a washout of the railway embankment and two bridges, the track between Janakpur and Bijayalpura (22 km railway line) was closed in 2001 then only the reaming section was in operation. The remaining Janakpur–Jainagar railway track was converted to 5 ft 6 in (1,676 mm) broad gauge in 2018. The extension to Bardibas remains under construction.

=== Koshi Railway line ===
The Koshi Railway was built in 1957 to carry stones and gravels near from Dharan and Chatara to the construction site of Koshi Barrage. The rail line was linked with Birpur and Bhimnagar in India. The material and machineries for the Koshi Barrage site used to import from this route from Bathnaha, which was also connected with Jogbani.

== Existing railway lines ==
Currently there are 3 operational railway lines in the country all of which connect Nepal to India:

- Dual-use passenger-cum-freight lines:
  - Jaynagar–Bardibas railway line: Out of its 68.7 km (42.7 mi) total line length from Jainagar, India to Bardibas, Nepal, currently trains are running on 52 km up to Bhangaha and is used primarily for passenger transport. This is the only passenger transport railway line in Nepal. It runs from Bhangaha to Siraha at the Nepal-India border and further goes to the Indian town of Jainagar, Bihar. Nepal Railway operates passenger train service on it. In this line Bhangaha to Bardibas section has been left to be constructed. In the Jaynagar–Bhangaha (52 km) section now trains are running on a regular basis.
- Freight only lines:
  - Bathnaha–Biratnagar railway line: Freight transportation up to Budhnagar commenced. The eight-kilometre route from Bathnaha to the Integrated Check Post in Biratnagar was tested for operations in October, 2018.
  - Raxaul–Sirsiya railway line: This is a 6 km (3.7 mi) line from Raxaul, India to Sirsiya Inland Container Depot (or dry port) near Birganj, Nepal, and is primarily used for freight transport. It allows container traffic to be imported to Nepal through the Sirsiya dry port container depot.

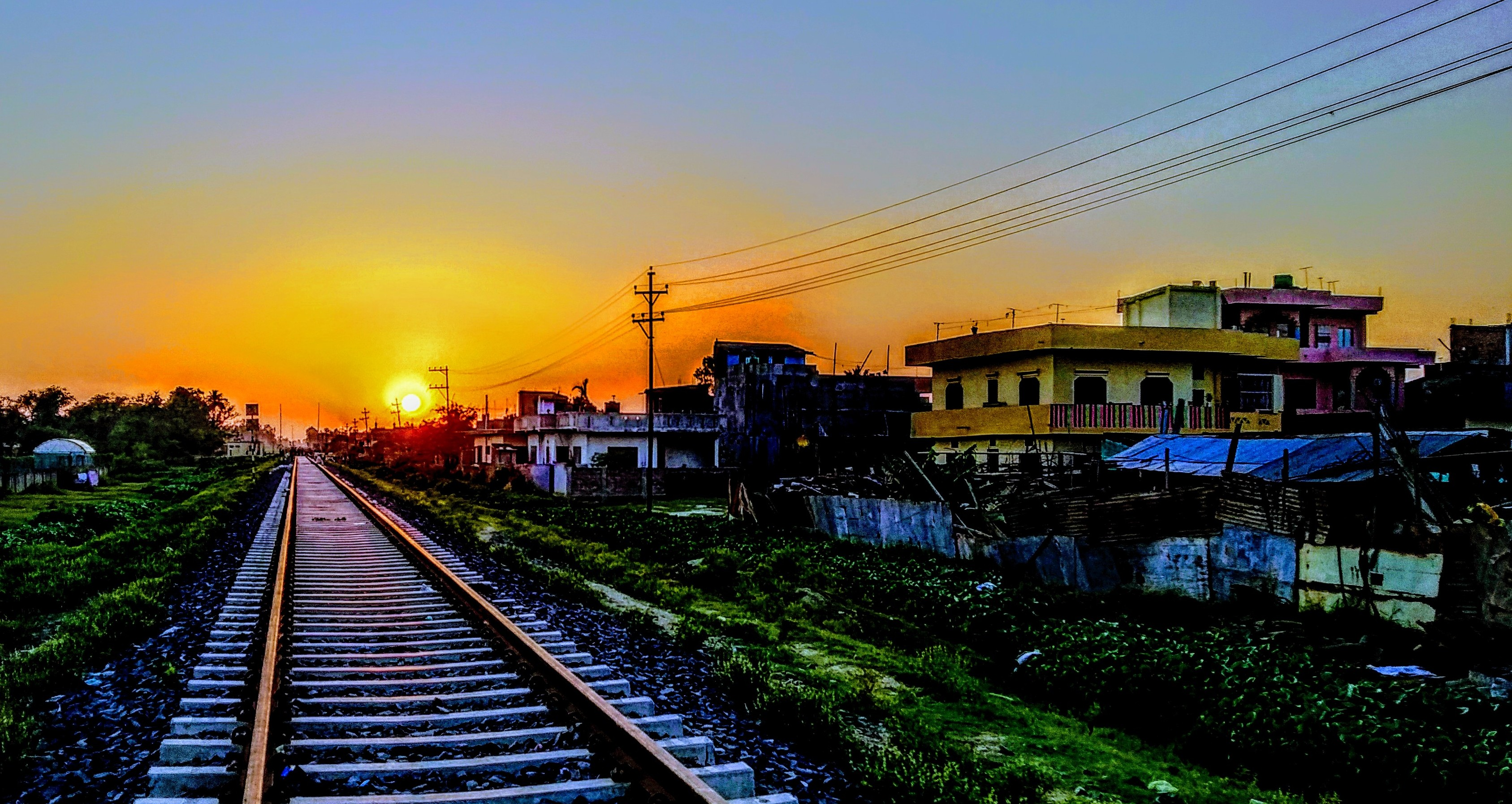
Jaynagar Bardibas line near Janakpur

== Planned railway lines ==
Railway Department has following lines under planned railways to be develop in future.

=== Within Nepal ===
- Anbu Khaireni-Bharatpur - The feasibility study has done and railway will be constructed to link Kathmandu and Pokhara with the Mechi-Mahakali or the East-West Railway.
- East-West Railway or Mechi-Mahakali Railway: The railway feasibility study has been done with total of 945.244 km (587.347 mi) which will expand through 24 districts in the total cost of $3 billion.
- Lumbini-Pokhara-Kathmandu: This will connect the popular tourist destination and adventurous city with the capital and the estimated cost is $3 billion.

=== China connectivity ===
- China–Nepal Railway Project between Kathmandu-Kerung: The railway will connect the capital city with China and the estimated cost is $2.75 billion. A 23-member technical and administrative team of National Railway Administration of China, led by its vice minister Zheng Jian, conducted a four-day overall study.

=== India connectivity ===
Listed west to east:

- Uttar Pradesh state
  - Rupaidiha, Nepalganj Road (India) – Nepalganj (Nepal)
  - Nautanwa (India) – Bhairahawa (Nepal)
- Bihar state
  - Raxaul–Birgunj-Kathmandu: Nepal and India agreed to construct a railway line linking Raxaul with Kathmandu during Prime Minister KP Oli Sharma's visit to India. A team of technical officers visited Kathmandu to study the proposed railway and they have stated that a feasibility study of the project would begin. They have already identified Chobhar as the terminus of the 113 km long railway line.
  - Bathnaha (India)- Jogbani (India) – Biratnagar (Nepal) Of the total 18.6 km or 11.6 mi length of Bathnaha–Biratnagar railway line, the 10 km (6.2 mi) of line construction has been completed and remaining 8.6 km is under construction as of April 2022.
  - Jainagar-Janakpur–Bijayalpura-Bardibas: The Jainagar–Janakpur line is being extended further to Bardibas from Janakpur.
- West Bengal state
  - New Jalpaiguri (India) – Kakarbhitta (Nepal)

== See also ==
- Department of Roads
- Department of Urban Development and Building Construction
- Department of Local Infrastructure
