= Inarwa railway station =

Railway station in Nepal

Inarwa

General information
- Location: Janaknandini, Dhanusha District, Madhesh Province; Nepal
- Coordinates: 26.6154°N 86.1408°E
- System: Nepal Railways
- Owner: Nepal Railways
- Operator: Nepal Railway company
- Line: Jaynagar–Bardibas railway line
- Platforms: 4

Construction
- Structure type: Standard (on-ground station)
- Parking: Yes
- Cycle facilities: Yes

Other information
- Status: Functioning
- Station code: NP-INRWA

History
- Opened: 1937; 89 years ago
- Closed: 2014
- Rebuilt: 2020

Services
Preceding station	Nepal Railway	Following station
Jaynagar, India Terminus	Jaynagar–Bardibas	Khajuri towards Bhangaha
Location
- Location within Madhesh Province Location within Nepal

Inarwa railway station (NP-INRWA) is a station located on the Jaynagar-Kurtha-Bardibas Rail Line project in Nepal. The station falls within Janaknandini Rural Municipality of Dhanusha District in Madhesh Province. As Inarwa is the first railway station on this route, a customs checkpoint has been built at the station. The station has four platforms. The preceding station is Jaynagar railway station, which is just 3 km away. The following station is Khajuri railway station, which is 4 km away.

== Services ==
There are total six services a day on Inarwa train station. Following is the station's newly revised time table.

Time Table
From	Inarwa		To
From	Arrivals	Departure	To
➡️Jaynagar	08:38 AM	08:40 AM	➡️Janakpur
➡️Bhangaha	09:50 AM	09:52 AM	➡️ Jaynagar
➡️Janakpur	12:35 PM	12:37 PM	➡️Jaynagar
➡️Jaynagar	15:08 PM	15:10 PM	➡️Janakpur
➡️Janakpur	17:35 PM	17:37 PM	➡️Jaynagar
➡️Jaynagar	18:08 PM	18:10 PM	➡️Bhangaha
