= List of railway stations in Nepal =

This is the list of railway stations in Nepal.

== Railway stations ==
- (Nepal) Inarwa
- (Nepal) Khajuri
- (Nepal) Mahinathpur
- (Nepal) Sahib Sarojnagar, Duhabi
- (Nepal) Baidehi, Itaharwa
- (Nepal) Deuri Parbaha
- (Nepal) Janakpur Dham
- (Nepal) Bijalpura, closed.
- (Nepal) Bardibas, under construction.
- (Nepal) Budhanagar, under construction.

== See also ==
- Nepal Railways
- Transport in Nepal
