= Transport in Nepal =

Transportation networks and infrastructure in Nepal

Transportation in Nepal has developed under significant geographical constraints due to the country's mountainous terrain and landlocked position. Modern transport systems began in the early 20th century, with roads becoming the primary mode of transportation, complemented by limited rail connections, air transport, ropeways, and inland dry ports.

== Road ==
The Government of Nepal has also established many organisations and offices to construct and maintain the roads inside and outside the Kathmandu Valley.

Organisations responsible for road construction and maintenance in Nepal
Office	Work
Batokaj Goswara	Construction and maintenance of roads inside Kathmandu
Banaune Adda	Construction and maintenance of roads outside Kathmandu
Samajung Company	Repairs of roads inside Kathmandu valley
Naya Batokaj Adda	Construction of new roads outside Kathmandu

The first highway, the Tribhuvan Highway was constructed in November 1952 between Kathmandu and Amlekhganj. The first vehicles run on this road were jeeps by Queen Kanti Rajyalaxmi in December 1953, on the fifth day of her marriage. Trucks could not use this road until after 1955.

The Statistics of National Highway SNH-2020/21 and Provincial Transport Master Plan (PTMP) guidelines clears that the authority of the National Highway of Nepal resides with the central government and that the other roads has been handed over to provincial governments and local governments.

Administration of roads in Nepal
#	Government	Administrative body	Coordination with	Type
1	Federal government	Department of Roads (under MoPIT)		National Highway
2	Provincial government	TID or IDD or IDO (under MoPID)	DoLI	Provincial Highway
3	Local government	Municipal government	DoLI	Urban/rural road

Road transport is the country's primary transportation mode. The Economic Survey 2022-23 released by the Ministry of Finance (Nepal), shows that the country had a total road network of national road length of 34,100 km; that only included roads constructed and maintained by the Department of Roads (DoR). This only included the national highway system

Road System Classification
Type	Description	Average speed limit
NH	National Highways are the major highways connecting Eastern Nepal with Western Nepal, and Southern Nepal with Northern. They are designated by the letters 'NH' followed by a two-digit number.	80 km/h
PH	Provincial Highways are the highways under provincial governments that run inside the respective provinces. They are designated by the letters 'PH' followed by two letters to designate the Province and then a three-digit number.	60 km/h
U/R	Urban/Rural roads are roads that reside within the municipality or rural municipality intended to serve within a specific metro, sub-metro, municipality or rural-municipality.	40 km/h

=== National Highways ===
- Total: 11,178.92 km
- Paved: 6,836.45 km
- Gravel: 1,116.36 km
- Unpaved: 3,226.12 km (2021 est.)

== Rail ==
The Nepal Government Railway had operated a short narrow gauge railway, from 1927 to 1965. As of 2022, there are two operational railway lines in the country, both of which connect Nepal with India: the Raxaul–Sirsiya and the Jainagar–Janakpur. The former is a 6 km (3.7 mi) line from Raxaul, India to Sirsiya Inland Container Depot (a dry port) near Birgunj, Nepal, and is primarily used for freight transport. The latter is a 51 km (32 mi) line from Jaynagar, India to Janakpur, Nepal, and is used primarily for passenger transport.

Nepal and India agreed to construct 8 different India–Nepal cross-border rail lines, including the line linking Raxaul with Kathmandu, during Prime Minister K.P. Oli's visit to India. A team of technical officers visited Kathmandu to study the proposed railway from Raxaul to Kathmandu and have stated that a feasibility study of the project would begin. They have already identified Chobhar as the terminus of the 113 km-long line.

The China–Nepal railway is a planned line through Kathmandu, linking the Indian Subcontinent with Lhasa in Tibet. It was proposed by the K.P. Oli government and in November 2017, Chinese media reported the arrival of a delegation of Chinese railway experts in Nepal. They discussed the possibility of a rail connection between China and Nepal. In August 2018, the two sides reached an agreement on construction details of the railway.

== Air ==
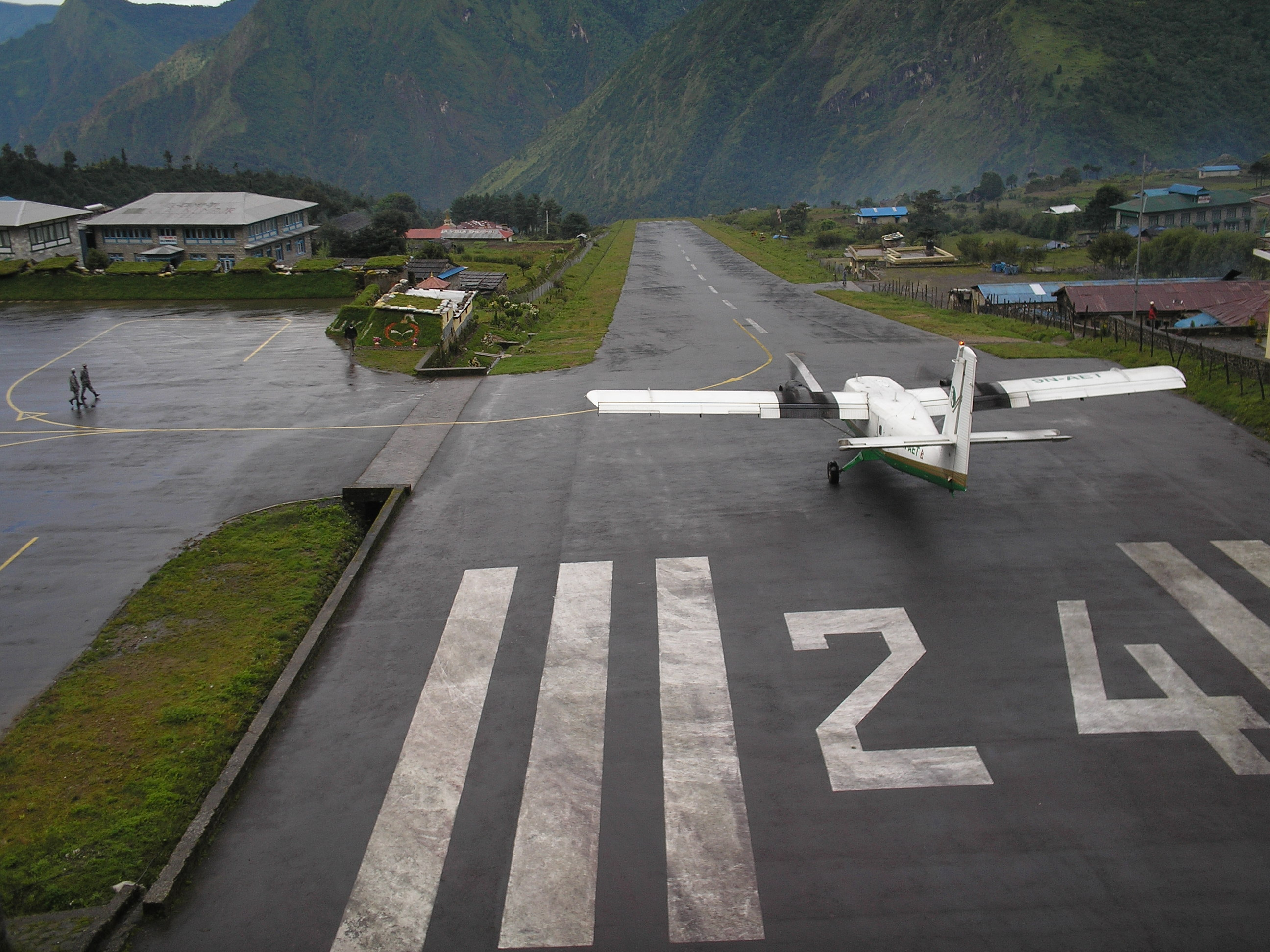
An aircraft departing from Tenzing-Hillary airport in Lukla

There are 53 airports in Nepal as of 2020 out of which 34 are in operation. There are three international airports that serve as aviation hubs: The Tribhuvan International Airport in Kathmandu, The Gautam Buddha International Airport in Lumbini, and The Pokhara International Airport in Pokhara.

Type		Paved runways	Unpaved runways
Under 914 m	(3000 feet)	31	1
914–1,523 m	(3000–5000 feet)	7	1
1,524–2,437 m	(5000–8000 feet)	1	0
2,437–3,047 m	(8000–10,000 feet)	0	0
Over 3,047 m	(over 10,000 feet)	1	0
Total		40	2

== Ropeways ==
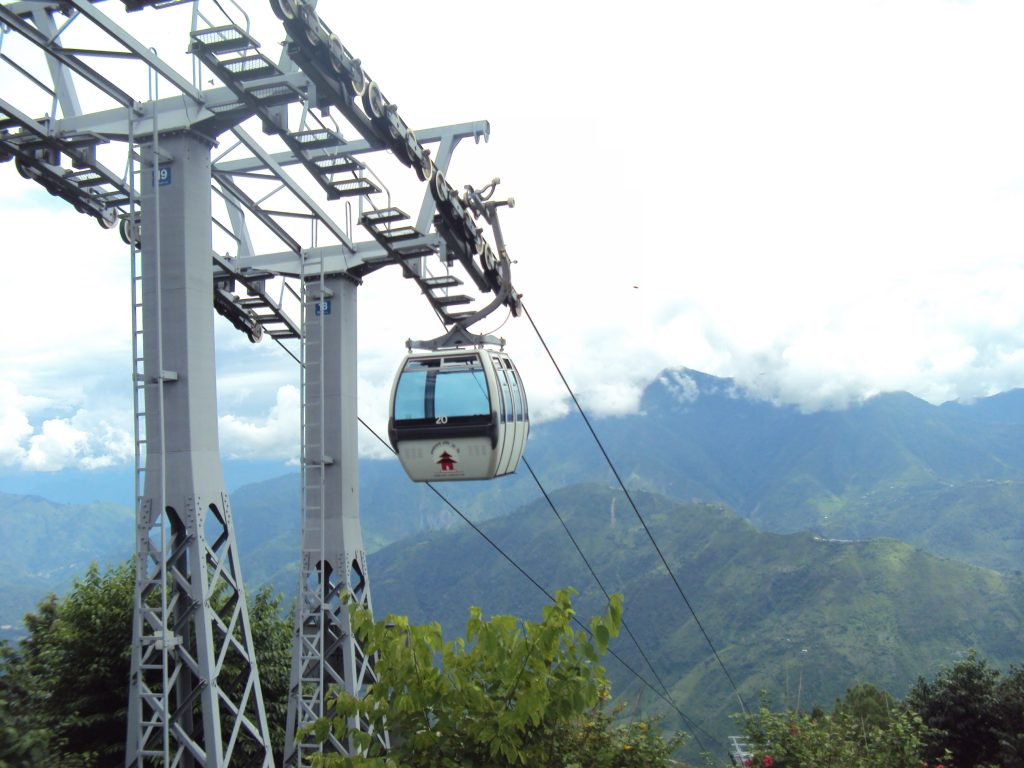
Cable Car in Manakamana

The first ropeway to carry cargo was the Halchowk-Lainchour ropeway which was used to transport stones from the quarry to build palaces. The famous Dhorsing-Chisapnai-Chandragiri ropeway passing into Kathmandu was built by Chandra Shamser Rana in 1922. It was upgraded in 1964 to reach to Hetauda with a total length of 42 km with technical and financial assistance from USAID. Following are the types of ropeways based on the operation mechanism and types of transport.

=== Tar Pul or Ghirlings ===
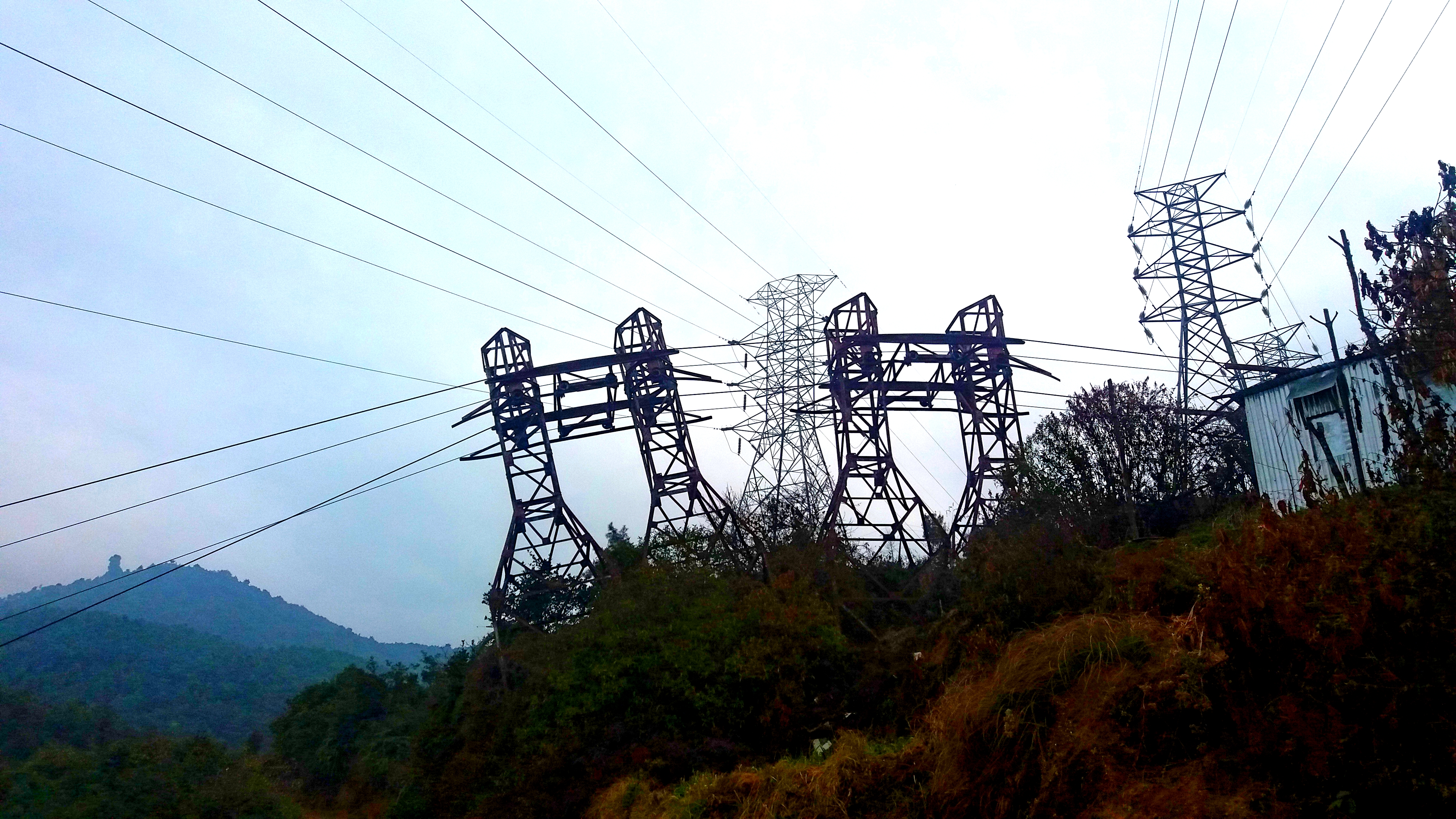
Kathmandu-Hetauda Cargo Ropeway

Also known as twin, these are rudimentary ropeways used in lieu of bridges to cross rivers. These are generally installed by the local community based on necessity. As of May 2004, there are 25 Tar Pul in Kavre, Gorkha, Myagdi, Udaypur, Chitwan and Lamjung

=== Gravity Ropeways ===
A gravity ropeway operates by using potential energy with mechanical power. A weight lowered from a higher elevation lifts the cargo. Ropeways of this type were first used in Mustang to transport apples. Since then they have been installed in four other locations: Gorkha, Tanahun, Kalikot and Achham.

Most of the construction ropeways fall in this category.

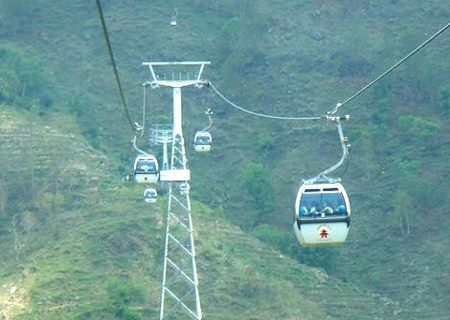
Manakamana Passenger Ropeway

=== Cargo Ropeways ===
Cargo ropeways are used in Nepal to transport goods from one place to another. The first ropeway, Halchowk-Lainchour, was in fact a cargo ropeway. The most famous cargo ropeway was the Kathmandu-Hetauda Ropeway, which is now out of operation.

=== Passenger ropeways ===
Mostly electrically operated, these kinds of ropeways or Cable Cars are used by passengers. The first of this kind was Manakamana Cable Car, established in 1998.

== Water ==
Nepal is a landlocked country that does not have any territory connected to an ocean.

Nepal's three dry ports are Birgunj, Biratnagar, and Bhairahawa.
