= Deuri Parbaha =

Deuri Parbaha देउरी प्रभा
- Village development committee
- Location in Nepal
- Coordinates: 26.70°N 85.99°E
- Country: Nepal
- Zone: Janakpur Zone
- District: Dhanusa District

Population (2001)
  - Total: 4,512
- Time zone: UTC+5:45 (Nepal Time)

Deuri Parbaha (also: Perbaha) is a village development committee in Dhanusa District in the Janakpur Zone of south-eastern Nepal. At the time of the 1991 Nepal census it had a population of 3,633 persons living in 652 individual households.

== Transport ==
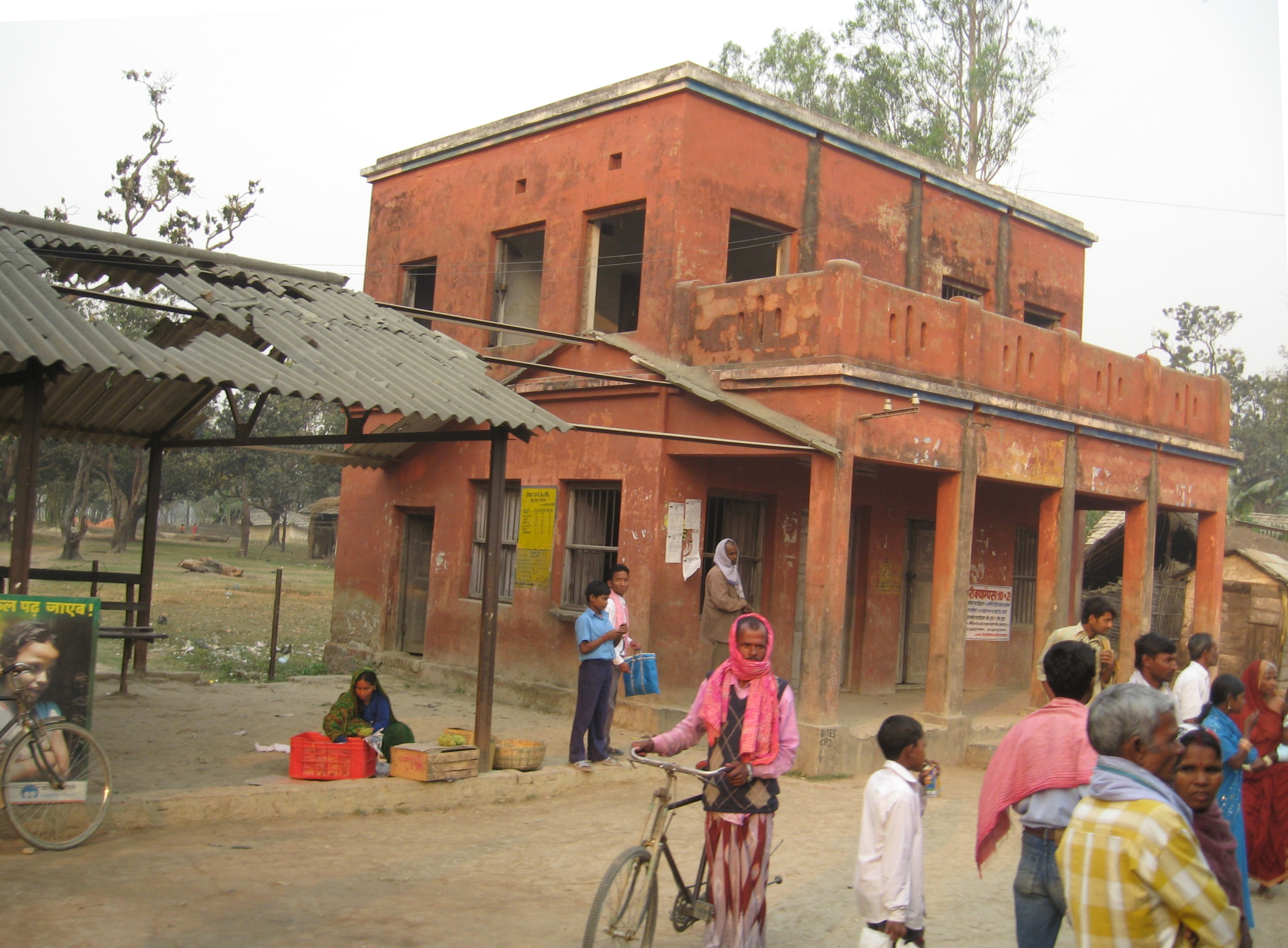
Old train station building at Perbaha.

Deuri Parbaha is served by Perbaha railway station where Nepal Railways runs its service.
