= Jaynagar–Bardibas railway line =

Jaynagar–Janakpur–Kurtha-Bardibas railway
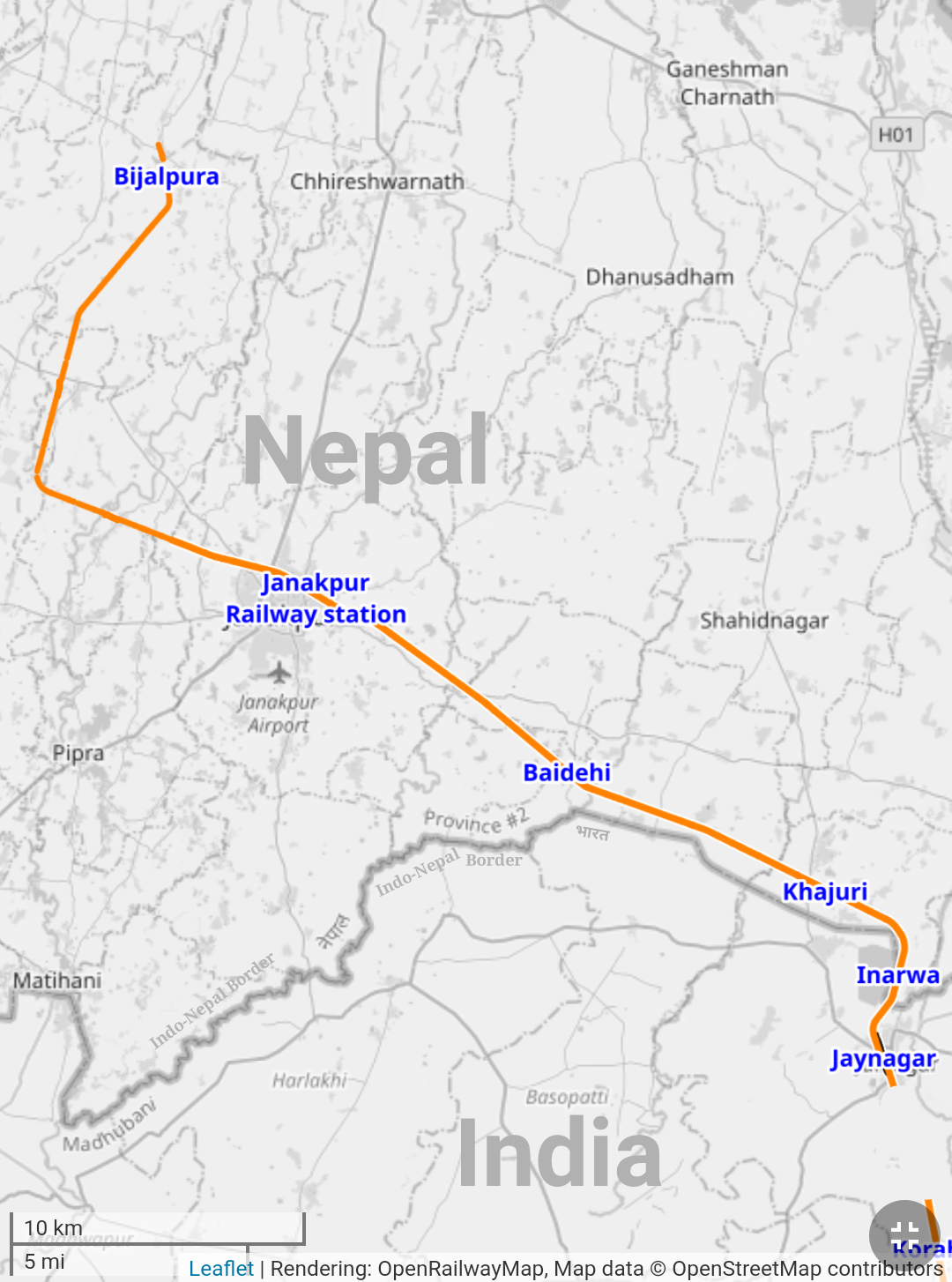

Overview
- Other name: Bardibas - Jayanagar line
- Native name: बर्दिबास जयनगर कुर्था मार्ग
- Status: Operating
- Locale: Indian state of Bihar and Nepalese province of Madhesh Province
- Termini: Bhangaha, (Mahottari District, Nepal); Jaynagar, (Madhubani district, India)
- Stations: Inarwa, Khajuri, Baidehi, Parbaha, Janakpur, Kurtha, Khutta Pipradhi, Loharpatti, Singyahi, Bhangaha

Service
- Type: Diesel Electric Multiple Unit (DEMU)
- System: Indian Railway & Nepal Railway
- Services: Bhangaha-Kurtha-Janakpur-Jayanagar

History
- Opened: 1937; 89 years ago
- Upgradation: 2014 - 2019
- Reopened: 2022
- Inaugurated by: Sher Bahadur Deuba (As PM of Nepal); Narendra Modi (As PM of India)

Technical
- Line length: 68.7 km (42.7 mi)(currently 52 km is operational)
- Track gauge: 5 ft 6 in (1,676 mm)
- Electrification: No, Planned in future
- Operating speed: 69 mph (111 km/h)up to 120 km/h

The Jaynagar–Janakpur–Bardibas railway line (Hindi/ Nepali: जयनगर–जनकपुर–बर्दिबास रेलवे) is a cross-border railway line between India and Nepal. The railway links Bijalpura with Jaynagar, crossing the India–Nepal border near Inarwa. An extension to Bardibas is being constructed. The line began as a 2 ft 6 in (762 mm) freight railway in 1937, and subsequently became a passenger railway. It closed in 2014 to allow it to be converted to 5 ft 6 in (1,676 mm) broad gauge, and reopened in 2022. At that time it was the only operational passenger railway line in Nepal.

== Route ==
The railway begins at Jaynagar railway station, in the Madhubani district of India. The international border with Nepal is less than 3 kilometres (1.9 mi) from the terminus, but this does not affect passengers, as there are no border facilities or checkpoints at the crossing. The first station in Nepal is Inarwa railway station, a short distance after the border. There are customs checkpoints at both of these stations, but the border is maintained as an open border for people. In total, there are eight stations and six halts between Jaynagar and Bijalpura. There are also 15 major bridges and 127 smaller bridges, as well as 47 road crossings.

Stations between Jaynagar to Bijalpura:

- Jaynagar (India)
- Inarwan (Nepal)
- Khajuri (Halt)
- Baidehi
- Parbaha
- Janakpurdham
- Kurtha
- Khutta Pipradhi
- Loharpatti
- Singyahi
- Bhangaha (formerly Bijalpura)

The terminal station in Nepal was known as Bijalpura prior to that section closing in 2001, after monsoon rains destroyed a bridge and washed away some of the embankments. The new station is now called Bhangaha, although both names are still used by various sources. Details of how many stations there will be on the extension from Bhangaha to Bardibas had not been published in 2023.

One year after the new broad-gauge railway opened, Niranjan Kumar Jha, the General Manager of the Nepal Railway Company, said that despite uncertainty about how many people would use the line after it had been closed for almost a decade, the number of passengers was steadily increasing, the line was making a profit, and had provided a significant boost to the local economy.

== History ==
Following the construction of the Nepal Government Railway (NGR) in 1927, a 2 ft 6 in (762 mm) gauge cross-border line between Amalekhagunj, Nepal and Raxaul, India, the Nepal Janakpur Jaynagar Railway (NJJR) was the second railway line to be constructed in Nepal. It was also 2 ft 6 in (762 mm) gauge and opened in 1937, linking Bijalpura and Janakpur to Jaynagar in India. Initially it was used by Britishers to carry timber from the then heavily forested areas of Janakpur in the Kingdom of Nepal to Jainagar (India). When all the timber in the area had been cut down, the owners gave the railway to the Nepali Government, and the carrying of passengers began. Soon Nepalese villagers around Janakpur found it handy for commuting to their local town and going to India. Janakpur, revered as being the birth place of the goddess Sita, is a holy and popular pilgrimage destination for lots of travelers within Nepal and India. Large numbers of Indian visitors started to visit Janakpur using the railway, particularly at times of festival.

The railway continued beyond Janakpur to Bijalpura, but this section was only accessible in the dry season, and could not be used during the rainy season. By 1965, a start had been made on upgrading it to an all-weather line, but the work ceased because of uncertainty that the project would generate any extra traffic on the line. The section from Janakpur to Bijalpura was abandoned in 2001, after the bridge over the Bighi River was destroyed and some of the embankment was washed away.

A review of the railway in 1965 found that the line had carried very little freight once it had ceased to be used to transport timber. It noted that the railway had previously been under the control of the Transport Department in the Ministry of Public Works, Transport and Communication. The management were not particularly competent, and the paperwork required to move freight by rail was far too complicated, resulting in most potential customers not bothering. At the time, management had been transferred to the Nepal Transport Corporation, and there were hopes that this would lead to improvements in efficiency. The carriage of freight at the time was hampered by the fact that the Indian railway at Jaynagar was 1,000 mm (3 ft 3 3/8 in) gauge, and all goods therefore had to be transhipped at Jaynagar. The report noted that two new locomotives had been bought in 1962, and that for the relatively small cost of NRs 3 million, the line could be upgraded, including the provision of new rolling stock.

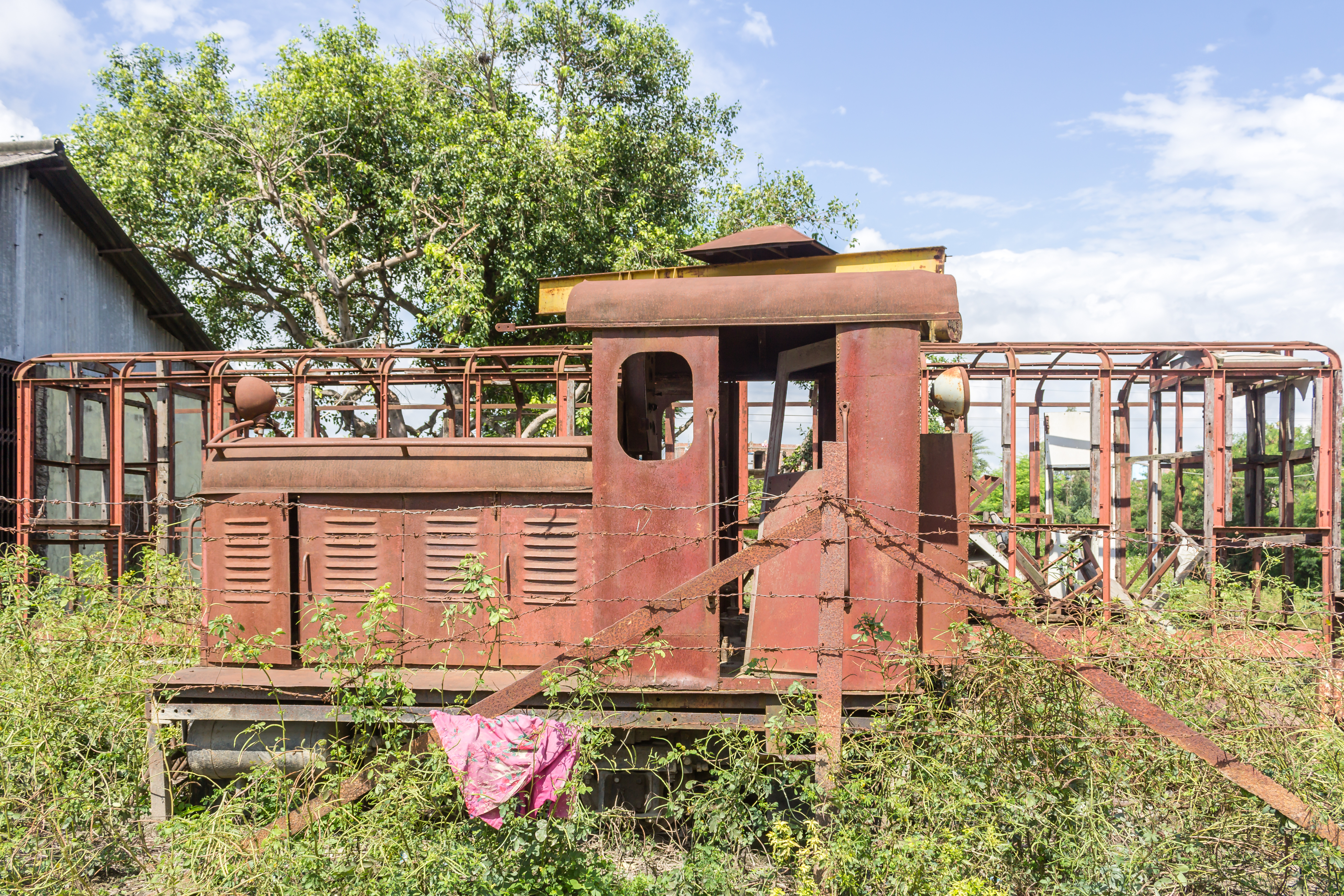
An abandoned narrow gauge NJJR engine at Janakpur

Trains were hauled by a mixed collection of steam locomotives until the mid 1990's, when the Indian government gave four diesel locomotives to the railway. However, one of the steam locomotives was retained in working order until at least 2005. In 1965, experts concluded that the railway had never been well-maintained, and that the condition of the rolling stock and track was "fair-to-poor". The British Broadcasting Company produced a programme about the railway in 2014, which showed that conditions were worse. With no funding from central government, the track and rolling stock were dilapidated. Trains frequently derailed, but were usually put back on the track with help from the passengers, and only one of the four diesel locomotives was operational, but often broke down. Despite not having been paid for over three months, the staff continued to operate the line, repairing the locomotive when required and attempting to obtain fuel for it. Although it was a lifeline for the communities at Janakpur and along the line, the train service ceased in 2014 so that the line could be converted to broad gauge.

=== Conversion to broad gauge ===
The Darbhanga to Jaynagar was converted to broad gauge in 2007, with new trains running from same year. Three years later, a memorandum of understanding was issued by the governments of Nepal and India, which would see India's Ministry of Railways rebuilding the line from Jaynagar to Janakpur and beyond, as the first of several cross-border broad gauge links between the two countries. Accordingly, the narrow gauge service ceased in March 2014, to allow the work to start. Construction started when Nepali Congress leader Bimalendra Nidhi was Minister for Physical Infrastructure and Transport in the Sushil Koirala cabinet.

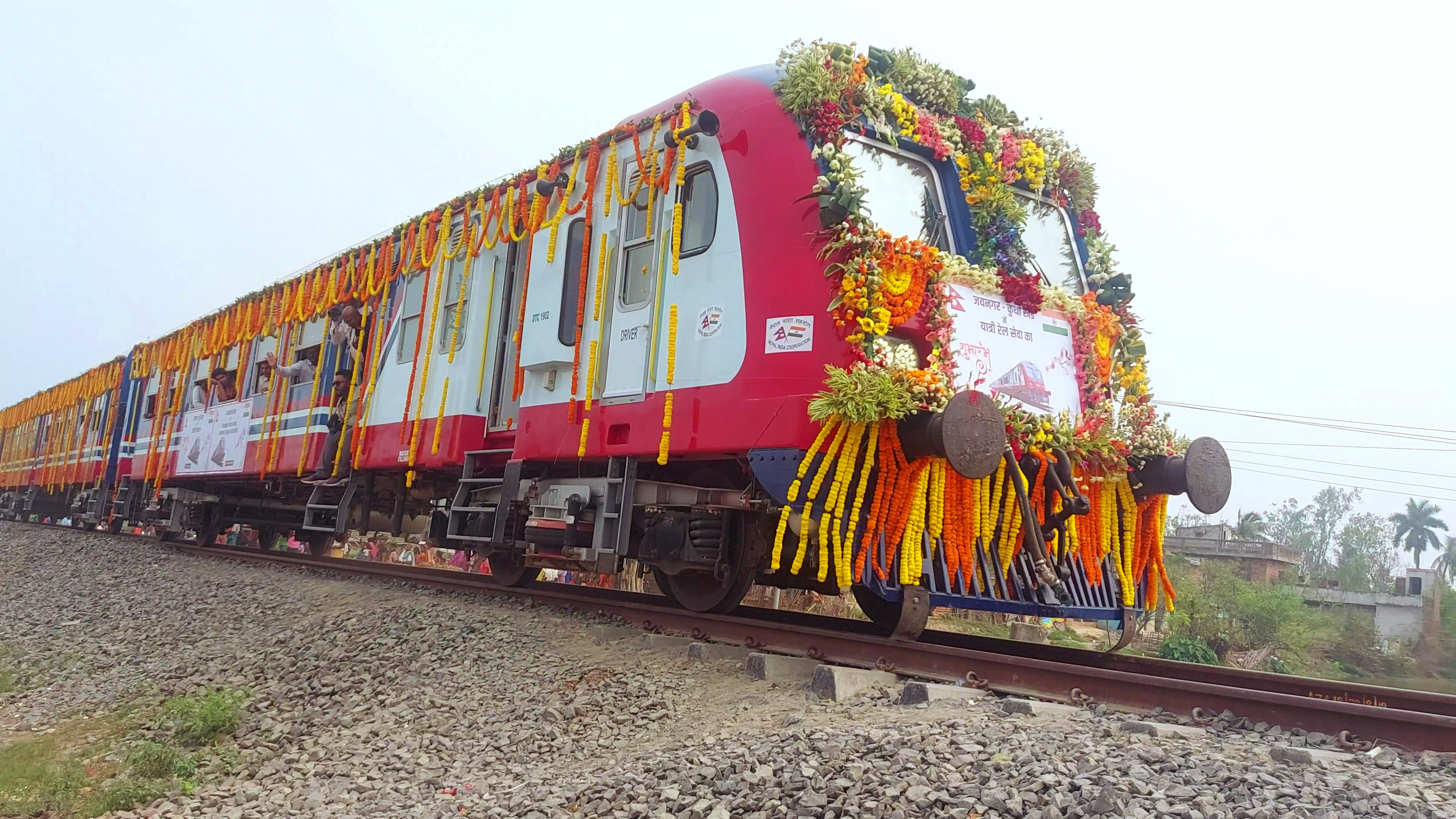
A Nepal Railway train on its inaugural run after the rail line's conversion to broad gauge.

The job of rebuilding the tracks and stations was awarded to Ircon International, and was funded by a grant of NPR 8.77 billion from the Indian Government. The project was split into three sections, with the first running from Jaynagar to Janakpur and Kurtha, beyond which the formation was washed away in 2001. This section is 35 kilometres (22 mi) long, and was completed in 2019, but the train service did not start until 2022. The next 17 kilometres (11 mi) from Kurtha to Bijalpura, the original terminus prior to 2001, was completed by April 2023. Construction of the final 17 kilometres (11 mi) from Bijalpura to Bardibas was dependant on the Nepalese government making the land available.

The Nepal Rail Company (NRC) is responsible for operating the trains and maintaining them. They bought two 5-car diesel-electric multiple units from the Integral Coach Factory in Chennai, paid for by the Nepali government. NRC have an operation and maintenance support contract with the Konkan Railway Corporation, while Indian Railways are training staff and providing other expertise. Trial running on the new railway took place in July 2021, and both countries signed a "standard operating procedure" on 6 October 2021, which covers the operation of both passenger and freight trains on the line. In December 2021 the Indian Commissioner of Railway Safety approved the 3-kilometre (1.9 mi) section from Jaynagar to the border, after which the new railway was handed over to the Nepali government.

The section from Jayanagar to Kurtha was officially inaugurated by Nepali Prime Minister Sher Bahadur Deuba and Indian Prime Minister Narendra Modi on 2 April 2022. It was fully operational for passenger service on 3 April 2022. The second section from Kurtha to Bijalpura was formally opened by Prakash Jwala, Nepal's Minister for Physical Infrastructure and Transport on 16 July 2023, during a visit to Janakpur. By late 2023, the government had resolved issues with the purchase of land for the third section, but progress was delayed until compensation payments for the land had been made. A survey of the new route began on 17 December 2023, and construction was scheduled to begin once that was completed. Construction was expected to take about three years. It is expected to boost industralization, religious and cultural tourism after completion.

== Rolling stock ==
As well as locomotives supplied directly to the Janakpur-Jaynagar railway, most of the stock from the Nepal Government Railway was transferred to the railway when the NGR closed in 1968. The following steam locomotives are known to have been active on the railway.

NGR No	Name	Builder	Type	Date	Works number	Notes
1	Pashupati	Hunslet	4-6-0T	1926	1536	Ex NGR
2	Guhyeshwari	Hunslet	4-6-0T	1926	1537	Ex NGR
3	Gorakhnath	Avonside	0-6-0T	1928	2016	Ex NGR
4	Mahibir	Beyer, Peacock & Company	2-6-2+2-6-2 Garratt	1932	6736	Ex NGR
	Rama	Orenstein & Koppel	2-6-2T	1936	12757	
	Seeta	Orenstein & Koppel	2-6-2T	1936	12758	
5	Krishna	Du Croo & Brauns	0-10-0T	1939	241	Ex NGR
6	Sitaram	Beyer Peacock & Company	2-6-2+2-6-2 Garratt	1947	7243	Ex NGR
7	Bishnu	Hunslet	0-6-2T	1949	3684	Ex NGR. Used for steam charters after dieselisation
	Surya	Hunslet	0-6-2T	1962	3875	
	Shree Chandra	Hunslet	0-6-2T	1962	3876	

In 1994, four class ZDM-5 diesel locomotives were sent to the railway from India. 41 of the type were built by the Chittaranjan Locomotive Works from 1989 onwards. They weighed 22 tonnes and were built for lines where the axle loading could not exceed 6 tonnes. They had a Bo-Bo wheel arrangement and the 490hp engine drove a hydraulic transmission system. Initially, two locomotives, ZDM-535 and ZDM-536, were supplied by Indian Railways, who also provided crews to operate them. Shortly afterwards, they were joined by ZDM-533 and ZDM-524. The railway also had two small diesel locomotives, manufactured by Arnold Jung Lokomotivfabrik of Germany for the Nepal Government Railway in 1960. After transfer, they were used on the Bijalpura extension.

In 2020, two new broad gauge 5-car diesel-electric multiple units were purchased from the Integral Coach Factory in Chennai. They are rated at 1,600hp, and each has one air-conditioned coach and four standard coaches. Each multiple unit has seating for 300 passengers, with additional room for another 700 standing passengers.

== See also ==
- Railway stations in Nepal
- Nepal railway
- Indian Railways
- Railway stations in India

== Bibliography ==
- Gallagher, John S; et al. (June 1965). "A National Transport System For Nepal" (PDF). International Bank for Reconstruction and Development.
