= Janakpurdham railway station =

Railway station in Nepal

Janakpurdham जनकपुरधाम
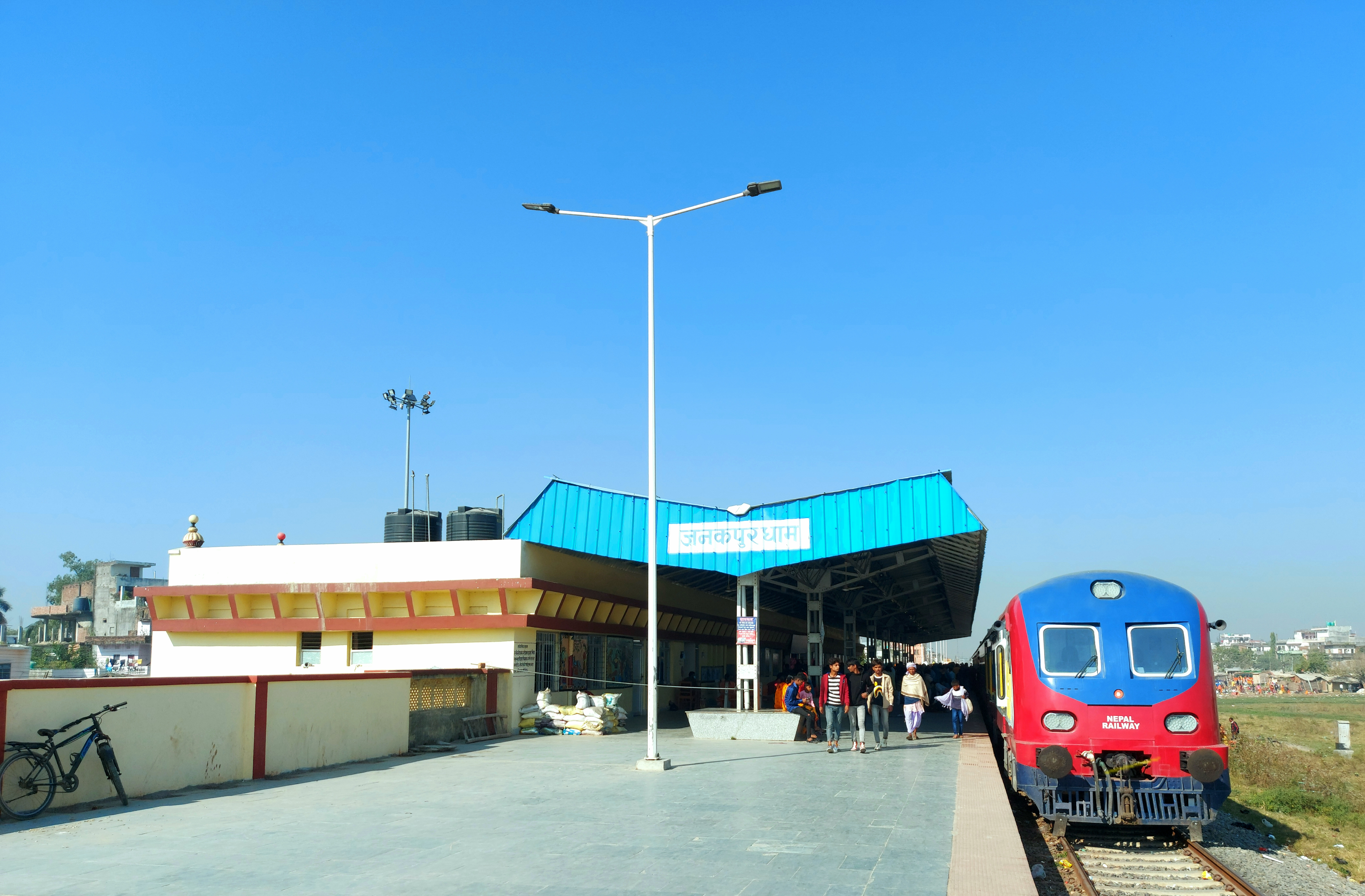
- Janakpurdham Railway Station

General information
- Location: Janakpur, Dhanusha District, Madhesh Province; Nepal
- Coordinates: 26.734°N 85.937°E
- Owner: Department of Railways
- Operator: Nepal Railway
- Line: Jaynagar–Bardibas railway line
- Platforms: 1
- Tracks: 3

Construction
- Structure type: Standard (on-ground station)
- Parking: Yes
- Cycle facilities: Yes

Other information
- Status: Functioning
- Station code: JNKPE

History
- Opened: 1937

Key dates
- 1936–1937: Construction
- 1937: Inauguration
- 2014-2019: Reconstruction

Services
| Preceding station | Nepal Railway | Following station |
|---|---|---|
| Parbaha towards Jaynagar, India | Jaynagar–Bardibas | Kurtha towards Bhangaha |
Location
- Location within Madhesh Province Location within Nepal

Janakpurdham Railway Station (JNKPE) is a railway station located in Dhanusha District, Madhesh province of Nepal. The station has single platform which is diesel-line operational. It was a narrow gauge station until 2014 since its construction in 1937. After reconstruction it resumed service in 2022. The station is a part of Jaynagar-Bijalpura-Bardibas rail section project.

== History ==
Janakpur was a freight station built in 1937 to move timber to Indian Railways during British India. When all the timber in the area had been cut, the station opened for passengers.

From 2014 to 2019 the Railway station went through conversion of railway tracks into broad gauge line, construction of new station. Services resumed at the station on 3 March 2022.

== Services ==
There are total six services a day on Janakpur train station: three departing services to Jaynagar, two terminus services from Jaynagar and only a departing service to Bhangaha. Following is the station's newly revised time table published by Nepal Railway on 2080/03/28 of Nepalese calendar (2023/07/13 AD).

Time Table
| From | Janakpur Dham | | To |
| From | Arrivals | Departure | To |
|---|---|---|---|
| ➡️Bhangaha | 08:30 AM | 08:35 AM | ➡️ Jaynagar |
| ➡️Jaynagar | 09:55 AM | | ➡️Janakpur |
| ➡️Janakpur | | 11:30 AM | ➡️Jaynagar |
| ➡️Jaynagar | 16:25 PM | | ➡️Janakpur |
| ➡️Janakpur | | 16:30 PM | ➡️Jaynagar |
| ➡️Jaynagar | 19:12 PM | 19:17 PM | ➡️Bhangaha |

== See also ==
- Janakpur–Jaynagar Railway
