= Bathnaha =

Bathnaha may refer to:

- Bathnaha, Janakpur, Nepal
- Bathnaha, Sagarmatha, Nepal
- Bathnaha, Araria, a village in Araria district, Bihar, India
- Bathnaha, Sitamarhi, Sitamarhi district, Bihar
- Bathnaha (Vidhan Sabha constituency), Sitamarhi district, Bihar
