= Nepal Railway Company Limited =

Rail transport company

Nepal Railway Company Ltd. नेपाल रेल्वे कम्पनी लिमिटेड
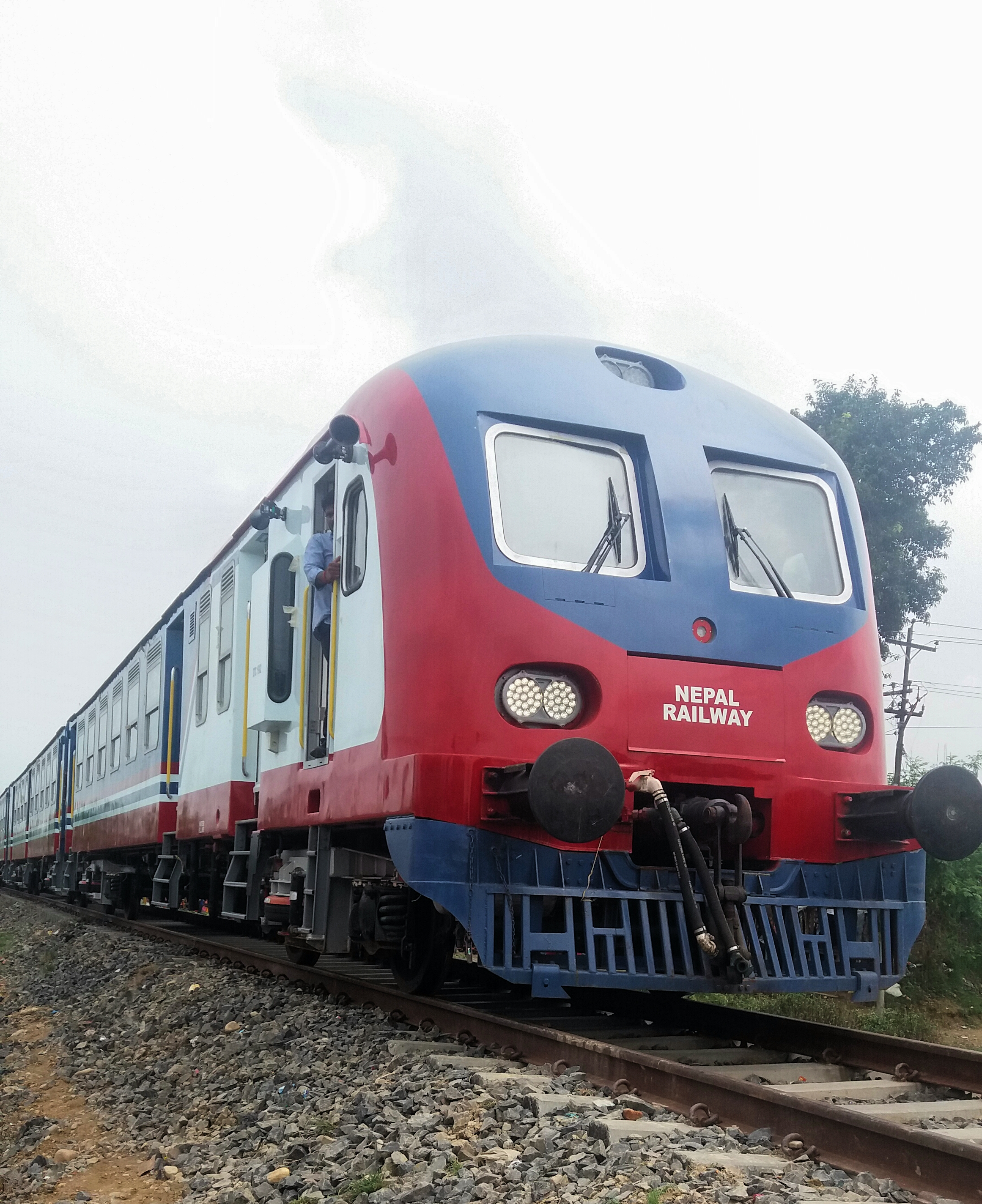
- A Nepal Railway train in service.
- Trade name: Nepal Railway
- Native name: नेपाल रेल्वे कम्पनी
- Type: Government sector
- Industry: Rail transport
- Predecessor: Nepal Government Railway and Nepal Janakpur–Jainagar Railway
- Founded: 1927; 99 years ago (original)
- Founder: Chandra Shumsher
- Headquarters: Janakpur, Nepal
- Area served: Nepal
- Key people: Redeyes (Director General); Niranjan Jha (CEO of Nepal Railway Company Limited)
- Owner: Government of Nepal
- Parent: Department of Railways
- Website: www.nepalrailway.gov.np

The Nepal Railway Company Ltd. (in short Nepal Railway, reporting mark: NRW / ने. रे) is a state-owned company under the Department of Railways (DORW) which operates passenger train services in Nepal. It is the only train service provider in the country. Currently it operates passenger transport services on the Jaynagar–Bardibas railway line, a 52 kilometres (32 mi) line from Jainagar, India to Bhangaha, Nepal.

== History ==
Before consolidating to the current stage, train service was started as Nepal Government Railway (NGR) then continued as Nepal Janakpur Jaynagar Railway (NJJR).The locomotives in the NGR era were solely powered by coal with steam engines, whereas the NJJR introduced diesel locomotives in 1993. Today's Nepal Railway is the revived form of Nepal Janakpur Jaynagar Railway (NJJR).

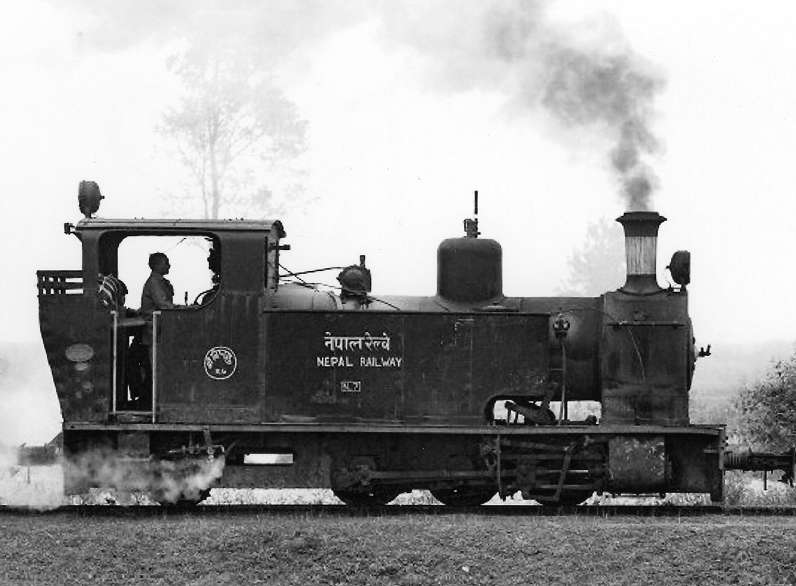
A Nepal Railway locomotive in 1927 during the reign of PM Chandra Shumsher Rana

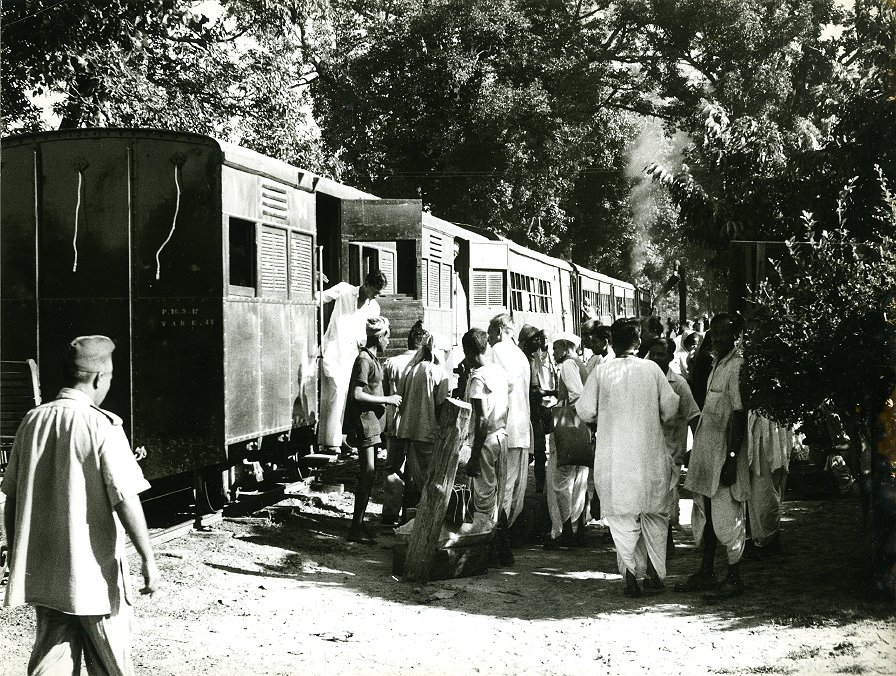
Nepal Railway in 1950s.

== Services ==
Currently the Nepal Railway operates passenger train services on Jaynagar–Bardibas railway line. It has plans to operate freight services on the Bathnaha–Biratnagar railway line soon. Passengers have two choices of cars, deluxe and general to ride on Nepal Railway's trains. As per General Manager of Nepal Railways Niranjan Jha, 1350 passengers can travel by train at a time.

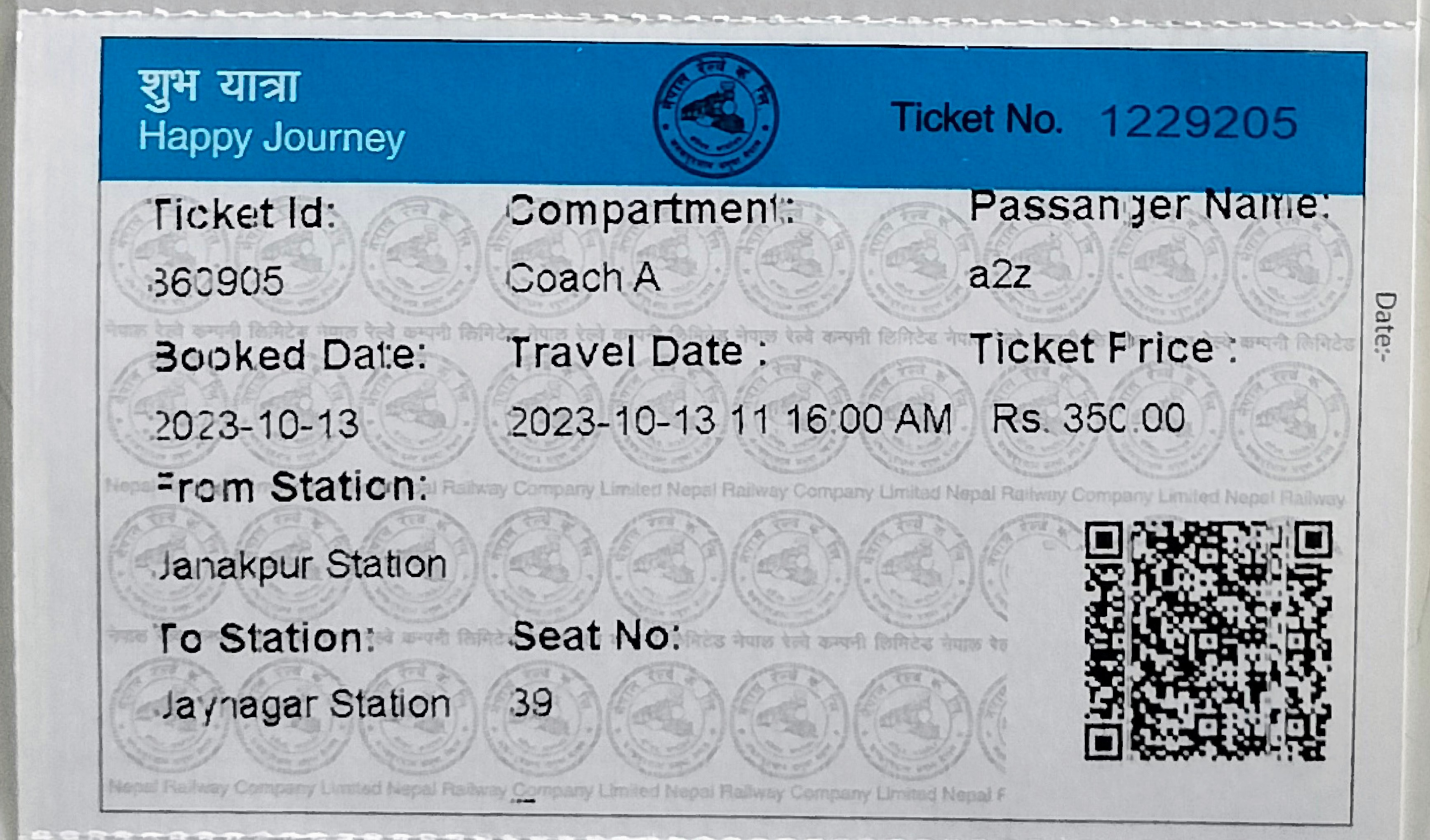
Nepal Railway Tickets, Janakpurdham (Nepal) to Jay Nagar (India) AC Compartment

=== Bathnaha–Biratnagar railway ===
Of the total 18.6 km or 11.6 mi length of Bathnaha–Biratnagar railway line, 10 km (6.2 mi) of the line has been constructed and the remaining 8.6 km is under construction as of April 2022.

=== Planned & under-construction railways ===
A total of 8 different India–Nepal cross-border rail lines have been proposed so far, some of which are complete and others are either under planning or under construction.

The China–Nepal Railway is a planned 72 km line which will link Kathmandu with Shigatse in Tibet, crossing the China–Nepal border at Gyirong–Rasuwa.

== Incidents ==
In August 2012, a serious incident occurred when a locomotive ran away without bogies while a driver was putting in oil. The locomotive ran from Jainagar to Janakpur at speeds far exceeding the restrictions on the line, resulting in the normally two-and-a-half hours journey of 29 km (18 mi) taking only 45 minutes. The staff at Janakpur diverted the locomotive engine onto a damaged track where its wheels became stuck in the ground and it came to a full stop without causing any injuries.

== See also ==
- List of railway lines in Nepal
- Department of Railways (Nepal)
- Railway stations in Nepal
- Transport in Nepal
- Railway stations in India
