= Bhangaha =

Bhangaha भँगाहा
- Municipality
- Location in Nepal
- Coordinates: 26.93°N 85.87°E
- Country: Nepal
- Development Region: Central
- Zone: Janakpur
- District: Mahottari District
- Province: Madhesh Province
- Established: 2016 A.D. (2073 B.S.)

Government
  - Mayor: Sanjeev Kumar Sah
  - Deputy Mayor: Ganga Devi Singh

Area
  - Total: 77.21 km^{2} (29.81 sq mi)

Population (2011)
  - Total: 46,754
  - Density: 605.5/km^{2} (1,568/sq mi)
  - Religions: Hindu Muslim Christian

Languages
  - Local: Maithili, Tharu, Nepali
- Time zone: UTC+5:45 (NST)
- Postal Code: 45700
- Area code: 044
- Website: http://www.bhagahamun.gov.np/

Bhangaha (Nepali: भँगाहा ) is a municipality in Mahottari District in Madhesh Province of Nepal. It was formed in 2016 occupying current 9 sections (wards) from previous 9 VDCs. It occupies an area of 77.21 km^{2} with a total population of 46,754.

Services at the Nepal Railway Company Limited station
- Preceding station	Nepal Railway	Following station
  Parbaha towards Jaynagar, India	Jaynagar–Bardibas	Terminus
  Parbaha towards Jaynagar, India	Jaynagar–Bardibas under construction	Bijayalpura towards Bardibas
