= Rupaidiha =

Town in Uttar Pradesh, India

- Village
- Location in Uttar Pradesh, India Rupaidiha (India)
- Coordinates: 28.0218°N 81.6021°E
- Country: India
- State: Uttar Pradesh
- District: Bahraich

Languages
  - Official: Hindi
- Time zone: UTC+5:30 (IST)
- Postal code: 271881
- Vehicle registration: UP
- Lok Sabha constituency: Bahraich
- Vidhan Sabha constituency: Nanpara
- Website: up.gov.in

Rupaidiha is a small town in Bahraich district in the Indian state of Uttar Pradesh, near the India–Nepal border across from Nepalgunj. The Rupaidiha border is a significant trade route, with annual trade worth Rs 8,500 crore between India and Nepal. Exports account for 95 per cent of the trade value, making the facility’s development an important move. Recently, Prime Minister Narendra Modi and his Nepalese counterpart Pushpa Kamal Dahal ‘Prachanda’ virtually inaugurated Uttar Pradesh’s first land port along the India-Nepal border at Rupaidiha.The construction of the Rupaidiha Land Port, built on 115 acres of land, has cost about Rs 200 crores. A 2.2 km long feeder route has also been constructed to link the two land ports to National Highway-927.

== Transport ==
A railway station named "Nepalganj Road" is on the Nepalgunj–Gonda route. Rupaidiha is on NH 927. Nepalese and Indian nationals may cross the border without restrictions. There is a customs checkpoint for goods and third country nationals. UPSRTC has started Bus services from Rupaidiha to New Delhi and Lucknow. A bus service for Hill Stations like Shimla, Haridwar, Dehradun and even Chandigarh is also available. Bahraich is the last district of India Connected to the Nepal Border. One can reach Nepal by Bus, Train, and personal cab, which is just 55 km from Bahraich through Rupaidha.
