= Amlekhganj =

Place in Nepal

Amlekhganj अमलेखगञ्ज
- Village Development Committee
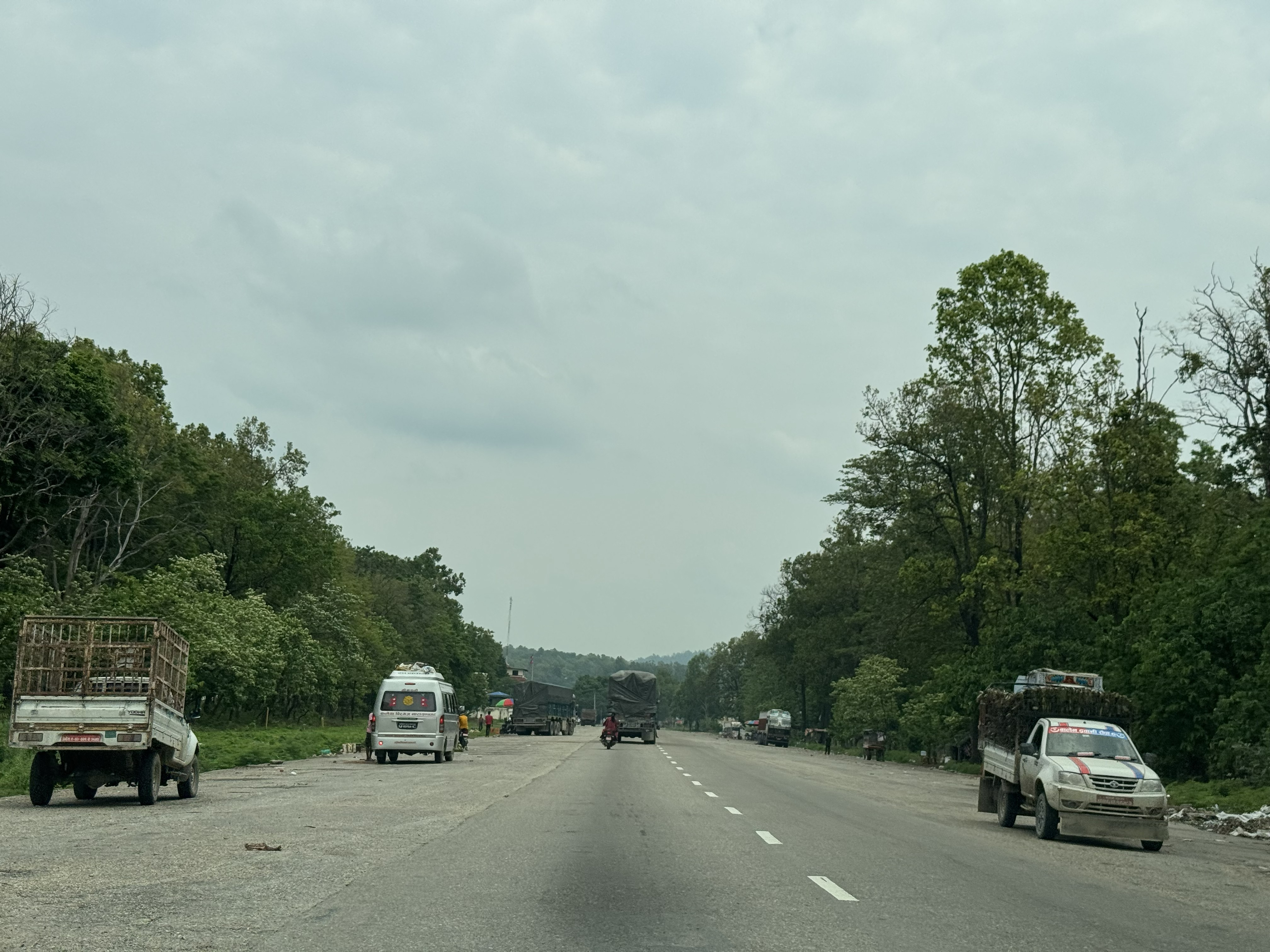
- Amlekhganj in 2025

- Location in Nepal
- Coordinates: 27°17′N 84°59′E
- Country: Nepal
- Zone: Narayani Zone
- District: Bara District

Population (2011)
  - Total: 6,709
- Time zone: UTC+5:45 (Nepal Time)

Amlekhganj (also Amlekhgunj; Nepali: अमलेखगंज) is a town and Village Development Committee (now Sub Metropolitan City) in Bara District in the Narayani Zone of south-eastern Nepal. At the time of the 2011 Nepal census it had a population of 6,709 people living in 1370 individual households. There were 3,413 males and 3,296 females at the time of census. At one time it was famed as the starting point of the Nepal Government Railway (NGR) which connected it with Raxaul in India.

== Transport ==
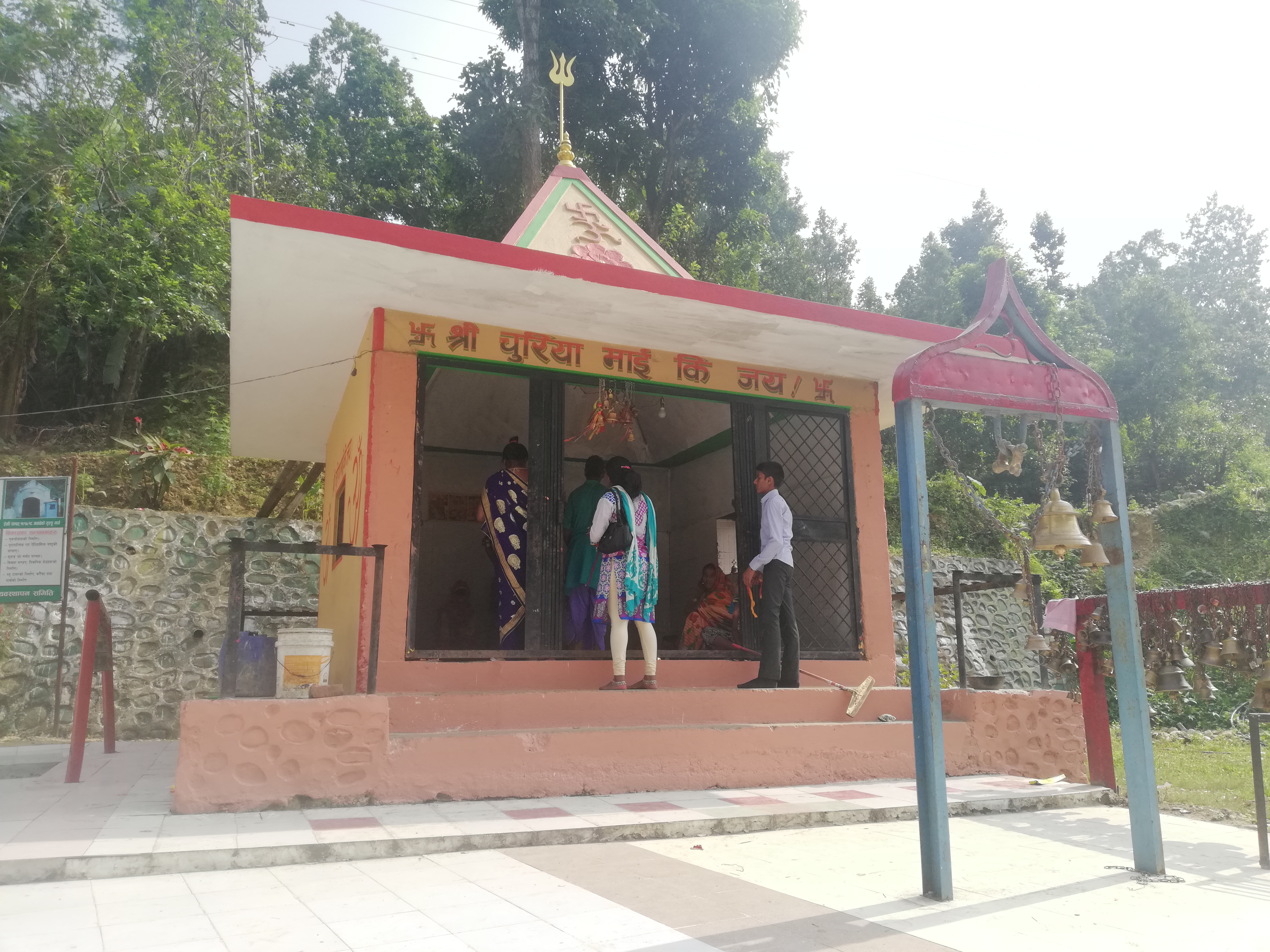
Churiya Mai Temple

The town was served by a branch railway from Raxaul, It has no formal transportation service; most people have their own vehicle.

Churiya Mai Temple at Amlekhganj, Bara, Nepal Churiya Mai temple lies on the Hetauda - Birgunj Highway built during Rana era, it is believed that the Mai protects their devotees from accidents, crash or any types of unpleasant situations.

== See also ==
- Railway stations in Nepal
- Churia Tunnel
