= Nepal Government Railway =

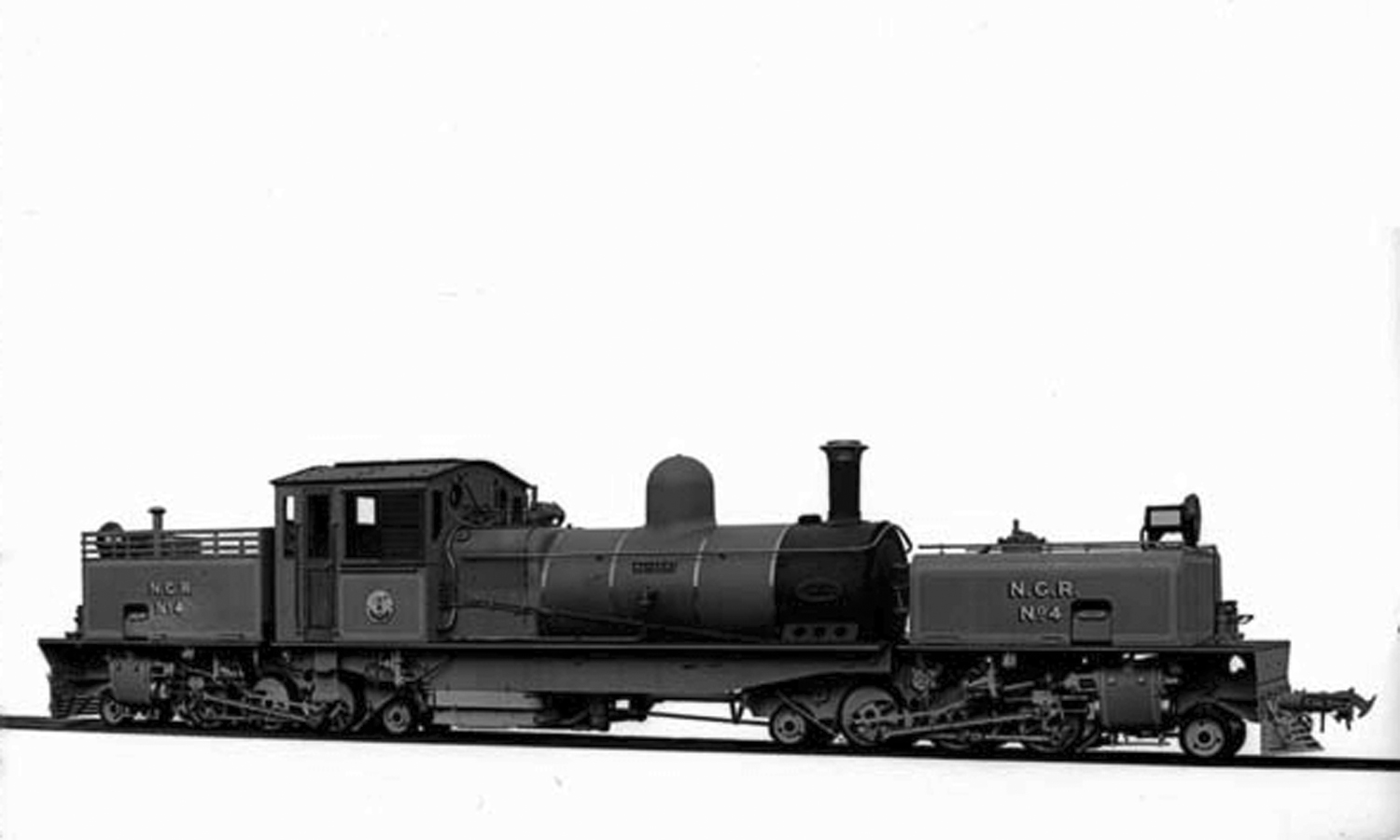
- 2-6-2+2-6-2 Garratt locomotive of the Nepal Government Railways

Overview
- Other name(s): Raxaul-Amlekhganj Rail
- Status: defunct
- Owner: Nepal Government
- Locale: Madhesh-Bagmati
- Termini: Raxaul; Amlekhganj

Service
- Type: Narrow gauge

History
- Opened: 16 February 1927
- Closed: 1965

Technical
- Number of tracks: 1
- Track gauge: 762 mm (2 ft 6 in)

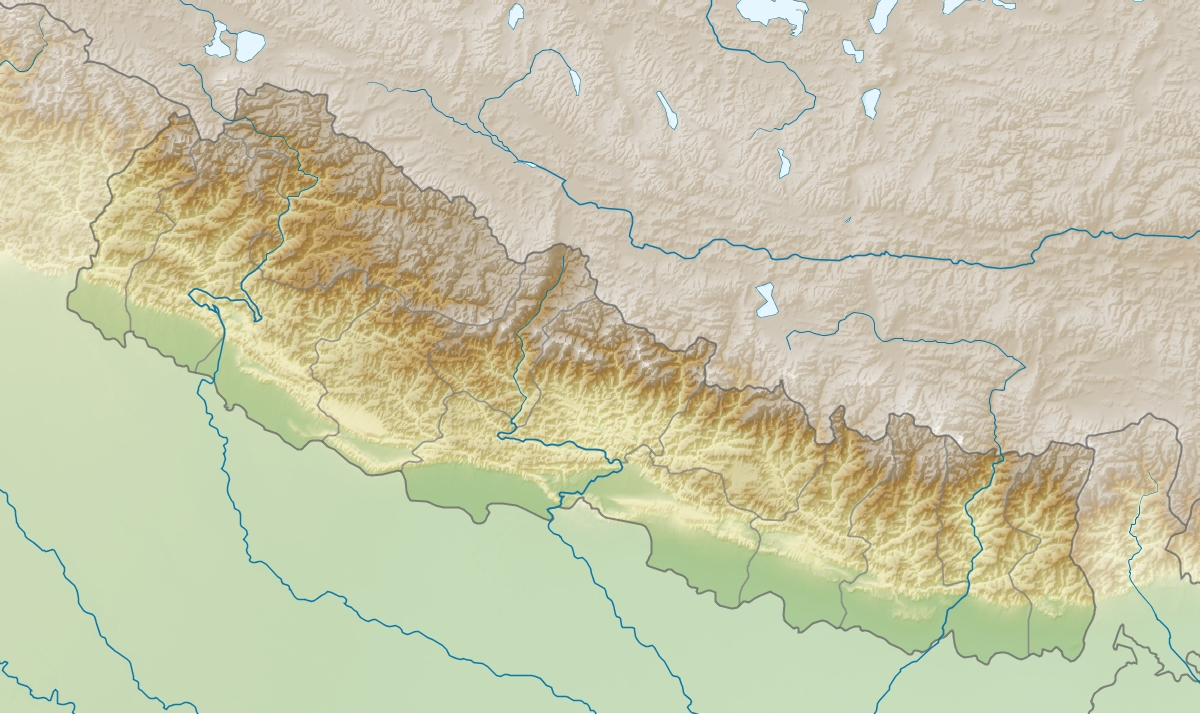
Location in Nepal

The Nepal Government Railway (NGR) (Nepali: नेपाल गभर्मेन्ट रेलवे) was Nepal's first railway. Established in 1927 and closed in 1965, it linked Amlekhganj with Raxaul across the border in India in the south. The 2 ft 6 in (762 mm) narrow gauge railway was 47 km long.

== History ==
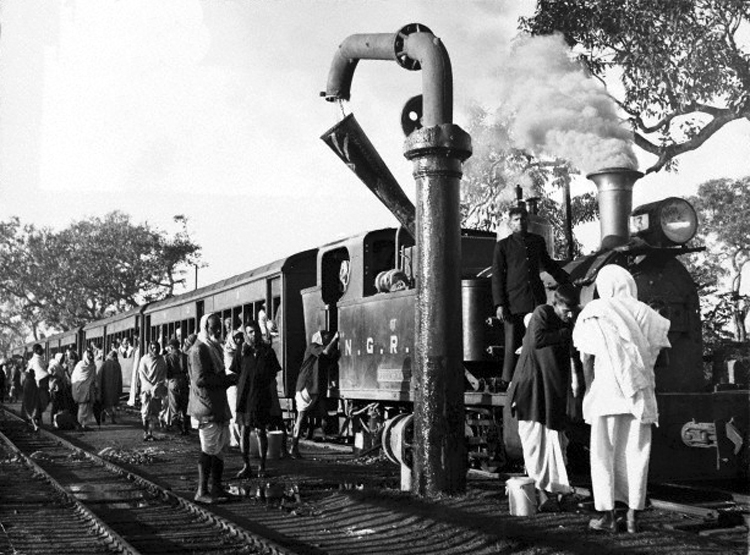
Nepal Government Railway in the 1950s

In 1923, a short narrow gauge railway was built by J. V. Collier of the Indian Forest Service to transport Nepalese timber to India. Collier had been assigned by Nepal's Rana prime minister to manage the forest department in Nepal. In the winter of 1924, Martin and Co. of Kolkata conducted a survey to construct a light railway from the border north to Bichako (Amlekhganj).

Construction began in March 1926, and the Nepal Government Railway opened on 16 February 1927. The narrow gauge railway used a track gauge of 2 ft 6 in (762 mm). The railway possessed seven steam locomotives, 12 coaches and 82 wagons. It operated steam-powered Garratt locomotives manufactured by Beyer, Peacock & Company of England.

Until the highway was built, the Amlekhganj-Raxaul railway was the only route indirectly connecting the capital Kathmandu with India. From Kathmandu, travellers journeyed over the hills on foot, and then by lorry to Amlekhganj where they took the train to India. The need to walk was eliminated after Tribhuvan Highway linking Kathmandu with Amlekhganj was built in 1956. The first daily bus service began operating on it in 1959, conducted by a private company named Nepal Transport Service.

=== Closure ===
The Nepal Government Railway remained in service till 1965 when the construction of the highway linking the southern border made it redundant. The railway was closed down 1965 subsequently. After the closure of service in Raxaul-Amlekhgunj line the only remaining railway service was the Janakpur-Jainagar line.

== In popular culture ==
The Nepal Government Railway appears in the opening scenes of the first Nepali film Aama ("Mother") made by the government of Nepal and released in 1964. It shows the hero, a Gurkha soldier returning to Nepal on leave, travelling on the train as he heads for home.

== Gallery ==
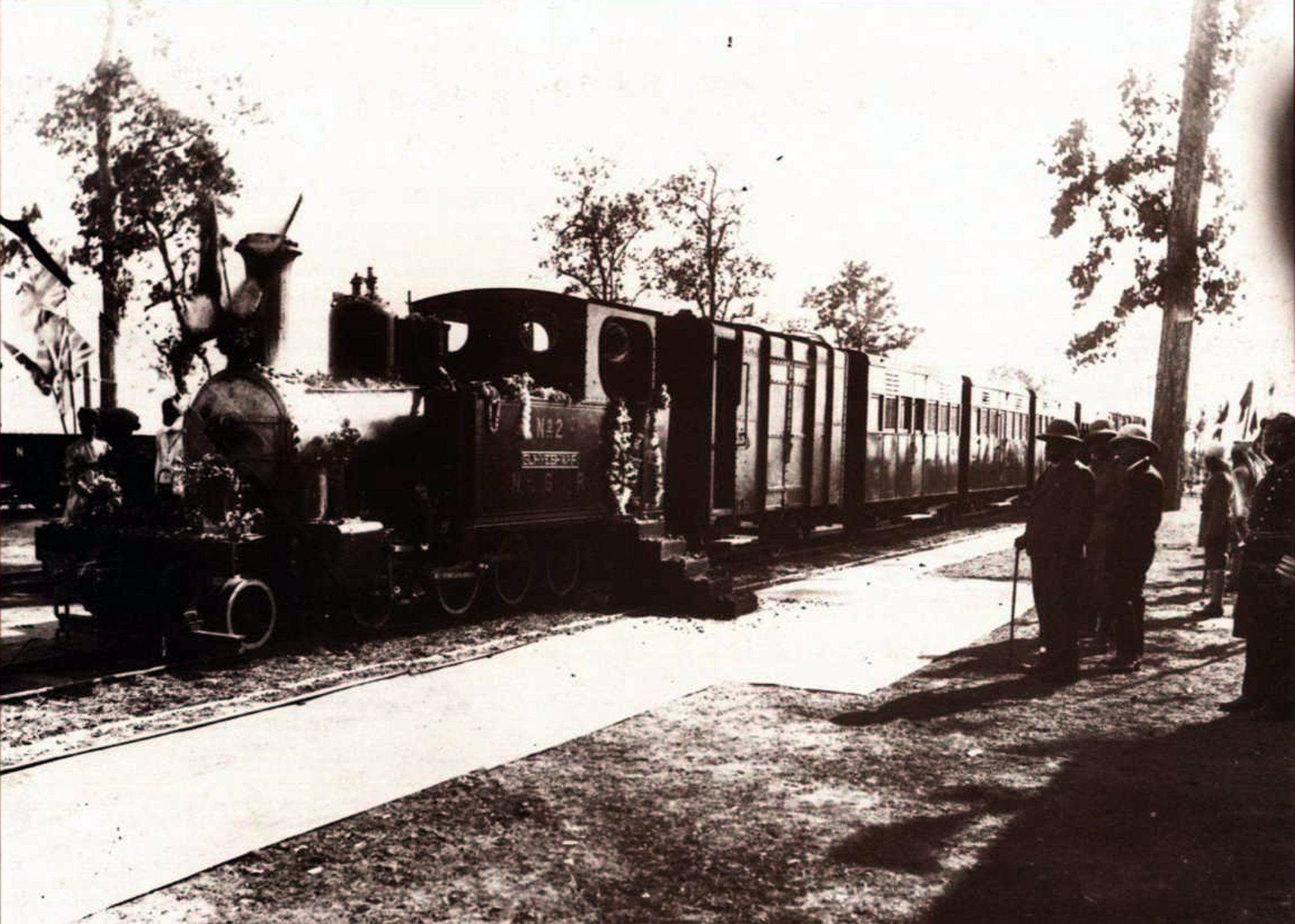
Nepal Government Railway in 1927.

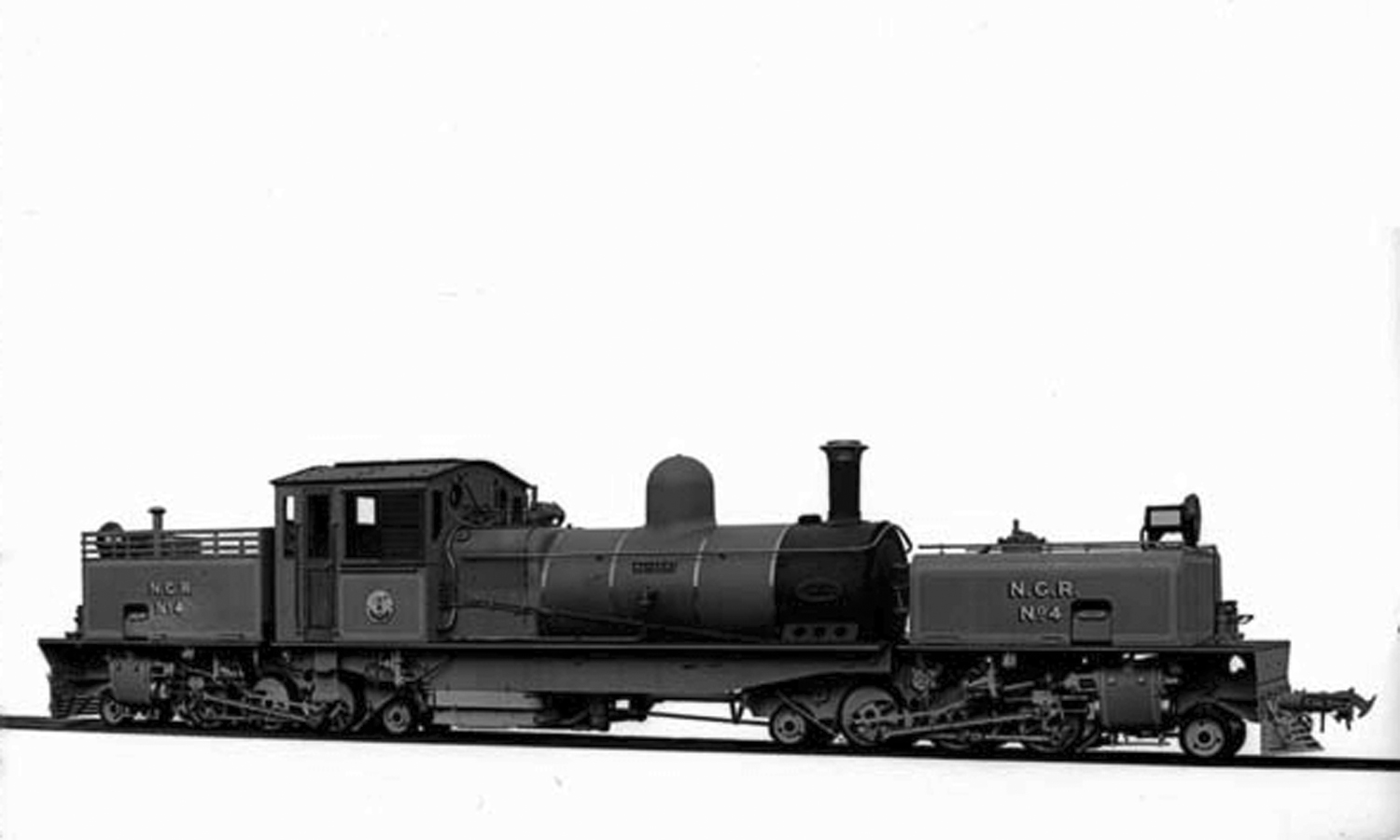
NGR locomotive No. 4, ca 1932.

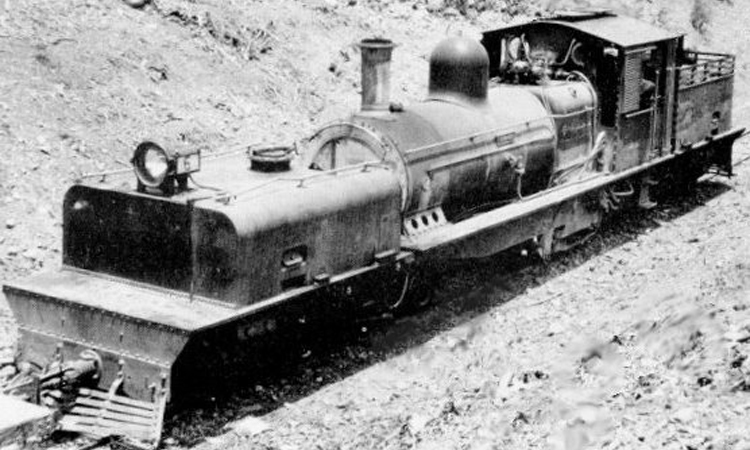
NGR locomotive, ca 1947.

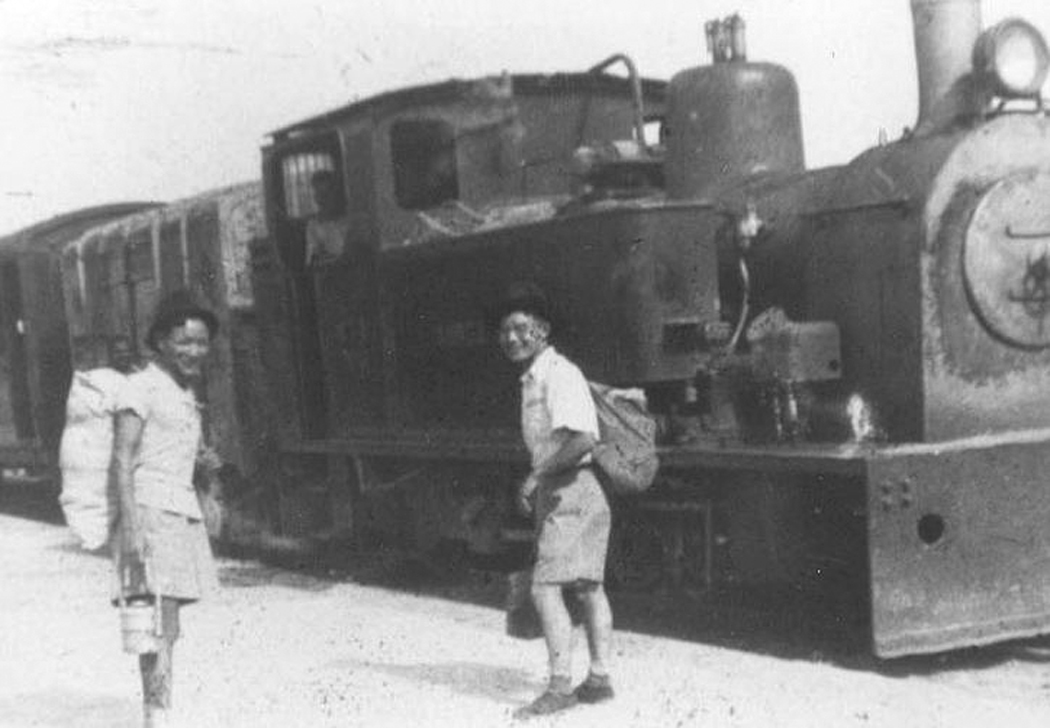
NGR at Raxaul station in 1951.

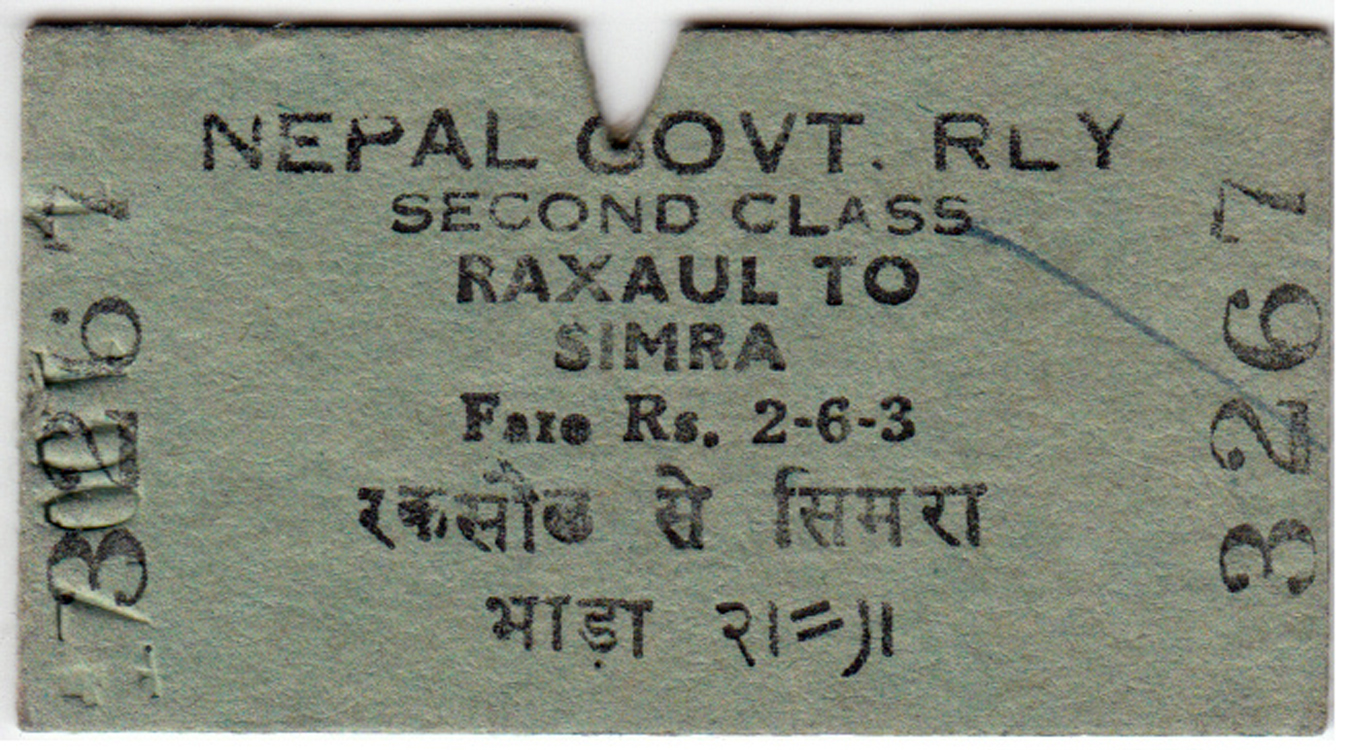
Train ticket Raxaul-Simra

== See also ==
- Nepal Railways
