= Sirsiya =

Coordinates: 26°47′N 85°18′E

Sirsiya सिर्सिया
- Village development committee
- Interactive map of Sirsiya
- Country: Nepal
- Province: Province No. 2
- District: Parsa District

Population (1991)
  - Total: 1,966
- Time zone: UTC+5:45 (Nepal Time)

Sirsiya is a village development committee in Parsa District in Province No. 2 of south-eastern Nepal. At the time of the 1991 Nepal census it had a population of 1966 people living in 352 individual households.

Sirsiya is now known for its Inland Container Depot (ICD) or Dry Port that is very close to the border with India and connected to Raxaul railway junction in India across the border.

== Sirsiya Inland Container Depot ==
The 6 km long metre gauge railway track from Raxaul was converted to broad gauge by the Indian railways to connect Sirsiya Inland Container Depot (ICD) (also known as Birganj Dry Port) that became fully operational in 2005. It facilitates direct movement of containers and break-bulk cargo from Kolkata port and other places in India. It has six full-rake railway sidings. It handles more than 20,000 TEU annually. It can store 1568 TEU. It has been constructed on 38 ha (94 acres) land.

The containerised cargo traffic of 20,000 TEU is almost exclusively import into Nepal. There is very little export in containers with less than 1,000 TEU cargo being exported annually. Break-bulk cargo of about 200,000 tons annually includes both imports and exports.
