= China–Nepal railway =

Planned railway link between China and Nepal

China–Nepal Railway

Overview
- Native name: 中尼铁路/चीन-नेपाल रेलवे
- Status: Planned
- Termini: Kathmandu; Shigatse

Technical
- Line length: 72 km (45 mi) (Nepali section); 556 km (345 mi) (Gyirong–Shigatse section)
- Operating speed: 120 km/h (75 mph) (Gyirong–Shigatse)

The China–Nepal Railway (Chinese: 中尼铁路; Nepali: चीन-नेपाल रेलवे) is a planned railway between China and Nepal. The railway will link Kathmandu with Shigatse, Tibet, crossing the China–Nepal border at Gyirong–Rasuwa.

== Background ==
As a landlocked country nestled against the backdrop of the Himalayas, Nepal has traditionally relied on India for its petroleum supplies, most of its medicines, and essential commodities. India has repeatedly leveraged this dependence as a tool of coercion to influence Nepal's domestic affairs and foreign policy. For instance, in 1989, India imposed a blockade by closing 19 of Nepal's 21 border crossings due to a dispute over trade and transit treaties, effectively pressuring Nepal to align with its political agenda.

In 2015, Nepal accused India of enforcing another blockade in response to a new constitution, shortly after the country was devastated by a devastating earthquake. This blockade led to severe shortages of crucial medicines and fuel, creating a humanitarian crisis and fueling strong anti-India sentiments within Nepal. India's interference in Nepal's internal matters, including the ousting of Prime Minister Oli, further strained relations between the two countries. In response to the growing rift and recognizing the risks of over-reliance on India, Nepal has taken steps to diversify its dependencies. One significant move is the decision to build the China-Nepal Railway, aiming to reduce its reliance on India and mitigate future risks.

== History ==
On December 7, 1973, King Birendra of Nepal visited China and met with Chairman Mao Zedong. During their discussion, King Birendra expressed his desire to strengthen the relationship between Nepal and China. In response, Chairman Mao assured him that China would construct the Qinghai-Tibet Railway to Lhasa, with the eventual goal of extending it to Kathmandu. In 2006, the Qinghai–Tibet Railway, the first railway in Tibet, was completed. The same year, the then chairman of Tibet Autonomous Region Qiangba Puncog told the former Prime Minister of Nepal Khadga Prasad Oli, then Deputy Prime Minister, that the railway would be extended to Shigatse and eventually to China–Nepal border.

In 2016, during Oli's visit to China, the two countries signed a treaty on trade and transit, including a plan to build a high speed railway from Kathmandu to the Chinese border. In June 2018, Nepal and China agreed on construction of the railway as a component of a series of cooperation projects approved by the two sides. A mutual agreement over the pre-feasibility study was reached in August 2018. The China-Nepal Railway was featured in the joint communiqué issued by the leaders during the Belt and Road Forum for International Cooperation held in Beijing in April 2019.

The first extension of the Tibetan Railway, the Lhasa–Shigatse railway, opened in 2014. China plans to extend this railway up to Lake Paiku/Gyirong, which is around 60 km from the Rasuwa border crossing. The cost of the Nepalese section of the railway has been estimated to be from US$2.7 billion up to 5.5 billion, but no agreement has been reached yet over the funding, with Nepal unable to bear the full cost of the railway. A Chinese pre-feasibility study proposed a tunnel under the Langtang National Park to avoid a steep gradient and building in the protected area. In a straight line, the distance between Kathmandu and the border with China is just 70 km.

In December 2022, a 42-month Chinese feasibility study started, but construction of the railway remained uncertain as Nepal is unable get funding for the project. An anonymous Nepalese top government official claimed that "the cross-country railway project with China is less likely to move forward unless the Chinese side expresses willingness to build it under a grant arrangement." However, China is hesitant to provide this, fearing a precedent for other Belt and Road Initiative projects.

== Chinese and Nepalese routes ==
Existing Lanzhou–Kathmandu and Xi'an–Kathmandu freight routes involve cargo being carried by trucks from Shigatse through Gyirong border post to Nepal. This first leg of the route starts from Lanzhou, a major freight hub in the Chinese railway network, to Xining over the Lanzhou–Qinghai railway (opened 1959), from Xining to Lhasa over the Qinghai–Tibet railway (opened 2006), and from Lhasa to Shigatse over the Lhasa–Xigazê railway (opened 2014).

=== Routes in China ===
Within China, the new railway will cross 527.16 km (327.56 mi) of Chinese territory before reaching the Nepali border. The new Shigatse-Gyirong railway will mostly follow the route of China National Highway 318 after leaving Shigatse and pass through Lhatse, Sa'gya, Dinggyê, Tingri, and Nyalam. After reaching Nyalam, the railway will follow Highway 219 to Gyirong, near the Trishuli river and the border with Nepal. The construction of the railway section to Gyirong will start in 2025 and could be opened to traffic in around 2030.

=== Routes in Nepal ===
The Nepali section is 72.25 km (44.89 mi) long, and is considered one of the most challenging railway projects due to topographical issues of the Himalayas. 98.5% of the section will be bridges or tunnels. There will be four stations along the line, with the terminal at Sankhu in Kathmandu. A further extension to Pokhara and Lumbini is planned.

== See also ==
- Railway in Nepal
- 8 different India–Nepal cross-border rail lines
- Churia Tunnel
- China-Laos railway
