= Bijayalpura =

Bijalpura बिजलपुरा
- Former Village Development Committee
- Bijalpura
- Location in province Bijalpura (Nepal)
- Coordinates: 26.90°N 85.85°E
- Country: Nepal
- Province: Madhesh Province
- District: Mahottari District
- Part of: Bardibas Municipality

Population (2011)
  - Total: 8,188
- Time zone: UTC+5:45 (Nepal Time)

Bijayalpura or Bijalpura is a neighborhood or a Tol (Nepali:टोल) in Bardibas city. It was a village development committee in Mahottari District before 2015. In 2015, when Government of Nepal decided to dissolve the old thousands of VDCs and declare new 753 local level body then this VDC merged with Bardibas. Bijalpura is located at ward No. 12 and 13 of Bardibas municipality

Total area of Bijalpura (ward no. 12 & 13) of Bardibas is 11.91 kilometres (7.40 mi) and total population (2011 census) is 8188.
