= Dhanusha 3 =

Parliamentary constituency in Nepal

- Parliamentary constituency
- Dhanusha 3 in Madhesh Province
- Province: Madhesh Province
- District: Dhanusha District

Current constituency
- Created: 1991
- Party: Rastriya Swatantra Party
- Member of Parliament: Manish Jha
- Madhesh Province MPA 3(A): Ram Saroj Yadav (NC)
- Madhesh Province MPA 3(B): Parmeshwor Sah Sudi (PSP-N)

Dhanusha 3 is one of four parliamentary constituencies of Dhanusha District in Nepal. This constituency came into existence on the Constituency Delimitation Commission (CDC) report submitted on 31 August 2017.

Dhanusha 3 is one of the constituency of national importance in Nepal. Due to presence of some projects of national recognition like Rajarshi Janak University, ADB urban development project, Janakpur-Jatahi-Ayodhya 6 lane and Janakpur-Jaynagar railway this constituency is taken as the pocket area of Nepali Congress in regard to development.

== Incorporated areas ==
Dhanusha 3 incorporates Mukhiyapati Musharniya Rural Municipality, Nagarain Municipality, Dhanauj Rural Municipality, wards 9 of Bideha Municipality and wards 1–8, 10, 12, 15, 16, 20 and 23–25 of Janakpur Sub-metropolitan City.

== Assembly segments ==
It encompasses the following Madhesh Provincial Assembly segment

- Dhanusha 3(A)
- Dhanusha 3(B)

== Members of Parliament ==
=== Parliament/Constituent Assembly ===
Election	Member	Party
1991	Ananda Prasad Dhungana	Nepali Congress
2008	Bimalendra Nidhi	Nepali Congress
2013	Bimalendra Nidhi	Nepali Congress
2017	Rajendra Mahato	Rastriya Janata Party Nepal
2022	Julie Kumari Mahato	CPN (UML)
2026	Manish Jha	Rastriya Swatantra Party

=== Provincial Assembly ===
==== 3(A) ====
Election	Member	Party
2017	Ram Saroj Yadav	Nepali Congress

==== 3(B) ====
Election	Member	Party
2017	Parmeshwor Sah Sudi	Rastriya Janata Party Nepal
April 2020	Parmeshwor Sah Sudi	People's Socialist Party, Nepal
August 2021	Parmeshwor Sah Sudi	Loktantrik Samajwadi Party, Nepal

== Election results ==
=== Election in the 2020s ===
==== 2026 general election ====
Candidate	Party	Votes	%
Manish Jha	Rastriya Swatantra Party	43,988	59.14
Bimalendra Nidhi	Nepali Congress	16,652	22.39
Julie Kumari Mahato	CPN (UML)	9,786	13.16
Ramlalit Mandal	Nepali Communist Party	709	0.95
Parmeshwor Sahu Sudi	Janata Samajbadi Party, Nepal	500	0.67
Roshan Yadav	Independent	416	0.56
Diwakar Kumar Sah	Independent	398	0.54
Gopal Prasad Sah	Janamat Party	381	0.51
Others		1,547	2.08
Total		74,377	100.00
Majority		27,336	

==== 2022 general election ====
Candidate	Party	Votes	%
Julie Kumari Mahato	CPN (UML)	33,388	49.18
Anil Kumar Jha	Loktantrik Samajwadi Party, Nepal	23,686	34.89
Shambhu Nath Sah	Janamat Party	7,374	10.86
Others		3,445	5.07
Total		67,893	100.00
Majority		9,702	
CPN (UML) gain			

==== 2022 Nepalese provincial elections ====
===== 3(A) =====
Party	Candidate	Votes
Nepali Congress	Ram Saroj Yadav	
CPN (Unified Marxist–Leninist)		
Loktantrik Samajwadi Party, Nepal		
Others		
Invalid votes		
Result		
Source: Election Commission

===== 3(B) =====
Party	Candidate	Votes
Nepali Congress	Hari Shankar Sah	
Loktantrik Samajwadi Party, Nepal		
CPN (Unified Marxist–Leninist)		
Others		
Invalid votes		
Result		
Source: Election Commission

=== Election in the 2010s ===
==== 2017 legislative elections ====
Party	Candidate	Votes
Rastriya Janata Party Nepal	Rajendra Mahato	30,750
Nepali Congress	Bimalendra Nidhi	27,847
CPN (Maoist Centre)	Ram Singh Yadav	2,346
Others		1,300
Invalid votes		2,930
Result	RJPN gain	
Source: Election Commission

==== 2017 Nepalese provincial elections ====
===== 3(A) =====
Party	Candidate	Votes
Nepali Congress	Ram Saroj Yadav	15,685
Rastriya Janata Party Nepal	Kavindra Nath Thakur	14,047
CPN (Unified Marxist–Leninist)	Dipendra Kumar Yadav	4,945
Others		491
Invalid votes		1,556
Result	Congress gain	
Source: Election Commission

===== 3(B) =====
Party	Candidate	Votes
Rastriya Janata Party Nepal	Parmeshwor Sah Sudi	15,293
Nepali Congress	Shyam Prasad Sah	10,472
Communist Party of Nepal (Maoist Centre)	Kameshwar Prasad Mahato	1,070
Others		598
Invalid votes		899
Result	RJPN gain	
Source: Election Commission

==== 2013 Constituent Assembly election ====
Party	Candidate	Votes
Nepali Congress	Bimalendra Nidhi	15,031
CPN (Unified Marxist–Leninist)	Juli Kumari Mahato	13,539
UCPN (Maoist)	Haridev Mandal	2,523
Others		5,065
Result	Congress hold	
Source: NepalNews

=== Election in the 2000s ===
==== 2008 Constituent Assembly election ====
Party	Candidate	Votes
Nepali Congress	Bimalendra Nidhi	15,582
CPN (Unified Marxist–Leninist)	Haridev Mandal	9,936
Terai Madhes Loktantrik Party	Amresh Narayan Jha	6,909
Independent	Sadhu Yadav	2,007
CPN (Maoist)	Sobhit Yadav	1,311
Others		3,114
Invalid votes		3,007
Result	Congress hold	
Source: Election Commission

=== Election in the 1990s ===
==== 1999 legislative elections ====
Party	Candidate	Votes
Nepali Congress	Ananda Prasad Dhungana	15,026
Rastriya Prajatantra Party (Chand)	Hem Bahadur Malla	13,736
CPN (Unified Marxist–Leninist)	Anand Yadav	10,256
CPN (Marxist–Leninist)	Raghubir Mahaseth	9,974
Others		3,272
Invalid Votes		1,301
Result	Congress hold	
Source: Election Commission

==== 1994 legislative elections ====
Party	Candidate	Votes
Nepali Congress	Ananda Prasad Dhungana	17,429
CPN (Unified Marxist–Leninist)	Bhola Prasad Shah	15,133
Rastriya Prajatantra Party	Hem Bahadur Malla	12,937
Samyukta Jana Morcha Nepal	Dinesh Bharati	1,008
Others		1,886
Result	Congress hold	
Source: Election Commission

==== 1991 legislative elections ====
Party	Candidate	Votes
Nepali Congress	Ananda Prasad Dhungana	20,877
CPN (Unified Marxist–Leninist)	Ishwar Pokhrel	14,311
Result	Congress gain	

== See also ==
- List of parliamentary constituencies of Nepal
