= Janaknandini Rural Municipality =

Janaknandani जनकनन्दिनी
- Municipality
- Municipality in Nepal
- Location in Nepal Janaknandani (Nepal)
- Coordinates: 26.67°N 86.02°E
- Country: Nepal
- Development Region: Central
- District: Dhanusa District
- Province: Madhesh Province
- Established: 2016 A.D. (2073 B.S.)

Area
  - Total: 27.62 km^{2} (10.66 sq mi)

Population (2011)
  - Total: 25,085
  - Density: 908.2/km^{2} (2,352/sq mi)
  - Religions: Hindu Muslim Christian

Languages
  - Local: Maithili, Tharu, Nepali
- Time zone: UTC+5:45 (NST)
- Postal Code: 45600
- Area code: 041
- Website: http://www.janaknandinimun.gov.np/

Janaknandani (Nepali: जनकनन्दिनी) is a rural municipality in Danusha District in Province No. 2 of Nepal. It was formed in 2016 occupying current 6 sections (wards) from previous 6 VDCs. It occupies an area of 27.62 km^{2} with a total population of 25,085.

== Villages and wards ==
Janaknandani
| # | Villages | Ward No. |
|---|---|---|
| 1 | Inarwa | 1 |
| 2 | Ballagoth | 2 |
| 3 | Mahua | 3 |
| 4 | Khajuri | 4 |
| 5 | patnuka | 5 |
| 6 | Balaha Kathal | 6 |
