= Mukhiyapatti Musharniya Rural Municipality =

Mukhiyapatti Musharniya Rural Municipality मुखियापट्टी मुसहरनिया गाउँपालिका
- Rural municipality
- Location in Madhesh Province Mukhiyapatti Musharniya Rural Municipality (Nepal)
- Coordinates: 26°36′20″N 85°52′50″E
- Country: Nepal
- Development Region: Central
- Province: Province No. 2
- District: Dhanusha District
- Established: 2073 BS

Government
  - Chairman: Jay Kumar yadav (CPN (US))
  - Deputy Chairman: Saida khatun (CPN (US))

Area
  - Total: 26.84 km^{2} (10.36 sq mi)
- Elevation: 59 m (194 ft)

Population (2011)
  - Total: 25,482
  - Density: 949.4/km^{2} (2,459/sq mi)
  - Ethnicities: Maithil Brahmin Yadav Lohar Sudi Teli
  - Religion: Hinduism Islam

Languages
  - Local: Maithili
  - Official: Nepali
- Time zone: UTC+5:45 (Nepal Time)
- Postal Code: 45611, 45612
- Area code: 041
- Website: mukhiyapattimusaharmiyamun.gov.np

Mukhiyapatti Musharniya is a rural municipality in Dhanusha District in Province No. 2 of south-eastern Nepal established in 2073 BS. As of 2011 Nepal census, it has a population of 25,482. It was formed by joining Tulsiyahi Nikas, Tulsiyani Jabdi, Baheda Bela and former Mukhiyapatti Musharniya Village development committees. The total area of Nagarain municipality is 26.84 km^{2}.

== Lowest altitude in Nepal ==
On a geographical basis, it is the lowest point in Nepal from sea level, the highest being the peak of Mount Everest.

== Notable people ==
- Ram Saroj Yadav, CA member, Member of Provincial Assembly and Minister of Physical Infrastructure Development of Madhesh Pradesh.
- Kavindra Nath Thakur, member of 2nd Nepalese Constituent Assembly

== See also ==
- Bimalendra Nidhi
