= Bideha, Dhanusa =

Bideha विदेह
- Municipality
- Municipality in Nepal
- Location in Nepal Bideha (Nepal)
- Coordinates: 26.83°N 86.00°E
- Country: Nepal
- Development Region: Central
- District: Dhanusa
- Province: Madhesh

Government
  - Mayor: bechan das
  - Deputy Mayor: Asha Devi Jha

Area
  - Total: 45.51 km^{2} (17.57 sq mi)

Population (2011)
  - Total: 32,266
  - Density: 709.0/km^{2} (1,836/sq mi)
  - Religions: Hindu Muslim Christian

Languages
  - Local: Maithili, Tharu, Nepali
- Time zone: UTC+5:45 (NST)
- Postal Code: 45600
- Area code: 041
- Website: www.bidehamun.gov.np

Bideha (Nepali: विदेह) is a municipality in Danusha District in Madhesh Province of Nepal. It was formed in 2016 occupying current 9 sections (wards) from previous 6 VDCs. It occupies an area of 45.51 km^{2} with a total population of 32,266. The municipality has got the name in memory of the most liberal, democratic king Janak who is also known as Bideha, videh is the ancient state of epic era which was first ruled by king and later after karal janak adopteted Republican system.

== Villages or Town ==
- Karmahi
- Thadi Jhijha
- Duhabi
- Ekarahi
- Giddha
- Baphai
- Itaharwa
