= Dhanauji Rural Municipality =

Dhanauji Rural Municipality धनौजी गाउँपालिका
- Rural municipality
- Location in Madhesh Province Dhanauji Rural Municipality (Nepal)
- Coordinates: 26.67°N 85.98°E
- Country: Nepal
- Development Region: Central
- Province: Madhesh
- District: Dhanusha
- Established: 2073 BS

Government
  - Chairman: Raj Kumar Sah (NC)
  - Deputy Chairman: Rambati Devi Mandal (Nepali Congress)

Area
  - Total: 22 km^{2} (8.5 sq mi)
- Elevation: 59 m (194 ft)

Population (2011)
  - Total: 21,395
  - Density: 970/km^{2} (2,500/sq mi)
  - Ethnicities: Kewat; Dhanuk; Maithil Brahmin; Yadav; Teli
  - Religion: Hinduism; Islam

Languages
  - Local: Maithili
  - Official: Nepali
- Time zone: UTC+5:45 (Nepal Time)
- Postal Code: 45611, 45612
- Area code: 041
- Website: dhanaujimun.gov.np

Dhanauji is a rural municipality in Dhanusha District in Province No. 2 of south-eastern Nepal established in 2073. As of the 2011 Nepal census, it has a population of 22,395. It was formed by joining Jhojhi Kataiya, Lakhauri, Bahuarba and former Dhanuji Village development committees. The total area of Dhanauji municipality is 22 km^{2}.

== See also ==
- Rambati Devi Mandal
- Ram Saroj Yadav
- Bimalendra Nidhi
