= Mahuwa =

Mahuwa may refer to the following places in Nepal:

- Mahuwa, Kapilvastu, in Lumbini
- Mahuwa (Pra. Ko), in Dhanusha, Janakpur
- Mahuwa (Pra. Khe), in Dhanusha, Janakpur

== See also ==
- Mahuva (disambiguation), places in Gujarat, western India
- Mahwa (disambiguation)
