= Nagarain =

Nagarain नगराईन
- Municipality
- Location in Madhesh Province Nagarain (Nepal)
- Coordinates: 26°38′20″N 85°54′58″E
- Country: Nepal
- Development Region: Central
- Province: Madhesh
- District: Dhanusha
- Literacy rate: 41.76%

Government
  - Type: Mayor-council
  - Mayor: Binay Kumar Yadav (NC)
  - Deputy Mayor: Radha Devi Yadav (UML)

Area
  - Total: 38.71 km^{2} (14.95 sq mi)
- Elevation: 64 m (210 ft)

Population (2011)
  - Total: 36,336
  - Density: 938.7/km^{2} (2,431/sq mi)
  - Ethnicities: Maithil Brahmin koiri Kayastha Yadav Sudi Dhanuk Musahar Dom
  - Religion: Hinduism Islam

Languages
  - Local: Maithili
  - Official: Nepali
- Time zone: UTC+5:45 (Nepal Time)
- Postal Code: 45611, 45612
- Area code: 041
- Website: nagrainmun.gov.np

Nagarain is a municipality in Dhanusha District in Province No. 2 of south-eastern Nepal. As of 2011 Nepal census, it has a population of 36,336 living in 6,478 individual households. It was formed by joining Fulgama, Devdiha, old Nagrain, Lagmagadha Guthi and Ghodghans village development committees. The total area of Nagarain municipality is 38.71 km^{2}.

== Education ==
Nagarain is facilitated by Shree Rajeshwor Nidhi Higher Secondary School, which is run by government. It attracts students from Nagarain as well as the neighbouring villages. Recently, the infrastructure of this school was upgraded and a new classroom block was constructed with the aid from Government of India. Therefore, this building is named "Nepal-Bharat Maitri Bhawan". There are few private schools (run by individuals) which provide education in English medium.

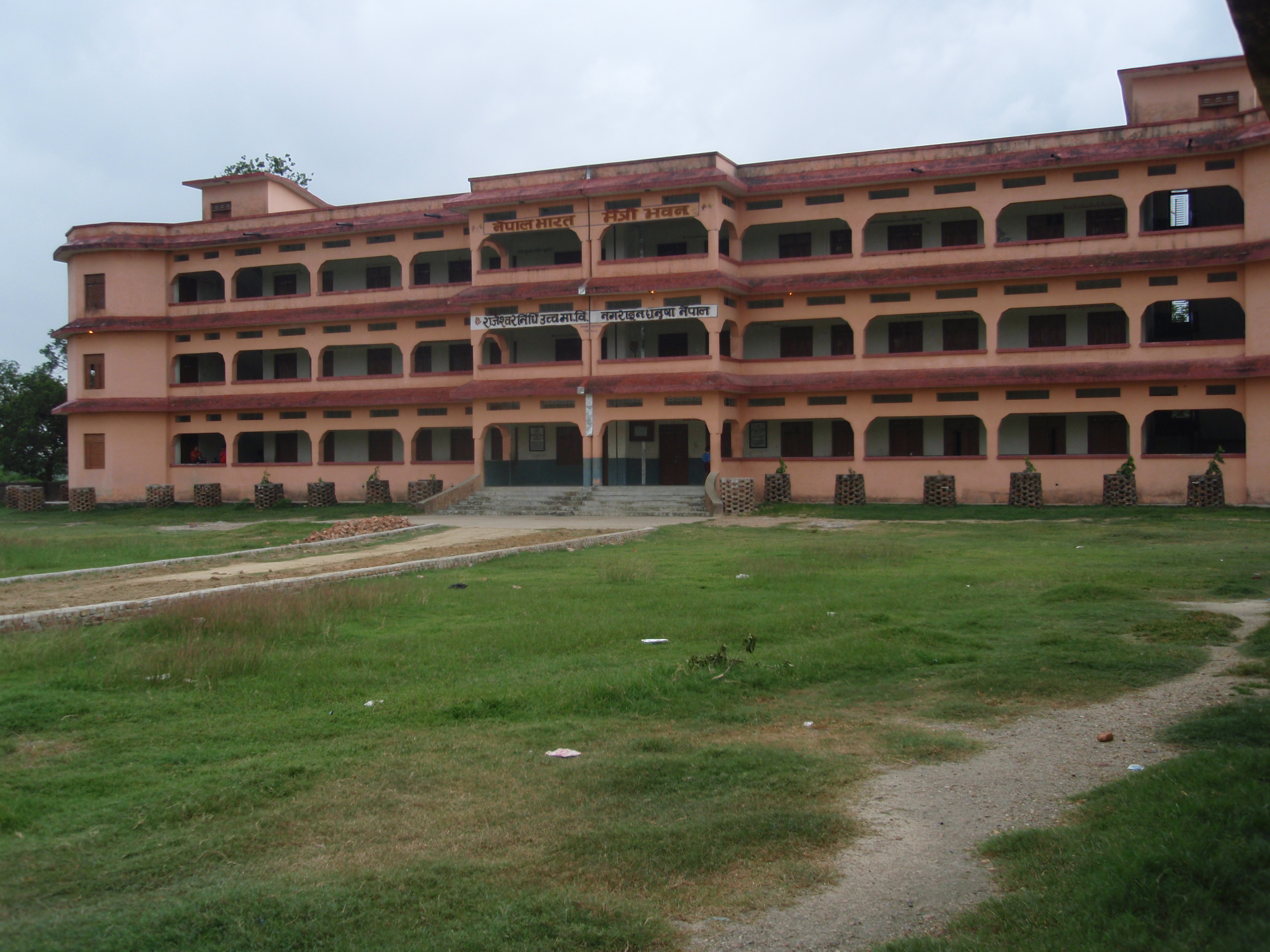
Shree Rajeshwor Nidhi Higher Secondary School, Nagarain, Dhanusha, Nepal

== Notable people from Nagarain ==
- Rajeshwor Nidhi
- Mahendra Narayan Nidhi
- Bimalendra Nidhi
- Durgananda Jha
- Smriti Narayan Chaudhary
