= Mowa =

Mowa may refer to the following places in India:

- Mowa, Gujarat on Saurashtra peninsula
- Mowa State, a former princely state of Kathiawar, with seat in the above town
- Mowa, Chhattisgarh

It may also refer to:

- MOWA Band of Choctaw Indians, a state-recognized tribe in Alabama

== See also ==
- Mahuva (disambiguation)
