= Mithila Municipality =

Mithila मिथिला
- Municipality
- Location of Mithila Municipality in Nepal
- Coordinates: 26.57°N 86.57°E
- Country: Nepal
- Province: Madhesh
- District: Dhanusa

Government
  - Mayor: Mahendra Mahato (NC)
  - Deputy Mayor: Sunita Singh Budhathoki CPN(UML)

Area
  - Total: 187.93 km^{2} (72.56 sq mi)

Population
  - Total: 45,164
  - Density: 240.32/km^{2} (622.44/sq mi)
- Time zone: UTC+5:45 (Nepal Time)
- Area code: 041
- Website: www.mithilamun.gov.np

Mithila is a municipality in Danusha District in Madhesh Province of south-eastern Nepal. After the government announcement the municipality was established on 2 December 2014 by merging the existing Begadawar, Nakatajhijh and Dhalkebar village development committees (VDCs). At the time of the 2011 Nepal census after merging the three VDCs population it had a total population of 31,575 persons. After the government decision the number of municipalities has reached 191 in Nepal.
