= Govindapur, Dhanusa =

Govindapur गोविन्दपुर
- Country: Nepal
- Zone: Janakpur Zone
- District: Dhanusa District

Population (1991)
  - Total: 6,504
- Time zone: UTC+5:45 (Nepal Time)

Govindapur is a town in Dhanusadham Municipality in Dhanusa District in the Janakpur Zone of south-eastern Nepal. The former village was merged on 18 May 2014 along with Govindapur, Umprempur, Yagyabhumi, and Dhanusadham village development committees (VDCs) to form the new municipality. At the time of the 1991 Nepal census, it had a population of 6,504 persons living in 1283 individual households.
