= Duhabi =

Duhabi may refer to:

- Duhabi, Janakpur, Village Development Committee in the Janakpur Zone of south-eastern Nepal
- Duhabi, Kosi, Village Development Committee in the Kosi Zone of south-eastern Nepal
