= Lado Bela =

- Village development committee
- Location in Nepal
- Coordinates: 26°43′1″N 85°54′43″E
- Country: Nepal
- Zone: Janakpur Zone
- District: Dhanusa District

Population (1991)
  - Total: N/A
- Time zone: UTC+5:45 (Nepal Time)

Lado Bela is a joint village development committee in Dhanusa District in the Janakpur Zone of south-eastern Nepal.
