= Bhutahi Paterwa =

Coordinates: 26.7600°N 85.9800°E

Bhutahi Paterwa भुताही पटेर्वा
- Village development committee
- Interactive map of Bhutahi Paterwa
- Country: Nepal
- Zone: Janakpur Zone
- District: Dhanusa District
- Province: Madhesh Pradesh
- Municipality: Mithila Bihari

Area
  - Total: 9.3 km^{2} (3.6 sq mi)

Population (2021)
  - Total: 4,736
  - Density: 510/km^{2} (1,300/sq mi)
  - Religions: Hindu and Muslim
- Time zone: UTC+5:45 (Nepal Time)

Bhutahi Paterwa is a village development committee in Dhanusa District in the Janakpur Zone of south-eastern Nepal. Currently, it is situated in Mithila Bihari Municipality ward no. 01 of Madhesh Pradesh. At the time of the 2021 Nepal census it had a population of 4,736 persons living in more than 1000 individual households in 9.3 km^{2}. Most people living in this village follow Hinduism. The main inhabitants are Mandal, Daha, Dhanuk, Yadav, Shah, Das, Thakur, Sharma, Sada (Mushahar) and many more. It has various religious and cultural places such as Maharani Mai Temple (Sthan), Ram Janaki Temple (Kutti), Bhuinya Baba Mandir, Mrigakund etc. There is a Ganesh Temple in the southern part of the village. There is a big and attractive temple of Maharani Mai on the bank of Chhath Pokhari. One of the exciting place in the village is Purni Pokhari. It includes Naga Baba Mandir, Hanuman Mandir, Mahadev (Shiv) Mandir, Dihabar Mandir etc.
