= Siddha, Nepal =

Siddha, Nepal may refer to:

- Siddha, Gandaki
- Siddha, Janakpur
