= Balahasaghara =

Balha Saghara बल्हासघारा Kamala Municipality-4
- Village development committee
- Location in Nepal
- Coordinates: 26.67°N 86.16°E
- Country: Nepal
- Zone: Janakpur Zone
- District: Dhanusa District

Population (2011)
  - Total: 4,030
- Time zone: UTC+5:45 (Nepal Time)

Balha Saghara is a village development committee in Dhanusa District in the Janakpur Zone of south-eastern Nepal. At the time of the 2011 Nepal census it had a population of 4,030 and had 698 houses.
