= Umprempur =

Coordinates: 26°54′N 86°1′E

Umprempur उमाप्रेमपुर
- Interactive map of Umprempur
- Country: Nepal
- Zone: Janakpur Zone
- District: Dhanusa District

Population (1991)
  - Total: 9,345
- Time zone: UTC+5:45 (Nepal Time)

Umprempur is a town in Dhanusadham Municipality in Dhanusa District in the Janakpur Zone of south-eastern Nepal. The former village was merged on 18 May 2014 along with Govindapur, Umprempur, Yagyabhumi, Dhanusadham village development committees (VDCs) to form the new municipality. At the time of the 1991 Nepal census it had a population of 9,345 persons living in 1774 individual households.
