= Mahwa =

Mahwa may refer to:

- Mahwa tree, a plant
- Mahwa, Rajasthan, a town in India
- Mahwa, Iran, a village in Kerman Province, Iran

== See also ==
- Mahuwa (disambiguation)
- Mahuva (disambiguation)
