= Makhanaha =

Makhanaha may refer to:

- Makhanaha, Janakpur, Nepal
- Makhanaha, Sagarmatha, Nepal
