= Lakshmi Niwas (disambiguation) =

Lakshmi Niwas is a Rana palace in Maharajgunj, Kathmandu, the capital of Nepal.

Lakshmi Niwas may also refer to:

- Lakshmi Niwas (Marathi TV series)
- Lakshmi Niwas (Hindi TV series)

== See also ==
- Lakshmi Niwas Birla (1909–1994), Indian industrialist, philanthropist, writer, and art connoisseur
- Lakshminibas, a village development committee in south-eastern Nepal
- Lakshmi Nivasa, a 1977 Indian Kannada-language film
- Lakshmi Nivasam, a 1968 Indian Telugu-language drama film
