= Bateshwar, Nepal =

Bateshwar बटेश्वर
- Village development committee
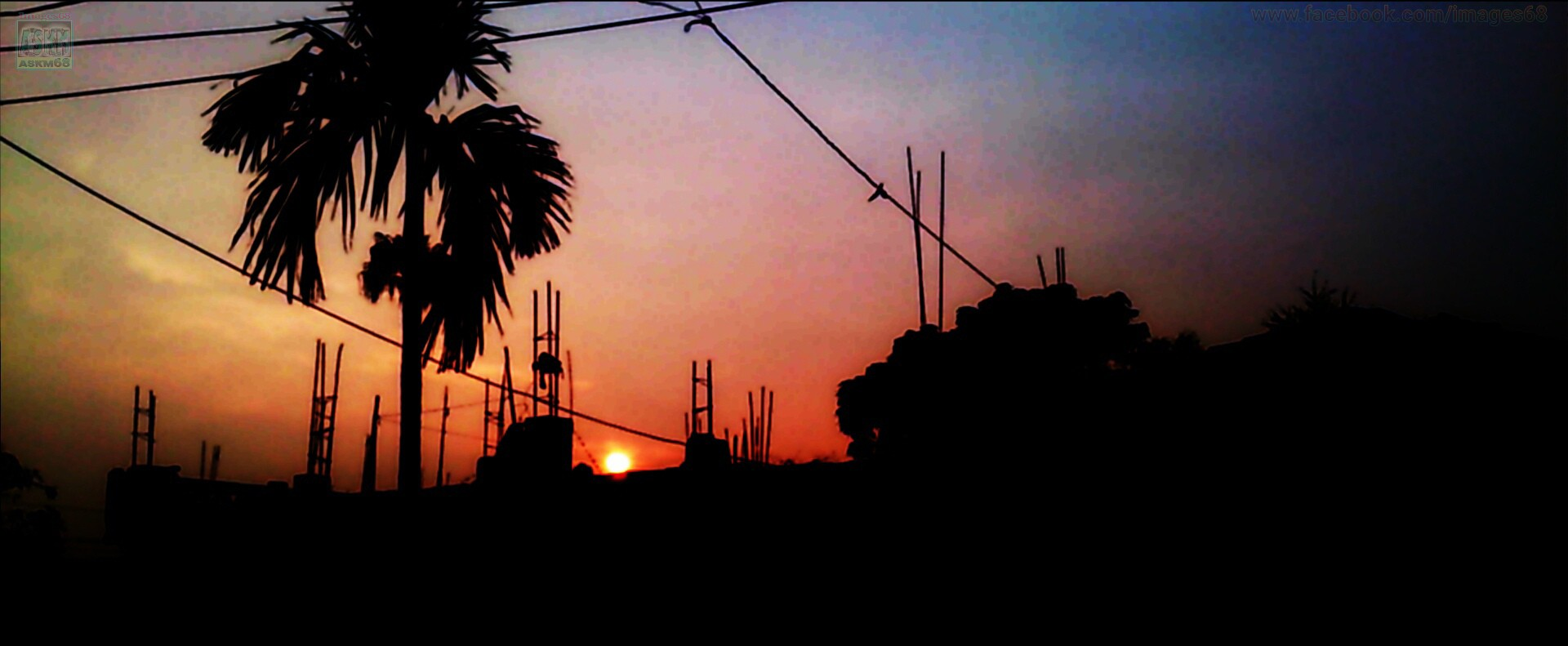

- Location in Nepal
- Coordinates: 26.89°N 85.93°E
- Country: Nepal
- Zone: Janakpur Zone
- District: Dhanusa District

Population (1991)
  - Total: 4,824
- Time zone: UTC+5:45 (Nepal Time)

Bateshwar is a village development committee in Dhanusa District in the Janakpur Zone of south-eastern Nepal. At the time of the 1991 Nepal census it had a population of 4,824 and had 888 houses.
