= Baniniya =

Baniniya may refer to:

- Baniniya, Saptari
- Baniniya, Dhanusha
