= Mahuva =

Mahuva may refer to the following places in Gujarat, western India:

- Mahuva, Bhavnagar, on Saurashtra peninsula
  - Mahuva, Bhavnagar (Vidhan Sabha constituency), an assembly constituency encompassing the above town.
  - Mahuva Junction railway station
- Mahuva, Surat
  - Mahuva, Surat (Vidhan Sabha constituency), an assembly constituency encompassing the above town.
- Mowa State, a former princely state in Kathiawar

== See also ==
- Mahuwa (disambiguation), places in Nepal
- Mahwa (disambiguation)
