= Sonigama =

Sonigama सोनिगामा
- Village development committee
- Location in Nepal
- Coordinates: 26.73°N 86.05°E
- Country: Nepal
- Zone: Janakpur Zone
- District: Dhanusa District

Population (1991)
  - Total: 5,077
- Time zone: UTC+5:45 (Nepal Time)

Sonigama is a village development committee in Dhanusa District in the Janakpur Zone of south-eastern Nepal. At the time of the 1991 Nepal census it had a population of 5,077 persons living in 925 individual households.
