= Sapahi, Dhanusha =

Coordinates: 26°48′N 85°57′E

Sapahi सपहि
- City
- Interactive map of Sapahi
- Country: Nepal
- Zone: Janakpur Zone
- District: Dhanusa District

Population (1991)
  - Total: 6,023
- Time zone: UTC+5:45Baran Yadav.]] (Nepal Time)

Sapahi is a former Village Development Committee in Dhanusa District besides of ramdaiya village in the Janakpur Zone of south-eastern Nepal. At the time of the 1991 Nepal census it had a population of 6,023 persons residing in 1078 individual households. Sapahi is birthplace and home town of the first president of Nepal Ram Baran Yadav.
