= Bega Shivapur =

Benga Shivapur बेंगा शिवपुर
- Village development committee
- Location in Nepal
- Coordinates: 26.76°N 85.95°E
- Country: Nepal
- Zone: Janakpur Zone
- District: Dhanusa District

Population (1991)
  - Total: 4,899
- Time zone: UTC+5:45 (Nepal Time)

Bega Shivapur is a village development committee in Dhanusa District in the Janakpur Zone of south-eastern Nepal. At the time of the 1991 Nepal census it had a population of 4,899 and had 894 houses.
