= Singyahi Maidan =

Village development committee in Janakpur Zone, Nepal

Singyahi Madan
- Village development committee
- Location in Nepal =in north of janakpur sub metro
- Coordinates: 26.72°N 86.17°E
- Country: Nepal
- Zone: Janakpur Zone
- District: Dhanusa District

Population (1991)
  - Total: 7,203
- Time zone: UTC+5:45 (Nepal Time)

Singyahi Madan was Villages development committee (Nepal) in Dhanusa District in the Janakpur Zone of south-easter, Province-02 Nepal.Now it's comes under kamala municipality. At the time of the 1991 Nepal census it had a population of 7,203 persons living in 1296 individual households. It is an agricultural area.

It consists of two villages named Hathmunda and Sakhuba. Nowadays foreign employment has become the great source of income in that village. About 60% of youths are abroad to earn money.
