= Shantipur, Dhanusha =

Shantipur शान्तिपुर chandrapur
- Village development committee
- Location in Nepal
- Coordinates: 26.86°N 85.93°E
- Country: Nepal
- Zone: Janakpur Zone
- District: Dhanusa District

Population (1991)
  - Total: 4,007
- Time zone: UTC+5:45 (Nepal Time)

Shantipur is a village development committee in Dhanusa District in the Janakpur Zone of south-eastern Nepal. At the time of the 1991 Nepal census it had a population of 4,007 persons living in 674 individual households.
