= Kanakpatti =

Kanakpatti कनकपट्टी
- Village development committee
- Location in Nepal
- Coordinates: 26.72°N 85.97°E
- Country: Nepal
- Zone: Janakpur Zone
- District: Dhanusa District

Population (1991)
  - Total: 4,119
- Time zone: UTC+5:45 (Nepal Time)

Kanakpatti is a village development committee in Dhanusa District in the Janakpur Zone of south-eastern Nepal. At the time of the 1991 Nepal census it had a population of 4,119 persons living in 680 individual households.
