= Aurahi Rural Municipality, Dhanusa =

Harushaha औरही Aaurahi
- Village committee
- Nickname: Aurahi gaupalika Dhanusha
- Interactive map of Harushaha
- Coordinates: 26.72°N 86.01°E
- Country: Nepal
- Province: Madhesh Province
- District: Dhanusa District

Population (2018)
  - Total: 9,765
- Time zone: UTC+5:45 (Nepal Time)

Aurahi (Harushaha) is a Village Development Committee in Dhanusa District in Madhesh Province of south-eastern Nepal. At the time of the 2018 Nepal census it had a population of 9,765 and had 1460 houses.
