= Inarwa, Dhanusha =

Inarwa इनर्वा
- Village
- Location in Nepal
- Coordinates: 26°30′N 86°50′E
- Country: Nepal
- Province: Province No. 2
- District: Dhanusha
- Rural Council: Janaknandini

Population (1991)
  - Total: 3,094
- Time zone: UTC+5:45 (Nepal Time)

Inarwa is a Village (previously: a VDC) in Janaknandini rural council of Dhanusha District in Province No. 2 of south-eastern Nepal. Inarwa belongs to ward no. 1 of the Janaknandini rural council. At the time of the 1991 Nepal census it had a population of 3,094.

== Transportation ==
Inarwa is served by a train station where Nepal Railway has regular services.
