= Dhalkebar =

Dhalkebar ढल्केवर
- neighborhood
- Location in Province Dhalkebar (Nepal)
- Coordinates: 26°56′N 85°57′E
- Country: Nepal
- Province: Province No. 2
- District: Dhanusa District
- Municipal area: Mithila Municipality

Population (2011)
  - Total: 11,445
- Time zone: UTC+5:45 (Nepal Time)

Dhalkebar is a neighborhood or town in Mithila Municipal Area lying on East-West Highway. Previously it was a separate village development committee in Dhanusa District. At the time of the 1991 Nepal census it had a population of 7,797 persons living in 1374 individual households.

On 2 December 2014 Mithila Municipality was declared merging Dhalkebar VDC, Begadawar VDC, Naktajhij VDC with it.

The 400-220 KV Dhalkebar substation over 13 bighas of land, built with an investment of Rs 2.20 billion by the Government of Nepal and Electricity Authority, is the first substation in Nepal based on the 400 KV system.
