= Mithileshwar Nikash =

Coordinates: 26.7600°N 85.9800°E

Mithileshwar Nikash मिथिलेश्वर निकाश
- Village development committee
- Interactive map of Mithileshwar Nikash
- Country: Nepal
- Zone: Janakpur Zone
- District: Dhanusa District

Population (1991)
  - Total: 4,847
- Time zone: UTC+5:45 (Nepal Time)

Mithileshwar Nikash - nicknamed purandaha - is a village development committee in Dhanusa District in the Janakpur Zone of South-Eastern Nepal. At the time of the 1991 Nepal census it had a population of 4,847 persons living in 923 individual households.
