= Yagyabhumi =

Yagyabhumi य‍ज्ञभुमी bhagwanpur,kisanpur,saraswatipur,kumahara and others
- Location in Nepal
- Coordinates: 26.90°N 86.05°E
- Country: Nepal
- Zone: Janakpur Zone
- District: Dhanusa District

Population (1991)
  - Total: 10,808
- Time zone: UTC+5:45 (Nepal Time)

Yagyabhumi is a town in Dhanusadham Municipality in Dhanusa District in the Janakpur Zone of south-eastern Nepal. The former village was merged on 18 May 2014 along with Govindapur, Umprempur, Yagyabhumi, and Dhanusadham village development committees (VDCs) to form the new municipality. Where ( kumahara,kisanpur,saraswatipur,bhagwanpur)and others village are listed on yagyabhumi At the time of the 1991 Nepal census it had a population of 10808 persons living in 2168 individual households.
