= Mithila Chaudhary =

Nepalese politician (1966–2022)

Mithila Chaudhary (Nepali: मिथिला चौधरी, 25 March 1966 – 10 June 2022) was a Nepalese politician and communist activist. She served in the 2nd Nepalese Constituent Assembly and as Minister for Population and Environment.

== Biography ==
Chaudhary was born on 25 March 1966 in Dhanusha, Nepal, and was raised in Bihar, India. Her parents were an Indian father and a Nepali mother.

Chaudhary married a member of the Communist Party of Nepal (Amatya), then herself joined the party. She lobbied for the establishment of the party’s women’s wing. During the movement against the Panchayat absolute monarchy in 1990, Chaudhary rallied fellow communist party members to protest after senior party leaders were arrested.

In 2001, Chaudhary suffered a heart attack.

Chaudhary became a member of the 2nd Nepalese Constituent Assembly (2014–2017) under the proportional representation quota. Chaudhary was appointed as Minister for Population and Environment in 2017. She represented Nepal at the 2017 United Nations Climate Change Conference (COP23) in Bonn, Germany, and announced that Nepal would embrace the concepts adopted by G77+China and the Least Developed Countries (LDCs) on climate change and its impact.. Nepal also became a member of the International Renewable Energy Agency (IRENA) during Chaudhary's time as Minister.

Chaudhary died on 10 June 2022, aged 57, at the All India Institute Of Medical Sciences (AIMS) in New Delhi, India, while undergoing cancer treatment.
