= Papikleshwar =

Papikleshwar पापिक्लेश्वर
- Village development committee
- Country: Nepal
- Zone: Janakpur Zone
- District: Dhanusa District

Population (1991)
  - Total: 4,101
- Time zone: UTC+5:45 (Nepal Time)

Papikleshwar is a village development committee in Dhanusa District in the Janakpur Zone of south-eastern Nepal. At the time of the 1991 Nepal census it had a population of 4,101 persons living in 691 individual households.
