= Kajara Ramaul =

Kajara Ramaul कजरा रमौल
- Village development committee
- Location in Nepal
- Coordinates: 26.48°N 86.50°E
- Country: Nepal
- Zone: Janakpur Zone
- District: Dhanusa District

Population (2011)
  - Total: 5,218
  - Density: 0.5/km^{2} (1.3/sq mi)
- Time zone: UTC+5:45 (Nepal Time)

Kajara Ramaul is a village development committee in Dhanusa District in the Janakpur Zone of south-eastern Nepal. At the time of the 2011 Nepal census it had a population of 5,218 persons living in 953 individual households.
