= Patanuka =

Patanuka पतनुका
- Village development committee
- Location in Nepal
- Coordinates: 26.66°N 86.14°E
- Country: Nepal
- Zone: Janakpur Zone
- District: Dhanusa District

Population (1991)
  - Total: 2,601
- Time zone: UTC+5:45 (Nepal Time)

Patanuka is a village development committee in Dhanusa District in the Janakpur Zone of south-eastern Nepal. At the time of the 1991 Nepal census it had a population of 2,601 living in 458 individual households.
