= Raghunathpur, Dhanusha =

Coordinates: 26.7600°N 85.9800°E

Raghunathpur रघुनाथपुर
- Village Development Committee
- Interactive map of Raghunathpur
- Country: Nepal
- Zone: Janakpur Zone
- District: Dhanusa District

Population (2011)
  - Total: 12,944
- Time zone: UTC+5:45 (Nepal Time)

Raghunathpur is a Village Development Committee in Dhanusa District in the Janakpur Zone of south-eastern Nepal. At the time of the 1991 Nepal census it had a population of 9,762 persons residing in 1962 individual households.
