= Thadi Jhijha =

Thadhi ठाढी
- Village
- Location in Madhesh Thadhi (Nepal)
- Coordinates: 26.67°N 86.09°E
- Country: Nepal
- Zone: Janakpur Zone
- District: Dhanusha District

Population (1991)
  - Total: 5,870
- Time zone: UTC+5:45 (Nepal Time)

Thadhi Jhijha is a Village in Bideha Municipality in Dhanusa District of the Madhesh Province of Nepal. At the time of the 1991 Nepal census it had a population of 5,870 persons living in 1021 individual households.
