= Kharihani =

Kharihani (population c. 2,500) is a village in the Dhanusa district of Nepal, in Janakpur Zone. Kharihani population is about 25000 people. Within the village, there are seven hamlets: Kharihani, Simradhi, Chotki Tole Simradhi, Hauwahi, Misarpatti, Amarkhana, and Geruwahi.
