= Bharatpur, Dhanusa =

Bharatpur, Dhanusa भरतपुर
- Village development committee
- Location in Nepal
- Coordinates: 26.90°N 86.08°E
- Country: Nepal
- Zone: Janakpur Zone
- District: Dhanusa District

Population (1991)
  - Total: 12,180
- Time zone: UTC+5:45 (Nepal Time)

Bharatpur is a village development committee in Dhanusa District in the Janakpur Zone of south-eastern Nepal. At the time of the 1991 Nepal census it had a population of 12,180 and had 2230 houses.
