= Paudeshwar =

Paudeshwar पौडेश्वर
- Village development committee
- Location in Nepal
- Coordinates: 26.72°N 86.00°E
- Country: Nepal
- Zone: Janakpur Zone
- District: Dhanusa District

Population (1991)
  - Total: 4,999
- Time zone: UTC+5:45 (Nepal Time)

Paudeshwar is a village development committee in Dhanusa District in the Janakpur Zone of south-eastern Nepal. At the time of the 1991 Nepal census it had a population of 4,999 persons living in 906 individual households.
