= Devpura Rupetha =

Devpura Rupaitha देवपुरा रुपैठा
- Janakpur Deputy Metropolitan city
- Location in Nepal
- Coordinates: 26.69°N 85.93°E
- Country: Nepal
- Zone: Janakpur Zone
- District: Dhanusa District

Government

Population (1991)
  - Total: 8,348
- Time zone: UTC+5:45 (Nepal Time)

Devpura Rupetha is a small town and village development committee in Dhanusa District of south-eastern Nepal. It is situated about 5.4 kilometres (3.4 mi) by road south of the city of Janakpur. As of 1991 it had a population of 8,348 persons living in 1,259 individual households.

== Landmarks ==
The main town contains Khana Pokhari Janakpur Hindu temple and Rupaitha education centre. The cemetery is Rupaitha Kabristhan to the west of the main town.
