= Lohana Bahbangama =

Coordinates: 26°42′N 85°58′E

Lohana Babhangama-25 BABHANGAMA Lohana
- Village development committee
- Nickname: Lomas
- Interactive map of Lohana Babhangama-25
- Country: Nepal
- Zone: Janakpur Zone
- District: Dhanusa District
- Established: 2074 BS

Population (2015)
  - Total: 8,000+
- Time zone: UTC+5:45 (Nepal Time)
- Postal code: 45600
- Website: www.sumi.jimdo.com

Lohana Bahbangama is a village development committee in Dhanusa District in the Janakpur Zone of south-eastern Nepal. At the time of the 1991 Nepal census it had a population of 4,772 persons living in 824 individual households. It is near to Janakpur. This village is surrounded by (Pra. ko. Mahuwa, Vail, Rampur, and Kuwa).
