= Bagchaura =

Coordinates: 26.77°N 86.02°E

Bagchaura बागचौरा
- Village development committee
- Interactive map of Bagchaura
- Country: Nepal
- Zone: Janakpur Zone
- District: Dhanusa District

Population (1991)
  - Total: 4,557
- Time zone: UTC+5:45 (Nepal Time)

Bagchaura is a village development committee in Dhanusa District in the Janakpur Zone of south-eastern Nepal. At the time of the 1991 Nepal census it had a population of 4,557 and had 812 houses.
