= Dubarikot Hathalekha =

Dubarikot Hathalekha दुबरीकोट हातलेखा
- Village development committee
- Location in Nepal
- Coordinates: 26.70°N 86.14°E
- Country: Nepal
- Zone: Janakpur Zone
- District: Dhanusa District

Population (1991)
  - Total: 5,394
- Time zone: UTC+5:45 (Nepal Time)

Dubarikot Hathalekha is a village development committee in the Dhanusa District, in the Janakpur Zone of south-eastern Nepal. At the time of the 1991 Nepal census it had a population of 5,394 persons living in 1011 individual households.
