= Hansapur Kathpula =

Village development committee in Janakpur Zone, Nepal

Hansapur Kathpula हसनपुर काठपुला
- Village development committee
- Location in Nepal
- Coordinates: 26.76°N 86.01°E
- Country: Nepal
- Zone: Janakpur Zone
- District: Dhanusa District

Population (1991)
  - Total: 3,969
- Time zone: UTC+5:45 (Nepal Time)

Hansapur Kathpula is a village development committee in Dhanusa District in the Janakpur Zone of south-eastern Nepal. At the time of the 1991 Nepal census it had a population of 3,969 persons living in 669 individual households. In this village Rajput population is approx 10%.
