= Suganikash =

Suganikash सुगानिकश
- Village development committee
- Location in Nepal
- Coordinates: 26.76°N 86.04°E
- Country: Nepal
- Zone: Janakpur Zone
- District: Dhanusa District

Population (1991)
  - Total: 3,137
- Time zone: UTC+5:45 (Nepal Time)

Suganikash is a village development committee in Dhanusa District in the Janakpur Zone of south-eastern Nepal. At the time of the 1991 Nepal census it had a population of at least 100 persons living in 524 individual households.
