= Mahendra Narayan Nidhi =

Nepali politician, democracy fighter and Gandhian leader

- महेन्द्र नारायण निधि

Minister of Water Resources and Local Development
- In office 19 April 1990 – 26 May 1991
- Monarch: King Birendra Bir Bikram Shah Dev
- Prime Minister: Krishna Prasad Bhattarai

Deputy Speaker of Pratinidhi Sabha
- In office 27 May 1959 – 15 December 1960
- Monarch: King Mahendra Bir Bikram Shah Dev
- Prime Minister: Bishweshwar Prasad Koirala

General Secretary of Nepali Congress
- In office 1991–1999

Personal details
- Born: 24 February 1922 Nagarain, Dhanusha, Nepal
- Died: 4 May 1999 (aged 77) Janakpur, Nepal
- Party: Nepali Congress
- Spouse: Prem Sagari Nidhi
- Children: Radha Nidhi, Janki Nidhi, Indu Nidhi, Navendra Nidhi, Bimalendra Nidhi, and Nira Nidhi.

Mahendra Narayan Nidhi (24 February 1922 – 4 May 1999) was a Nepali politician, democracy fighter, and Gandhian leader and advocacy of peaceful democratic struggles against autocratic governance. He was the Minister of water resources and local development in the Interim government led by Krishna Prasad Bhattarai after the success of 1990 Nepalese revolution.

Nidhi rose to the position of party General Secretary but faced barriers to higher leadership, which observers in Madhesh attributed to biases against Madhesi figures within the Nepali Congress. He started his active political journey from Dhanusha in 1946. Nidhi was elected twice to the parliament, in 1959 and 1991. He was the first deputy speaker of Pratinidhi Sabha of Nepal in 1959. Nidhi had started Rajeshwor Nidhi Higher Secondary School during the Rana period in Nagrain, Dhanusha.

== Personal life ==
Nidhi was born in 1922 in Nagarain, Dhanusha.

== Honors ==
- 2018 — Rastra Gaurav Man Padavi

== See also ==
- Mahendra Narayan Nidhi Awas Yojana
