= Gopalpur, Nepal =

Gopalpur, Nepal गोपालपुर
- Village development committee
- Location in Nepal
- Coordinates: 27°11′N 86°07′E
- Country: Nepal
- Zone: Janakpur Zone
- District: Dhanusa District

Population (1991)
  - Total: 4,076
- Time zone: UTC+5:45 (Nepal Time)

Gopalpur is a village development committee in Dhanusa District in the Janakpur Zone of south-eastern Nepal. At the time of the 1991 Nepal census it had a population of 4,076 persons living in 709 individual households.
