= Dhanusadham =

Dhanushadham धनुषाधाम नगरपालिका
- Municipality
- Location in Nepal
- Coordinates: 26.84°N 86.07°E
- Country: Nepal
- Province: Province No. 2
- District: Dhanusa

Government
  - Mayor: Baleshwor Mandal (NC)
  - Deputy Mayor: Bidya Devi Bhujel (NC)

Population (1991)
  - Total: 6,450
- Time zone: UTC+5:45 (NST)
- Website: www.dhanushadhammun.gov.np/en

Dhanushadham is a municipality in Dhanusha District in Province No. 2 of south-eastern Nepal. The municipality was established on 18 May 2014 by merging the existing Govindapur, Umprempur, Yagyabhumi, Dhanushadham village development committees (VDCs). It is a religious place of Hindu worship in Nepal. It is believed that a part of Shiva Dhanusha (Bow of God Shiva) that was broken by Rama during Sita's swayamvara, is housed. Now there is temple around the remaining of bow and visited by Hindu devotees from all over the world. That's why it is named Dhanushadham.

Every year there is a festival on the occasion of Makar Sakranti and devotee offers prayer to the Dhanusha temple. The place is 18 km from Janakpur and there is concrete road connecting Dhanushadham to Janakpur. It can be reached by car, motorbike, bus and so on. The travel by bus takes 45 minutes from Janakpur.

At the time of the 1991 Nepal census, it had a population of 6,450 persons living in 1,267 individual households.
