= Paterwa, Dhanusha =

Paterwa पटेर्वा
- Village development committee
- Location in Nepal
- Coordinates: 26.80°N 86.12°E
- Country: Nepal
- Zone: Janakpur Zone
- District: Dhanusa District

Population (1991)
  - Total: 3,364
- Time zone: UTC+5:45 (Nepal Time)

Paterwa is a village development committee in Dhanusa District in the Janakpur Zone of south-eastern Nepal. At the time of the 1991 Nepal census it had a population of 3,364 persons living in 589 individual households.
