= Tarapatti Sirsiya =

Tarapatti Sirsiya तारापट्टी सिर्सिया
- Village development committee
- Location in Nepal
- Coordinates: 26.80°N 85.99°E
- Country: Nepal
- Zone: Janakpur Zone
- District: Dhanusa District

Population (1991)
  - Total: 6,271
- Time zone: UTC+5:45 (Nepal Time)

Tarapatti Sirsiya is a village development committee in Dhanusa District in the Janakpur Zone of south-eastern Nepal. At the time of the 1991 Nepal census it had a population of 6,271 persons living in 1108 individual households.
