= Harine =

Kamala Nagarpalika - 8 कमला नगरपालिका - ८
- Ward number eight of kamala municipality
- Location in Nepal
- Coordinates: 26.74°N 86.15°E
- Country: Nepal
- Zone: Janakpur
- District: Dhanusha

Government
  - Type: Hybrid regime
  - Ward president: Rajeshwar Marik

Population (1991)
  - Total: 4,346
- Time zone: UTC+5:45 (Nepal Time)

Harine was a village development committee in Dhanusha District in the Janakpur Zone of south-eastern Nepal. At the time of the 1991 Nepal census it had a population of 4,346 persons living in 779 individual households. In the present context, it is the ward number eight of kamala municipality which includes Teraha, sonapada and Harine village.

There are two government schools in this ward. One is up to class 10th named Shree Madhiyamik Vidhalaye situated in the border of Teraha and Sonapada villages. Another is up to Five situated in Harine.

Proper management of school is not looked and arranged by ward president as well school chief.

People of all these villages are facing various problems in their daily life. Mostly people of these ward are farmers. Many youths are abroad in foreign employee.

People of this ward are associated with different political parties of Nepal.
