= Rampur Birta, Dhanusha =

Rampur Birta रामपूर विर्ता
- City
- Country: Nepal
- Zone: Janakpur Zone
- District: Dhanusa District

Population (1991)
  - Total: 4,006
- Time zone: UTC+5:45 (Nepal Time)

Rampur Burta is a Village Development Committee in Dhanusa District in the Janakpur Zone of south-eastern Nepal. At the time of the 1991 Nepal census, it had a population of 4,006 persons residing in 721 individual households.
