= Machijhitakaiya =

Machijhitakaiya माची झिटकैहिया
- Village development committee
- Location in Nepal
- Country: Nepal
- Zone: Janakpur Zone
- District: Dhanusa District

Population (1991)
  - Total: 7,318
- Time zone: UTC+5:45 (Nepal Time)

Machijhitakaiya is a village development committee in Dhanusa District in the Janakpur Zone of south-eastern Nepal. At the time of the 1991 Nepal census it had a population of 7,318 persons living in 1440 individual households.
