= Lakshmipur Bagewa =

Coordinates: 26°47′N 85°57′E

Lakshmipur Bagewa लक्ष्मीपुर बगेवा
- Village development committee
- Interactive map of Lakshmipur Bagewa
- Country: Nepal
- Zone: Janakpur Zone
- District: Dhanusa District

Population (1991)
  - Total: 5,490
- Time zone: UTC+5:45 (Nepal Time)

Lakshmipur Bagewa is a village development committee in Dhanusa District in the Janakpur Zone of south-eastern Nepal. At the time of the 1991 Nepal census it had a population of 5,490 persons living in 950 individual households. It has one government school, Sri Lakshminiya Janta Madhyamik Vidhiyalaya.
