= Godar =

Village development committee in Janakpur Zone, Nepal

Godar गोदार
- Village development committee
- Location in Nepal
- Coordinates: 26.96°N 86.14°E
- Country: Nepal
- Zone: Janakpur Zone
- District: Dhanusa District

Population (1991)
  - Total: 6,390
- Time zone: UTC+5:45 (Nepal Time)

Godar is a Municipality in the Dhanusa District in the Janakpur Zone of southeastern Nepal. At the time of the 1991 Nepal census it had a population of 6,390 persons living in 1290 individual households.
