= Mithileshwar Mauwahi =

Coordinates: 26.7600°N 85.9800°E

Mithileshwar Mauwahi मिथिलेश्वर मौवाही
- Village development committee
- Interactive map of Mithileshwar Mauwahi
- Country: Nepal
- Zone: Janakpur Zone
- District: Dhanusa District

Population (1991)
  - Total: 3,082
- Time zone: UTC+5:45 (Nepal Time)

Mithileshwar Mauwahi is a village development committee in Dhanusa District in the Janakpur Zone of south-eastern Nepal. At the time of the 1991 Nepal census it had a population of 3,082 persons living in 590 individual households.
