= Basahiya =

Ward in Janakpur, Nepal

Basahiya बसहिया
- Ward no. 24 of Janakpur of sub-metropolitan city
- Location in Nepal
- Coordinates: 26.70°N 85.91°E
- Country: Nepal
- Zone: Janakpur Zone
- District Dhanusha: Dhanusa District

Government

Population (1991)
  - Total: 4,487
- Time zone: UTC+5:45 (Nepal Time)
- Postal code: +9779812113845

Basahiya is 24th ward of Janakpur sub-metropolitan city. It is located in the Dhanusha District of province No 2. At the time of the 1991 Nepal census, it had a population of 4,542 and 737 homes, and the total geographical area of the village was 501.56 hectares (5.0156 square kilometers). Basahiya has four government schools, three primary schools, and one secondary school. The majority of the population is Hindu and few are Muslims. The native language of Basahiya is Maithili. The climate is moderate and the land is suitable for tillage. Basahiya has one hospital and one veterinary clinic. It is religiously and spiritually important place for the visitors as the Lord's sita's Basgari took place here. The religious Doodhmati river and historical Balthara pond are other important site of attraction.

== History ==
There is evidence that indicate Balthra is the first site of this village. The name Basahiya is derived from the Hindu marriage custom known as basgari, which is related to the marriage of Lord Sita. There is a belief among locals that Basahiya was established by a sadhu who placed their kutti at Balthara Pond and that the relatives of this sadhu are still present in the village. Residents worship their ancestors every year at the pond. It is said that the sadhu had gone into pond's water For seven days and then he finally gets water mausoleum. Since then some kind of spiritual waves are being realized here.

The ancient Guthi of Basahiya was also named after this Balthara Pond, as indicated by Balthara Birtha Guthi in the Tama Patra of बसहिया मंठ. A sculpture of Baal Bhagwan (Child Krishna), believed to be made of precious metals, was found here and later removed by the government. In recent election 2082 approximately 6000 voter in Janakpurdham-24.
