= Manish Jha =

Manish Jha may refer to:

- Manish Jha (director)
- Manish Jha (politician)
