= Bindhi =

Bindhi बिन्धी
- Village development committee
- Location in Nepal
- Coordinates: 26.71°N 85.90°E
- Country: Nepal
- Zone: Janakpur Zone
- District: Dhanusa District

Population (1991)
  - Total: 4,409
- Time zone: UTC+5:45 (Nepal Time)

Bindhi is a village development committee in Dhanusa District in the Janakpur Zone of south-eastern Nepal. At the 1991 Nepal census, it had a population of 4,409 persons living.

In National Population and Housing Census 2011, The number of houses in Bindhi increased to 1,192 total houses, where 1,148 were owned, 17 were rented, 5 institutional and 22 others. Whereas, 148 were mud bonded (bricks/stone), 434 cement bonded (bricks/stone), 117 RCC with pillar, 382 Wooden pillar, 104 others and 7 not stated.

The village is still undeveloped with no proper availability of drinking water, fuel, toilet and electricity.
