= Thilla Yaduwa =

Thilla Yaduwa ठील्ला यदुवा
- Village development committee
- Location in Nepal
- Coordinates: 26.79°N 86.10°E
- Country: Nepal
- Zone: Janakpur Zone
- District: Dhanusa District

Population (1991)
  - Total: 2,740
- Time zone: UTC+5:45 (Nepal Time)

Thilla Yaduwa is a village development committee in Dhanusa District in the Janakpur Zone of south-eastern Nepal. At the time of the 1991 Nepal census it had a population of 2,740 persons living in 503 individual households.
