= Mansingpatti =

Mansingpatti मानसिंङपट्टी
- Village development committee
- Location in Nepal
- Coordinates: 26.74°N 85.97°E
- Country: Nepal
- Zone: Janakpur Zone
- District: Dhanusa District

Population (1991)
  - Total: 3,293
- Time zone: UTC+5:45 (Nepal Time)

Mansingpatti is a village development committee in Dhanusa District in the Janakpur Zone of south-eastern Nepal. At the time of the 1991 Nepal census it had a population of 3,293 persons living in 567 individual households.
