= Nepali Congress (Deuba Faction) =

Nepali Congress (Deuba faction) नेपाली काँग्रेस (देउवा पक्ष)
- Leader: Bimalendra Nidhi; Krishna Prasad Sitaula; Prakash Man Singh
- President: Sher Bahadur Deuba
- Chairman: Shashanka Koirala
- Founded: 2026
- Split from: Nepali Congress
- Headquarters: Chundevi, Kathmandu
- Ideology: Social democracy

Nepali Congress (Deuba faction) (Nepali: नेपाली काँग्रेस (देउवा पक्ष) is a faction of political party in Nepal, which was formed in 2026 due to a vertical split of the original Nepali Congress. While the Supreme Court handed over original Nepali Congress to Gagan Thapa, while this faction stood with Sher Bahadur Deuba. Later a faction led by influencial leaders like former vice president Purna Bahadur Khadka, Bal Krishna Khand and others re-aligned with original party led by Thapa. Recently, the faction has been doing separate General Convention to make a separate party.

== See also ==
- Sher Bahadur Deuba
- Bimalendra Nidhi
- Nepali Congress
