= Mithila Bihari =

Mithila Bihari मिथिला बिहारी नगरपालिका मि. बि. न. पा., तारापट्टी, धनुषा
- Municipality
- Municipality in Nepal
- Location in Nepal
- Coordinates: 26.95°N 86.88°E
- Country: Nepal
- Development Region: Central
- Zone: Janakpur
- District: Dhanusa
- Province: Madhesh
- Established: 2016 A.D. (2073 B.S.)

Government
  - Mayor: Rajendra Prasad Yadav (NC)
  - Deputy Mayor: Shobha Devi Sah

Area
  - Total: 37.60 km^{2} (14.52 sq mi)

Population (2021)
  - Total: 37,276
  - Density: 991.4/km^{2} (2,568/sq mi)
  - Religions: Hindu Muslim Christian

Languages
  - Local: Maithili, Tharu, Nepali, Magahi
- Time zone: UTC+5:45 (NST)
- Postal Code: 45600
- Area code: 041
- Website: www.mithilabiharimun.gov.np

Mithila Bihari (Nepali: मिथिला बिहारी) is a municipality in Danusha District in Madhesh Province of Nepal. It was formed in 2016 occupying current 10 Sections (Wards) from previous 10 VDCs. It occupies an area of 37.60 km^{2} with a total population of 37,276. Dhanusha district, located in the central part of the Janakpur region, which is one of the development regions of Nepal, is bordered by southern India. There are 18 local levels located in the central part of the Dhanusha district, which were part of the Madhyamanchal Development Region. Among them, six Village Development Committees (VDCs) - Bhutahi Paterwa, Mithileshwar Nikas, Andupatti, Tarapatti Sirsiya, and Mithileshwar Mauwahi - have been merged to form the Mithila Bihari Municipality under the Madhesh Province of Nepal as of Falgun 27, 2073 B.S. Despite being situated in the easily accessible terrain of the Terai region in terms of geographical features, Mithila state has a densely populated settlement from the perspective of human development indicators and progress. In the historic pilgrimage of Mithila state, which includes two main Dolis (Processions) or travel camps, such as the Mela, established with the name of Lord Bihari from Mithila Bihari, the city of Janakpur, which is recognized as the holy place of the Hindu religion, meaning the father-in-law's place of Lord Ram, has given additional identity to the Mithila Bihari. From a religious point of view, Mithila Bihari has been named after Lord Ram, who is historically recognized, which has resulted in the naming of this local place as Mithila Bihari. Published in the Rajpatra on Jestha 11, 2074 B.S., upgrading the Mithila Bihari Rural Municipality to the Municipality level was not possible, but an interim order of the Supreme Court issued on Bhadra 27, 2074 B. S. resulted in the transformation of Mithila Bihari Rural Municipality into a Municipality.
