= Giddha, Nepal =

Coordinates: 26.7600°N 85.9800°E

Giddha, Nepal गिद्धा
- Municipality
- Interactive map of Giddha, Nepal
- Country: Nepal
- Zone: Janakpur Zone
- District: Dhanusa District

Population (1991)
  - Total: 4,147
- Time zone: UTC+5:45 (Nepal Time)

Giddha is a village development committee in Dhanusa District in the Janakpur Zone of south-eastern Nepal Municipality called Videha. At the time of the 1991 Nepal census it had a population of 4,147 persons living in 714 individual households.

Giddha is a village in Mithila region of Nepal. Mithila has a rich history dating back thousands of years. It is mentioned in ancient Hindu scriptures, and it is believed to be the birthplace of Sita, the wife of Lord Rama, a central figure in the Ramayana.

== Art and Culture ==
Mithila is renowned for its unique art form called "Madhubani painting" or "Mithila painting." This traditional art involves intricate and colorful designs and is often created on walls, paper, or cloth. These paintings often depict Hindu mythological themes.

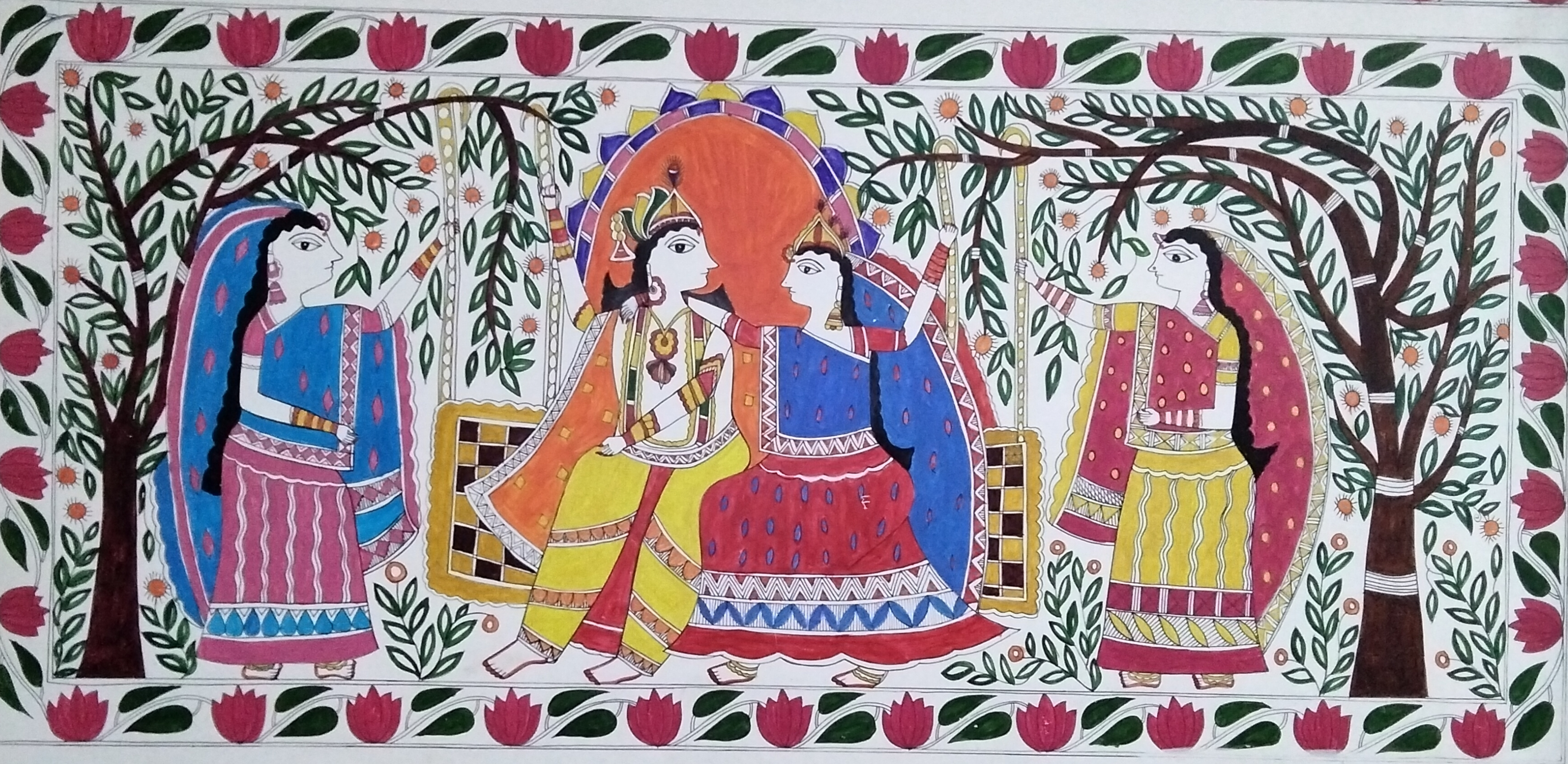
Mithila Painting

== Language ==
The primary language spoken in Mithila is Maithili. It has its own script and is an important part of the region's identity.
