= Mahuwa (Pra. Ko) =

Coordinates: 26°42′N 85°59′E

Mahuwa महुवा
- Village development committee
- Interactive map of Mahuwa
- Country: Nepal
- Zone: Janakpur Zone
- District: Dhanusa District

Population (1991)
  - Total: 5,194
- Time zone: UTC+5:45 (Nepal Time)

Mahuwa is a village development committee in Dhanusa District in the Janakpur Zone of south-eastern Nepal. At the time of the 1991 Nepal census it had a population of 5,194.
