= Makhanaha, Dhanusha =

Coordinates: 26.80°N 86.08°E

Makhanaha मखनाहा
- City
- Interactive map of Makhanaha
- Country: Nepal
- Zone: Janakpur Zone
- District: Dhanusa District

Population (1991)
  - Total: 6,059
- Time zone: UTC+5:45 (Nepal Time)

Makhanaha is a Village Development Committee in Dhanusa District in the Janakpur Zone of south-eastern Nepal. At the time of the 1991 Nepal census it had a population of 6,059.
