= Mowa, Gujarat =

Human settlement in western India

See Mowa for namesakes

Mowa (also called Mahuva) is a village and Rajput former petty princely state in Gujarat, western India.

It lies in Halar prant on Saurashtra peninsula.

== History ==
Mowa (Mahuva) was a petty princely state, comprising solely the village, in the Halar prant of Kathiawar. It was ruled by Jhala Rajput Chieftains.

Mowa had a population of 247 in 1901, yielding a state revenue of 3,322 Rupees (1903–4, mostly from land) and a paying a tribute of 158 Rupees, to the British and Junagadh State.

== External links and Sources ==
History

- Imperial Gazetteer, on dsal.uchicago.edu
