= Baheda Bela =

Baheda Bela panchayat बहेडा बेला
- Village development committee
- Location in Nepal
- Coordinates: 26.61°N 85.90°E
- Country: Nepal
- Zone: Janakpur Zone
- District: Dhanusa District

Population (2011)
  - Total: 6,983
- Time zone: UTC+5:45 (Nepal Time)

Baheda Bela is a village development committee in Dhanusa District in the Janakpur Zone of south-eastern Nepal. At the time of the 2011 Nepal census it had a population of 6,983.
