= Lakhauri =

Lakhauri लखौरी
- Village development committee
- Location in Nepal
- Coordinates: 26.68°N 86.01°E
- Country: Nepal
- Zone: Janakpur Zone
- District: Dhanusa District

Population (1991)
  - Total: 2,882
- Time zone: UTC+5:45 (Nepal Time)

Lakhauri is a rural municipality in Dhanusa District in the Janakpur Zone of south-eastern Nepal. At the time of the 1991 Nepal census, it had 2,882 people living in 505 households.
