= Lakshminibas =

Coordinates: 26°54′N 85°55′E

Lakshminibas लक्ष्मीनिवास
- Village development committee
- Interactive map of Lakshminibas
- Country: Nepal
- Zone: Janakpur Zone
- District: Dhanusa District

Population (1991)
  - Total: 2,656
- Time zone: UTC+5:45 (Nepal Time)

Lakshminibas is a village development committee in Dhanusa District in the Janakpur Zone of south-eastern Nepal. At the time of the 1991 Nepal census it had a population of 2,656 persons living in 459 individual households.
