= Tulsiyani Jabdi =

Tulsiyahi Jabdi तुल्सियाही जब्दी
- Village development committee
- Location in Nepal
- Coordinates: 26.61°N 85.87°E
- Country: Nepal
- Zone: Janakpur Zone
- District: Dhanusha District

Population (1991)
  - Total: 4,459
- Time zone: UTC+5:45 (Nepal Time)

Tulsiyahi Jabdi is a village development committee in Dhanusa District in the Janakpur Zone of south-eastern Nepal. In the 1991 Nepal census, it had a population of 4,459 persons living in 795 individual households.
