= Siddha, Dhanusha =

Siddha, Nepal सिद्धा
- City
- Country: Nepal
- Zone: Janakpur Zone
- District: Dhanusa District

Population (1991)
  - Total: 5,059
- Time zone: UTC+5:45 (Nepal Time)

Siddha is a Village Development Committee in Dhanusa District in the Janakpur Zone of south-eastern Nepal. At the time of the 1991 Nepal census it had a population of 5,059.
