= Nakatajhijh =

Village development committee in Janakpur Zone, Nepal

Nakatajhijh नकटाझिझि
- Village development committee
- Location in Nepal
- Coordinates: 27.00°N 85.98°E
- Country: Nepal
- Zone: Janakpur Zone
- District: Dhanusa District

Population (1991)
  - Total: 7,190
- Time zone: UTC+5:45 (Nepal Time)

Nakatajhijh is a village development committee in Dhanusa District in the Janakpur Zone of south-eastern Nepal. At the time of the 1991 Nepal census, it had a population of 7,190 persons living in 1246 individual households.
