= Baphai =

Baphai बफै
- Village development committee
- Location in Nepal
- Coordinates: 26.71°N 86.06°E
- Country: Nepal
- Zone: Janakpur Zone
- District: Dhanusa District

Population (1991)
  - Total: 2,207
- Time zone: UTC+5:45 (Nepal Time)

Baphai is a village development committee in Dhanusa District in the Janakpur Zone of south-eastern Nepal. At the time of the 1991 Nepal census it had a population of 2,207 and had 373 houses.
