= Ballagoth =

Village development committee in Janakpur Zone, Nepal

Ballagoth बल्लागोठ
- Village development committee
- Location in Nepal
- Coordinates: 26.64°N 86.13°E
- Country: Nepal
- Zone: Janakpur Zone
- District: Dhanusa District

Population (1991)
  - Total: 3,265
- Time zone: UTC+5:45 (Nepal Time)

Ballagoth is a village development committee in Dhanusa District in the Janakpur Zone of south-eastern Nepal. At the time of the 1991 Nepal census it had a population of 3,265 and had 543 houses.
