= Lagmagadha Guthi =

Coordinates: 26°39′N 85°57′E

Lagmagadha Guthi लगमागढ गुठी
- Village Development Committee
- Interactive map of Lagmagadha Guthi
- Country: Nepal
- Zone: Janakpur Zone
- District: Dhanusa District
- No.: 7

Population
  - Total: 3,726
- Time zone: UTC+5:45 (Nepal Time)

Lagmamdha Guthi, often shortened to 'Lagma', is a Village Development Committee (VDC) in Dhanusa District in the Janakpur Zone of south-eastern Nepal. At the time of the 1991 Nepal census, it had a population of 3,726 people living in 663 individual households.

== Neighborhoods ==
Lagma has two prominent neighborhoods commonly called Lagma East and Lagma West; the latter being divided from the former by its larger Islamic population. The major livelihoods for residents of Lagma are Fishing and Livestock; mainly the keeping of cattle animals, goats and duck.

== Food ==
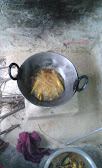
Lagma Pond Fish Fry

== Water ==
Nagrain is the marketplace for most of Lagma dwellers and the surrounding VDC. Initially, Lagma depended on ponds for water. However, due to the increased supply of narrow tube wells with manual pumps, locally known as "kael". The quality of the water is somewhat improved compared to ponds. Initially, individuals collected water from the same pond for both household and drinking use, while those who do the laundry let the water drain back into the same pond. This resulted in widespread water borne diseases and children's health suffered badly. With no alternative, people continued to drink from the same dirty pond. Ponds are privately owned by so-called "Zamindars", who have financial stakes in them.
