= Bahuarba =

Bahuarwa बहुअर्वा
- Village development committee
- Location in eastern south of Nepal border of Bihar
- Coordinates: 26.68°N 85.96°E
- Country: Nepal
- Zone: Janakpur Zone
- District: Dhanusa District

Population (1991)
  - Total: 3,602
- Time zone: UTC+5:45 (Nepal Time)
- Area code: 03

Bahuarwa is a village development committee in Dhanusa District in the Janakpur Zone of south-eastern Nepal. At the time of the 2014 Nepal census it had a population of 10235 and had 1024 houses.
