= Phulgama =

Phulgama फुलगामा Bahiri Phulgama Nepal
- Nagarain Municipality Ward no. - 3,4 and 5 now
- Location in Nepal
- Coordinates: 26.64°N 85.91°E
- Country: Nepal
- Zone: Janakpur Zone
- District: Dhanusa District

Population (1991)
  - Total: 8,564
- Time zone: UTC+5:45 (Nepal Time)

Phulgama is a ward of Nagarain Municipality in Dhanusa District in the Janakpur Zone of south-eastern Nepal. At the time of the 1991 Nepal census it had a population of 8,564 persons living in 1539 individual households.

== History ==
Phulgama is situated 9 km south of the contemporary king Rajarshi Janak's capital Janakpur. It is believed that the princess Sita used to collect flowers to worship in Girija Sthaan, which is why it was given the name Phulgama.
