= Baniniya, Dhanusha =

Baniniya बनिनिया
- Village development committee
- Location in Nepal
- Coordinates: 26.80°N 85.96°E
- Country: Nepal
- Zone: Janakpur Zone
- District: Dhanusa District

Population (1991)
  - Total: 3,255
- Time zone: UTC+5:45 (Nepal Time)

Baniniya is a village development committee in Dhanusa District in the Janakpur Zone of south-eastern Nepal. At the time of the 1991 Nepal census it had a population of 3,255 and had 561 houses.
