= Begadawar =

Bengadawar
- Village development committee
- Location in Nepal
- Coordinates: 26.97°N 85.93°E
- Country: Nepal
- Zone: Janakpur Zone
- District: Dhanusa District

Population (1991)
  - Total: 8,145
- Time zone: UTC+5:45 (Nepal Time)

Kisannagar a village development committee of the Dhanusa District in the Janakpur Zone of Nepal. At the time of the 1991 Nepal census it had a population of 8,145 and had 1543 houses.
