= Pambaiyeh =

Pambaiyeh پامبائيه
- Village
- Location within Iran
- Coordinates: 30°30′38″N 54°41′06″E
- Country: Iran
- Province: Kerman
- County: Shahr-e Babak
- Bakhsh: Dehaj
- Rural District: Khabar

Population (2006)
  - Total: 129
- Time zone: UTC+3:30 (IRST)
  - Summer (DST): UTC+4:30 (IRDT)

Pambaiyeh (Persian: پامبائيه, also Romanized as Pambā’īyeh; also known as Mahvā, Mahwa, Pambeh, Pamvā, Pomvāyeh, Pumbeh, and Pūmvā) is a village in Khabar Rural District, Dehaj District, Shahr-e Babak County, Kerman Province, Iran. At the 2006 census, its population was 129, in 25 families.
