= Khajuri Chanha =

Village development committee in Janakpur Zone, Nepal

Khajuri Chanha खजुरी चन्हा
- Village development committee
- Location in Nepal
- Coordinates: 26.66°N 86.12°E
- Country: Nepal
- Zone: Janakpur Zone
- District: Dhanusa District

Population (1991)
  - Total: 5,215
- Time zone: UTC+5:45 (Nepal Time)

Khajuri Chanha is a village development committee in Dhanusa District in the Janakpur Zone of south-eastern Nepal. At the time of the 1991 Nepal census it had a population of 5,215 persons living in 965 individual households.

== Transport ==
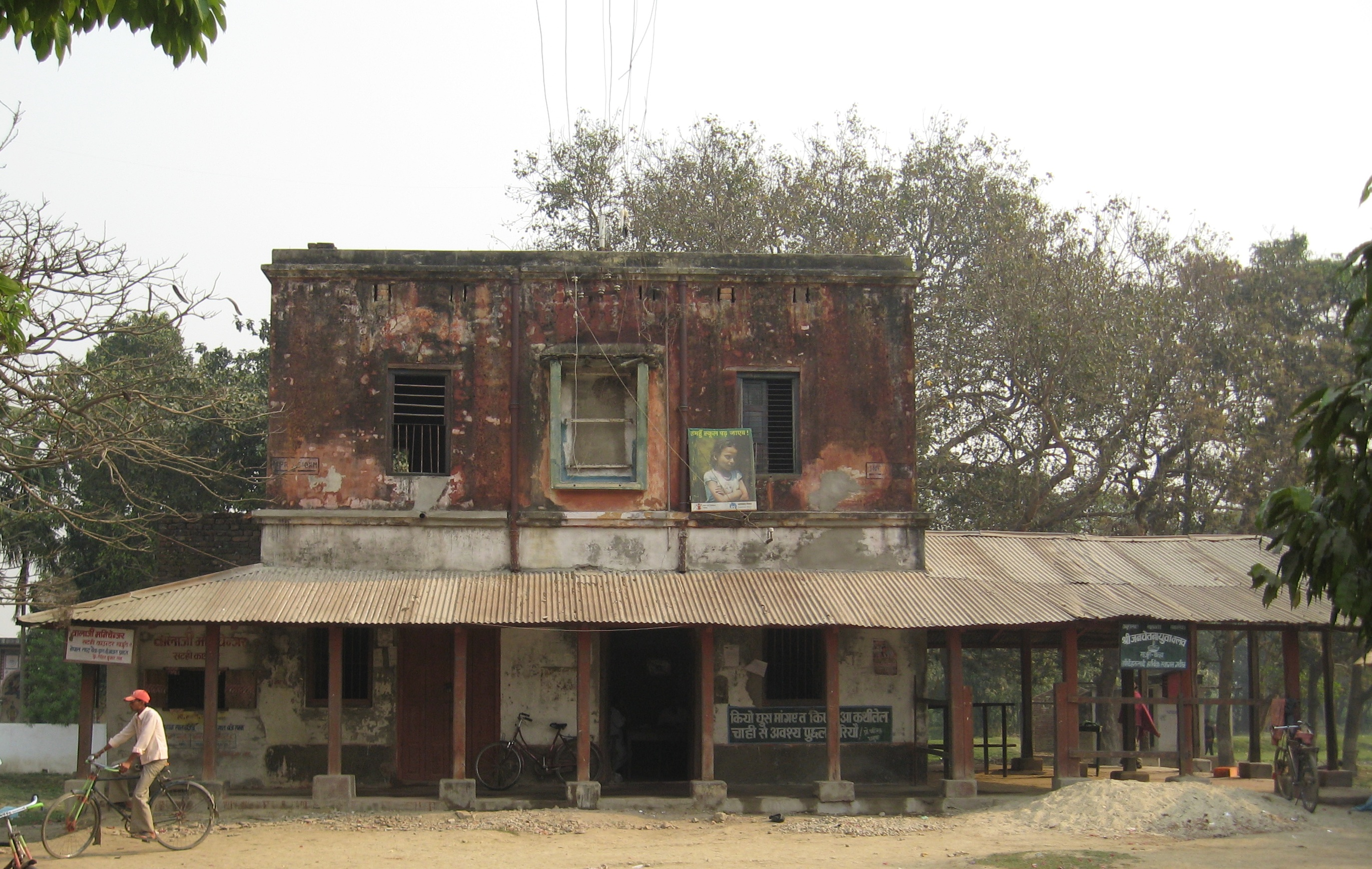
Old train station building at Khajuri.

Khajuri Chanha is served by Khajuri railway station where Nepal Railways provides regular services.
