= Tattama =

Hindu caste found in the state of Bihar in India

Regions with significant populations
- India

Languages
- Maithili, Hindi

Related ethnic groups
- Panika, Koshta

The Tattama, also known as Tatma, are a low-status caste in the Indian state of Bihar whose members were originally weavers.
