= Mowa, Chhattisgarh =

Mowa
- Town
- Location in Chhattisgarh, India Mowa (India)
- Coordinates: 21.275101°N 81.667648°E
- Country: India
- State: Chhattisgarh
- District: Raipur

Population (2001)
  - Total: 13,697

Languages
  - Official: Hindi, Chhattisgarhi
- Time zone: UTC+5:30 (IST)
- Vehicle registration: CG

Mowa is a census town in Raipur district in the Indian state of Chhattisgarh.

== Demographics ==
As of 2001 India census, Mowa had a population of 130,697. Males constitute 53% of the population and females 47%. Mowa has an average literacy rate of 66%, higher than the national average of 59.5%: male literacy is 74%, and female literacy is 57%. In Mowa, 16% of the population is under 6 years of age.
