= Mahuwa (Pra. Khe) =

Coordinates: 26°38′N 86°7′E

Mahuwa (Pra. Khe) महुवा प्र खे
- Village development committee
- Interactive map of Mahuwa (Pra. Khe)
- Country: Nepal
- Zone: Janakpur Zone
- District: Dhanusa District

Population (1991)
  - Total: 4,439
- Time zone: UTC+5:45 (Nepal Time)

Mahuwa is a village development committee in Dhanusa District in the Janakpur Zone of south-eastern Nepal. At the time of the 1991 Nepal census it had a population of 4,439.
