= Ram Saroj Yadav =

MPA of Madhesh Province

Honourable Ram Saroj Yadav
- राम सरोज यादब
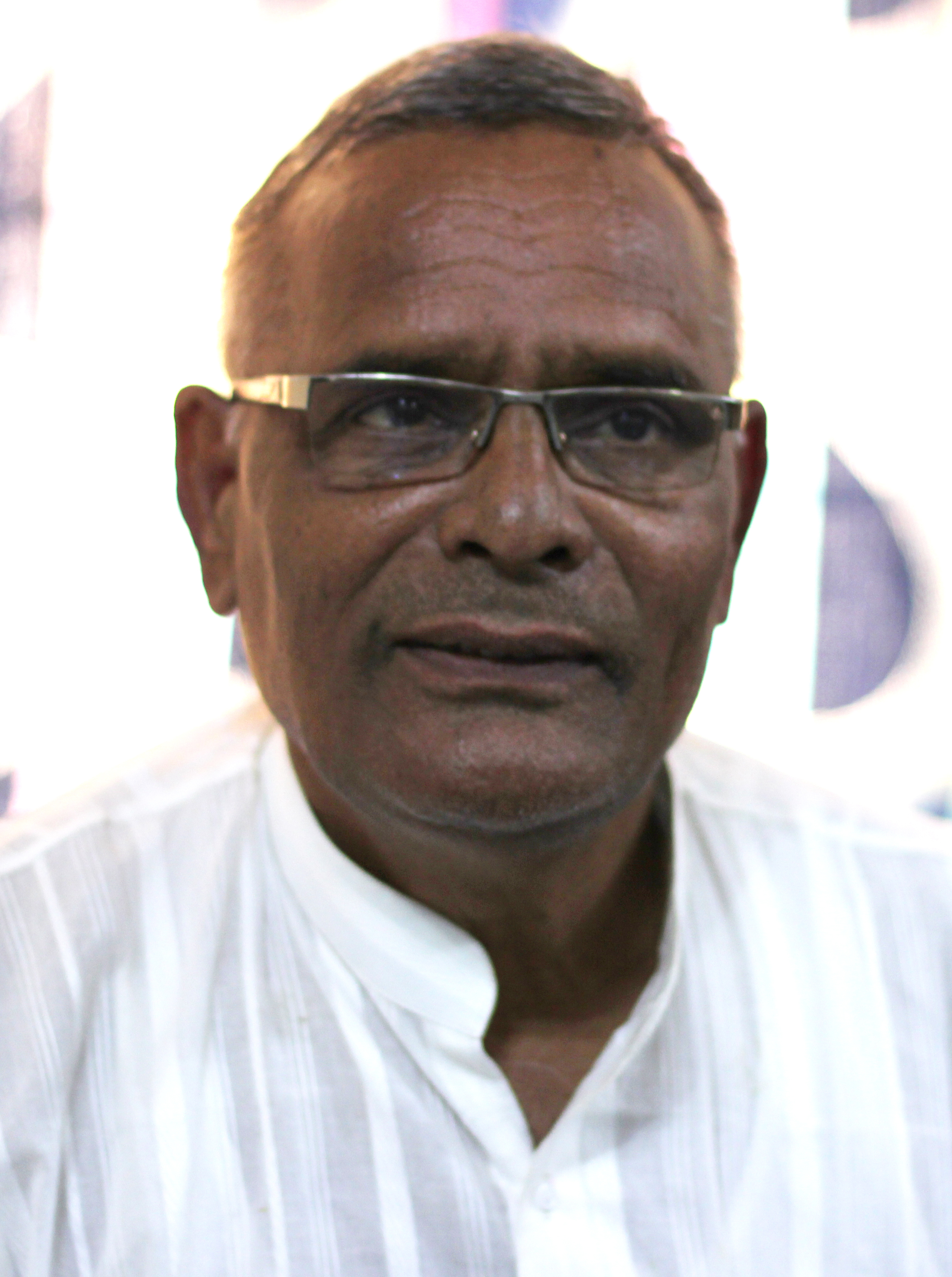
- Yadav in 2019

1st Deputy Chief Minister of Madhesh Province
- In office 9 June 2021 – 14 October 2022
- Governor: Hari Shankar Mishra
- Chief Minister: Lalbabu Raut
- Preceded by: Constitution Created

Minister for Physical Infrastructure of Madhesh Province
- In office 9 June 2021 – 14 October 2022
- Governor: Hari Shankar Mishra
- Chief Minister: Lalbabu Raut
- Preceded by: Jitendra Prasad Sonal
- Succeeded by: Saroj Kumar Yadav

Member of the Madhesh Provincial Assembly
- Incumbent
- Assumed office 2018
- Preceded by: Constituency Created
- Constituency: Dhanusha 3(A)

Constituent Assembly Member
- In office 2008–2013
- Constituency: Proportional list

Personal details
- Born: 18 November 1953 (age 72) Bahiri, Dhanusha, Nepal
- Party: Nepali Congress
- Website: mopid.p2.gov.np

Ram Saroj Yadav is a Nepalese politician and member of Provincial Assembly. Yadav was also the parliamentary party leader for the Nepali Congress in the Provincial Assembly and Minister for Physical Infrastructure Development of Madhesh Province. He is also an expeditionary of Maithili language and had come in light after demanding it as official language of Madhesh Province.

Yadav, a resident of Dhanusha, was elected to the 2017 and 2022 provincial assembly elections from Dhanusha3(A).

== Personal life ==
Ram Saroj Yadav was born in a Yadav family in Bahiri of Dhanusha district on 18 November 1953.

== Political career ==
He came in active politics while he was studying at RRM Campus, Janakpur. He has also served as the chairman of District Development Committee, Dhanusha.

Yadav was unable to win election in Second CA election 2070 with narrow vote difference when he was fielded as candidate from Dhanusha 4. He is the leader of Nepali Congress parliamentary party in Provincial Assembly of Madhesh Province.

On 9 June 2021, he joined LalBabu Raut ministry as minister of Physical Infrastructure along with 2 more legislators from Nepali Congress. He is supposed to be a person close to Nepali Congress former Vice-president Bimalendra Nidhi.

== Electoral history ==
=== 2022 Nepalese provincial elections ===
Dhanusha 3(A)
Party	Candidate	Votes
Nepali Congress	Ram Saroj Yadav	17,029
People's Socialist Party Nepal	Jitendra Kumar Yadav	13,459
Janamat Party	Prasanna Kumar Jha	7,186
Result	Congress hold	
Source: Election Commission

=== 2017 Nepalese provincial elections ===
Dhanusha 3(A)
Party	Candidate	Votes
Nepali Congress	Ram Saroj Yadav	15,685
Rastriya Janata Party Nepal	Kavindra Nath Thakur	14,047
CPN (Unified Marxist–Leninist)	Dipendra Kumar Yadav	4,945
Others		491
Invalid votes		1,556
Result	Congress gain	
Source: Election Commission

=== 2013 Constituent Assembly election ===
Dhanusha 4
Party	Candidate	Votes
Sadbhavana Party	Sanjay Kumar Sah	12,666
Nepali Congress	Ram Saroj Yadav	11,426
Terai Madhes Loktantrik Party	Brishesh Chandra Lal	2,650
CPN (Unified Marxist–Leninist)	Shri Prasad Sah	2,072
UCPN (Maoist)	Arbind Sah	1,114
Others		5,843
Result	Sadhavana gain	
Source: NepalNews

== See also ==
- Nepali Congress
- Bimalendra Nidhi
- Nepali Congress, Madhesh Province
