= Duhabi, Dhanusha =

Coordinates: 26°41′N 86°4′E

Duhabi दुहबी
- Village
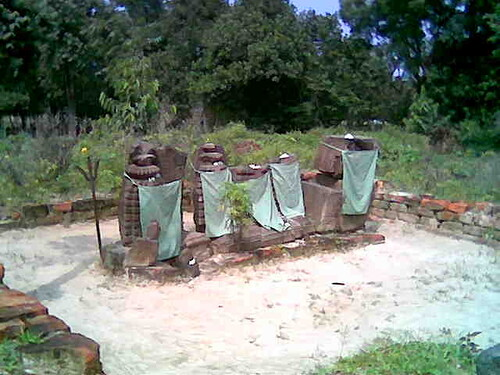
- Interactive map of Duhabi
- Country: Nepal
- Zone: Janakpur Zone
- District: Dhanusa District

Population (1991)
  - Total: 5,762
- Time zone: UTC+5:45 (Nepal Time)

Duhabi is a Village Development Committee in Dhanusa District in the Janakpur Zone of south-eastern Nepal. At the time of the 1991 Nepal census it had a population of 5,762 persons residing in 990 individual households.

Duhabi is an archeological, historical, religious and cultural village situated either sides of indo-Nepal border. The natural environment of the Maithili cultural village includes a river, ponds, mango groove and the historical and archeological sites. It is a natural, cultural, and archeological museum. The word “Duhabi” is derived from the Sanskrit word durba, which means plant of grass family. It is said that Saint Durbasha meditated for 12 years only eating ‘Durba’ in the same village. So the Gadh [place of meditation] got its name Durbasha Gadh latter got its name Duhabi. Historically the archeological remains and icons [stone idols] excavated in the village resemble with archeological remains of Simraungadh and Rajbiraj this proves a historical linkage of Karnat era in Mithila described by the Chinese travelers Xuan Zang and Zheng He.

== Location ==
The archeological, historical, religious, and cultural village, Duhabi is situated in Mithila. It is 15 km east from the historical, religious and cultural town Janakpur and at similar distance from a small business town Jaynagar (India). Nepal railway passes through the village. The archeological remains sites and the temples are at stone throw distance from the railway station.

== Art and Culture ==
Duhabi is steeped in the rich Mithila culture that extends all the way up to the Northern Bihar state of India. According to legend, Duhabi is believed to have been part of the historical Mithila kingdom, with ties to the palace of King Janak, the father of Goddess Sita. Sita is revered under various names, including Janaki and Mythili.

In Duhabi, the Mithila culture thrives, and the village is known for its vibrant Mithila arts and paintings, each carrying historical and religious significance. These artistic creations are primarily the handiwork of local women who skillfully paint colorful and thought-provoking depictions on the walls of their homes. These artworks often feature animals, gods, and goddesses, and are crafted using simple materials such as clays and mud, preserving the traditional essence of Mithila art in the heart of Duhabi.

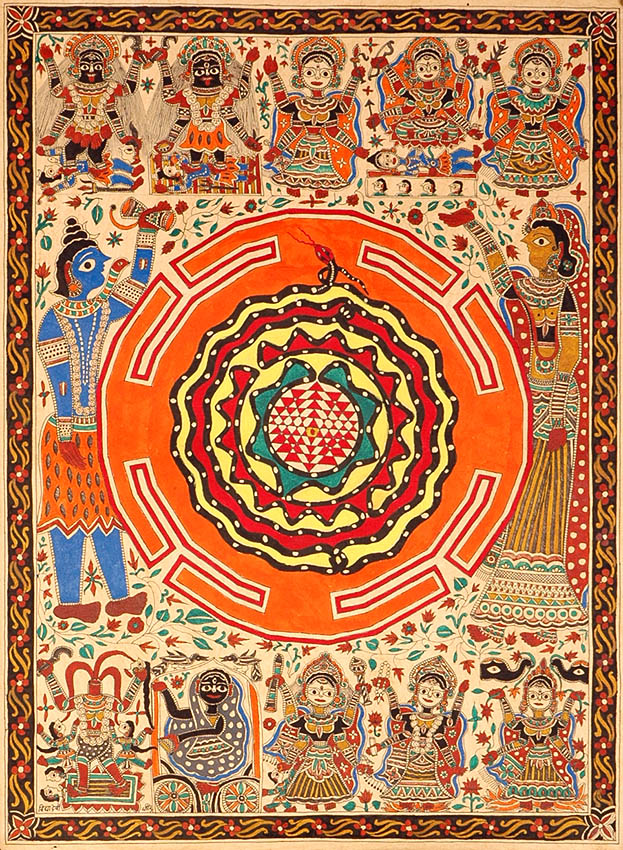
Mithila Art & Painting

== Festivals ==
Major religious celebrations include the Hindu festivals Vivaha Panchami, Dipawali, and Vijayadashami, followed by Chhath Puja, which is celebrated six days after Diwali and Makar Sankranti.

== Language ==
The primary language spoken in Mithila is Maithili. It has its own script and is an important part of the region's identity. Maithili literature has a long history and includes poetry, prose, and religious texts.

== Cuisine ==
Maithil cuisine is a part of Nepalese cuisine. It is a culinary style which originated in Mithila. Some traditional Maithil dishes are:

- Gujiya
- Curd/Yoghurt
- Machher Jhol
- Ghughnee
- Curd-flattened rice
- Vegetable of Taro
- Ghugni
- pickles made of fruits and vegetables which are generally mixed with ingredients like salt, spices, and vegetable oils and are set to mature in a moistureless medium.
- Tarua of Coccinia grandis
- Bada
- Badee
- Yogurt
- Irhar
- Pidukia ( also known as Gujia) which is basically dumplings.
- Foxnut payas
- Anarsa
- Bagiya

== Dances ==
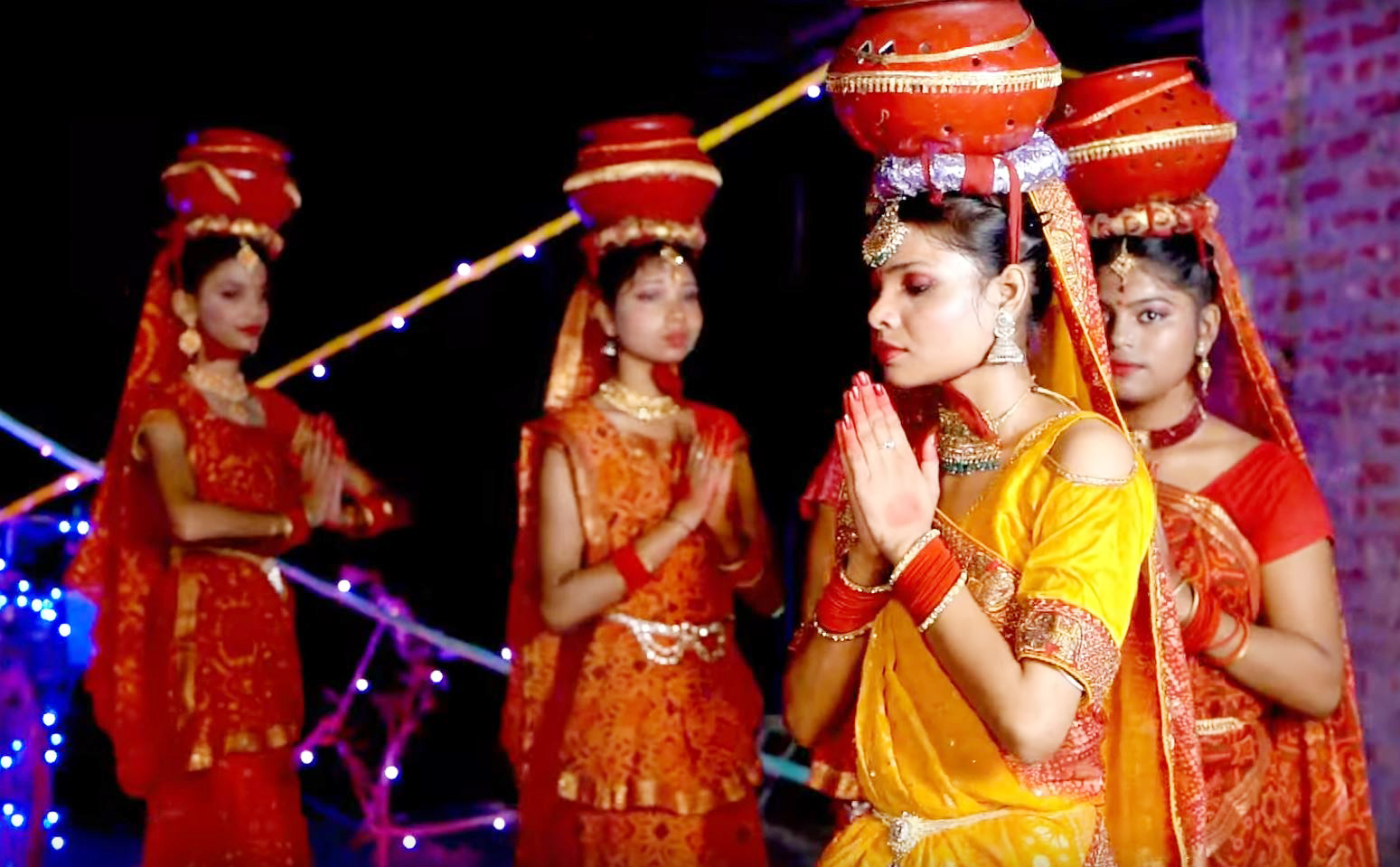
Jhijhiya

=== Jhijhiya ===
Jhijhiya is a cultural dance from the Mithila region.

Jhijhiya is mostly performed at time of Dusshera, in dedication to Durga Bhairavi, the goddess of victory. While performing jhijhiya, women put lanterns made of clay on their head and they balance it while they dance.

=== Domkach ===
Domkach is a folk dance performed in Mithila and Bhojpur regions of Madhesh Province.

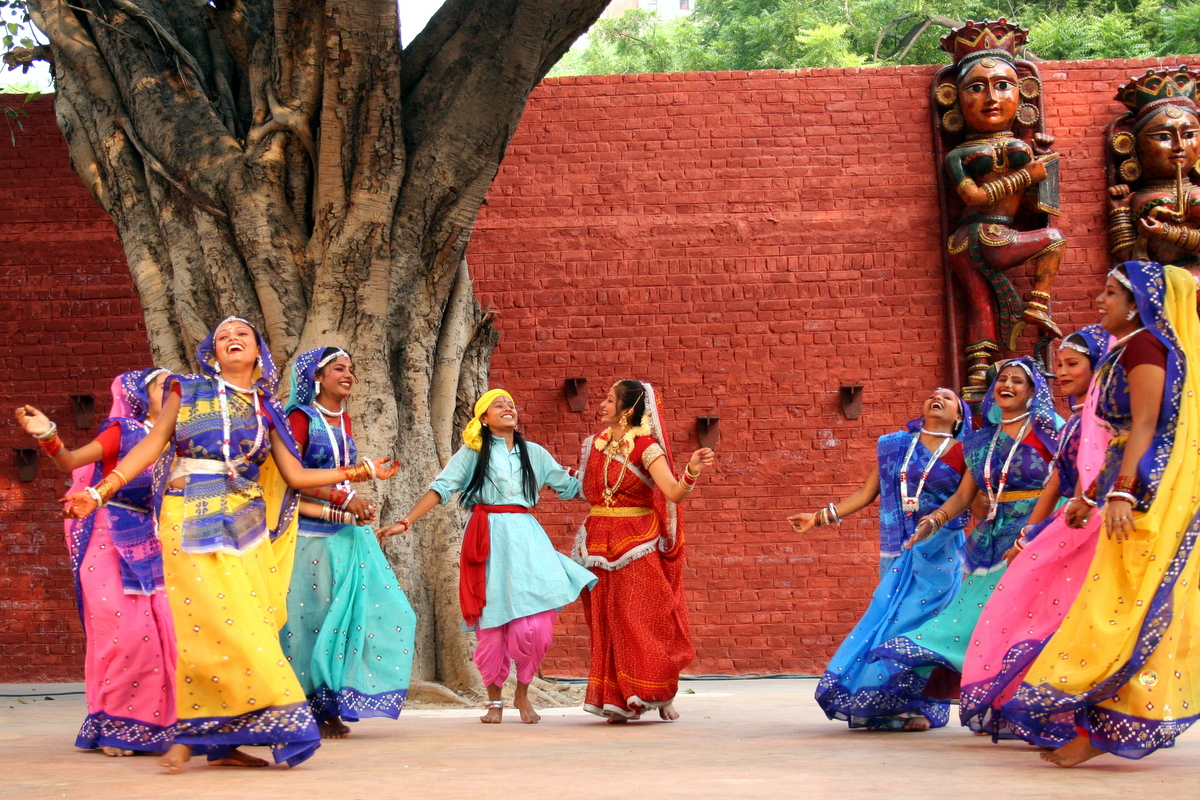
Jat Jatin

=== Jat Jatin ===
Jat Jatin is based on folk songs of Mithila and Tharu community which they perform from Shrawan Purnima to Bhadra Purnima. It is based on the love story of hero jat and heroine Jatin and their lives.

Gauna dance

The Dance is based in Mithila Tradition and popular in Janakpur region of Nepal. This dance is performed in the religious occasions.

== Sites ==
1. Dharohar [locally named archeological sites]
2. Five temples with excavated idols of God and Goddess.
3. 500 year old banyan tree and many year old peepal trees.
4. Cultural events and song, music, art traditional musical instruments.
5. Indo-Nepal border – A small market towns stretched either sides of the border land

== See also ==
- Janakpur - Jaynagar Railway
