= Bimalendra Nidhi =

Nepali politician and Former Deputy PM of Nepal

- विमलेन्द्र निधि

Vice-President of the Nepali Congress
- In office 2017–2021 Serving with Bijay Kumar Gachhadar
- President: Sher Bahadur Deuba
- Preceded by: Ram Chandra Paudel
- Succeeded by: Dhanraj Gurung

Deputy Prime Minister of Nepal
- In office 4 August 2016 – 24 May 2017
- Prime Minister: Pushpa Kamal Dahal
- Preceded by: Bijay Kumar Gachhadar
- Succeeded by: Bijay Kumar Gachhadar

Minister of Home Affairs
- In office 4 August 2016 – 24 May 2017
- Prime Minister: Pushpa Kamal Dahal
- Preceded by: Shakti Bahadur Basnet
- Succeeded by: Janardan Sharma

Minister of Physical Infrastructure and Transport
- In office 25 February 2014 – 12 October 2015
- Prime Minister: Sushil Koirala
- Succeeded by: Bijay Kumar Gachhadar

Minister of Education and Sports

Minister of Industry, Commerce and Supplies

Minister of General Administration
- In office 13 December 1995 – 11 March 1997
- Monarch: Birendra of Nepal
- Prime Minister: Sher Bahadur Deuba

Member of the Constituent Assembly / Legislature Parliament
- In office 2008–2017
- Preceded by: Ananda Prasad Dhungana
- Constituency: Dhanusha-3

General Secretary of Nepali Congress
- In office 2006–2010 Serving with Ram Baran Yadav; Kul Bahadur Gurung
- President: Girija Prasad Koirala
- Preceded by: Girija Prasad Koirala
- Succeeded by: Prakash Man Singh; Krishna Prasad Sitaula

Member of the House of Representatives
- In office 22 December 2022 – 12 September 2025
- Preceded by: Binod Chaudhary
- Constituency: Party List (Nepali Congress)
- In office 1994–2002
- Preceded by: Mahendra Narayan Nidhi
- Succeeded by: Sanjay Sah
- Constituency: Dhanusha-4

Personal details
- Born: 25 September 1956 (age 70) Janakpur, Dhanusa, Nepal
- Party: Nepali Congress
- Spouse: Anamika Upasak Nidhi
- Children: 2 (Abiral Nidhi, Anukul Nidhi)
- Parents: Mahendra Narayan Nidhi (father); Prem Sagari Nidhi (mother)
- Education: Masters in Political Science
- Alma mater: Tribhuvan University

Bimalendra Nidhi (Nepali: बिमलेन्द्र निधि) is a Nepali politician who previously served as a Deputy Prime Minister and Home Minister of Nepal. Also a former Minister of Physical Infrastructure and Transport, Nidhi has won from Dhanusha 3 as MP of House of Representatives and Constituent Assembly. Nidhi has also served as the Vice-president and General secretary of Nepali Congress.

== Personal life ==
Born to Senior Nepali Congress Leader Mahendra Narayan Nidhi and Prem Sagari Nidhi, Bimalendra Nidhi is the second son in the family. Nidhi family are residents of Nagrain Municipality, Dhanusha.

== Political career ==
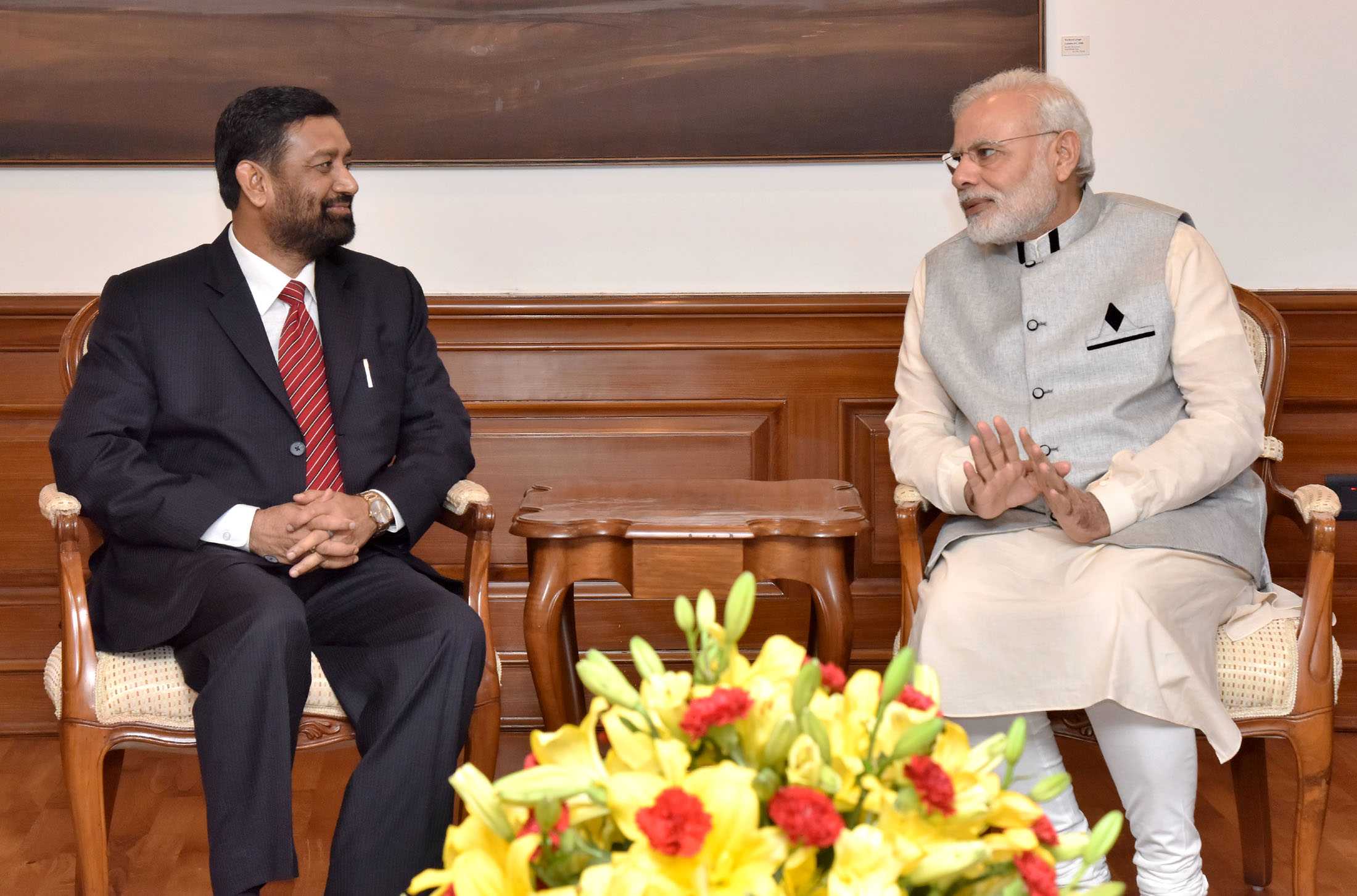
Nidhi meeting Indian Prime Minister Narendra Modi; August 2016.

Bimalendra Nidhi joined student politics at the age of 14, after witnessing the arrest of his father. He is a former president of the Nepal Students Union(NSU), the student wing of Nepali Congress Party. He was only 23 when he led the union at national level.

He was arrested time and again for his political views, most notably in the People's Movement of 1990 and then in Janandolan II. He has spent seven years in prison in total.

He was elected vice-president of Nepali Congress party on 4 May 2021.

He is a former General Secretary of Nepali Congress (Democratic) Party, a break-away faction of the Nepali Congress Party, later assuming the same post after the two parties merged after the movement, until 2009.

He has served twice as the Minister for General Administration, once as the Minister for Education and Sports, as well as, the Minister for Physical Infrastructure and Transport. He served as Deputy Prime-Minister of Nepal in Puspa Kamal Dahal.

Nidhi was an elected twice as member to the Constituent Assembly from Dhanusha 3.[22] He also served as member of House of Representatives from 1994 to 2008 as representative from Dhanusha 4.[23]

Nidhi fielded candidacy for the post of party president in the 14th general convention of Nepali Congress. He was able to garner only 5.3% of the votes opening the way for second round of election as Deuba who obtained 48% votes and was unable to cross 50% mark even after joining hands with leader Krishna Prasad Sitaula. Later, Nidhi agreed to support Deuba.

In the 2022 Nepalese general election, he chose to stand as a candidate for the House of Representatives from Proportional Representation list fearing loss in the upcoming elections from his hometown district. He was elected as a member of House of Representatives from PR list of Nepali Congress on 14 December 2022.

In February 2023, he assisted in the gifting of two Shaligram stones from the Government of Nepal to the Shri Ram Janmabhoomi Teerth Kshetra, the stones would be used for the construction of the child form of the Hindu God Rama to be established in the Ram Mandir, Ayodhya.

== Electoral history ==
Election	House	Constituency	Party	Votes	Opponent	Party	Votes	Result
1994	House of Representatives	Dhanusha 4	Nepali Congress	21,340	Krishna Pratap Malla	RPP	16,563	Elected
1999	House of Representatives	Dhanusha 4	Nepali Congress	19,053	Krishna Pratap Malla	RPP	24,293	Lost
2008	Constituent Assembly	Dhanusha 3	Nepali Congress	15,582	Hari Dev Mandal	CPN (UML)	9,936	Elected
2013	Constituent Assembly	Dhanusha 3	Nepali Congress	15,031	Julie Kumari Mahato	CPN (UML)	13,539	Elected
2017	House of Representatives	Dhanusha 3	Nepali Congress	27,847	Rajendra Mahato	RJP-N	30,750	Lost
2026	House of Representatives	Dhanusha 3	Nepali Congress	16,652	Manish Jha	RSP	43,988	Lost

== See also ==
- Ram Saroj Yadav
- 2022 Janakpur municipal election
- Nepali Congress (Deuba Faction)
