= Dhanusha District =

Dhanusha District धनुषा जिल्ला
- District
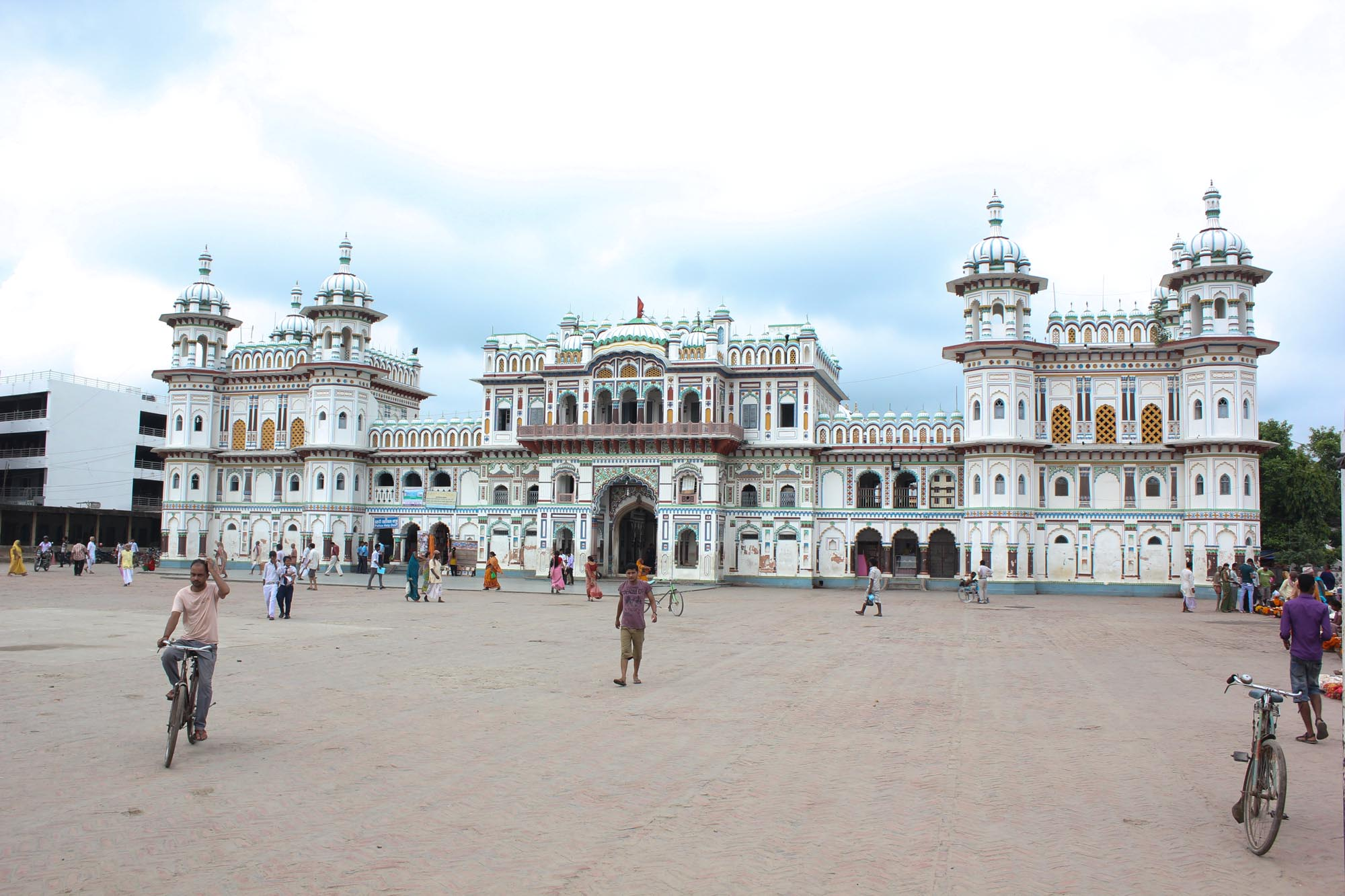
- Janaki Temple at Madhesh Province

- Dhanusha District (dark yellow) in Province No. 2
- Country: Nepal
- Region: Mithila
- Province: Madhesh
- Admin HQ.: Janakpurdham

Government
  - Type: Coordination committee
  - Body: DCC, Dhanusha

Area
  - Total: 1,180.7 km^{2} (455.9 sq mi)

Population (2021)
  - Total: 867,747
  - Rank: auto
  - Density: 734.94/km^{2} (1,903.5/sq mi)
- Time zone: UTC+05:45 (NPT)
- Main Language(s): Maithili (85.8%), Nepali (4.5%)
- Website: ddcdhanusha.gov.np

Dhanusha District (Maithili: धनुषा जिल्ला; [dʱʌnusa]), a part of Madhesh Province, is one of the seventy-seven districts of Nepal. It is situated in the Outer Terai. The district, with Janakpurdham as its district headquarter, covers an area of 1,180.7 km^{2} (455.9 sq mi) and has a population (2021) of 838,084.

During the elections in April 2008, the district was divided into seven constituencies. It is also the home district of the first president of Nepal, Dr. Ram Baran Yadav, who contested and won the elections from constituency 5. As a political center of the region, Dhanusha has prominent leaders like Bimalendra Nidhi (Former Deputy Prime Minister of Nepal), Anand Prasad Dhungana, Mahendra Yadav and Ram Krishna Yadav from the Nepali Congress, Anand Yadav (Gangaram Yadav) from the CPN-UML, Matrika Yadav from the CPN-Maoist and Ram Chandra Jha from CPN (Unified Socialist) who have been ministers at various point of time and are still active.

The most common language spoken in Dhanusha is Maithili.

Dhanusha District has an airport and the only railway system of Nepal which connects Janakpurdham with an Indian town, Jayanagar. It also has the Janakpur Zonal Hospital and several private hospitals.

== Geography and climate ==
Climate Zone	Elevation Range	% of Area
Lower Tropical	below 300 meters (1,000 ft)	92.5%
Upper Tropical	300 to 1,000 meters 1,000 to 3,300 ft.	7.5%

== Economy ==
Agriculture is the major economy of the Dhanusha district. About 90% of citizens of the district are involved in the cultivation of wheat and rice. Rice is the major output. Dhanusha still relies mostly on old-age farming practices, such as the use of bullock-cart for transportation and bull plow for tilling the agriculture fields. However, there is a slow introduction to modern techniques such as a tractor for goods transportation (for agriculture purposes), thrasher, and so on. Remittances make up a large portion of its GDP.

== Demographics ==
Historical population
Census year	Pop.	±% p.a.
1981	432,569	—
1991	543,672	+2.31%
2001	671,364	+2.13%
2011	754,777	+1.18%
2021	867,747	+1.40%
Source: Citypopulation

At the time of the 2021 Nepal census, Dhanusa District had a population of 867,747. 11.03% of the population is under 5 years of age. It has a literacy rate of 65.22% and a sex ratio of 1019 females per 1000 males. 710060 (81.83%) lived in municipalities.

Ethnic groups/castes in Dhanusa district (2021)
1. Yadav (17.6%)
2. Muslim (9.20%)
3. Kewat (6.18%)
4. Teli (5.48%)
5. Kushwaha (4.96%)
6. Dhanuk (4.89%)
7. Sundi (4.34%)
8. Chamar (3.96%)
9. Tatma (3.68%)
10. Bind (3.09%)
11. Paswan (2.63%)
12. Musahar (2.57%)
13. Khatwe (2.52%)
14. Terai Brahmin (2.40%)
15. Other Madheshi non-Dalit (17.7%)
16. Hill Janjati (3.50%)
17. Khas non-Dalit (1.89%)
18. Other Madheshi Dalit (1.40%)
19. Others (1.98%)

Ethnicity/caste: Madheshis are the largest group. Yadavs are over 17% of the population. Muslims are 9% of the population, and Hill Janjati are 3% of the population.

Religion in Dhanusa District (2021)
Religion	Percent
Hinduism	88.98%
Islam	9.69%
Buddhism	1.13%
Other or not stated	0.20%

Religion: 89.0% were Hindu, 9.6% Muslim, 1.1% Buddhism.

Languages of Dhanusa district (2021)
1. Maithili (80.4%)
2. Magahi (10.9%)
3. Nepali (3.83%)
4. Urdu (2.50%)
5. Others (2.43%)

Maithili is the largest language. Magahi is the second-largest language. Urdu and Nepali are spoken by a small minority.

== Administration ==
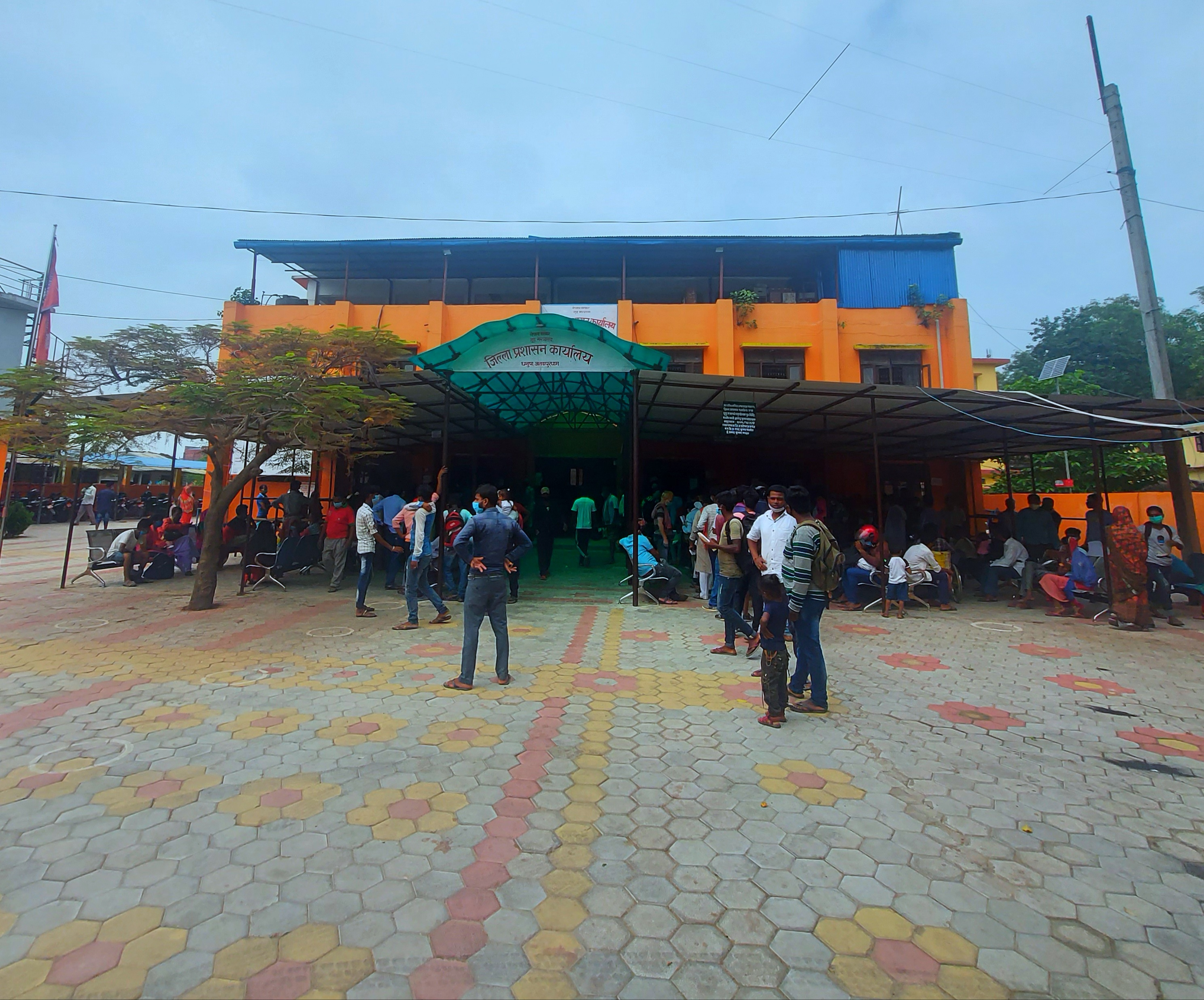
District Administration Office, Dhanusha

The district consists of one sub-metropolitan city, eleven urban municipalities and six rural municipalities. These are as follows:

- Janakpur Sub Metropolitan City
- Chhireshwarnath Municipality
- Ganeshman Charanath
- Dhanusadham Municipality
- Nagarain Municipality
- Bideha Municipality
- Mithila Municipality
- Shahidnagar Municipality
- Sabaila Municipality
- Kamala Municipality
- Mithila Bihari Municipality
- Hansapur Municipality
- Janaknandani Rural Municipality
- Bateshwar Rural Municipality
- Mukhiyapatti Musharniya Rural Municipality
- Lakshminya Rural Municipality
- Aurahi Rural Municipality
- Dhanauji Rural Municipality

=== Former municipalities and VDCs ===
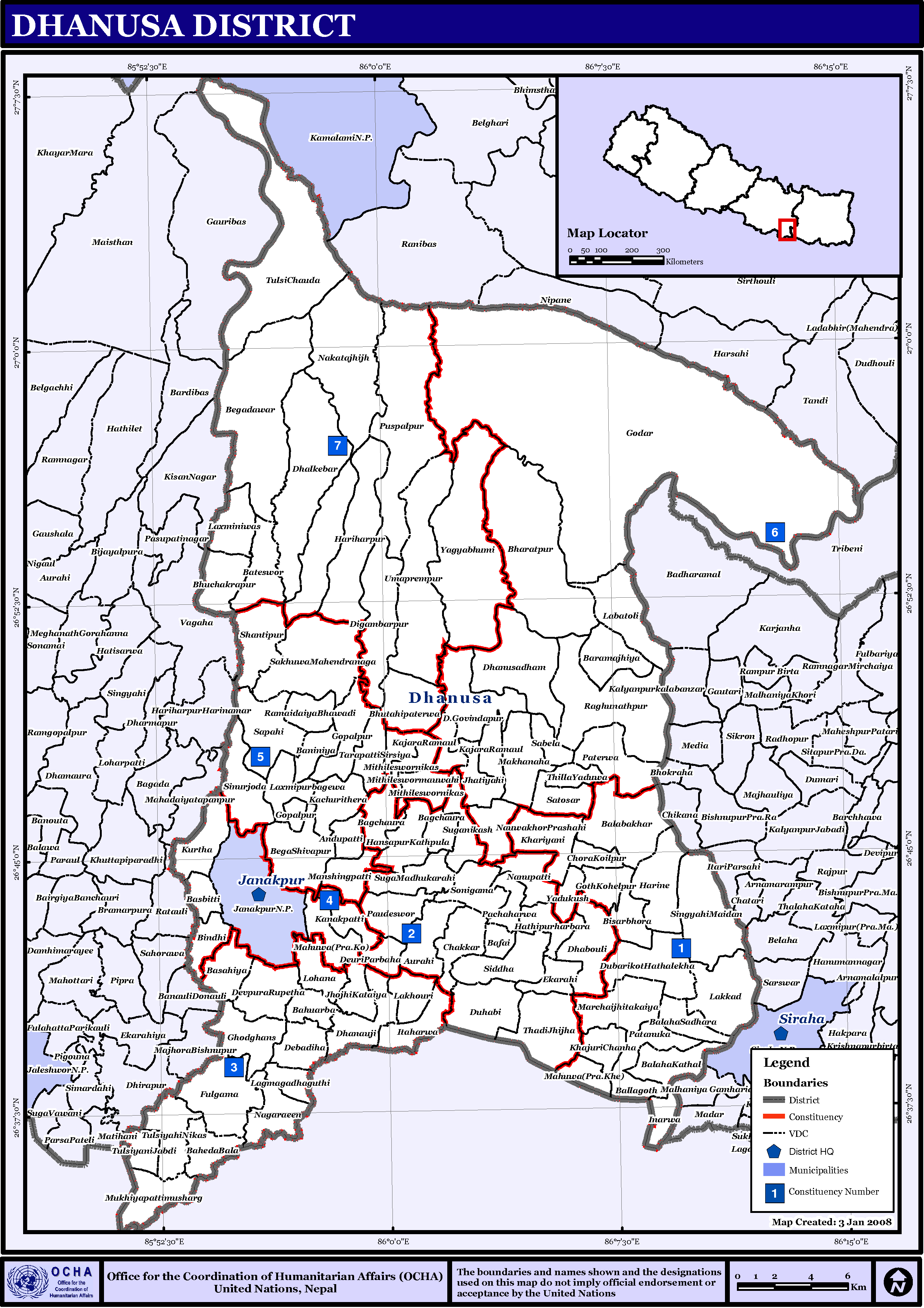
Map of the VDCs in Dhanusa District

- Andupatti
- Aurahi
- Baphai
- Bagchaura
- Baheda Bala
- Bahuarba
- Balabakhar
- Balaha Kathal
- Balaha Saghara
- Ballagoth
- Baniniya
- Baramajhiya
- Basahiya
- Basbitti
- Bateshwar
- Bega Shivapur
- Begadawar
- Bharatpur
- Bhuchakrapur
- Bhutahi Paterwa
- Bindhi
- Bisarbhora
- Chakkar
- Chireswarnath
- Chora Koilpur
- Debadiha
- Deuri Parbaha
- Devpura Rupetha
- Dhabauli
- Dhalkebar
- Dhanauji
- Dhanusadham Municipality
- Dubarikot Hathalekha
- Duhabi
- Ekarahi
- Ganeshman Charanath Municipality
- Ghodghans
- Giddha
- Godar
- Gopalpur
- Goth Kohelpur
- Hansapur Kathpula
- Harine
- Hathipur Harbara
- Inarwa
- Itaharwa
- Janakpur Sub Metropolis
- Jhatiyahi
- Jhojhi Kataiya
- Kachuri Thera
- Kajara Ramaul
- Kanakpatti
- Khajuri Chanha
- Khariyani
- Kurtha
- Labatoli
- Lagmamdha Guthi
- Lakhauri
- Lakkad
- Lakshminibas
- Lakshmipur Bagewa
- Lohana Bahbangama
- Machijhitakaiya
- Mahuwa (Pra. Ko)
- Mahuwa (Pra. Khe)
- Makhanaha
- Manshingpatti
- Mithileshwar Nikash
- Mithileshwar Mauwahi
- Mithila Municipality
- Mukhiyapatti Mushargiya
- Nagarain
- Nakatajhijh
- Nauwakhor Prashahi
- Nunpatti
- Pachaharwa
- Papikleshwar
- Patanuka
- Paterwa
- Paudeshwar
- Phulgama
- Puspalpur
- Raghunathpur
- Rampur Birta
- Sabaila Municipality
- Sapahi
- Satosar
- Shantipur
- Siddha
- Singyahi Maidan
- Sinurjoda
- Sonigama
- Suga Madhukarahi
- Suganikash
- Tarapatti Sirsiya
- Thadi Jhijha
- Thilla Yaduwa
- Tulsi Chauda
- Tulsiyahi Nikas
- Tulsiyani Jabdi
- Yadukush
- Yagyabhumi

=== Villages ===
- Kharihani

== Notable people ==
- Mahendra Narayan Nidhi, democracy fighter and recipient of second highest honour, the Rastra Gaurav Man Padavi
- Ram Baran Yadav, first president of the Federal Democratic Republic of Nepal
- Bimalendra Nidhi, Nepali Congress Vice president and former Deputy prime minister and Home Minister of Nepal
- Ram Chandra Jha, former Minister and secretariat member of CPN (Unified Socialist)
- Mahendra Yadav, Nepali Congress Deputy General Secretary and former Minister for Water Supply
- Chandra Mohan Yadav, member of Nepalese Constituent Assembly
- Raghubir Mahaseth, CPN (UML) secretary and former Minister for Physical Development
- Minakshi Jha and Smriti Narayan Chaudhary, Nepali Congress leaders and member of House of Representatives
- Mithila Chaudhary, member of the Nepalese Constituent Assembly and Minister for Population and Environment

=== Ministers of Federal government ===
- Ram Krishna Yadav, Nepali Congress leader and former Minister for Agriculture
- Umashankar Argariya, MJFN (Loktantrik) leader and Minister for Culture, Tourism and Civil Aviation
- Ananda Prasad Dhungana, Nepali Congress leader and former Minister for Forest and Soil Conservation

=== Minister of provincial government ===
- Ram Saroj Yadav, current Minister for Physical Infrastructure Development
- Satrudhan Mahato, current Minister for Industry, Tourism and Forest
