= Aamtep =

Place in Nepal

Aamtep आम्तेप
- Neighborhood
- Location in Nepal Aamtep (Nepal)
- Coordinates: 27.16°N 87.08°E
- Country: Nepal
- Provinces: Province No. 1
- District: Bhojpur District
- Municipalities: Bhojpur Municipality
- Established: 2017

Government
  - Type: Ward council
  - Body: Bhojpur Municipality
  - Chairperson: Ashok Rai (NCP)

Area
  - Total: 16.44 km^{2} (6.35 sq mi)

Population (2011)
  - Total: 2,635
  - Density: 160.3/km^{2} (415.1/sq mi)
- Time zone: UTC+5:45 (Nepal Time)

Aamtep (Nepali: आम्तेप) is a former VDC and now a neighborhood of Bhojpur Municipality in Bhojpur District in the Province No. 1 of eastern Nepal. At the time of the 1991 Nepal census it had a population of 3,136 persons living in 537 individual households.

In March 2017, the Government of Nepal restructured all the local level bodies of Nepal into 753 new local level structures. The previous Aamtep, Helauchha, Siddheshwar and Gupteshwar VDCs merged again in Bhojpur Municipality and rearranged the 11 wards into 12 wards.

Now total population of Aamtep (according to the 2011 Nepal census) is 2,635 individuals and area of the Aamtep is 16.44 square kilometres (6.35 sq mi). It is Ward No. 11 of Bhojpur Municipality.

Bhojpur Municipality
Neighborhood	Ward no.	Area	Population (2011)	Ward chairperson
Aamtep	11	16.44 km^{2}	2,635	Ashok Rai
