= Bhojpur Municipality =

Bhojpur भोजपुर
- Municipality (नगरपालिका)
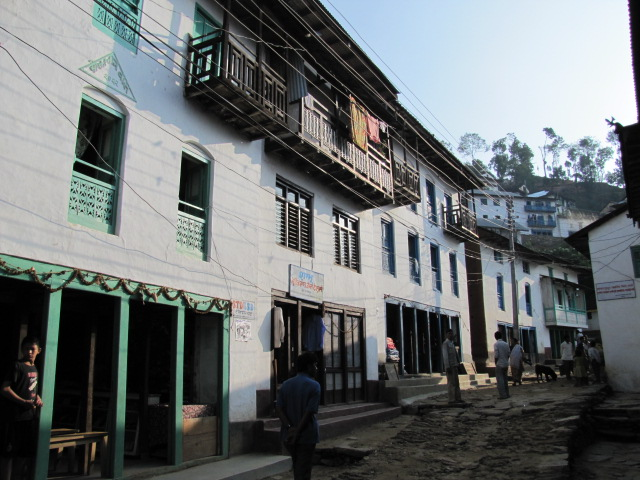
- Bhojpur Municipality

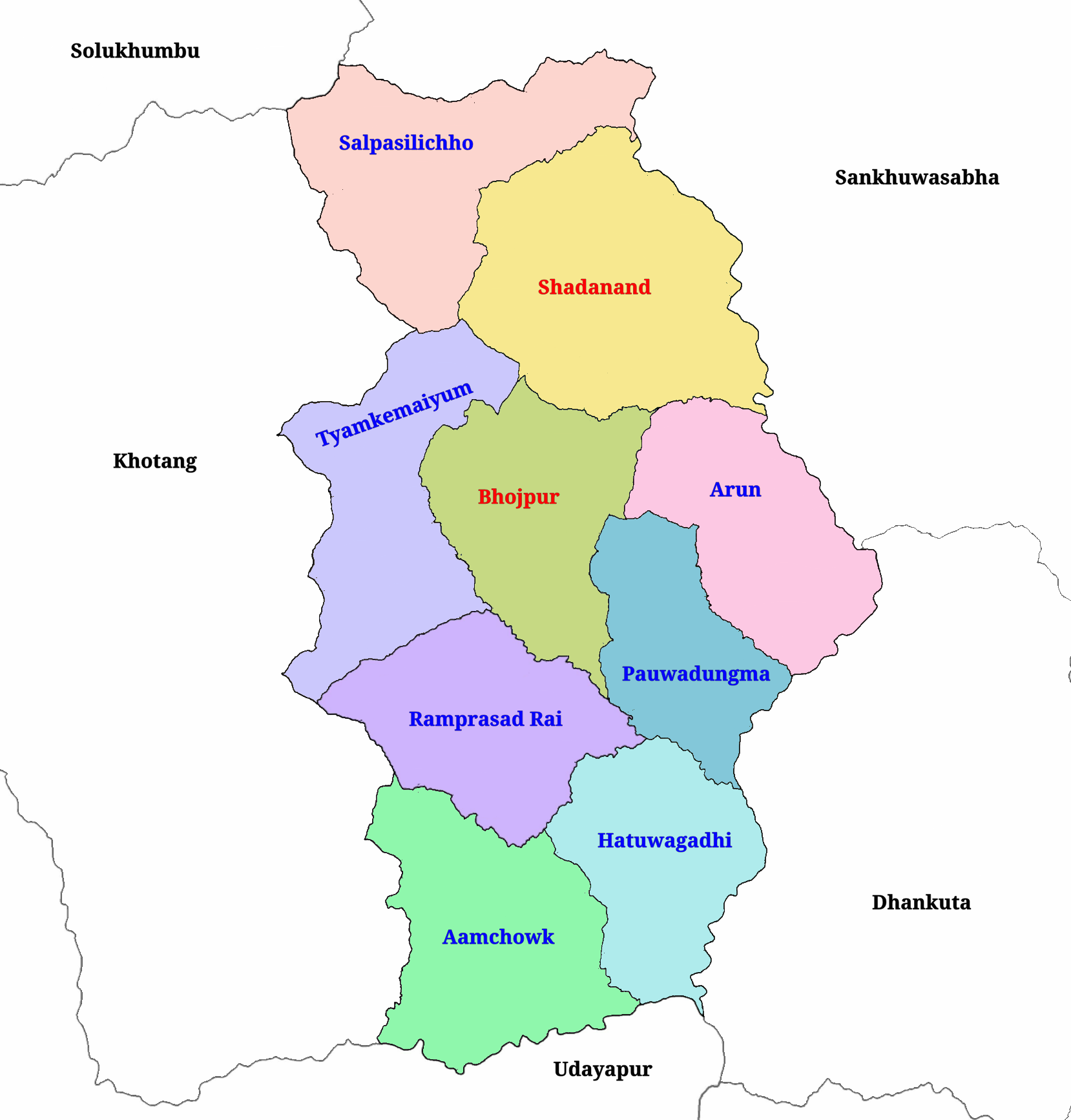
- Map of Bhojpur District showing all local level units

- Location in Koshi Province Bhojpur (Nepal)
- Coordinates: 27°10′N 87°3′E
- Country: Nepal
- Province: Koshi Province
- District: Bhojpur District
- Wards: 12
- Established: 17 July 2011
- Headquarter: Bhojpur

Government
  - Type: Mayor-council
  - Mayor: Kailash Kumar Ale (NC)
  - Deputy Mayor: Nirmala Sherpa (CPN (US))

Area
  - Total: 159.51 km^{2} (61.59 sq mi)

Population (2011)
  - Total: 27,204
  - Density: 170.55/km^{2} (441.72/sq mi)
- Time zone: NST
- Postal code: 57000
- Area code: 029
- GDP (Nominal): 2017
- Total: RsBillion $Million(Billion, PPP)
- per capita: Rs $(PPP)
- GDP growth: Moderate (2016)
- Licence plate prefixes: initiating with Province No 1, Koshi Zone
- City flower: Rhododendron
- City trees: Orange, Rudraksha and Amba
- Climate: Cwb
- Website: www.bhojpurmun.gov.np/en (in English)

Bhojpur (Nepali: भोजपुर) is one of the two urban municipalities of Bhojpur District of Koshi Province of Nepal.

Bhojpur is the traditional home of the Kirat Rai people and has a long history since the settlement of the Kirat Rai people. Bhojpur bazaar is famous for its metalwork, particularly khukuri knives and Karuwa (metal vessels). It is home to many businesses as well as skilled craftsmen. Other major towns in the district include Dingla to the north, Ghoretar to the south, and Taksar near the airstrip, from where flights connect to Biratnagar and Kathmandu.

The design and construction of the 240 km Koshi Highway in east Nepal between Dharan on the Terai Plain and Num in the Middle Himalaya commenced in the early 1970s and was completed in 2012 when the first vehicles were able to drive to Num. Construction of this highway links Bhjopur to other major cities and towns like Hile, Dhankuta and Dharan.

Historically it is a part of Majh Kirat (middle Kirat/ Khambuwan), and used to be called "east number 4". Middle Kirat consists mainly of Bhojpur and Khotang districts, the traditional home of kirat Rai people, an indigenous ethnic group of Nepal. In addition to Rais, other ethnic groups include castes like Chhetris, Bahuns, and Dalits.

== Background ==
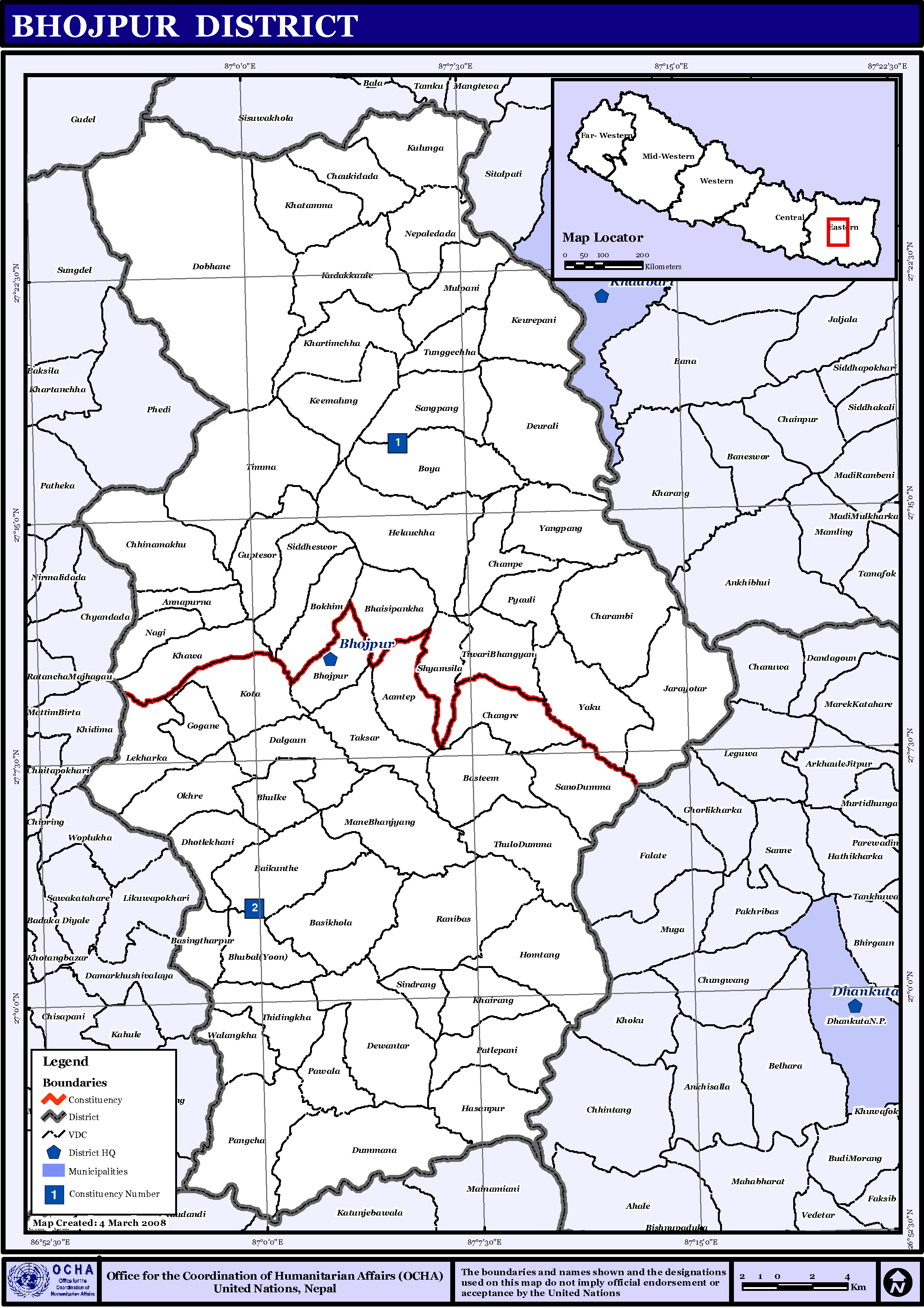
All VDCs within Bhojpur district

Bhojpur was a VDC in Bhojpur District before 2014. According to the 2011 Nepal census it had total population of 7,446 with 2,070 households.

On 18 May 2014 the Government of Nepal declared 72 new municipalities within the whole country. At the same time Bhojpur Municipality was declared, incorporating Bhojpur, Bhaisipankha, Bokhim and Taksar VDCs diving in 11 ward units.

In March 2017, the Government of Nepal restructured all the local level bodies of Nepal into 753 new local level structures. The previous Aamtep, Helauchha, Siddheshwar and Gupteshwar VDCs merged again in Bhojpur Municipality and rearranged the 11 wards into 12 wards.

Now total area of the municipality is 159.51 square kilometres (61.59 sq mi) and total population according to the 2011 Nepal census is 27,204. The admin headquarter of the municipality is located at Bhojpur Bazar (ward no. 7).

Ward distribution of Bhojpur Municipality
Former VDC	Ward	Area (KM²)	Population	Map
Helauchha	1	19.08	1500	
Helauchha	2	20.77	2211	
Gupteshwar	3	17.31	1914	
Siddheshwar	4	17.47	2842	
Bokhim	5	16	2882	
Bhojpur	6	4.03	1710	
Bhojpur	7*	2.29	2805	
Bhojpur	8	4.75	1160	
Bhojpur	9	2.38	1771	
Bhaisipankha	10	18.28	2434	
Aamtep	11	16.44	2635	
Taksar	12	20.72	33.50	

== Constituency ==
Bhojpur Municipality is divide into two Provincial constituencies as below:

Constituency	MLA	Party	Ward No.	Neighborhood
Bhojpur 1(A)	Rajendra Kumar Rai	Nepal Communist Party	1 & 2	Helauchha
Bhojpur 1(A)	Rajendra Kumar Rai	Nepal Communist Party	3	Gupteshwar
Bhojpur 1(A)	Rajendra Kumar Rai	Nepal Communist Party	4	Siddheshwar
Bhojpur 1(A)	Rajendra Kumar Rai	Nepal Communist Party	5	Bokhim
Bhojpur 1(A)	Rajendra Kumar Rai	Nepal Communist Party	10	Bhaisipankha
Bhojpur 1(B)	Sher Dhan Rai	Nepal Communist Party	6, 7, 8, 9	Bhojpur
Bhojpur 1(B)	Sher Dhan Rai	Nepal Communist Party	11	Aamtep
Bhojpur 1(B)	Sher Dhan Rai	Nepal Communist Party	12	Taksar

== People ==
- Rai people
- Newar people

== Religion ==
- Hindu
- Buddhism
- Kirant Mundhum
- Christian

== College & Universities ==
- Bhojpur Multiple Campus
- Nucleus Academy
- Bidhyodaya Higher Secondary School
- PanchaKanya Secondary School
- Yasodhara Higher Secondary School
- Sidheswor Higher Secondary School
- Teachers Training Center
- Shree Janodaya Secondary School
- Shree Tyamke Primary School
- Shree Jaunagi Adharbhut School

== Tourism Spots ==
- Suntale Danda
- Bhojpur Airport
- Bokhim
- Bhaisipankha
- Dipsha Village
- Tyamke Dada
- Maiyung Dada
- Shilichung
- Hatuwagadhi
- Siktel And Pikhuwa KHola
- Taksar Temple
- Siddhakali Temple
- Bhojpur Bazar

== Transportation ==
=== Airways ===
Bhojpur Airport

=== Public Bus ===
Bhojpur Bus Park

== Notable people ==
- Ram Prasad Rai
- Dayahang Rai
- Bidhya Devi Bhandari
- Babu Bhogati
- Sher Dhan Rai
- Hom Nath Upadhyaya
- sudan kirati
