= Nannupatti =

Nannupatti नन्नुपट्टी
- Ward
- Ward in Nepal
- Location in Nepal
- Coordinates: 26.56°N 86.36°E
- Country: Nepal
- Province: Madhesh
- District: Dhanusa
- Municipality: Shahidnagar
- Ward Number: 4

Government
  - President: Ramesh Mukhia

Population (2021)
  - Total: 5,356: 2,583(M); 2,773(F)

Languages
  - Local: Maithili
- Time zone: UTC+5:45 (Nepal Time)

Nannupatti is a Ward (formerly VDC) in Shahidnagar Municipality in Dhanusa District in the Madhesh Province of Nepal. At the time of the 2021 Nepal census it had a population of 5,356 persons.
