= Gothakoyalpur =

Gothakoyalpur गोठकोयलपुर
- Ward
- Ward in Nepal
- Location in Nepal
- Coordinates: 26.74°N 86.12°E
- Country: Nepal
- Province: Madhesh
- District: Dhanusa
- Municipality: Shahidnagar
- Ward Number: 9

Government
  - President: Shiv Kumar Kherwar Yadav
  - Secretary: Deep Kumar Mahato

Population (2021)
  - Total: 4,363: 2,087(M); 2,276(F)

Languages
  - Local: Maithili
- Time zone: UTC+5:45 (Nepal Time)

Gothakoyalpur is a Ward (formerly VDC) in Shahidnagar Municipality in Dhanusa District in the Madhesh Province of Nepal. At the time of the 2021 Nepal census it had a population of 4,363 persons.

== Transport ==
=== Roadways ===
Frequent bus services operate between Shahidnagar Municipality Wards Village and Nepalese cities. Nowadays, electric rickshaws are is Frequent Use.

== Culture ==
=== Religious sites ===
There are several Hindu Temples and Masjid located in this Municipality.

=== Festivals ===
Major religious celebrations include the Hindu festivals Dipawali, and Vijayadashami, followed by Chhath Puja, which is celebrated six days after Diwali and Makar Sankranti.
