= Yadukuha =

Yadukuha यदुकुहा
- Ward
- Ward in Nepal
- Location in Nepal
- Coordinates: 26.73°N 86.10°E
- Province: Madhesh
- District: Dhanusa
- Municipality: Shahidnagar
- Ward Number: 3

Government
  - President: Manoj Kumar Das

Population (2021)
  - Total: 7,633: 3,749(M); 3,884(F)

Languages
  - Local: Maithili
- Time zone: UTC+5:45 (Nepal Time)

Yadukuha is a Ward (formerly VDC) in Shahidnagar Municipality in Dhanusa District in the Madhesh Province of Nepal. At the time of the 2021 Nepal census it had a population of 7,633 persons.

The major source of income for this village is agriculture (80%) & rest on local business. In past years, education was not given priorities, but villagers these days are sending their children to get education for their brighter future.

Mass collection of people on Sunday & Wednesday at local market for selling & buying vegetable products, fish, hand made bamboo products, and spices from around 15-20 nearby villages. Even small markets of vegetables are organized on Friday, Tuesday & Monday.

There is a myth that a god namely champawati resides in this village. In one summer night of 1970s many people saw a powerful light coming from a place and when people went to see that place they saw 3 goddess coming from underground earth. Everybody was scared and ran away. Still people claim that it was real. Now-a-days people say that when they go there in night they see the goddess there.
