= Raj Sagar =

Raj Sagar राज सागर
- Also known as: Raj kumar Sundas
- Born: 22 September 1984 (age 41); Bhojpur, Nepal
- Genres: Ghazal, classical
- Occupation(s): Singer, music composer
- Instrument(s): Harmonium, keyboard
- Years active: 2006 AD – present

Raj Sagar (Nepali: राज सागर; born 22 September 1984) is a Nepalese singer and music composer.

== Biography ==
Raj Sagar was born on 22 September 1984 in Bhojpur, Nepal. He is a singer of the ghazal and classical genres. He started his singing career from 2016 with debut song "Ajhai Baki". Ajhai Baki, Riya, Prahar and Gitanjali are some popular song in his singing career. He has been awarded from Image Award and Bindabasini Music Award.

== Award ==
SN	Award Title	Award Category	Notable Work	Result	ref
1	19th annual Tuborg Image Award	Best Vocal Performance Male	Pharkidai Raharharuma -pop songs	Nominated	
2	11th Bindabasini Music Award	Best Duat Song of the Year	Maya He Maya	Nominated	
3	16th Image Award - 2016	Public Choice Award		Won	
4	7th Music Khabar Music Award - 2018	Best Dual Singing	Dhaka Topi	Won	

== Songs ==
SN	Songs	release date	ref
1	Asarai Lagyo Darkiyo Pani	2022AD	
2	Gaya Timra Yadharu	2020AD	
3	Rato sadi		
4	E Manchhe	2021AD	
5	Dhalyo Dhalyo - Movie Song		
6	Jaleko Jalei Chha - Movie Kuineto		
7	Gajal Nalagau	2024AD	
