= Bokhim =

Bokhim बोखिम
- Former Village Development Committee (पूर्व गाउँ विकास समिति)
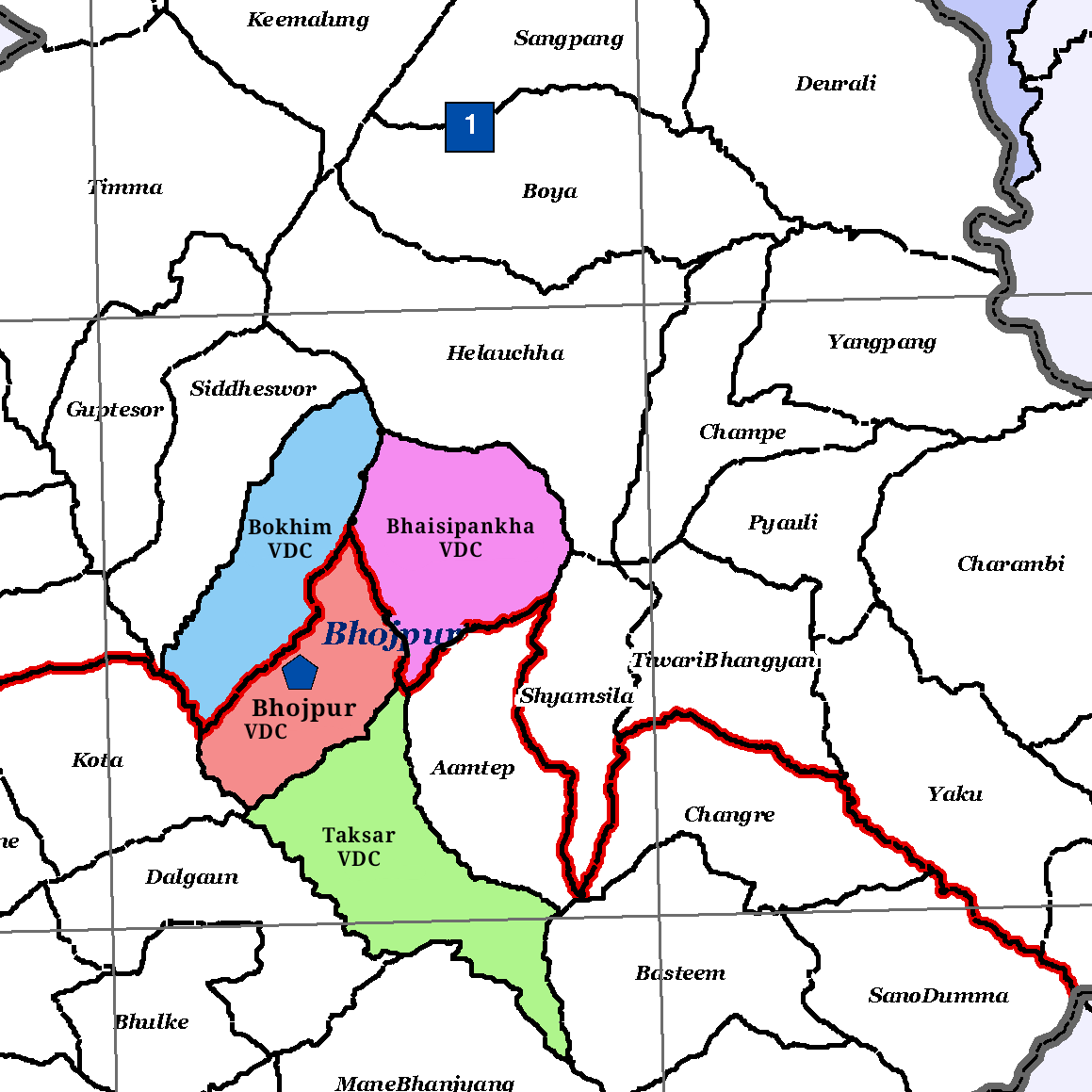
- Map of Bhojpur Municipality before 2017 showing Bokhim VDC as neighborhood

- Location in Nepal Bokhim (Nepal)
- Coordinates: 27.20°N 87.04°E
- Country: Nepal
- Provinces: Koshi Province
- District: Bhojpur District
- Municipalities: Bhojpur Municipality
- Established: 2017

Government
  - Type: Ward council
  - Body: Bhojpur Municipality
  - Chairperson: Phabindra Pradhan (NC)

Area
  - Total: 16 km^{2} (6.2 sq mi)

Population (2021)
  - Total: 3,566
  - Density: 220/km^{2} (580/sq mi)
- Time zone: UTC+5:45 (Nepal Time)

Bokhim is a former Village Development Committee and now a neighborhood of Bhojpur Municipality in Bhojpur District in the Koshi Province of eastern Nepal. At the 1991 census it had a population of 3,438 persons living in 618 individual households.

On 18 May 2014 the Government of Nepal declared 72 new municipalities within the whole country. At the same time Bhojpur Municipality was declared, incorporating Bhojpur, Bhaisipankha, Bokhim and Taksar VDCs diving in 11 ward units.

Now the total population of Bokhim (according to the 2011 Nepal census) is 2,882 individuals and area of the Bokhim is 16 square kilometres (6.2 sq mi). It is Ward No. 5 of Bhojpur Municipality.

Bhojpur Municipality
Neighborhood	Ward no.	Area	Population (2011)	Ward chairperson
Bokhim	5	16 km^{2}	3,566	Phabindra Pradhan
