= Taksar, Bhojpur =

Taksar टक्सार
- Former Village Development Committee (पूर्व गाउँ विकास समिति)
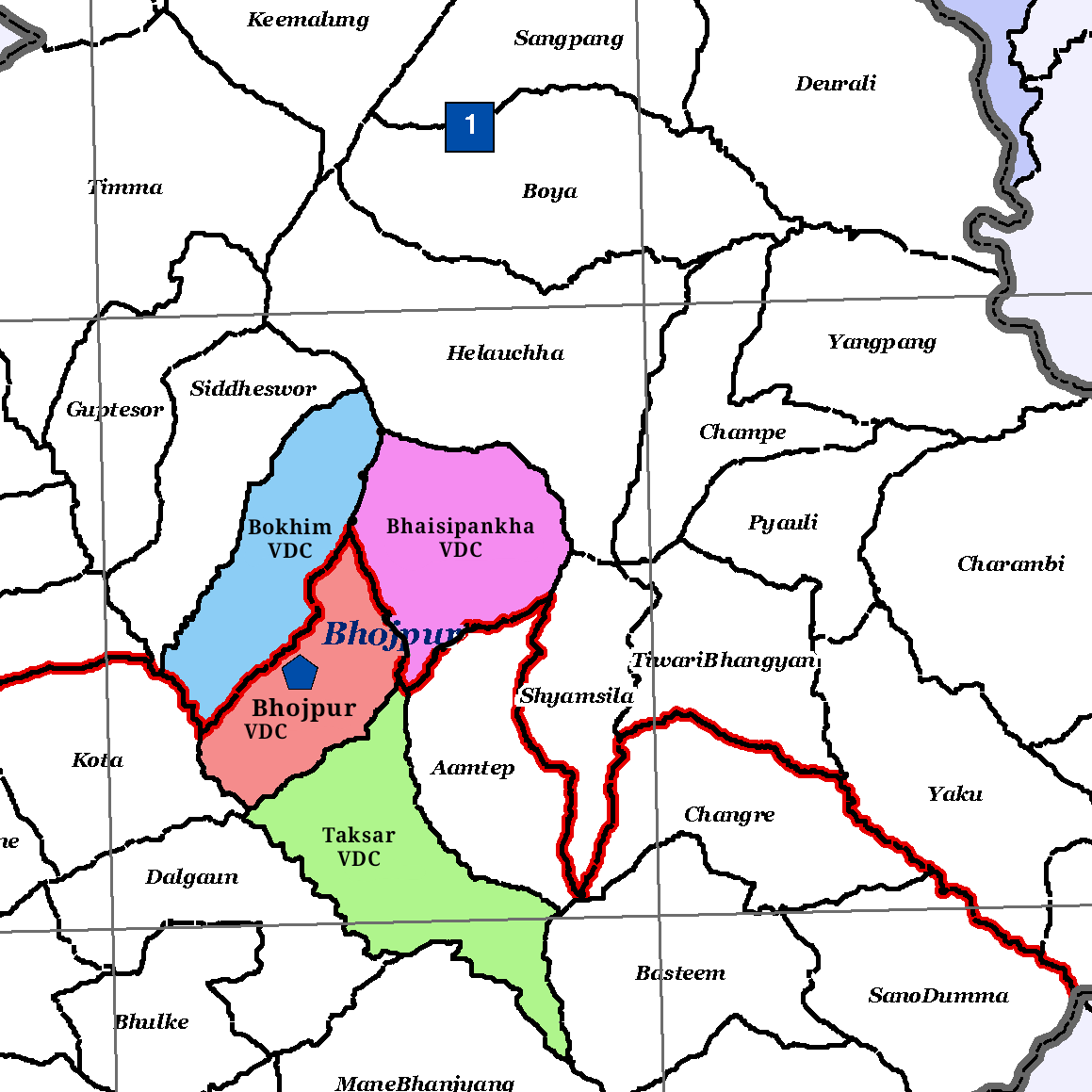
- Map of Bhojpur Municipality before 2017 showing Taksar VDC as neighborhood

- Location in Nepal Taksar (Nepal)
- Coordinates: 27°09′26″N 87°03′04″E
- Country: Nepal
- Provinces: Koshi Province
- District: Bhojpur District
- Municipalities: Bhojpur Municipality
- Established: 2017

Government
  - Type: Ward council
  - Body: Bhojpur Municipality
  - Chairperson: Kumar Prasad Shrestha

Area
  - Total: 2,072 km^{2} (800 sq mi)

Population (2011)
  - Total: 3,350
  - Density: 1.62/km^{2} (4.19/sq mi)
- Time zone: UTC+5:45 (Nepal Time)

Taksar is a former Village Development Committee and now a neighborhood of Bhojpur Municipality in Bhojpur District in Koshi Province of eastern Nepal. At the 1991 census, Taksar had a population of 4,524 persons living in 829 individual households.

On 18 May 2014, the Government of Nepal announced the establishment of 72 new municipalities across the country. At this time, Bhojpur Municipality was established, incorporating Bhojpur, Bhaisipankha, Bokhim and Taksar VDCs, subdivided into eleven wards.

According to the 2011 Nepal census, 3,350 individuals live in Taksar and it covers an area of 20.72 square kilometres (8.00 sq mi). It is now Ward No. 12 of Bhojpur Municipality.

Bhojpur Municipality
Neighborhood	Ward no.	Area	Population (2011)	Ward chairperson
Taksar	12	20.72 km^{2}	3,350	Kumar Prasad Shrestha
