= Nathpatti Bisarbhora =

Nathpatti Bisarbhora नाथपट्टी विसरभाेरा
- Ward
- Ward in Nepal
- Location in Nepal
- Coordinates: 26.72°N 86.13°E
- Country: Nepal
- Province: Madhesh
- District: Dhanusa
- Municipality: Shahidnagar
- Ward Number: 8

Government
  - President: Tanuklal Kusiyat Yadav
  - Secretary: Vishnudev Bhinwar Yadav

Population (2021)
  - Total: 5,374: 2,605(M); 2,769(F)

Languages
  - Local: Maithili
- Time zone: UTC+5:45 (Nepal Time)

Nathpatti Bisarbhora is a Ward (formerly VDC) in Shahidnagar Municipality in Dhanusa District in the Madhesh Province of Nepal. At the time of the 2021 Nepal census it had a population of 5,374 persons.
