= Uday Barbariya Yadav =

Nepalese politician

Uday Kumar Barbariya Yadav
- उदय कुमार बरबरिया यादव

Mayor of Shahidnagar Municipality
- In office 22 May 2017 – 22 May 2022
- Preceded by: Position established
- Succeeded by: Dinesh Prasad Yadav

Personal details
- Born: 25 May 1993 (age 33) Batrahi, Shahidnagar Municipality, Dhanusha District, Nepal
- Party: Communist Party of Nepal (Maoist Centre)
- Other political affiliations: Nepal Communist Party (2018–2021)
- Spouse: Preeti Yadav
- Parent(s): Jog Kumar Barbariya Yadav (father); Shibodevi Yadav (mother)
- Education: Bachelor's degree in civil engineering
- Occupation: Politician, civil engineer

Uday Kumar Barbariya Yadav (Nepali: उदय कुमार बरबरिया यादव; born 25 May 1993) is a Nepalese politician and civil engineer who served as the first elected mayor of Shahidnagar Municipality in Dhanusha District, Madhesh Province, from 2017 to 2022. Elected at the age of 24 in the 2017 Nepalese local elections, he became one of the youngest mayors in Nepal.

== Early life and education ==
Yadav was born on 25 May 1993 in Batrahi village (now part of Shahidnagar Municipality). He is the eldest son of local Maoist leader Jog Kumar Barbariya Yadav and Shibodevi Yadav. He holds a bachelor's degree in civil engineering.

== Political career ==
Yadav began his political journey through the youth wing of the CPN (Maoist Centre). In the 2017 Nepalese local elections, he won the mayoral seat of the newly formed Shahidnagar Municipality with 5,091 votes.

During his tenure, he focused on road blacktopping, restarting a stalled hospital project, education reform, and social inclusion. In 2019, he cracked down on unauthorised private schools, stating “no compromise on education”. He participated in the Kamala River revival campaign in 2019.

In 2020, he publicly opposed his party’s Citizenship Bill provision requiring a 7-year wait for foreign brides, citing harm to Madhesi sentiments. During intra-party disputes, he was active in anti-Oli faction rallies in Province 2.

He contested the 2022 Nepalese local elections but finished third with 4,077 votes; the seat was won by Dinesh Prasad Yadav of the Janata Samajbadi Party (5,743 votes).

Post-tenure, he has remained active in local politics, including farmer advocacy against fertilizer smuggling at borders and mosquito control criticisms.

== Controversies ==
In March 2018, he suspended a school principal over alleged financial irregularities, triggering a dispute with the Chief District Officer who overturned the decision.

In April 2020, municipal officials under his administration were accused of detaining journalists investigating COVID-19 quarantine conditions, though involvement was denied.

On 4 February 2021, during anti-Oli protests in Janakpur, he sustained serious head injuries in a police clash and was airlifted to Kathmandu.

The Commission for the Investigation of Abuse of Authority (CIAA) filed two corruption cases against him; he was acquitted in both:

- 2017–18 road project (NPR 212,816 alleged loss) – acquitted 2023; CIAA appealed 2024.
- 2020–21 sanitary pad procurement – acquitted 2024.

A satirical article in 2021 humorously critiqued his political style during Holi festivities.

== Personal life ==
Yadav is married to Preeti Yadav and remains active in Madhesh Province politics.
