= Balabakhar =

Balabakhar बालाबखर
- Ward
- Ward in Nepal
- Interactive map of Balabakhar
- Coordinates: 26.77°N 86.13°E
- Country: Nepal
- Province: Madhesh
- District: Dhanusa
- Municipality: Shahidnagar
- Ward Number: 1

Government
  - President: Tejilal Yadav
  - Secretary: Rohit Kumar Shah

Population (2021)
  - Total: 8,776: 4,325(M); 4,451(F)

Languages
  - Local: Maithili
- Time zone: UTC+5:45 (Nepal Time)

Balabakhar is a Ward (formerly VDC) in Shahidnagar Municipality in Dhanusa District in the Madhesh Province of Nepal. At the time of the 2021 Nepal census it had a population of 8,776 persons.
