= Chorakoyalpur =

Chorakoyalpur चोराकोइलपुर
- Ward
- Ward in Nepal
- Location in Nepal
- Coordinates: 26.75°N 86.11°E
- Country: Nepal
- Province: Madhesh
- District: Dhanusa
- Municipality: Shahidnagar
- Ward Number: 2

Government
  - President: Satendra Kumar Chorwar Yadav
  - Secretary: Deep Kumar Mahato

Population (2021)
  - Total: 5,266: 2,620(M); 2,646(F)

Languages
  - Local: Maithili
- Time zone: UTC+5:45 (Nepal Time)

Chorakoyalpur is a Ward (formerly VDC) in Shahidnagar Municipality in Dhanusa District in the Madhesh Province of Nepal. At the time of the 2021 Nepal census, it had a population of 5,266 persons.
