= Bhaisipankha =

Bhaisipankha भइसिपंखा
- Former Village Development Committee (पूर्व गाउँ विकास समिति)
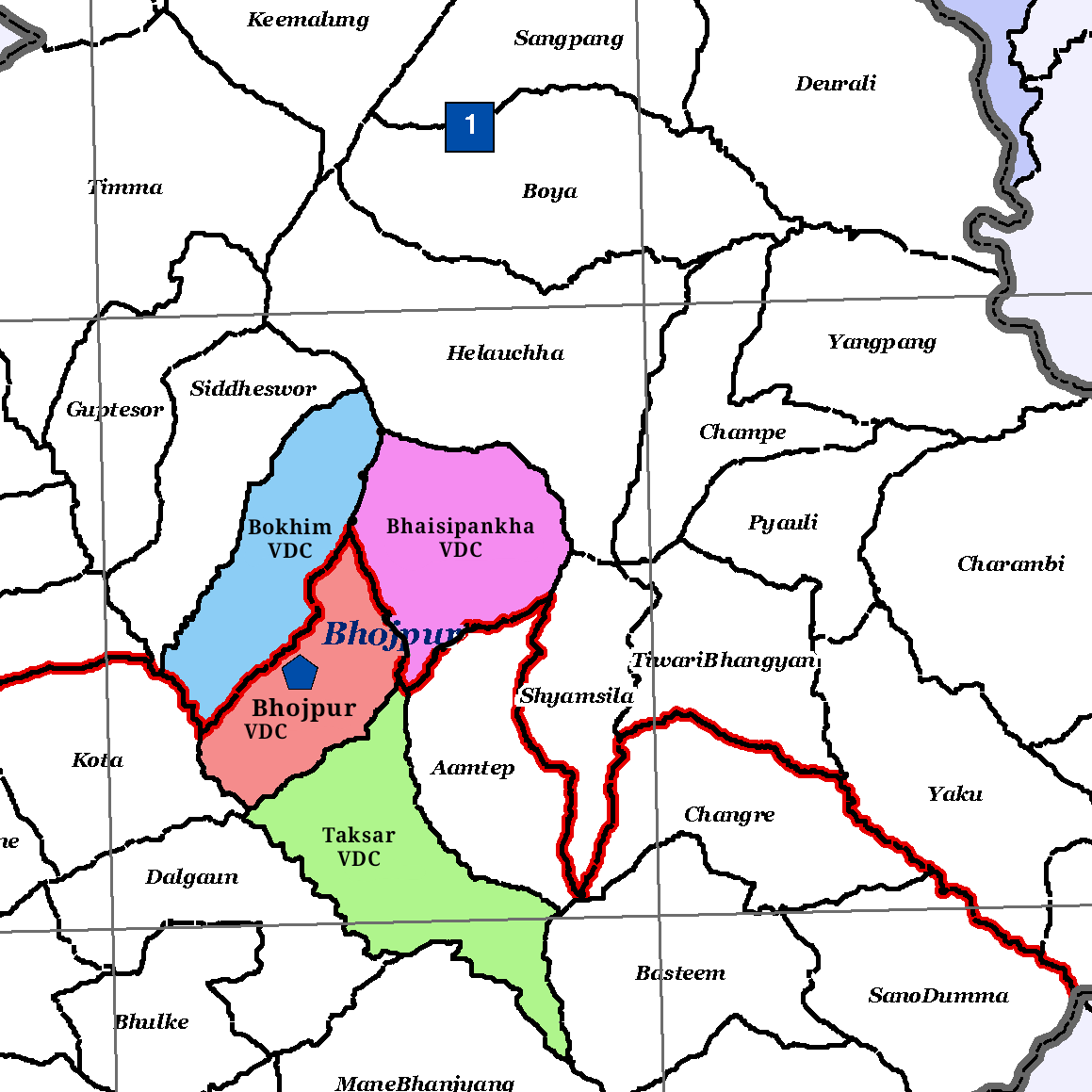
- Map of Bhojpur Municipality before 2017 showing Bhaisipankha VDC as neighborhood

- Location in Nepal Bhaisipankha (Nepal)
- Coordinates: 27.20°N 87.08°E
- Country: Nepal
- Provinces: Koshi Province
- District: Bhojpur District
- Municipalities: Bhojpur Municipality
- Established: 2017

Government
  - Type: Ward council
  - Body: Bhojpur Municipality
  - Chairperson: Subindra Rai

Area
  - Total: 18.28 km^{2} (7.06 sq mi)

Population (2011)
  - Total: 2,434
  - Density: 133.2/km^{2} (344.9/sq mi)
- Time zone: UTC+5:45 (Nepal Time)

Bhaisipankha is a former Village Development Committee and now a neighborhood of Bhojpur Municipality in Bhojpur District in the Koshi Province of eastern Nepal. At the time of the 1991 census it had a population of 3,077 persons living in 555 individual households.

On 18 May 2014 the Government of Nepal declared 72 new municipalities within the whole country. At the same time Bhojpur Municipality was declared, incorporating Bhojpur, Bhaisipankha, Bokhim and Taksar VDCs divided into 11 ward units.

Now total population of Bhaisipankha (according to the 2011 Nepal census) is 2,434 individuals and area of the Bhaisipankha is 18.28 square kilometres (7.06 sq mi). It is Ward No. 10 of Bhojpur Municipality.

Bhojpur Municipality
Neighborhood	Ward no.	Area	Population (2011)	Ward chairperson
Bhaisipankha	10	18.28 km^{2}	2,434	Subindra Rai
