= Pacharhwa =

Pacharhwa पचहर्वा
- Ward
- Ward in Nepal
- Location in Nepal
- Coordinates: 26.72°N 86.07°E
- Country: Nepal
- Province: Madhesh
- District: Dhanusa
- Municipality: Shahidnagar
- Ward Number: 5

Government
  - President: Suresh Kapar
  - Secretary: Satyanarayan Mandal

Population (2021)
  - Total: 4,192: 2,031(M); 2,161(F)

Languages
  - Local: Maithili
- Time zone: UTC+5:45 (Nepal Time)

Pacharhwa is a Ward (formerly VDC) in Shahidnagar Municipality in Dhanusa District in the Madhesh Province of Nepal. At the time of the 2021 Nepal census it had a population of 4,192 persons.
