= Dhabauli (Nepal) =

Dhabauli धवौली
- Ward
- Dhabauli
- Location in Nepal
- Coordinates: 26.71°N 86.11°E
- Country: Nepal
- Province: Madhesh
- District: Dhanusa
- Municipality: Shahidnagar
- Ward Number: 7

Government
  - President: Maheshwar Mandal
  - Secretary: Satyanarayan Mandal

Population (2021)
  - Total: 8,302: 4,007(M); 4,295(F)

Languages
  - Local: Maithili
- Time zone: UTC+5:45 (Nepal Time)

Dhabauli is a Ward (formerly VDC) in Shahidnagar Municipality in Dhanusa District in the Madhesh Province of Nepal. At the time of the 2021 Nepal census it had a population of 8,302 persons.
