= Harwada =

Harwada हरवडा
- Ward
- Ward in Nepal
- Location in Nepal
- Coordinates: 26°43′05″N 86°04′15″E
- Country: Nepal
- Province: Madhesh
- District: Dhanusa
- Municipality: Shahidnagar
- Ward Number: 6

Government
  - President: Umesh Kumar Nirala

Population (2021)
  - Total: 4,550: 2,201(M); 2,161(F)

Languages
  - Local: Maithili
- Time zone: UTC+5:45 (Nepal Time)

Harwada is a Ward (formerly VDC) in Shahidnagar Municipality in Dhanusa District in the Madhesh Province of Nepal. At the time of the 2021 Nepal census it had a population of 4,550 persons.
