= Bhojpur Airport =

Bhojpur Airport भोजपुर विमानस्थल
- IATA: BHP; ICAO: VNBJ

Summary
- Airport type: Public
- Owner: Government of Nepal
- Operator: Civil Aviation Authority of Nepal
- Serves: Bhojpur, Nepal
- Location: Bhojpur Municipality, Bhojpur District, Kosi Zone, Koshi Province, East Nepal
- Focus city for: Nepal Airlines; Tara Air
- Time zone: NST (UTC+05:45)
- Elevation AMSL: 4,000 ft (1,200 m)
- Coordinates: 27°08′51″N 87°03′03″E

Map
- Location of airport in Nepal

Runways
Direction	Length		Surface
Direction	m	ft	Surface
17/35	533	1,750	Asphalt concrete

Bhojpur Airport (IATA: BHP, ICAO: VNBJ) is a domestic airport serving Bhojpur, a town in the Bhojpur District in Koshi Province in Nepal.

== Facilities ==
The airport resides at an elevation of 4,000 feet (1,219 m) above sea level. It has single runway which is 533 metres (1,749 ft) in length. This airport has helped the people of Bhojpur to connect with regional capital Biratnagar and National Capital Kathmandu.

== Airlines and destinations ==
Airlines	Destinations
Nepal Airlines	Biratnagar, Kathmandu
Tara Air	Kathmandu

== See also ==
- List of airports in Nepal
