= Bhojpur, Nepal =

Headquarters of Bhojpur District, Nepal

Bhojpur भोजपुर
- Former Village Development Committee (पूर्व गाउँ विकास समिति)
- Location Bhojpur (Nepal)
- Coordinates: 27°10′N 87°3′E
- Country: Nepal
- Province: Province No. 1
- District: Bhojpur
- Municipality: Bhojpur Municipality
- Wards: 6, 7, 8 & 9
- Established: 10 March 2017

Government
  - Type: Ward council
  - Term of office: (2017 - 2022)

Area
  - Total: 13.45 km^{2} (5.19 sq mi)

Population (2011)
  - Total: 7,446
  - Density: 553.6/km^{2} (1,434/sq mi)
- Time zone: UTC+5:45 (Nepal Standard Time)
- Website: www.bhojpurmun.gov.np

Bhojpur (Nepali: भोजपुर) is a neighborhood in Bhojpur Municipality which is located in Bhojpur District in Province No. 1 of Nepal. The Bhojpur Village Panchayat was established in 1962 and was renamed Bhojpur Village Development Committee in 1990.

On 18 May 2014 the Government of Nepal declared 72 new municipalities within the country. These included Bhojpur Municipality, incorporating Bhojpur, Bhaisipankha, Bokhim and Taksar VDCs. Current wards no. 6, 7, 8 and 9 of Bhojpur Municipality belong to the core Bhojpur area which is the main urbanized settlement of Bhojpur Municipality.

At the 1991 Nepal census Bhojpur VDC had a population of 7,446 individuals with 2,070 households. Now the total population of the Bhojpur (2011 Nepal census) is 7,446 spread over 13.45 square kilometres (5.19 sq mi). The headquarter of the Bhojpur District and the Bhojpur Municipality is located at ward no. 7 of the Bhojpur Municipality.

Bhojpur Municipality
Before 2017	After 2017
Bhojpur & other VDCs	Bhojpur VDC divided into wards (6, 7, 8, 9)

Bhojpur Municipality
Neighborhood	Ward no.	Area	Population (2011)	Ward chairperson
Bhojpur	6	4.03 km^{2}	1,710	Shailendra Karki
Bhojpur	7	2.29 km^{2}	2,805	Jai Bahadur Taamang
Bhojpur	8	4.75 km^{2}	1,160	Gopal Karki
Bhojpur	9	2.38 km^{2}	1,771	Ram Bahadur Taamang

== Climate ==
Climate data for Bhojpur, elevation 1,595 m (5,233 ft), (1976–2005)
Month	Jan	Feb	Mar	Apr	May	Jun	Jul	Aug	Sep	Oct	Nov	Dec	Year
Mean daily maximum °C (°F)	13.5 (56.3)	15.4 (59.7)	19.8 (67.6)	22.9 (73.2)	23.5 (74.3)	24.1 (75.4)	23.8 (74.8)	24.1 (75.4)	23.3 (73.9)	21.6 (70.9)	18.6 (65.5)	15.1 (59.2)	20.5 (68.9)
Mean daily minimum °C (°F)	5.0 (41.0)	6.6 (43.9)	10.4 (50.7)	13.7 (56.7)	15.5 (59.9)	17.5 (63.5)	18.0 (64.4)	17.8 (64.0)	16.9 (62.4)	13.8 (56.8)	10.2 (50.4)	6.4 (43.5)	12.7 (54.8)
Average precipitation mm (inches)	20.4 (0.80)	12.3 (0.48)	29.9 (1.18)	70.1 (2.76)	143.1 (5.63)	215.5 (8.48)	277.7 (10.93)	218.3 (8.59)	168.8 (6.65)	79.3 (3.12)	14.7 (0.58)	9.3 (0.37)	1,259.4 (49.57)
Source 1: Agricultural Extension in South Asia
Source 2: Japan International Cooperation Agency (precipitation)
