= Helauchha =

Helauchha हेलौछा
- Neighborhood
- Location in Province Helauchha (Nepal)
- Coordinates: 27.24°N 87.09°E
- Country: Nepal
- Province: Province No. 1
- District: Bhojpur District
- Municipality: Bhojpur Municipality
- Ward No.: 1 & 2
- Established: 10 March 2017

Government
  - Type: Ward Councils
  - Ward Chairperson (1): Bishnu Kumar Bhujel
  - Ward Chairperson (2): Kumar Rai

Area
  - Total: 39.85 km^{2} (15.39 sq mi)

Population (2011)
  - Total: 3,711
  - Density: 93.12/km^{2} (241.2/sq mi)
- Time zone: UTC+5:45 (Nepal Time)

Helauchha is a Neighborhood (formerly a VDC) in Bhojpur Municipality of Bhojpur District in the Province No. 1 of eastern Nepal. At the time of the 1991 Nepal census it had a population of 4,034 persons living in 725 individual households.
