= Shahidnagar Municipality =

Shahidnagar Municipality शहीदनगर नगरपालिका
- Municipality
- Municipality in Nepal
- Location in Nepal
- Coordinates: 26°44′10″N 86°06′30″E
- Country: Nepal
- Province: Madhesh Province
- District: Dhanusa District

Government
  - Mayor: Dinesh Prasad Yadav
  - Deputy Mayor: Sunita Kumari Singh (NC)

Area
  - Total: 57.37 km^{2} (22.15 sq mi)

Population (2021)
  - Total: 53,812
  - Density: 938.0/km^{2} (2,429/sq mi)
  - Religions: Hindu Muslim Christian

Languages
  - Local: Maithili, Tharu, Nepali
- Time zone: UTC+5:45 (NST)
- Postal Code: 45600
- Area code: 041
- Website: https://www.shahidnagarmun.gov.np/

Shahidnagar Municipality (Nepali: शहीदनगर ) is a municipality in Dhanusa District in Madhesh Province of Nepal. It was formed in 2016 occupying current 9 sections (wards) from previous 9 VDCs. It occupies an area of 57.37 km^{2} with a total population of 53,812 living in 11,124 households.

== Wards ==
- Balabakhar (Ward No. 1)
- Chorakoyalpur (Ward No. 2)
- Yadukuha (Ward No. 3)
- Nannupatti (Ward No. 4)
- Pacharhwa (Ward No. 5)
- Harwada (Ward No. 6)
- Dhabauli (Ward No. 7)
- Nathpatti Bisarbhora (Ward No. 8)
- Gothakoyalpur (Ward No. 9)

== Transport ==
=== Roadways ===
Frequent bus services operate between Shahidnagar Municipality Wards Village and Nepalese cities. Nowadays, electric rickshaws are in frequent use.

== Culture ==
=== Religious sites ===
There are several Hindu Temples and Masjid located in this municipality.

=== Festivals ===
Major religious celebrations include the Hindu festivals Dipawali, and Vijayadashami, followed by Chhath Puja, which is celebrated six days after Diwali and Makar Sankranti.
