= Siddheshwar, Bhojpur =

Siddheshwar, Kosi सिद्धेश्वर
- Village development committee
- Location in Nepal
- Coordinates: 27.23°N 87.03°E
- Country: Nepal
- Zone: Kosi Zone
- District: Bhojpur District

Population (1991)
  - Total: 3,390
- Time zone: UTC+5:45 (Nepal Time)

Siddheshwar is a village development committee in Bhojpur District in the Kosi Zone of eastern Nepal. At the time of the 1991 Nepal census it had a population of 3390 persons living in 630 individual households. Two major bazaars are Dama on the northwest ridge, where the secondary school is located, and Mandre in the eastern valley where the middle school is located.
