= Gupteshwar, Nepal =

Coordinates: 27°14′N 87°0′E

Gupteshwar गुप्तेश्वर
- Village development committee
- Interactive map of Gupteshwar
- Country: Nepal
- Zone: Kosi Zone
- District: Bhojpur District

Population (1991)
  - Total: 2,232
- Time zone: UTC+5:45 (Nepal Time)

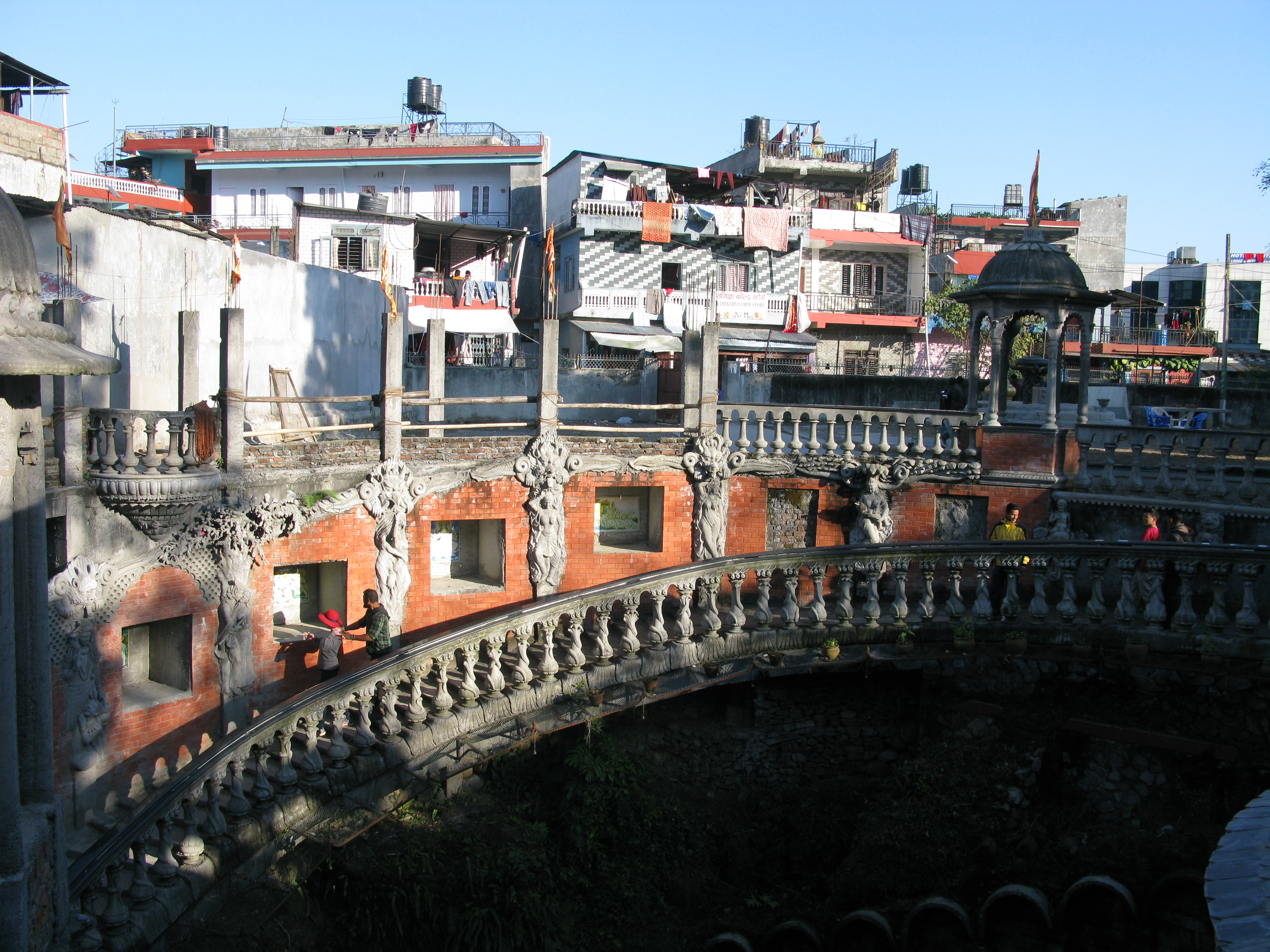
Great monument at Gupteshwor

Gupteshwar is a village development committee in Bhojpur District in the Kosi Zone of eastern Nepal. At the time of the 1991 Nepal census it had a population of 2232 persons living in 418 individual households.
