= Wards and electoral divisions of Nepal =

A ward (Nepali: वडा) is the smallest unit of local governments in Nepal. The local level body (gaunpalika and municipality) which is divided into 753 units, are further divided into 6,743 wards. These wards were previously either a single VDC or a part of VDC. A local level unit is divided into a minimum five wards or a maximum of 33 wards.

== No. of wards (district and province wise) ==
District	Province	Area (km^{2})	Population (2011)	Wards
Bhojpur District	Koshi	1,509	182,459	81
Dhankuta District	Koshi	892	163,412	60
Ilam District	Koshi	1,703	290,254	81
Jhapa District	Koshi	1,606	812,650	131
Khotang District	Koshi	1,591	206,312	79
Morang District	Koshi	1,855	965,370	159
Okhaldhunga District	Koshi	1,074	147,984	75
Panchthar District	Koshi	1,241	191,817	60
Sankhuwasabha District	Koshi	3,480	158,742	76
Solukhumbu District	Koshi	3,312	105,886	52
Sunsari District	Koshi	1,257	763,497	124
Taplejung District	Koshi	3,646	127,461	61
Terhathum District	Koshi	679	113,111	43
Udayapur District	Koshi	2,063	317,532	75
Parsa District	Madhesh	1,353	601,017	112
Bara District	Madhesh	1,190	687,708	167
Rautahat District	Madhesh	1,126	686,723	157
Sarlahi District	Madhesh	1,259	769,729	200
Dhanusa District	Madhesh	1,180	754,777	169
Siraha District	Madhesh	1,188	637,328	164
Mahottari District	Madhesh	1,002	627,580	138
Saptari District	Madhesh	1,363	639,284	164
Sindhuli District	Bagmati	2,491	296,192	79
Ramechhap District	Bagmati	1,546	202,646	64
Dolakha District	Bagmati	2,191	186,557	74
Bhaktapur District	Bagmati	119	304,651	38
Dhading District	Bagmati	1,926	336,067	104
Kathmandu District	Bagmati	395	1,744,240	138
Kavrepalanchok District	Bagmati	1,396	381,937	135
Lalitpur District	Bagmati	385	468,132	71
Nuwakot District	Bagmati	1,121	277,471	88
Rasuwa District	Bagmati	1,544	43,300	27
Sindhupalchok District	Bagmati	2,542	287,798	103
Chitwan District	Bagmati	2,218	579,984	98
Makwanpur District	Bagmati	2,426	420,477	102
Baglung District	Gandaki	1,784	268,613	85
Gorkha District	Gandaki	3,610	271,061	94
Kaski District	Gandaki	2,017	492,098	72
Lamjung District	Gandaki	1,692	167,724	75
Manang District	Gandaki	2,246	6,538	28
Mustang District	Gandaki	3,573	13,452	25
Myagdi District	Gandaki	2,297	113,641	45
Nawalpur District	Gandaki	1,043.1	310,864	92
Parbat District	Gandaki	494	146,590	61
Syangja District	Gandaki	1,164	289,148	97
Tanahun District	Gandaki	1,546	323,288	85
Kapilvastu District	Lumbini	1,738	571,936	96
Parasi District	Lumbini	634.88	321,058	74
Rupandehi District	Lumbini	1,360	880,196	155
Arghakhanchi District	Lumbini	1,193	197,632	61
Gulmi District	Lumbini	1,149	280,160	93
Palpa District	Lumbini	1,373	261,180	81
Dang Deukhuri District	Lumbini	2,955	552,583	100
Pyuthan District	Lumbini	1,309	228,102	64
Rolpa District	Lumbini	1,879	224,506	72
Eastern Rukum District	Lumbini	1,161.13	53,018	31
Banke District	Lumbini	2,337	491,313	81
Bardiya District	Lumbini	2,025	426,576	75
Western Rukum District	Karnali	1,213.49	154,272	73
Salyan District	Karnali	1,462	242,444	83
Dolpa District	Karnali	7,889	36,700	65
Humla District	Karnali	5,655	50,858	44
Jumla District	Karnali	2,531	108,921	60
Kalikot District	Karnali	1,741	136,948	82
Mugu District	Karnali	3,535	55,286	45
Surkhet District	Karnali	2,451	350,804	99
Dailekh District	Karnali	1,502	261,770	90
Jajarkot District	Karnali	2,230	171,304	77
Kailali District	Sudurpashchim	3,235	775,709	126
Achham District	Sudurpashchim	1,680	257,477	91
Doti District	Sudurpashchim	2,025	211,746	65
Bajhang District	Sudurpashchim	3,422	195,159	94
Bajura District	Sudurpashchim	2,188	134,912	69
Kanchanpur District	Sudurpashchim	1,610	451,248	92
Dadeldhura District	Sudurpashchim	1,538	142,094	52
Baitadi District	Sudurpashchim	1,519	250,898	84
Darchula District	Sudurpashchim	2,322	133,274	61
77	7	147,641.28	26,494,504	6,743

== No. of wards (local level body wise) ==
There are 753 local government bodies which are further divided into 6743 wards which is the smallest unit of local government in Nepal.

Province	Districts	जिल्ला	Headquarters	Area (km^{2})	Local Bodies	Number of Wards
Koshi	Bhojpur	भोजपुर	Bhojpur	1507	Shadananda Municipality	14
Koshi	Bhojpur	भोजपुर	Bhojpur	1507	Bhojpur Municipality	12
Koshi	Bhojpur	भोजपुर	Bhojpur	1507	Aamchowk Gaunpalika	10
Koshi	Bhojpur	भोजपुर	Bhojpur	1507	Hatuwagadhi Gaunpalika	9
Koshi	Bhojpur	भोजपुर	Bhojpur	1507	Temkemaiyum Gaunpalika	9
Koshi	Bhojpur	भोजपुर	Bhojpur	1507	Ramprasad Rai Gaunpalika	8
Koshi	Bhojpur	भोजपुर	Bhojpur	1507	Arun Gaunpalika	7
Koshi	Bhojpur	भोजपुर	Bhojpur	1507	Pauwa Dunma Gaunpalika	6
Koshi	Bhojpur	भोजपुर	Bhojpur	1507	Salpa Silichho Gaunpalika	6
Koshi	Dhankuta	धनकुटा	Dhankuta	892	Dhankuta Municipality	10
Koshi	Dhankuta	धनकुटा	Dhankuta	892	Pakhribas Municipality	10
Koshi	Dhankuta	धनकुटा	Dhankuta	892	Sangurigadhi Gaunpalika	10
Koshi	Dhankuta	धनकुटा	Dhankuta	892	Mahalaxmi Municipality	9
Koshi	Dhankuta	धनकुटा	Dhankuta	892	Chaubise Gaunpalika	8
Koshi	Dhankuta	धनकुटा	Dhankuta	892	Shahidbhumi Gaunpalika	7
Koshi	Dhankuta	धनकुटा	Dhankuta	892	Chhathar Jorpati Gaunpalika	6
Koshi	Ilam	इलाम	Ilam	1703	Suryodaya Municipality	14
Koshi	Ilam	इलाम	Ilam	1703	Illam Municipality	12
Koshi	Ilam	इलाम	Ilam	1703	Mai Municipality	10
Koshi	Ilam	इलाम	Ilam	1703	Deumai Municipality	9
Koshi	Ilam	इलाम	Ilam	1703	Fakfokathum Gaunpalika	7
Koshi	Ilam	इलाम	Ilam	1703	Chulachuli Gaunpalika	6
Koshi	Ilam	इलाम	Ilam	1703	Mai Jogmai Gaunpalika	6
Koshi	Ilam	इलाम	Ilam	1703	Mangsebung Gaunpalika	6
Koshi	Ilam	इलाम	Ilam	1703	Rong Gaunpalika	6
Koshi	Ilam	इलाम	Ilam	1703	Sandakpur Gaunpalika	5
Koshi	Jhapa	झापा	Bhadrapur	1606	Mechinagar Municipality	15
Koshi	Jhapa	झापा	Bhadrapur	1606	Arjundhara Municipality	11
Koshi	Jhapa	झापा	Bhadrapur	1606	Shivasatakshi Municipality	11
Koshi	Jhapa	झापा	Bhadrapur	1606	Bhadrapur Municipality	10
Koshi	Jhapa	झापा	Bhadrapur	1606	Birtamod Municipality	10
Koshi	Jhapa	झापा	Bhadrapur	1606	Damak Municipality	10
Koshi	Jhapa	झापा	Bhadrapur	1606	Gauradaha Municipality	9
Koshi	Jhapa	झापा	Bhadrapur	1606	Kankai Municipality	9
Koshi	Jhapa	झापा	Bhadrapur	1606	Barhadashi Gaunpalika	7
Koshi	Jhapa	झापा	Bhadrapur	1606	Buddhashanti Gaunpalika	7
Koshi	Jhapa	झापा	Bhadrapur	1606	Jhapa Gaunpalika	7
Koshi	Jhapa	झापा	Bhadrapur	1606	Kachanakawal Gaunpalika	7
Koshi	Jhapa	झापा	Bhadrapur	1606	Kamal Gaunpalika	7
Koshi	Jhapa	झापा	Bhadrapur	1606	Gauriganj Gaunpalika	6
Koshi	Jhapa	झापा	Bhadrapur	1606	Haldibari Gaunpalika	5
Koshi	Khotang	खोटाँग	Diktel	1591	Diktel Rupakot Majhuwagadhi Municipality	15
Koshi	Khotang	खोटाँग	Diktel	1591	Halesi Tuwachung Municipality	11
Koshi	Khotang	खोटाँग	Diktel	1591	Khotehang Gaunpalika	9
Koshi	Khotang	खोटाँग	Diktel	1591	Aiselukharka Gaunpalika	7
Koshi	Khotang	खोटाँग	Diktel	1591	Diprung Chuichumma Gaunpalika	7
Koshi	Khotang	खोटाँग	Diktel	1591	Kepilasgadhi Gaunpalika	7
Koshi	Khotang	खोटाँग	Diktel	1591	Baraha Pokhari Gaunpalika	6
Koshi	Khotang	खोटाँग	Diktel	1591	Jante Dhunga Gaunpalika	6
Koshi	Khotang	खोटाँग	Diktel	1591	Rawa Besi Gaunpalika	6
Koshi	Khotang	खोटाँग	Diktel	1591	Sakela Gaunpalika	5
Koshi	Morang	मोरंग	Biratnagar	1855	Biratnagar Metropolitan City	19
Koshi	Morang	मोरंग	Biratnagar	1855	Sundarharaicha Municipality	12
Koshi	Morang	मोरंग	Biratnagar	1855	Belbari Municipality	11
Koshi	Morang	मोरंग	Biratnagar	1855	Kerabari Gaunpalika	10
Koshi	Morang	मोरंग	Biratnagar	1855	Pathari Shanishchare Municipality	10
Koshi	Morang	मोरंग	Biratnagar	1855	Ratuwamai Municipality	10
Koshi	Morang	मोरंग	Biratnagar	1855	Letang Municipality	9
Koshi	Morang	मोरंग	Biratnagar	1855	Miklajung Gaunpalika	9
Koshi	Morang	मोरंग	Biratnagar	1855	Rangeli Municipality	9
Koshi	Morang	मोरंग	Biratnagar	1855	Sunwarshi Municipality	9
Koshi	Morang	मोरंग	Biratnagar	1855	Urlabari Municipality	9
Koshi	Morang	मोरंग	Biratnagar	1855	Budhiganga Gaunpalika	7
Koshi	Morang	मोरंग	Biratnagar	1855	Dhanapalthan Gaunpalika	7
Koshi	Morang	मोरंग	Biratnagar	1855	Gramthan Gaunpalika	7
Koshi	Morang	मोरंग	Biratnagar	1855	Jahada Gaunpalika	7
Koshi	Morang	मोरंग	Biratnagar	1855	Kanepokhari Gaunpalika	7
Koshi	Morang	मोरंग	Biratnagar	1855	Katahari Gaunpalika	7
Koshi	Okhaldhunga	ओखलढुंगा	Siddhicharan	1074	Siddhicharan Municipality	12
Koshi	Okhaldhunga	ओखलढुंगा	Siddhicharan	1074	Champadevi Gaunpalika	10
Koshi	Okhaldhunga	ओखलढुंगा	Siddhicharan	1074	Sunkoshi Gaunpalika	10
Koshi	Okhaldhunga	ओखलढुंगा	Siddhicharan	1074	Khiji Demba Gaunpalika	9
Koshi	Okhaldhunga	ओखलढुंगा	Siddhicharan	1074	Likhu Gaunpalika	9
Koshi	Okhaldhunga	ओखलढुंगा	Siddhicharan	1074	Manebhanjyang Gaunpalika	9
Koshi	Okhaldhunga	ओखलढुंगा	Siddhicharan	1074	Chishankhu Gadhi Gaunpalika	8
Koshi	Okhaldhunga	ओखलढुंगा	Siddhicharan	1074	Molung Gaunpalika	8
Koshi	Panchthar	पांचथर	Phidim	1241	Phidim Municipality	14
Koshi	Panchthar	पांचथर	Phidim	1241	Falelung Gaunpalika	8
Koshi	Panchthar	पांचथर	Phidim	1241	Miklajung Gaunpalika	8
Koshi	Panchthar	पांचथर	Phidim	1241	Falgunanda Gaunpalika	7
Koshi	Panchthar	पांचथर	Phidim	1241	Hilihan Gaunpalika	7
Koshi	Panchthar	पांचथर	Phidim	1241	Yangbarak Gaunpalika	6
Koshi	Panchthar	पांचथर	Phidim	1241	Kummayak Gaunpalika	5
Koshi	Panchthar	पांचथर	Phidim	1241	Tumbewa Gaunpalika	5
Koshi	Sankhuwasabha	संखुवासभा	Khandbari	3480	Chainapur Municipality	11
Koshi	Sankhuwasabha	संखुवासभा	Khandbari	3480	Khandabari Municipality	11
Koshi	Sankhuwasabha	संखुवासभा	Khandbari	3480	Dharmadevi Municipality	9
Koshi	Sankhuwasabha	संखुवासभा	Khandbari	3480	Madi Municipality	9
Koshi	Sankhuwasabha	संखुवासभा	Khandbari	3480	Panchakhapan Municipality	9
Koshi	Sankhuwasabha	संखुवासभा	Khandbari	3480	Makalu Gaunpalika	6
Koshi	Sankhuwasabha	संखुवासभा	Khandbari	3480	Sabhapokhari Gaunpalika	6
Koshi	Sankhuwasabha	संखुवासभा	Khandbari	3480	Bhotkhola Gaunpalika	5
Koshi	Sankhuwasabha	संखुवासभा	Khandbari	3480	Chichila Gaunpalika	5
Koshi	Sankhuwasabha	संखुवासभा	Khandbari	3480	Silichong Gaunpalika	5
Koshi	Solukhumbu	सोलुखुम्बू	Salleri	3312	Solu Dhudhakunda Municipality	11
Koshi	Solukhumbu	सोलुखुम्बू	Salleri	3312	Thulung Dudhkoshi Gaunpalika	9
Koshi	Solukhumbu	सोलुखुम्बू	Salleri	3312	Mapya Dudhkoshi Gaunpalika	7
Koshi	Solukhumbu	सोलुखुम्बू	Salleri	3312	Khumbu Pasanglhamu Gaunpalika	5
Koshi	Solukhumbu	सोलुखुम्बू	Salleri	3312	Likhu Pike Gaunpalika	5
Koshi	Solukhumbu	सोलुखुम्बू	Salleri	3312	Mahakulung Gaunpalika	5
Koshi	Solukhumbu	सोलुखुम्बू	Salleri	3312	Necha Salyan Gaunpalika	5
Koshi	Solukhumbu	सोलुखुम्बू	Salleri	3312	Sotang Gaunpalika	5
Koshi	Sunsari	सुनसरी	Inaruwa	1257	Dharan Sub-Metropolitan City	20
Koshi	Sunsari	सुनसरी	Inaruwa	1257	Itahari Sub-Metropolitan City	20
Koshi	Sunsari	सुनसरी	Inaruwa	1257	Duhabi Municipality	12
Koshi	Sunsari	सुनसरी	Inaruwa	1257	Barahachhetra Municipality	11
Koshi	Sunsari	सुनसरी	Inaruwa	1257	Inaruwa Municipality	10
Koshi	Sunsari	सुनसरी	Inaruwa	1257	Ramdhuni Municipality	9
Koshi	Sunsari	सुनसरी	Inaruwa	1257	Bhokraha Narsingh Gaunpalika	8
Koshi	Sunsari	सुनसरी	Inaruwa	1257	Koshi Gaunpalika	8
Koshi	Sunsari	सुनसरी	Inaruwa	1257	Dewangunj Gaunpalika	7
Koshi	Sunsari	सुनसरी	Inaruwa	1257	Harinagar Gaunpalika	7
Koshi	Sunsari	सुनसरी	Inaruwa	1257	Barju Gaunpalika	6
Koshi	Sunsari	सुनसरी	Inaruwa	1257	Gadhi Gaunpalika	6
Koshi	Taplejung	ताप्लेजुंग	Taplejung	3646	Phungling Municipality	11
Koshi	Taplejung	ताप्लेजुंग	Taplejung	3646	Sirijanga Gaunpalika	8
Koshi	Taplejung	ताप्लेजुंग	Taplejung	3646	Phaktanlung Gaunpalika	7
Koshi	Taplejung	ताप्लेजुंग	Taplejung	3646	Sidingba Gaunpalika	7
Koshi	Taplejung	ताप्लेजुंग	Taplejung	3646	Maiwakhola Gaunpalika	6
Koshi	Taplejung	ताप्लेजुंग	Taplejung	3646	Meringden Gaunpalika	6
Koshi	Taplejung	ताप्लेजुंग	Taplejung	3646	Pathivara Yangwarak Gaunpalika	6
Koshi	Taplejung	ताप्लेजुंग	Taplejung	3646	Aatharai Tribeni Gaunpalika	5
Koshi	Taplejung	ताप्लेजुंग	Taplejung	3646	Mikwakhola Gaunpalika	5
Koshi	Terhathum	तेह्रथुम	Myanglung	679	Myanglung Municipality	10
Koshi	Terhathum	तेह्रथुम	Myanglung	679	Laligurans Municipality	9
Koshi	Terhathum	तेह्रथुम	Myanglung	679	Aatharai Gaunpalika	7
Koshi	Terhathum	तेह्रथुम	Myanglung	679	Chhathar Gaunpalika	6
Koshi	Terhathum	तेह्रथुम	Myanglung	679	Menchhayayem Gaunpalika	6
Koshi	Terhathum	तेह्रथुम	Myanglung	679	Phedap Gaunpalika	5
Koshi	Udayapur	उदयपुर	Gaighat	2063	Triyuga Municipality	16
Koshi	Udayapur	उदयपुर	Gaighat	2063	Katari Municipality	14
Koshi	Udayapur	उदयपुर	Gaighat	2063	Chaudandigadhi Municipality	10
Koshi	Udayapur	उदयपुर	Gaighat	2063	Belaka Municipality	9
Koshi	Udayapur	उदयपुर	Gaighat	2063	Rautamai Gaunpalika	8
Koshi	Udayapur	उदयपुर	Gaighat	2063	Udayapurgadhi Gaunpalika	8
Koshi	Udayapur	उदयपुर	Gaighat	2063	Limchunbung Gaunpalika	5
Koshi	Udayapur	उदयपुर	Gaighat	2063	Tapli Gaunpalika	5
Madhesh	Bara	बारा	Kalaiya	1190	Kalaiya Sub-Metropolitan City	27
Madhesh	Bara	बारा	Kalaiya	1190	Jitpur Simara Sub-Metropolitan City	24
Madhesh	Bara	बारा	Kalaiya	1190	Nijagadh Municipality	13
Madhesh	Bara	बारा	Kalaiya	1190	Kolhabi Municipality	11
Madhesh	Bara	बारा	Kalaiya	1190	Mahagadhimai Municipality	11
Madhesh	Bara	बारा	Kalaiya	1190	Simroungadh Municipality	11
Madhesh	Bara	बारा	Kalaiya	1190	Pacharauta Municipality	9
Madhesh	Bara	बारा	Kalaiya	1190	Aadarsha Kotwal Gaunpalika	8
Madhesh	Bara	बारा	Kalaiya	1190	Karaiyamai Gaunpalika	8
Madhesh	Bara	बारा	Kalaiya	1190	Subarna Gaunpalika	8
Madhesh	Bara	बारा	Kalaiya	1190	Devtal Gaunpalika	7
Madhesh	Bara	बारा	Kalaiya	1190	Pheta Gaunpalika	7
Madhesh	Bara	बारा	Kalaiya	1190	Prasauni Gaunpalika	7
Madhesh	Bara	बारा	Kalaiya	1190	Baragadhi Gaunpalika	6
Madhesh	Bara	बारा	Kalaiya	1190	Bishrampur Gaunpalika	5
Madhesh	Bara	बारा	Kalaiya	1190	Parawanipur Gaunpalika	5
Madhesh	Dhanusa	धनुषा	Janakpur	1180	Janakpurdham Sub-Metropolitan City	25
Madhesh	Dhanusa	धनुषा	Janakpur	1180	Sabaila Municipality	13
Madhesh	Dhanusa	धनुषा	Janakpur	1180	Ganeshman Charnath Municipality	11
Madhesh	Dhanusa	धनुषा	Janakpur	1180	Mithila Municipality	11
Madhesh	Dhanusa	धनुषा	Janakpur	1180	Chhireshwornath Municipality	10
Madhesh	Dhanusa	धनुषा	Janakpur	1180	Mithila Bihari Municipality	10
Madhesh	Dhanusa	धनुषा	Janakpur	1180	Bideha Municipality	9
Madhesh	Dhanusa	धनुषा	Janakpur	1180	Dhanushadham Municipality	9
Madhesh	Dhanusa	धनुषा	Janakpur	1180	Hansapur Municipality	9
Madhesh	Dhanusa	धनुषा	Janakpur	1180	Kamala Municipality	9
Madhesh	Dhanusa	धनुषा	Janakpur	1180	Nagarain Municipality	9
Madhesh	Dhanusa	धनुषा	Janakpur	1180	Shahidnagar Municipality	9
Madhesh	Dhanusa	धनुषा	Janakpur	1180	Laxminiya Gaunpalika	7
Madhesh	Dhanusa	धनुषा	Janakpur	1180	Aurahi Gaunpalika	6
Madhesh	Dhanusa	धनुषा	Janakpur	1180	Janak Nandini Gaunpalika	6
Madhesh	Dhanusa	धनुषा	Janakpur	1180	Mukhiyapatti Musaharmiya Gaunpalika	6
Madhesh	Dhanusa	धनुषा	Janakpur	1180	Bateshwor Gaunpalika	5
Madhesh	Dhanusa	धनुषा	Janakpur	1180	Dhanauji Gaunpalika	5
Madhesh	Mahottari	महोत्तरी	Jaleshwar	1002	Bardibas Municipality	14
Madhesh	Mahottari	महोत्तरी	Jaleshwar	1002	Gaushala Municipality	12
Madhesh	Mahottari	महोत्तरी	Jaleshwar	1002	Jaleshwor Municipality	12
Madhesh	Mahottari	महोत्तरी	Jaleshwar	1002	Balawa Municipality	11
Madhesh	Mahottari	महोत्तरी	Jaleshwar	1002	Manara Shisawa Municipality	10
Madhesh	Mahottari	महोत्तरी	Jaleshwar	1002	Aurahi Municipality	9
Madhesh	Mahottari	महोत्तरी	Jaleshwar	1002	Bhangaha Municipality	9
Madhesh	Mahottari	महोत्तरी	Jaleshwar	1002	Loharpatti Municipality	9
Madhesh	Mahottari	महोत्तरी	Jaleshwar	1002	Matihani Municipality	9
Madhesh	Mahottari	महोत्तरी	Jaleshwar	1002	Ram Gopalpur Municipality	9
Madhesh	Mahottari	महोत्तरी	Jaleshwar	1002	Sonama Gaunpalika	8
Madhesh	Mahottari	महोत्तरी	Jaleshwar	1002	Pipara Gaunpalika	7
Madhesh	Mahottari	महोत्तरी	Jaleshwar	1002	Samsi Gaunpalika	7
Madhesh	Mahottari	महोत्तरी	Jaleshwar	1002	Ekadara Gaunpalika	6
Madhesh	Mahottari	महोत्तरी	Jaleshwar	1002	Mahottari Gaunpalika	6
Madhesh	Parsa	पर्सा	Birganj	1353	Birgunj Metropolitan City	32
Madhesh	Parsa	पर्सा	Birganj	1353	Pokhariya Municipality	10
Madhesh	Parsa	पर्सा	Birganj	1353	Bahudarmai Municipality	9
Madhesh	Parsa	पर्सा	Birganj	1353	Parsagadhi Municipality	9
Madhesh	Parsa	पर्सा	Birganj	1353	Jagarnathpur Gaunpalika	6
Madhesh	Parsa	पर्सा	Birganj	1353	Sakhuwa Prasauni Gaunpalika	6
Madhesh	Parsa	पर्सा	Birganj	1353	Bindabasini Gaunpalika	5
Madhesh	Parsa	पर्सा	Birganj	1353	Chhipaharmai Gaunpalika	5
Madhesh	Parsa	पर्सा	Birganj	1353	Dhobini Gaunpalika	5
Madhesh	Parsa	पर्सा	Birganj	1353	Jirabhawani Gaunpalika	5
Madhesh	Parsa	पर्सा	Birganj	1353	Kalikamai Gaunpalika	5
Madhesh	Parsa	पर्सा	Birganj	1353	Pakaha Mainpur Gaunpalika	5
Madhesh	Parsa	पर्सा	Birganj	1353	Paterwa Sugauli Gaunpalika	5
Madhesh	Parsa	पर्सा	Birganj	1353	Thori Gaunpalika	5
Madhesh	Rautahat	रौतहट	Gaur	1126	Phatuwa Bijayapur Municipality	11
Madhesh	Rautahat	रौतहट	Gaur	1126	Chandrapur Municipality	10
Madhesh	Rautahat	रौतहट	Gaur	1126	Boudhimai Municipality	9
Madhesh	Rautahat	रौतहट	Gaur	1126	Brindaban Municipality	9
Madhesh	Rautahat	रौतहट	Gaur	1126	Dewahi Gonahi Municipality	9
Madhesh	Rautahat	रौतहट	Gaur	1126	Gadhimai Municipality	9
Madhesh	Rautahat	रौतहट	Gaur	1126	Garuda Municipality	9
Madhesh	Rautahat	रौतहट	Gaur	1126	Gaur Municipality	9
Madhesh	Rautahat	रौतहट	Gaur	1126	Gujara Municipality	9
Madhesh	Rautahat	रौतहट	Gaur	1126	Ishanath Municipality	9
Madhesh	Rautahat	रौतहट	Gaur	1126	Katahariya Municipality	9
Madhesh	Rautahat	रौतहट	Gaur	1126	Madhav Narayan Municipality	9
Madhesh	Rautahat	रौतहट	Gaur	1126	Maulapur Municipality	9
Madhesh	Rautahat	रौतहट	Gaur	1126	Paroha Municipality	9
Madhesh	Rautahat	रौतहट	Gaur	1126	Rajdevi Municipality	9
Madhesh	Rautahat	रौतहट	Gaur	1126	Rajpur Municipality	9
Madhesh	Rautahat	रौतहट	Gaur	1126	Durga Bhagawati Gaunpalika	5
Madhesh	Rautahat	रौतहट	Gaur	1126	Yamunamai Gaunpalika	5
Madhesh	Saptari	सप्तरी	Rajbiraj	1363	Rajbiraj Municipality	16
Madhesh	Saptari	सप्तरी	Rajbiraj	1363	Hanumannagar Kankalini Municipality	14
Madhesh	Saptari	सप्तरी	Rajbiraj	1363	Kanchanrup Municipality	12
Madhesh	Saptari	सप्तरी	Rajbiraj	1363	Shambhunath Municipality	12
Madhesh	Saptari	सप्तरी	Rajbiraj	1363	Khadak Municipality	11
Madhesh	Saptari	सप्तरी	Rajbiraj	1363	Saptakoshi Municipality	11
Madhesh	Saptari	सप्तरी	Rajbiraj	1363	Surunga Municipality	11
Madhesh	Saptari	सप्तरी	Rajbiraj	1363	Bode Barsain Municipality	10
Madhesh	Saptari	सप्तरी	Rajbiraj	1363	Dakneshwori Municipality	10
Madhesh	Saptari	सप्तरी	Rajbiraj	1363	Tilathi Koiladi Gaunpalika	8
Madhesh	Saptari	सप्तरी	Rajbiraj	1363	Bishnupur Gaunpalika	7
Madhesh	Saptari	सप्तरी	Rajbiraj	1363	Chhinnamasta Gaunpalika	7
Madhesh	Saptari	सप्तरी	Rajbiraj	1363	Agnisair Krishna Sabaran Gaunpalika	6
Madhesh	Saptari	सप्तरी	Rajbiraj	1363	Balan-Bihul Gaunpalika	6
Madhesh	Saptari	सप्तरी	Rajbiraj	1363	Mahadewa Gaunpalika	6
Madhesh	Saptari	सप्तरी	Rajbiraj	1363	Rajgadh Gaunpalika	6
Madhesh	Saptari	सप्तरी	Rajbiraj	1363	Rupani Gaunpalika	6
Madhesh	Saptari	सप्तरी	Rajbiraj	1363	Tirahut Gaunpalika	5
Madhesh	Sarlahi	सर्लाही	Malangwa	1259	Barahathawa Municipality	18
Madhesh	Sarlahi	सर्लाही	Malangwa	1259	Lalbandi Municipality	17
Madhesh	Sarlahi	सर्लाही	Malangwa	1259	Ishworpur Municipality	15
Madhesh	Sarlahi	सर्लाही	Malangwa	1259	Bagmati Municipality	12
Madhesh	Sarlahi	सर्लाही	Malangwa	1259	Godaita Municipality	12
Madhesh	Sarlahi	सर्लाही	Malangwa	1259	Malangawa Municipality	12
Madhesh	Sarlahi	सर्लाही	Malangwa	1259	Balara Municipality	11
Madhesh	Sarlahi	सर्लाही	Malangwa	1259	Hariwan Municipality	11
Madhesh	Sarlahi	सर्लाही	Malangwa	1259	Kabilashi Municipality	10
Madhesh	Sarlahi	सर्लाही	Malangwa	1259	Chakraghatta Gaunpalika	9
Madhesh	Sarlahi	सर्लाही	Malangwa	1259	Haripur Municipality	9
Madhesh	Sarlahi	सर्लाही	Malangwa	1259	Haripurwa Municipality	9
Madhesh	Sarlahi	सर्लाही	Malangwa	1259	Bishnu Gaunpalika	8
Madhesh	Sarlahi	सर्लाही	Malangwa	1259	Brahmapuri Gaunpalika	7
Madhesh	Sarlahi	सर्लाही	Malangwa	1259	Chandranagar Gaunpalika	7
Madhesh	Sarlahi	सर्लाही	Malangwa	1259	Dhanakaul Gaunpalika	7
Madhesh	Sarlahi	सर्लाही	Malangwa	1259	Kaudena Gaunpalika	7
Madhesh	Sarlahi	सर्लाही	Malangwa	1259	Ramnagar Gaunpalika	7
Madhesh	Sarlahi	सर्लाही	Malangwa	1259	Basbariya Gaunpalika	6
Madhesh	Sarlahi	सर्लाही	Malangwa	1259	Parsa Gaunpalika	6
Madhesh	Siraha	सिराहा	Siraha	1188	Lahan Municipality	24
Madhesh	Siraha	सिराहा	Siraha	1188	Siraha Municipality	22
Madhesh	Siraha	सिराहा	Siraha	1188	Dhangadhimai Municipality	14
Madhesh	Siraha	सिराहा	Siraha	1188	Golbazar Municipality	13
Madhesh	Siraha	सिराहा	Siraha	1188	Kalyanpur Municipality	12
Madhesh	Siraha	सिराहा	Siraha	1188	Mirchaiya Municipality	12
Madhesh	Siraha	सिराहा	Siraha	1188	Karjanha Municipality	11
Madhesh	Siraha	सिराहा	Siraha	1188	Sukhipur Municipality	10
Madhesh	Siraha	सिराहा	Siraha	1188	Laxmipur Patari Gaunpalika	6
Madhesh	Siraha	सिराहा	Siraha	1188	Arnama Gaunpalika	5
Madhesh	Siraha	सिराहा	Siraha	1188	Aurahi Gaunpalika	5
Madhesh	Siraha	सिराहा	Siraha	1188	Bariyarpatti Gaunpalika	5
Madhesh	Siraha	सिराहा	Siraha	1188	Bhagawanpur Gaunpalika	5
Madhesh	Siraha	सिराहा	Siraha	1188	Bishnupur Gaunpalika	5
Madhesh	Siraha	सिराहा	Siraha	1188	Naraha Gaunpalika	5
Madhesh	Siraha	सिराहा	Siraha	1188	Nawarajpur Gaunpalika	5
Madhesh	Siraha	सिराहा	Siraha	1188	Sakhuwa Nankarkatti Gaunpalika	5
Bagmati	Bhaktapur	भक्तपुर	Bhaktapur	119	Bhaktapur Municipality	10
Bagmati	Bhaktapur	भक्तपुर	Bhaktapur	119	Suryabinayak Municipality	10
Bagmati	Bhaktapur	भक्तपुर	Bhaktapur	119	Changunarayan Municipality	9
Bagmati	Bhaktapur	भक्तपुर	Bhaktapur	119	Madhyapur Thimi Municipality	9
Bagmati	Chitawan	चितवन	Bharatpur	2218	Bharatpur Metropolitan City	29
Bagmati	Chitawan	चितवन	Bharatpur	2218	Ratnanagar Municipality	16
Bagmati	Chitawan	चितवन	Bharatpur	2218	Khairahani Municipality	13
Bagmati	Chitawan	चितवन	Bharatpur	2218	Rapti Municipality	13
Bagmati	Chitawan	चितवन	Bharatpur	2218	Kalika Municipality	11
Bagmati	Chitawan	चितवन	Bharatpur	2218	Madi Municipality	9
Bagmati	Chitawan	चितवन	Bharatpur	2218	Ichchha Kamana Gaunpalika	7
Bagmati	Dhading	धादिङ	Nilkantha	1926	Nilkhantha Municipality	14
Bagmati	Dhading	धादिङ	Nilkantha	1926	Thakre Gaunpalika	11
Bagmati	Dhading	धादिङ	Nilkantha	1926	Benighat Rorang Gaunpalika	10
Bagmati	Dhading	धादिङ	Nilkantha	1926	Dhunibenshi Municipality	9
Bagmati	Dhading	धादिङ	Nilkantha	1926	Gajuri Gaunpalika	8
Bagmati	Dhading	धादिङ	Nilkantha	1926	Galchhi Gaunpalika	8
Bagmati	Dhading	धादिङ	Nilkantha	1926	Ganga Jamuna Gaunpalika	7
Bagmati	Dhading	धादिङ	Nilkantha	1926	Jwalamukhi Gaunpalika	7
Bagmati	Dhading	धादिङ	Nilkantha	1926	Siddhalek Gaunpalika	7
Bagmati	Dhading	धादिङ	Nilkantha	1926	Tripurasundari Gaunpalika	7
Bagmati	Dhading	धादिङ	Nilkantha	1926	Rubi Valley Gaunpalika	6
Bagmati	Dhading	धादिङ	Nilkantha	1926	Khaniyabas Gaunpalika	5
Bagmati	Dhading	धादिङ	Nilkantha	1926	Netrawati Dabjong Gaunpalika	5
Bagmati	Dolakha	दोलखा	Bhimeshwar	2191	Bhimeshwor Municipality	9
Bagmati	Dolakha	दोलखा	Bhimeshwar	2191	Gaurishankar Gaunpalika	9
Bagmati	Dolakha	दोलखा	Bhimeshwar	2191	Jiri Municipality	9
Bagmati	Dolakha	दोलखा	Bhimeshwar	2191	Kalinchowk Gaunpalika	9
Bagmati	Dolakha	दोलखा	Bhimeshwar	2191	Baiteshwor Gaunpalika	8
Bagmati	Dolakha	दोलखा	Bhimeshwar	2191	Bigu Gaunpalika	8
Bagmati	Dolakha	दोलखा	Bhimeshwar	2191	Shailung Gaunpalika	8
Bagmati	Dolakha	दोलखा	Bhimeshwar	2191	Melung Gaunpalika	7
Bagmati	Dolakha	दोलखा	Bhimeshwar	2191	Tamakoshi Gaunpalika	7
Bagmati	Kathmandu	काठमाडौँ	Kathmandu	395	Kathmandu Metropolitan City	32
Bagmati	Kathmandu	काठमाडौँ	Kathmandu	395	Chandragiri Municipality	15
Bagmati	Kathmandu	काठमाडौँ	Kathmandu	395	Budhanilkhantha Municipality	13
Bagmati	Kathmandu	काठमाडौँ	Kathmandu	395	Tarakeshwor Municipality	11
Bagmati	Kathmandu	काठमाडौँ	Kathmandu	395	Tokha Municipality	11
Bagmati	Kathmandu	काठमाडौँ	Kathmandu	395	Kirtipur Municipality	10
Bagmati	Kathmandu	काठमाडौँ	Kathmandu	395	Nagarjun Municipality	10
Bagmati	Kathmandu	काठमाडौँ	Kathmandu	395	Dakshinkali Municipality	9
Bagmati	Kathmandu	काठमाडौँ	Kathmandu	395	Gokarneshwor Municipality	9
Bagmati	Kathmandu	काठमाडौँ	Kathmandu	395	Kageshwori Manahara Municipality	9
Bagmati	Kathmandu	काठमाडौँ	Kathmandu	395	Shankharapur Municipality	9
Bagmati	Kavrepalanchok	काभ्रेपलान्चोक	Dhulikhel	1396	Banepa Municipality	14
Bagmati	Kavrepalanchok	काभ्रेपलान्चोक	Dhulikhel	1396	Panchkhal Municipality	13
Bagmati	Kavrepalanchok	काभ्रेपलान्चोक	Dhulikhel	1396	Dhulikhel Municipality	12
Bagmati	Kavrepalanchok	काभ्रेपलान्चोक	Dhulikhel	1396	Mandan Deupur Municipality	12
Bagmati	Kavrepalanchok	काभ्रेपलान्चोक	Dhulikhel	1396	Panauti Municipality	12
Bagmati	Kavrepalanchok	काभ्रेपलान्चोक	Dhulikhel	1396	Roshi Gaunpalika	12
Bagmati	Kavrepalanchok	काभ्रेपलान्चोक	Dhulikhel	1396	Namobuddha Municipality	11
Bagmati	Kavrepalanchok	काभ्रेपलान्चोक	Dhulikhel	1396	Bhumlu Gaunpalika	10
Bagmati	Kavrepalanchok	काभ्रेपलान्चोक	Dhulikhel	1396	Chauri Deurali Gaunpalika	9
Bagmati	Kavrepalanchok	काभ्रेपलान्चोक	Dhulikhel	1396	Temal Gaunpalika	9
Bagmati	Kavrepalanchok	काभ्रेपलान्चोक	Dhulikhel	1396	Mahabharat Gaunpalika	8
Bagmati	Kavrepalanchok	काभ्रेपलान्चोक	Dhulikhel	1396	Khanikhola Gaunpalika	7
Bagmati	Kavrepalanchok	काभ्रेपलान्चोक	Dhulikhel	1396	Bethanchowk Gaunpalika	6
Bagmati	Lalitpur	ललितपुर	Lalitpur	385	Lalitpur Metropolitan City	29
Bagmati	Lalitpur	ललितपुर	Lalitpur	385	Godawari Municipality	14
Bagmati	Lalitpur	ललितपुर	Lalitpur	385	Mahalaxmi Municipality	10
Bagmati	Lalitpur	ललितपुर	Lalitpur	385	Bagmati Gaunpalika	7
Bagmati	Lalitpur	ललितपुर	Lalitpur	385	Mahankal Gaunpalika	6
Bagmati	Lalitpur	ललितपुर	Lalitpur	385	Konjyosom Gaunpalika	5
Bagmati	Makwanpur	मकवानपुर	Hetauda	2426	Hetauda Sub-Metropolitan City	19
Bagmati	Makwanpur	मकवानपुर	Hetauda	2426	Bakaiya Gaunpalika	12
Bagmati	Makwanpur	मकवानपुर	Hetauda	2426	Thaha Municipality	12
Bagmati	Makwanpur	मकवानपुर	Hetauda	2426	Kailash Gaunpalika	10
Bagmati	Makwanpur	मकवानपुर	Hetauda	2426	Bagmati Gaunpalika	9
Bagmati	Makwanpur	मकवानपुर	Hetauda	2426	Bhimphedi Gaunpalika	9
Bagmati	Makwanpur	मकवानपुर	Hetauda	2426	Manahari Gaunpalika	9
Bagmati	Makwanpur	मकवानपुर	Hetauda	2426	Raksirang Gaunpalika	9
Bagmati	Makwanpur	मकवानपुर	Hetauda	2426	Makawanpurgadhi Gaunpalika	8
Bagmati	Makwanpur	मकवानपुर	Hetauda	2426	Indrasarowar Gaunpalika	5
Bagmati	Nuwakot	नुवाकोट	Bidur	1121	Belkotgadhi Municipality	13
Bagmati	Nuwakot	नुवाकोट	Bidur	1121	Bidur Municipality	13
Bagmati	Nuwakot	नुवाकोट	Bidur	1121	Kakani Gaunpalika	8
Bagmati	Nuwakot	नुवाकोट	Bidur	1121	Shivapuri Gaunpalika	8
Bagmati	Nuwakot	नुवाकोट	Bidur	1121	Dupcheshwor Gaunpalika	7
Bagmati	Nuwakot	नुवाकोट	Bidur	1121	Likhu Gaunpalika	6
Bagmati	Nuwakot	नुवाकोट	Bidur	1121	Myagang Gaunpalika	6
Bagmati	Nuwakot	नुवाकोट	Bidur	1121	Tadi Gaunpalika	6
Bagmati	Nuwakot	नुवाकोट	Bidur	1121	Tarakeshwor Gaunpalika	6
Bagmati	Nuwakot	नुवाकोट	Bidur	1121	Kispang Gaunpalika	5
Bagmati	Nuwakot	नुवाकोट	Bidur	1121	Panchakanya Gaunpalika	5
Bagmati	Nuwakot	नुवाकोट	Bidur	1121	Suryagadhi Gaunpalika	5
Bagmati	Ramechhap	रामेछाप	Manthali	1546	Manthali Municipality	14
Bagmati	Ramechhap	रामेछाप	Manthali	1546	Khandadevi Gaunpalika	9
Bagmati	Ramechhap	रामेछाप	Manthali	1546	Ramechhap Municipality	9
Bagmati	Ramechhap	रामेछाप	Manthali	1546	Doramba Gaunpalika	7
Bagmati	Ramechhap	रामेछाप	Manthali	1546	Likhu Tamakoshi Gaunpalika	7
Bagmati	Ramechhap	रामेछाप	Manthali	1546	Umakunda Gaunpalika	7
Bagmati	Ramechhap	रामेछाप	Manthali	1546	Gokulganga Gaunpalika	6
Bagmati	Ramechhap	रामेछाप	Manthali	1546	Sunapati Gaunpalika	5
Bagmati	Rasuwa	रसुवा	Dhunche	1544	Gosaikunda Gaunpalika	6
Bagmati	Rasuwa	रसुवा	Dhunche	1544	Naukunda Gaunpalika	6
Bagmati	Rasuwa	रसुवा	Dhunche	1544	Aamachhodingmo Gaunpalika	5
Bagmati	Rasuwa	रसुवा	Dhunche	1544	Kalika Gaunpalika	5
Bagmati	Rasuwa	रसुवा	Dhunche	1544	Uttargaya Gaunpalika	5
Bagmati	Sindhuli	सिन्धुली	Kamalamai	2491	Dudhouli Municipality	14
Bagmati	Sindhuli	सिन्धुली	Kamalamai	2491	Kamalamai Municipality	14
Bagmati	Sindhuli	सिन्धुली	Kamalamai	2491	Tinpatan Gaunpalika	11
Bagmati	Sindhuli	सिन्धुली	Kamalamai	2491	Hariharpurgaghi Gaunpalika	8
Bagmati	Sindhuli	सिन्धुली	Kamalamai	2491	Golanjor Gaunpalika	7
Bagmati	Sindhuli	सिन्धुली	Kamalamai	2491	Marin Gaunpalika	7
Bagmati	Sindhuli	सिन्धुली	Kamalamai	2491	Sunkoshi Gaunpalika	7
Bagmati	Sindhuli	सिन्धुली	Kamalamai	2491	Phikkal Gaunpalika	6
Bagmati	Sindhuli	सिन्धुली	Kamalamai	2491	Ghyanglekha Gaunpalika	5
Bagmati	Sindhupalchok	सिन्धुपाल्चोक	Chautara	2542	Choutara Sangachowkgadhi Municipality	14
Bagmati	Sindhupalchok	सिन्धुपाल्चोक	Chautara	2542	Melanchi Municipality	13
Bagmati	Sindhupalchok	सिन्धुपाल्चोक	Chautara	2542	Indrawoti Gaunpalika	12
Bagmati	Sindhupalchok	सिन्धुपाल्चोक	Chautara	2542	Bahrabise Municipality	9
Bagmati	Sindhupalchok	सिन्धुपाल्चोक	Chautara	2542	Balephi Gaunpalika	8
Bagmati	Sindhupalchok	सिन्धुपाल्चोक	Chautara	2542	Panchpokhari Thangpal Gaunpalika	8
Bagmati	Sindhupalchok	सिन्धुपाल्चोक	Chautara	2542	Helambu Gaunpalika	7
Bagmati	Sindhupalchok	सिन्धुपाल्चोक	Chautara	2542	Jugal Gaunpalika	7
Bagmati	Sindhupalchok	सिन्धुपाल्चोक	Chautara	2542	Lisankhu Pakhar Gaunpalika	7
Bagmati	Sindhupalchok	सिन्धुपाल्चोक	Chautara	2542	Sunkoshi Gaunpalika	7
Bagmati	Sindhupalchok	सिन्धुपाल्चोक	Chautara	2542	Tripurasundari Gaunpalika	6
Bagmati	Sindhupalchok	सिन्धुपाल्चोक	Chautara	2542	Bhotekoshi Gaunpalika	5
Gandaki	Baglung	बागलुङ	Baglung	1784	Baglung Municipality	14
Gandaki	Baglung	बागलुङ	Baglung	1784	Galkot Municipality	11
Gandaki	Baglung	बागलुङ	Baglung	1784	Badigad Gaunpalika	10
Gandaki	Baglung	बागलुङ	Baglung	1784	Jaimuni Municipality	10
Gandaki	Baglung	बागलुङ	Baglung	1784	Dhorpatan Municipality	9
Gandaki	Baglung	बागलुङ	Baglung	1784	Kathekhola Gaunpalika	8
Gandaki	Baglung	बागलुङ	Baglung	1784	Nisikhola Gaunpalika	7
Gandaki	Baglung	बागलुङ	Baglung	1784	Tamankhola Gaunpalika	6
Gandaki	Baglung	बागलुङ	Baglung	1784	Bareng Gaunpalika	5
Gandaki	Baglung	बागलुङ	Baglung	1784	Tarakhola Gaunpalika	5
Gandaki	Gorkha	गोरखा	Gorkha	3610	Gorkha Municipality	14
Gandaki	Gorkha	गोरखा	Gorkha	3610	Aarughat Gaunpalika	10
Gandaki	Gorkha	गोरखा	Gorkha	3610	Palungtar Municipality	10
Gandaki	Gorkha	गोरखा	Gorkha	3610	Shahid Lakhan Gaunpalika	9
Gandaki	Gorkha	गोरखा	Gorkha	3610	Barpak Sulikot Gaunpalika	8
Gandaki	Gorkha	गोरखा	Gorkha	3610	Bhimsenthapa Gaunpalika	8
Gandaki	Gorkha	गोरखा	Gorkha	3610	Gandaki Gaunpalika	8
Gandaki	Gorkha	गोरखा	Gorkha	3610	Siranchowk Gaunpalika	8
Gandaki	Gorkha	गोरखा	Gorkha	3610	Chumanubri Gaunpalika	7
Gandaki	Gorkha	गोरखा	Gorkha	3610	Dharche Gaunpalika	7
Gandaki	Gorkha	गोरखा	Gorkha	3610	Ajirkot Gaunpalika	5
Gandaki	Kaski	कास्की	Pokhara	2017	Pokhara Metropolitan City	33
Gandaki	Kaski	कास्की	Pokhara	2017	Madi Gaunpalika	12
Gandaki	Kaski	कास्की	Pokhara	2017	Annapurna Gaunpalika	11
Gandaki	Kaski	कास्की	Pokhara	2017	Machhapuchchhre Gaunpalika	9
Gandaki	Kaski	कास्की	Pokhara	2017	Rupa Gaunpalika	7
Gandaki	Lamjung	लमजुङ	Besisahar	1692	Bensishahar Municipality	11
Gandaki	Lamjung	लमजुङ	Besisahar	1692	Sundarbazar Municipality	11
Gandaki	Lamjung	लमजुङ	Besisahar	1692	Madhya Nepal Municipality	10
Gandaki	Lamjung	लमजुङ	Besisahar	1692	Rainas Municipality	10
Gandaki	Lamjung	लमजुङ	Besisahar	1692	Dordi Gaunpalika	9
Gandaki	Lamjung	लमजुङ	Besisahar	1692	Kwhola Sothar Gaunpalika	9
Gandaki	Lamjung	लमजुङ	Besisahar	1692	Marshyangdi Gaunpalika	9
Gandaki	Lamjung	लमजुङ	Besisahar	1692	Dudhapokhari Gaunpalika	6
Gandaki	Manang	मनाङ	Chame	2246	Manang Ngisyang Gaunpalika	9
Gandaki	Manang	मनाङ	Chame	2246	Nason Gaunpalika	9
Gandaki	Manang	मनाङ	Chame	2246	Chame Gaunpalika	5
Gandaki	Manang	मनाङ	Chame	2246	Narpa Bhumi Gaunpalika	5
Gandaki	Mustang	मुस्ताङ	Jomsom	3573	Gharpajhong Gaunpalika	5
Gandaki	Mustang	मुस्ताङ	Jomsom	3573	Lo Ghekar Damodarkunda Gaunpalika	5
Gandaki	Mustang	मुस्ताङ	Jomsom	3573	Lomanthang Gaunpalika	5
Gandaki	Mustang	मुस्ताङ	Jomsom	3573	Thasang Gaunpalika	5
Gandaki	Mustang	मुस्ताङ	Jomsom	3573	Varagung Muktichhetra Gaunpalika	5
Gandaki	Myagdi	म्याग्दी	Beni	2297	Beni Municipality	10
Gandaki	Myagdi	म्याग्दी	Beni	2297	Annapurna Gaunpalika	8
Gandaki	Myagdi	म्याग्दी	Beni	2297	Raghuganga Gaunpalika	8
Gandaki	Myagdi	म्याग्दी	Beni	2297	Dhawalagiri Gaunpalika	7
Gandaki	Myagdi	म्याग्दी	Beni	2297	Malika Gaunpalika	7
Gandaki	Myagdi	म्याग्दी	Beni	2297	Mangala Gaunpalika	5
Gandaki	Nawalpur	नवलपुर	Kawasoti	1043.1	Gaidakot Municipality	18
Gandaki	Nawalpur	नवलपुर	Kawasoti	1043.1	Devchuli Municipality	17
Gandaki	Nawalpur	नवलपुर	Kawasoti	1043.1	Kawasoti Municipality	17
Gandaki	Nawalpur	नवलपुर	Kawasoti	1043.1	Madhya Bindu Municipality	15
Gandaki	Nawalpur	नवलपुर	Kawasoti	1043.1	Binayi Tribeni Gaunpalika	7
Gandaki	Nawalpur	नवलपुर	Kawasoti	1043.1	Baudikali Gaunpalika	6
Gandaki	Nawalpur	नवलपुर	Kawasoti	1043.1	Bulingtar Gaunpalika	6
Gandaki	Nawalpur	नवलपुर	Kawasoti	1043.1	Hupsekot Gaunpalika	6
Gandaki	Parbat	पर्वत	Kusma	494	Kushma Municipality	14
Gandaki	Parbat	पर्वत	Kusma	494	Phalebas Municipality	11
Gandaki	Parbat	पर्वत	Kusma	494	Jaljala Gaunpalika	9
Gandaki	Parbat	पर्वत	Kusma	494	Modi Gaunpalika	8
Gandaki	Parbat	पर्वत	Kusma	494	Paiyu Gaunpalika	7
Gandaki	Parbat	पर्वत	Kusma	494	Bihadi Gaunpalika	6
Gandaki	Parbat	पर्वत	Kusma	494	Mahashila Gaunpalika	6
Gandaki	Syangja	स्याङग्जा	Putalibazar	1164	Putalibazar Municipality	14
Gandaki	Syangja	स्याङग्जा	Putalibazar	1164	Walling Municipality	14
Gandaki	Syangja	स्याङग्जा	Putalibazar	1164	Galyang Municipality	11
Gandaki	Syangja	स्याङग्जा	Putalibazar	1164	Chapakot Municipality	10
Gandaki	Syangja	स्याङग्जा	Putalibazar	1164	Bhirkot Municipality	9
Gandaki	Syangja	स्याङग्जा	Putalibazar	1164	Biruwa Gaunpalika	8
Gandaki	Syangja	स्याङग्जा	Putalibazar	1164	Harinas Gaunpalika	7
Gandaki	Syangja	स्याङग्जा	Putalibazar	1164	Kaligandaki Gaunpalika	7
Gandaki	Syangja	स्याङग्जा	Putalibazar	1164	Aandhikhola Gaunpalika	6
Gandaki	Syangja	स्याङग्जा	Putalibazar	1164	Arjun Choupari Gaunpalika	6
Gandaki	Syangja	स्याङग्जा	Putalibazar	1164	Phedikhola Gaunpalika	5
Gandaki	Tanahu	तनहुँ	Damauli	1546	Byas Municipality	14
Gandaki	Tanahu	तनहुँ	Damauli	1546	Bhanu Municipality	13
Gandaki	Tanahu	तनहुँ	Damauli	1546	Shuklagandaki Municipality	12
Gandaki	Tanahu	तनहुँ	Damauli	1546	Bhimad Municipality	9
Gandaki	Tanahu	तनहुँ	Damauli	1546	Rhishing Gaunpalika	8
Gandaki	Tanahu	तनहुँ	Damauli	1546	Myagde Gaunpalika	7
Gandaki	Tanahu	तनहुँ	Damauli	1546	Aanbu Khaireni Gaunpalika	6
Gandaki	Tanahu	तनहुँ	Damauli	1546	Bandipur Gaunpalika	6
Gandaki	Tanahu	तनहुँ	Damauli	1546	Devghat Gaunpalika	5
Gandaki	Tanahu	तनहुँ	Damauli	1546	Ghiring Gaunpalika	5
Lumbini	Arghakhanchi	अर्घाखाँची	Sandhikharka	1193	Shitaganga Municipality	14
Lumbini	Arghakhanchi	अर्घाखाँची	Sandhikharka	1193	Sandhikharka Municipality	12
Lumbini	Arghakhanchi	अर्घाखाँची	Sandhikharka	1193	Bhumikasthan Municipality	10
Lumbini	Arghakhanchi	अर्घाखाँची	Sandhikharka	1193	Malarani Gaunpalika	9
Lumbini	Arghakhanchi	अर्घाखाँची	Sandhikharka	1193	Chhatradev Gaunpalika	8
Lumbini	Arghakhanchi	अर्घाखाँची	Sandhikharka	1193	Panini Gaunpalika	8
Lumbini	Banke	बाँके	Nepalganj	2337	Nepalganj Sub-Metropolitan City	23
Lumbini	Banke	बाँके	Nepalganj	2337	Kohalpur Municipality	15
Lumbini	Banke	बाँके	Nepalganj	2337	Rapti Sonari Gaunpalika	9
Lumbini	Banke	बाँके	Nepalganj	2337	Baijanath Gaunpalika	8
Lumbini	Banke	बाँके	Nepalganj	2337	Khajura Gaunpalika	8
Lumbini	Banke	बाँके	Nepalganj	2337	Duduwa Gaunpalika	6
Lumbini	Banke	बाँके	Nepalganj	2337	Janaki Gaunpalika	6
Lumbini	Banke	बाँके	Nepalganj	2337	Narainapur Gaunpalika	6
Lumbini	Bardiya	बर्दिया	Gulariya	2025	Gulariya Municipality	12
Lumbini	Bardiya	बर्दिया	Gulariya	2025	Barbardiya Municipality	11
Lumbini	Bardiya	बर्दिया	Gulariya	2025	Rajapur Municipality	10
Lumbini	Bardiya	बर्दिया	Gulariya	2025	Badhaiyatal Gaunpalika	9
Lumbini	Bardiya	बर्दिया	Gulariya	2025	Bansgadhi Municipality	9
Lumbini	Bardiya	बर्दिया	Gulariya	2025	Madhuwan Municipality	9
Lumbini	Bardiya	बर्दिया	Gulariya	2025	Thakurbaba Municipality	9
Lumbini	Bardiya	बर्दिया	Gulariya	2025	Geruwa Gaunpalika	6
Lumbini	Dang	दाङ	Ghorahi	2955	Ghorahi Sub-Metropolitan City	19
Lumbini	Dang	दाङ	Ghorahi	2955	Tulsipur Sub-Metropolitan City	19
Lumbini	Dang	दाङ	Ghorahi	2955	Lamahi Municipality	9
Lumbini	Dang	दाङ	Ghorahi	2955	Rapti Gaunpalika	9
Lumbini	Dang	दाङ	Ghorahi	2955	Bangalachuli Gaunpalika	8
Lumbini	Dang	दाङ	Ghorahi	2955	Gadhawa Gaunpalika	8
Lumbini	Dang	दाङ	Ghorahi	2955	Babai Gaunpalika	7
Lumbini	Dang	दाङ	Ghorahi	2955	Dangisharan Gaunpalika	7
Lumbini	Dang	दाङ	Ghorahi	2955	Rajpur Gaunpalika	7
Lumbini	Dang	दाङ	Ghorahi	2955	Shantinagar Gaunpalika	7
Lumbini	Gulmi	गुल्मी	Tamghas	1149	Resunga Municipality	14
Lumbini	Gulmi	गुल्मी	Tamghas	1149	Musikot Municipality	9
Lumbini	Gulmi	गुल्मी	Tamghas	1149	Chandrakot Gaunpalika	8
Lumbini	Gulmi	गुल्मी	Tamghas	1149	Malika Gaunpalika	8
Lumbini	Gulmi	गुल्मी	Tamghas	1149	Satyawoti Gaunpalika	8
Lumbini	Gulmi	गुल्मी	Tamghas	1149	Dhurkot Gaunpalika	7
Lumbini	Gulmi	गुल्मी	Tamghas	1149	Gulmi Durbar Gaunpalika	7
Lumbini	Gulmi	गुल्मी	Tamghas	1149	Kali Gandaki Gaunpalika	7
Lumbini	Gulmi	गुल्मी	Tamghas	1149	Madane Gaunpalika	7
Lumbini	Gulmi	गुल्मी	Tamghas	1149	Chhatrakot Gaunpalika	6
Lumbini	Gulmi	गुल्मी	Tamghas	1149	Isma Gaunpalika	6
Lumbini	Gulmi	गुल्मी	Tamghas	1149	Ruruchhetra Gaunpalika	6
Lumbini	Kapilbastu	कपिलवस्तु	Taulihawa	1738	Kapilbastu Municipality	12
Lumbini	Kapilbastu	कपिलवस्तु	Taulihawa	1738	Krishnanagar Municipality	12
Lumbini	Kapilbastu	कपिलवस्तु	Taulihawa	1738	Banganga Municipality	11
Lumbini	Kapilbastu	कपिलवस्तु	Taulihawa	1738	Maharajganj Municipality	11
Lumbini	Kapilbastu	कपिलवस्तु	Taulihawa	1738	Shivaraj Municipality	11
Lumbini	Kapilbastu	कपिलवस्तु	Taulihawa	1738	Buddhabhumi Municipality	10
Lumbini	Kapilbastu	कपिलवस्तु	Taulihawa	1738	Mayadevi Gaunpalika	8
Lumbini	Kapilbastu	कपिलवस्तु	Taulihawa	1738	Yasodhara Gaunpalika	8
Lumbini	Kapilbastu	कपिलवस्तु	Taulihawa	1738	Bijayanagar Gaunpalika	7
Lumbini	Kapilbastu	कपिलवस्तु	Taulihawa	1738	Shuddhodhan Gaunpalika	6
Lumbini	Palpa	पाल्पा	Tansen	1373	Tansen Municipality	14
Lumbini	Palpa	पाल्पा	Tansen	1373	Rampur Municipality	10
Lumbini	Palpa	पाल्पा	Tansen	1373	Baganaskali Gaunpalika	9
Lumbini	Palpa	पाल्पा	Tansen	1373	Mathagadhi Gaunpalika	8
Lumbini	Palpa	पाल्पा	Tansen	1373	Rainadevi Chhahara Gaunpalika	8
Lumbini	Palpa	पाल्पा	Tansen	1373	Ribdikot Gaunpalika	8
Lumbini	Palpa	पाल्पा	Tansen	1373	Nisdi Gaunpalika	7
Lumbini	Palpa	पाल्पा	Tansen	1373	Purbakhola Gaunpalika	6
Lumbini	Palpa	पाल्पा	Tansen	1373	Tinau Gaunpalika	6
Lumbini	Palpa	पाल्पा	Tansen	1373	Rambha Gaunpalika	5
Lumbini	Parasi	परासी	Ramgram	634.88	Ramgram Municipality	18
Lumbini	Parasi	परासी	Ramgram	634.88	Bardaghat Municipality	16
Lumbini	Parasi	परासी	Ramgram	634.88	Sunawal Municipality	13
Lumbini	Parasi	परासी	Ramgram	634.88	Pratapapur Gaunpalika	9
Lumbini	Parasi	परासी	Ramgram	634.88	Sarawal Gaunpalika	7
Lumbini	Parasi	परासी	Ramgram	634.88	Palhinandan Gaunpalika	6
Lumbini	Parasi	परासी	Ramgram	634.88	Susta Gaunpalika	5
Lumbini	Pyuthan	प्युठान	Pyuthan	1309	Pyuthan Municipality	10
Lumbini	Pyuthan	प्युठान	Pyuthan	1309	Sworgadwari Municipality	9
Lumbini	Pyuthan	प्युठान	Pyuthan	1309	Jhimaruk Gaunpalika	8
Lumbini	Pyuthan	प्युठान	Pyuthan	1309	Naubahini Gaunpalika	8
Lumbini	Pyuthan	प्युठान	Pyuthan	1309	Gaumukhi Gaunpalika	7
Lumbini	Pyuthan	प्युठान	Pyuthan	1309	Aairawati Gaunpalika	6
Lumbini	Pyuthan	प्युठान	Pyuthan	1309	Sarumarani Gaunpalika	6
Lumbini	Pyuthan	प्युठान	Pyuthan	1309	Mallarani Gaunpalika	5
Lumbini	Pyuthan	प्युठान	Pyuthan	1309	Mandavi Gaunpalika	5
Lumbini	Rolpa	रोल्पा	Liwang	1879	Rolpa Municipality	10
Lumbini	Rolpa	रोल्पा	Liwang	1879	Runtigadhi Gaunpalika	9
Lumbini	Rolpa	रोल्पा	Liwang	1879	Sunil Smriti Gaunpalika	8
Lumbini	Rolpa	रोल्पा	Liwang	1879	Gangadev Gaunpalika	7
Lumbini	Rolpa	रोल्पा	Liwang	1879	Lungri Gaunpalika	7
Lumbini	Rolpa	रोल्पा	Liwang	1879	Sunchhahari Gaunpalika	7
Lumbini	Rolpa	रोल्पा	Liwang	1879	Tribeni Gaunpalika	7
Lumbini	Rolpa	रोल्पा	Liwang	1879	Madi Gaunpalika	6
Lumbini	Rolpa	रोल्पा	Liwang	1879	Pariwartan Gaunpalika	6
Lumbini	Rolpa	रोल्पा	Liwang	1879	Thawang Gaunpalika	5
Lumbini	Rukum (East)	पूर्वी रूकुम	Rukumkot	1161.13	Putha Uttanganga Gaunpalika	14
Lumbini	Rukum (East)	पूर्वी रूकुम	Rukumkot	1161.13	Bhoome Gaunpalika	9
Lumbini	Rukum (East)	पूर्वी रूकुम	Rukumkot	1161.13	Sisne Gaunpalika	8
Lumbini	Rupandehi	रुपन्देही	Siddharthanagar	1360	Butwal Sub-Metropolitan City	19
Lumbini	Rupandehi	रुपन्देही	Siddharthanagar	1360	Tilottama Municipality	17
Lumbini	Rupandehi	रुपन्देही	Siddharthanagar	1360	Lumbini Sanskritik Municipality	13
Lumbini	Rupandehi	रुपन्देही	Siddharthanagar	1360	Siddharthanagar Municipality	13
Lumbini	Rupandehi	रुपन्देही	Siddharthanagar	1360	Devdaha Municipality	12
Lumbini	Rupandehi	रुपन्देही	Siddharthanagar	1360	Sainamaina Municipality	11
Lumbini	Rupandehi	रुपन्देही	Siddharthanagar	1360	Gaidahawa Gaunpalika	9
Lumbini	Rupandehi	रुपन्देही	Siddharthanagar	1360	Mayadevi Gaunpalika	8
Lumbini	Rupandehi	रुपन्देही	Siddharthanagar	1360	Kotahimai Gaunpalika	7
Lumbini	Rupandehi	रुपन्देही	Siddharthanagar	1360	Marchawari Gaunpalika	7
Lumbini	Rupandehi	रुपन्देही	Siddharthanagar	1360	Rohini Gaunpalika	7
Lumbini	Rupandehi	रुपन्देही	Siddharthanagar	1360	Sammarimai Gaunpalika	7
Lumbini	Rupandehi	रुपन्देही	Siddharthanagar	1360	Siyari Gaunpalika	7
Lumbini	Rupandehi	रुपन्देही	Siddharthanagar	1360	Suddhodhan Gaunpalika	7
Lumbini	Rupandehi	रुपन्देही	Siddharthanagar	1360	Om Satiya Gaunpalika	6
Lumbini	Rupandehi	रुपन्देही	Siddharthanagar	1360	Kanchan Gaunpalika	5
Karnali	Dailekh	दैलेख	Narayan	1502	Dullu Municipality	13
Karnali	Dailekh	दैलेख	Narayan	1502	Narayan Municipality	11
Karnali	Dailekh	दैलेख	Narayan	1502	Aathbis Municipality	9
Karnali	Dailekh	दैलेख	Narayan	1502	Chamunda Bindrasaini Municipality	9
Karnali	Dailekh	दैलेख	Narayan	1502	Gurans Gaunpalika	8
Karnali	Dailekh	दैलेख	Narayan	1502	Naumule Gaunpalika	8
Karnali	Dailekh	दैलेख	Narayan	1502	Bhagawatimai Gaunpalika	7
Karnali	Dailekh	दैलेख	Narayan	1502	Bhairabi Gaunpalika	7
Karnali	Dailekh	दैलेख	Narayan	1502	Dungeshwor Gaunpalika	6
Karnali	Dailekh	दैलेख	Narayan	1502	Mahabu Gaunpalika	6
Karnali	Dailekh	दैलेख	Narayan	1502	Thantikandh Gaunpalika	6
Karnali	Dolpa	डोल्पा	Dunai	7889	Thulibheri Municipality	11
Karnali	Dolpa	डोल्पा	Dunai	7889	Tripurasundari Municipality	11
Karnali	Dolpa	डोल्पा	Dunai	7889	Mudkechula Gaunpalika	9
Karnali	Dolpa	डोल्पा	Dunai	7889	Shey Phoksundo Gaunpalika	9
Karnali	Dolpa	डोल्पा	Dunai	7889	Kaike Gaunpalika	7
Karnali	Dolpa	डोल्पा	Dunai	7889	Chharka Tangsong Gaunpalika	6
Karnali	Dolpa	डोल्पा	Dunai	7889	Dolpo Buddha Gaunpalika	6
Karnali	Dolpa	डोल्पा	Dunai	7889	Jagadulla Gaunpalika	6
Karnali	Humla	हुम्ला	Simikot	5655	Sarkegad Gaunpalika	8
Karnali	Humla	हुम्ला	Simikot	5655	Simkot Gaunpalika	8
Karnali	Humla	हुम्ला	Simikot	5655	Adanchuli Gaunpalika	6
Karnali	Humla	हुम्ला	Simikot	5655	Chankheli Gaunpalika	6
Karnali	Humla	हुम्ला	Simikot	5655	Namkha Gaunpalika	6
Karnali	Humla	हुम्ला	Simikot	5655	Kharpunath Gaunpalika	5
Karnali	Humla	हुम्ला	Simikot	5655	Tanjakot Gaunpalika	5
Karnali	Jajarkot	जाजरकोट	Khalanga	2230	Bheri Malika Municipality	13
Karnali	Jajarkot	जाजरकोट	Khalanga	2230	Chhedagad Municipality	13
Karnali	Jajarkot	जाजरकोट	Khalanga	2230	Nalgad Municipality	13
Karnali	Jajarkot	जाजरकोट	Khalanga	2230	Junichande Gaunpalika	11
Karnali	Jajarkot	जाजरकोट	Khalanga	2230	Barekot Gaunpalika	9
Karnali	Jajarkot	जाजरकोट	Khalanga	2230	Kuse Gaunpalika	9
Karnali	Jajarkot	जाजरकोट	Khalanga	2230	Shivalaya Gaunpalika	9
Karnali	Jumla	जुम्ला	Chandannath	2531	Chandannath Municipality	10
Karnali	Jumla	जुम्ला	Chandannath	2531	Tila Gaunpalika	9
Karnali	Jumla	जुम्ला	Chandannath	2531	Kanaka Sundari Gaunpalika	8
Karnali	Jumla	जुम्ला	Chandannath	2531	Tatopani Gaunpalika	8
Karnali	Jumla	जुम्ला	Chandannath	2531	Hima Gaunpalika	7
Karnali	Jumla	जुम्ला	Chandannath	2531	Patarasi Gaunpalika	7
Karnali	Jumla	जुम्ला	Chandannath	2531	Sinja Gaunpalika	6
Karnali	Jumla	जुम्ला	Chandannath	2531	Guthichaur Gaunpalika	5
Karnali	Kalikot	कालिकोट	Manma	1741	Khandachakra Municipality	11
Karnali	Kalikot	कालिकोट	Manma	1741	Tilagupha Municipality	11
Karnali	Kalikot	कालिकोट	Manma	1741	Naraharinath Gaunpalika	9
Karnali	Kalikot	कालिकोट	Manma	1741	Pachal Jharana Gaunpalika	9
Karnali	Kalikot	कालिकोट	Manma	1741	Palata Gaunpalika	9
Karnali	Kalikot	कालिकोट	Manma	1741	Raskot Municipality	9
Karnali	Kalikot	कालिकोट	Manma	1741	Sanni Tribeni Gaunpalika	9
Karnali	Kalikot	कालिकोट	Manma	1741	Shuva Kalika Gaunpalika	8
Karnali	Kalikot	कालिकोट	Manma	1741	Mahawai Gaunpalika	7
Karnali	Mugu	मुगु	Gamgadhi	3535	Chhayanath Rara Municipality	14
Karnali	Mugu	मुगु	Gamgadhi	3535	Khatyad Gaunpalika	11
Karnali	Mugu	मुगु	Gamgadhi	3535	Soru Gaunpalika	11
Karnali	Mugu	मुगु	Gamgadhi	3535	Mugumakarmarog Gaunpalika	9
Karnali	Rukum (West)	पश्चिमी रूकुम	Musikot	1213.49	Aathabisakot Municipality	14
Karnali	Rukum (West)	पश्चिमी रूकुम	Musikot	1213.49	Chaurjahari Municipality	14
Karnali	Rukum (West)	पश्चिमी रूकुम	Musikot	1213.49	Musikot Municipality	14
Karnali	Rukum (West)	पश्चिमी रूकुम	Musikot	1213.49	Sanibheri Gaunpalika	11
Karnali	Rukum (West)	पश्चिमी रूकुम	Musikot	1213.49	Banphikot Gaunpalika	10
Karnali	Rukum (West)	पश्चिमी रूकुम	Musikot	1213.49	Tribeni Gaunpalika	10
Karnali	Salyan	सल्यान	Salyan	1462	Sharada Municipality	15
Karnali	Salyan	सल्यान	Salyan	1462	Bagachour Municipality	12
Karnali	Salyan	सल्यान	Salyan	1462	Banagad Kupinde Municipality	12
Karnali	Salyan	सल्यान	Salyan	1462	Chhatreshwori Gaunpalika	7
Karnali	Salyan	सल्यान	Salyan	1462	Kalimati Gaunpalika	7
Karnali	Salyan	सल्यान	Salyan	1462	Kumakh Gaunpalika	7
Karnali	Salyan	सल्यान	Salyan	1462	Darma Gaunpalika	6
Karnali	Salyan	सल्यान	Salyan	1462	Kapurkot Gaunpalika	6
Karnali	Salyan	सल्यान	Salyan	1462	Tribeni Gaunpalika	6
Karnali	Salyan	सल्यान	Salyan	1462	Siddha Kumakh Gaunpalika	5
Karnali	Surkhet	सुर्खेत	Birendranagar	2451	Birendranagar Municipality	16
Karnali	Surkhet	सुर्खेत	Birendranagar	2451	Gurbhakot Municipality	14
Karnali	Surkhet	सुर्खेत	Birendranagar	2451	Bheriganga Municipality	13
Karnali	Surkhet	सुर्खेत	Birendranagar	2451	Panchapuri Municipality	11
Karnali	Surkhet	सुर्खेत	Birendranagar	2451	Barahatal Gaunpalika	10
Karnali	Surkhet	सुर्खेत	Birendranagar	2451	Chaukune Gaunpalika	10
Karnali	Surkhet	सुर्खेत	Birendranagar	2451	Lekabeshi Municipality	10
Karnali	Surkhet	सुर्खेत	Birendranagar	2451	Simta Gaunpalika	9
Karnali	Surkhet	सुर्खेत	Birendranagar	2451	Chingad Gaunpalika	6
Sudurpaschim	Achham	अछाम	Mangalsen	1680	Mangalsen Municipality	14
Sudurpaschim	Achham	अछाम	Mangalsen	1680	Sanphebagar Municipality	14
Sudurpaschim	Achham	अछाम	Mangalsen	1680	Kamal bazar Municipality	10
Sudurpaschim	Achham	अछाम	Mangalsen	1680	Panchdebal Binayak Municipality	9
Sudurpaschim	Achham	अछाम	Mangalsen	1680	Dhakari Gaunpalika	8
Sudurpaschim	Achham	अछाम	Mangalsen	1680	Mellekh Gaunpalika	8
Sudurpaschim	Achham	अछाम	Mangalsen	1680	Turmakhand Gaunpalika	8
Sudurpaschim	Achham	अछाम	Mangalsen	1680	Chaurpati Gaunpalika	7
Sudurpaschim	Achham	अछाम	Mangalsen	1680	Ramaroshan Gaunpalika	7
Sudurpaschim	Achham	अछाम	Mangalsen	1680	Bannigadhi Jayagadh Gaunpalika	6
Sudurpaschim	Baitadi	बैतडी	Dasharathchand	1519	Dasharathchand Municipality	11
Sudurpaschim	Baitadi	बैतडी	Dasharathchand	1519	Patan Municipality	10
Sudurpaschim	Baitadi	बैतडी	Dasharathchand	1519	Puchaundi Municipality	10
Sudurpaschim	Baitadi	बैतडी	Dasharathchand	1519	Melauli Municipality	9
Sudurpaschim	Baitadi	बैतडी	Dasharathchand	1519	Sigas Gaunpalika	9
Sudurpaschim	Baitadi	बैतडी	Dasharathchand	1519	Dogada Kedar Gaunpalika	8
Sudurpaschim	Baitadi	बैतडी	Dasharathchand	1519	Surnaya Gaunpalika	8
Sudurpaschim	Baitadi	बैतडी	Dasharathchand	1519	Dilasaini Gaunpalika	7
Sudurpaschim	Baitadi	बैतडी	Dasharathchand	1519	Pancheshwor Gaunpalika	6
Sudurpaschim	Baitadi	बैतडी	Dasharathchand	1519	Shivanath Gaunpalika	6
Sudurpaschim	Bajhang	बझाङ	Jayaprithvi	3422	Bungal Municipality	11
Sudurpaschim	Bajhang	बझाङ	Jayaprithvi	3422	Jayaprithbi Municipality	11
Sudurpaschim	Bajhang	बझाङ	Jayaprithvi	3422	Bitthadchir Gaunpalika	9
Sudurpaschim	Bajhang	बझाङ	Jayaprithvi	3422	Kedarsyun Gaunpalika	9
Sudurpaschim	Bajhang	बझाङ	Jayaprithvi	3422	Thalara Gaunpalika	9
Sudurpaschim	Bajhang	बझाङ	Jayaprithvi	3422	Chhabis Pathibhara Gaunpalika	7
Sudurpaschim	Bajhang	बझाङ	Jayaprithvi	3422	Durgathali Gaunpalika	7
Sudurpaschim	Bajhang	बझाङ	Jayaprithvi	3422	Khaptad Chhanna Gaunpalika	7
Sudurpaschim	Bajhang	बझाङ	Jayaprithvi	3422	Masta Gaunpalika	7
Sudurpaschim	Bajhang	बझाङ	Jayaprithvi	3422	Talkot Gaunpalika	7
Sudurpaschim	Bajhang	बझाङ	Jayaprithvi	3422	Saipal Gaunpalika	5
Sudurpaschim	Bajhang	बझाङ	Jayaprithvi	3422	Surma Gaunpalika	5
Sudurpaschim	Bajura	बाजुरा	Martadi	2188	Budhiganga Municipality	10
Sudurpaschim	Bajura	बाजुरा	Martadi	2188	Budhinanda Municipality	10
Sudurpaschim	Bajura	बाजुरा	Martadi	2188	Badimalika Municipality	9
Sudurpaschim	Bajura	बाजुरा	Martadi	2188	Tribeni Municipality	9
Sudurpaschim	Bajura	बाजुरा	Martadi	2188	Himali Gaunpalika	7
Sudurpaschim	Bajura	बाजुरा	Martadi	2188	Khaptad Chhededaha Gaunpalika	7
Sudurpaschim	Bajura	बाजुरा	Martadi	2188	Gaumul Gaunpalika	6
Sudurpaschim	Bajura	बाजुरा	Martadi	2188	Jagannath Gaunpalika	6
Sudurpaschim	Bajura	बाजुरा	Martadi	2188	Swamikartik Khapar Gaunpalika	5
Sudurpaschim	Dadeldhura	डडेलधुरा	Amargadhi	1538	Parashuram Municipality	12
Sudurpaschim	Dadeldhura	डडेलधुरा	Amargadhi	1538	Amargadhi Municipality	11
Sudurpaschim	Dadeldhura	डडेलधुरा	Amargadhi	1538	Aalital Gaunpalika	8
Sudurpaschim	Dadeldhura	डडेलधुरा	Amargadhi	1538	Ajayameru Gaunpalika	6
Sudurpaschim	Dadeldhura	डडेलधुरा	Amargadhi	1538	Bhageshwor Gaunpalika	5
Sudurpaschim	Dadeldhura	डडेलधुरा	Amargadhi	1538	Ganyapdhura Gaunpalika	5
Sudurpaschim	Dadeldhura	डडेलधुरा	Amargadhi	1538	Nawadurga Gaunpalika	5
Sudurpaschim	Darchula	दार्चुला	Api	2322	Mahakali Municipality	9
Sudurpaschim	Darchula	दार्चुला	Api	2322	Shailyashikhar Municipality	9
Sudurpaschim	Darchula	दार्चुला	Api	2322	Malikarjun Gaunpalika	8
Sudurpaschim	Darchula	दार्चुला	Api	2322	Apihimal Gaunpalika	6
Sudurpaschim	Darchula	दार्चुला	Api	2322	Byas Gaunpalika	6
Sudurpaschim	Darchula	दार्चुला	Api	2322	Lekam Gaunpalika	6
Sudurpaschim	Darchula	दार्चुला	Api	2322	Marma Gaunpalika	6
Sudurpaschim	Darchula	दार्चुला	Api	2322	Naugad Gaunpalika	6
Sudurpaschim	Darchula	दार्चुला	Api	2322	Duhun Gaunpalika	5
Sudurpaschim	Doti	डोटी	Dipayal Silgadhi	2025	Shikhar Municipality	11
Sudurpaschim	Doti	डोटी	Dipayal Silgadhi	2025	Dipayal Silgadhi Municipality	9
Sudurpaschim	Doti	डोटी	Dipayal Silgadhi	2025	Aadarsha Gaunpalika	7
Sudurpaschim	Doti	डोटी	Dipayal Silgadhi	2025	Bogatan Phudsil Gaunpalika	7
Sudurpaschim	Doti	डोटी	Dipayal Silgadhi	2025	K.I. Singh Gaunpalika	7
Sudurpaschim	Doti	डोटी	Dipayal Silgadhi	2025	Purbichouki Gaunpalika	7
Sudurpaschim	Doti	डोटी	Dipayal Silgadhi	2025	Jorayal Gaunpalika	6
Sudurpaschim	Doti	डोटी	Dipayal Silgadhi	2025	Sayal Gaunpalika	6
Sudurpaschim	Doti	डोटी	Dipayal Silgadhi	2025	Badi Kedar Gaunpalika	5
Sudurpaschim	Kailali	कैलाली	Dhangadhi	3235	Dhangadhi Sub-Metropolitan City	19
Sudurpaschim	Kailali	कैलाली	Dhangadhi	3235	Ghodaghodi Municipality	12
Sudurpaschim	Kailali	कैलाली	Dhangadhi	3235	Godawari Municipality	12
Sudurpaschim	Kailali	कैलाली	Dhangadhi	3235	Gauriganga Municipality	11
Sudurpaschim	Kailali	कैलाली	Dhangadhi	3235	Lamki Chuha Municipality	10
Sudurpaschim	Kailali	कैलाली	Dhangadhi	3235	Bhajani Municipality	9
Sudurpaschim	Kailali	कैलाली	Dhangadhi	3235	Janaki Gaunpalika	9
Sudurpaschim	Kailali	कैलाली	Dhangadhi	3235	Kailari Gaunpalika	9
Sudurpaschim	Kailali	कैलाली	Dhangadhi	3235	Tikapur Municipality	9
Sudurpaschim	Kailali	कैलाली	Dhangadhi	3235	Joshipur Gaunpalika	7
Sudurpaschim	Kailali	कैलाली	Dhangadhi	3235	Mohanyal Gaunpalika	7
Sudurpaschim	Kailali	कैलाली	Dhangadhi	3235	Bardagoriya Gaunpalika	6
Sudurpaschim	Kailali	कैलाली	Dhangadhi	3235	Chure Gaunpalika	6
Sudurpaschim	Kanchanpur	कंचनपुर	Bhimdatta	1610	Bhimdatta Municipality	19
Sudurpaschim	Kanchanpur	कंचनपुर	Bhimdatta	1610	Shuklaphanta Municipality	12
Sudurpaschim	Kanchanpur	कंचनपुर	Bhimdatta	1610	Punarbas Municipality	11
Sudurpaschim	Kanchanpur	कंचनपुर	Bhimdatta	1610	Bedkot Municipality	10
Sudurpaschim	Kanchanpur	कंचनपुर	Bhimdatta	1610	Belouri Municipality	10
Sudurpaschim	Kanchanpur	कंचनपुर	Bhimdatta	1610	Mahakali Municipality	10
Sudurpaschim	Kanchanpur	कंचनपुर	Bhimdatta	1610	Krishnapur Municipality	9
Sudurpaschim	Kanchanpur	कंचनपुर	Bhimdatta	1610	Laljhadi Gaunpalika	6
Sudurpaschim	Kanchanpur	कंचनपुर	Bhimdatta	1610	Beldandi Gaunpalika	5

== See also ==
- List of gaunpalikas of Nepal
- List of cities in Nepal
