= Dhanusha 1 =

Parliamentary constituency in Nepal

- Parliamentary constituency
- Dhanusha 1 in Madhesh Province
- Province: Madhesh
- District: Dhanusha District
- Electorate: 126,003
- Major settlements: Dhanushadham; Sabaila; Mahendranagar; Bhathihan Bazar; Ganeshman Charanath

Current constituency
- Created: 1991
- Party: NCP
- Member of Parliament: Matrika Prasad Yadav
- Municipalities: Ganeshman Charnath Municipality; Dhanushadham Municipality; Sabaila Municipality; Mithila Bihari Municipality (part); Hansapur Municipality (part); Mithila Municipality (part); Chhirreshwarnath Municipality (part)

Dhanusha 1 is one of four parliamentary constituencies of Dhanusha District in Nepal. This constituency came into existence on the Constituency Delimitation Commission (CDC) report submitted on 31 August 2017.

== Incorporated areas ==
Dhanusha 1 incorporates Ganeshman Charnath Municipality, Dhanushadham Municipality, Sabaila Municipality, wards 1, 3, 4 and 5 of Mithila Bihari Municipality, wards 2, 3, 5, 7 and 8 of Hansapur Municipality, ward 4 of Mithila Municipality and wards 8 and 9 of Chhirreshwarnath Municipality

== Assembly segments ==
It encompasses the following Madhesh Provincial Assembly segment

- Dhanusha 1(A)
- Dhanusha 1(B)

== Members of Parliament ==
=== Parliament/Constituent Assembly ===
Election	Member	Party
1991	Shivadhari Yadav	Nepali Congress
1994	Ram Chandra Jha	CPN (Unified Marxist–Leninist)
1999	Smriti Narayan Chaudhary	Nepali Congress
2008	Ram Chandra Jha	CPN (Unified Marxist–Leninist)
2013	Dinesh Prasad Parsaila Yadav	Nepali Congress
2017	Matrika Prasad Yadav	CPN (Maoist Centre)
May 2018	Matrika Prasad Yadav	Nepal Communist Party
2022	Dipak Karki	People's Socialist Party, Nepal
2026	Matrika Prasad Yadav	Nepali Communist Party

=== Provincial Assembly ===
==== 1(A ====
Election	Member	Party
2017	Kishori Sah Kamal	CPN (Unified Marxist-Leninist)
May 2018	Kishori Sah Kamal	Nepal Communist Party
2022	Sanjay Kumar Mahato	Nepali Congress

==== 1(B) ====
Election	Member	Party
2017	Ram Chandra Mandal	CPN (Maoist Centre)
May 2018	Ram Chandra Mandal	Nepal Communist Party
2022	Ram Chandra Mandal	CPN (UML)

== Election results ==
=== Election in the 2020s ===
==== 2026 general election ====
Candidate	Party	Votes	%
Matrika Prasad Yadav	Nepali Communist Party	10,430	25.24
Ram Paltan Sah	Nepali Congress	9,502	22.99
Ramchandra Mandal	CPN (Unified Marxist–Leninist)	9,315	22.54
Dipak Karki	Janata Samjbadi Party, Nepal	4,145	10.03
Manoj Malla Thakuri	Rastriya Prajatantra Party	3,729	9.02
Brahmadev Mahto	Janamat Party	2,404	5.82
Mahesh Kumar Yadav	Ujyaalo Nepal Party	367	0.89
Raj Narayan Sah	Independent	320	0.77
Bihari Raya Amat	Nepal Communist Party (Maoist)	237	0.57
Kishori Sah Kamal	Rastriya Swatantra Party	0	0.00
Others		879	2.13
Total		41,328	100.00
Registered voters/turnout		126,038	–
Majority		928	
Nepali Communist Party gain			

Total Voters: 126,038 · Votes Cast: 78,463 (62.25%)

Votes cast for the Rastriya Swatantra Party (Bell symbol) were counted but not publicly disclosed after the party's candidate was disqualified prior to polling.

==== 2022 general election ====
Candidate	Party	Votes	%
Dipak Karki	People's Socialist Party, Nepal	27,431	37.53
Matrika Prasad Yadav	CPN (Maoist Centre)	21,483	29.39
Kishori Sah Kamal	Janamat Party	14,467	19.79
Manoj Malla Thakuri	Rastriya Prajatantra Party	8,273	11.32
Others		1,444	1.98
Total		73,098	100.00
Majority		5,948	
People's Socialist Party, Nepal gain			

==== 2022 Nepalese provincial elections ====
===== 1 (A) =====
Party	Candidate	Votes	%
Nepali Congress	Sanjay Kumar Mahato	10,955	29.07
Janata Samajbadi Party, Nepal	Sukeshwor Yadav	10,949	29.06
Janamat Party	Brahmadev Mahato	8,393	22.28
Rastriya Prajatantra Party	Parshu Ram Kumar	4,791	12.72
Independent	Umesh Chandra Yadav	288	0.76
Bahujan Shakti Party	Jagdish Yadav	79	0.21
Others		2,219	5.89
Valid votes		37,674	100
Invalid votes		2,585	6.42
Total votes cast		40,259	66.15
Registered voters		60,866	100
Turnout		66.15%	
Result	Nepali Congress gain		
Source: Dhanusa -1 Election Result

===== 1 (B) =====
Party	Candidate	Votes	%
CPN (UML)	Ram Chandra Mandal	13,575	36.32
Loktantrik Samajwadi Party	Sanjay Kumar Singh	10,397	27.81
Janamat Party	Surendra Kumar Mandal	9,053	24.22
Rastriya Prajatantra Party	Deep Narayan Yadav	2,519	6.74
Independent	Rameshwor Sahu Sudi	26	0.07
Independent	Shankar Kumar Pasman	23	0.06
Independent	Brahmadev Pandit	23	0.06
Independent	Shrawan Kumar Rai	21	0.06
Independent	Sunil Kumar Mandal	13	0.03
Independent	Laxman Mahato Koirala	12	0.03
Independent	Raj Kumar Adhikari Mandal	11	0.03
Others		1,706	4.56
Valid votes		37,379	100
Invalid votes		1,840	4.69
Total votes cast		39,219	67.50
Registered voters		58,104	100
Turnout		`67.50%	
Result	CPN (UML) gain		
Source: Dhanusa -1 Election Result

=== Election in the 2010s ===
==== 2017 legislative elections ====
Party	Candidate	Votes
CPN (Maoist Centre)	Matrika Prasad Yadav	26,418
Federal Socialist Forum, Nepal	Deepak Karki	17,296
Nepali Congress	Ananda Prasad Dhungana	15,679
Independent	Manoj Malla Thakuri	3,492
Others		1,812
Invalid votes		4,471
Result	Maoist Centre gain	
Source: Election Commission

==== 2017 Nepalese provincial elections ====
===== 1(A) =====
Party	Candidate	Votes
CPN (Unified Marxist–Leninist)	Kishori Sah Kamal	14,209
Federal Socialist Forum, Nepal	Shyam Narayan Yadav	8,911
Nepali Congress	Prem Kishore Prasad Sohteli	6,714
Independent	Jaya Kumar Yadav	1,857
Others		1,663
Invalid votes		2,013
Result	CPN (UML) gain	
Source: Election Commission

===== 1(B) =====
Party	Candidate	Votes
Communist Party of Nepal (Maoist Centre)	Ram Chandra Mandal	13,468
Rastriya Janata Party Nepal	Rita Yadav	9,865
Nepali Congress	Ram Udaya Yadav	7,628
Others		1,041
Invalid votes		1,706
Result	Maoist Centre gain	
Source: Election Commission

==== 2013 Constituent Assembly election ====
Party	Candidate	Votes
Nepali Congress	Dinesh Prasad Parsaila Yadav	8,827
Independent	Jog Kumar Barbariya Yadav	7,946
UCPN (Maoist)	Ram Chandra Jha	5,310
CPN (Unified Marxist–Leninist)	Ratneshwor Goit Yadav	4,175
Madhesi Jana Adhikar Forum, Nepal (Democratic)	Uma Shankar Argariya	3,137
Madhesi Jana Adhikar Forum, Nepal	Arun Singh Mandal Dhanuk	1,327
Others		4,085
Result	Congress gain	
Source: NepalNews

=== Election in the 2000s ===
==== 2008 Constituent Assembly election ====
Party	Candidate	Votes
CPN (Unified Marxist–Leninist)	Ram Chandra Jha	12,183
CPN (Maoist)	Jog Kumar Barbariya Yadav	9,608
Madhesi Jana Adhikar Forum, Nepal	Gajadhar Rohita Yadav	6,210
Nepali Congress	Smriti Narayan Chaudhary	5,354
Others		4,733
Invalid votes		2,932
Result	CPN (UML) gain	
Source: Election Commission

=== Election in the 1990s ===
==== 1999 legislative elections ====
Party	Candidate	Votes
Nepali Congress	Smriti Narayan Chaudhary	20,095
CPN (Unified Marxist–Leninist)	Ram Chandra Jha	18,352
CPN (Marxist–Leninist)	Ratneshwor Goit	7,228
Rastriya Prajatantra Party	Guru Sharan Rohita	1,035
Others		1,377
Invalid Votes		1,457
Result	Congress gain	
Source: Election Commission

==== 1994 legislative elections ====
Party	Candidate	Votes
CPN (Unified Marxist–Leninist)	Ram Chandra Jha	20,749
Nepali Congress	Shiva Dhari Yadav	14,317
Rastriya Prajatantra Party	Madan Giri	4,677
Nepal Sadbhawana Party	Pradip Goit	1,637
Samyukta Janamorcha Nepal	Asarphi Minbar	1,636
Others		647
Result	CPN (UML) gain	
Source: Election Commission

==== 1991 legislative elections ====
Party	Candidate	Votes
Nepali Congress	Shivadhari Yadav	16,616
CPN (Unified Marxist–Leninist)	Yogendra Shah	16,371
Result	Congress gain	

== See also ==
- List of parliamentary constituencies of Nepal
