= Shaivism in Mithila =

Shaivism tradition in Mithila

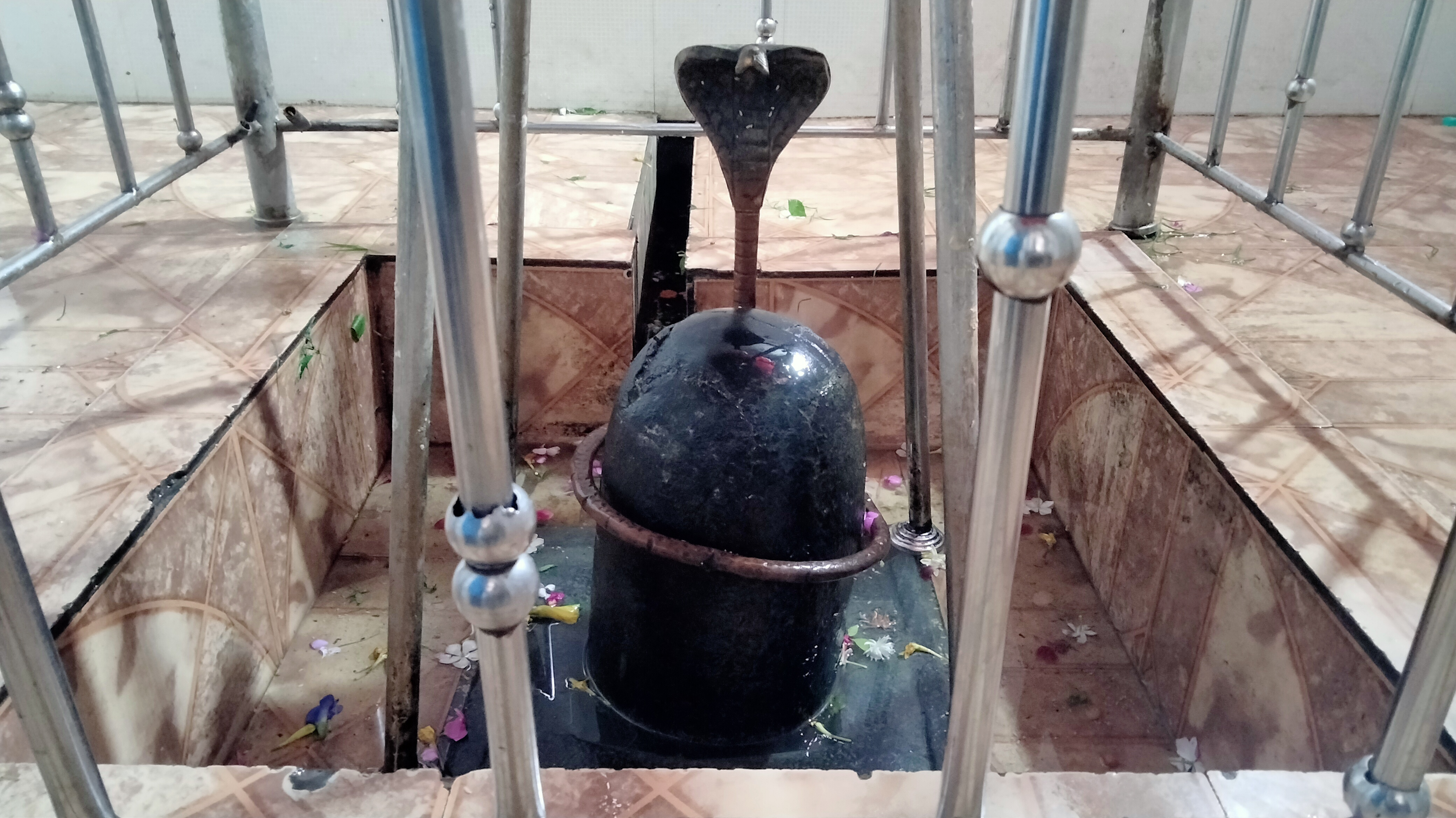
- View of a Shivalinga in the Manokamna Mandir in the region.
- Type: Sanatana Dharma
- Classification: Hinduism
- Region: Mithila
- Language: Sanskrit and Maithili
- Origin: Early period
- Slogan: ॐ नमः शिवाय।

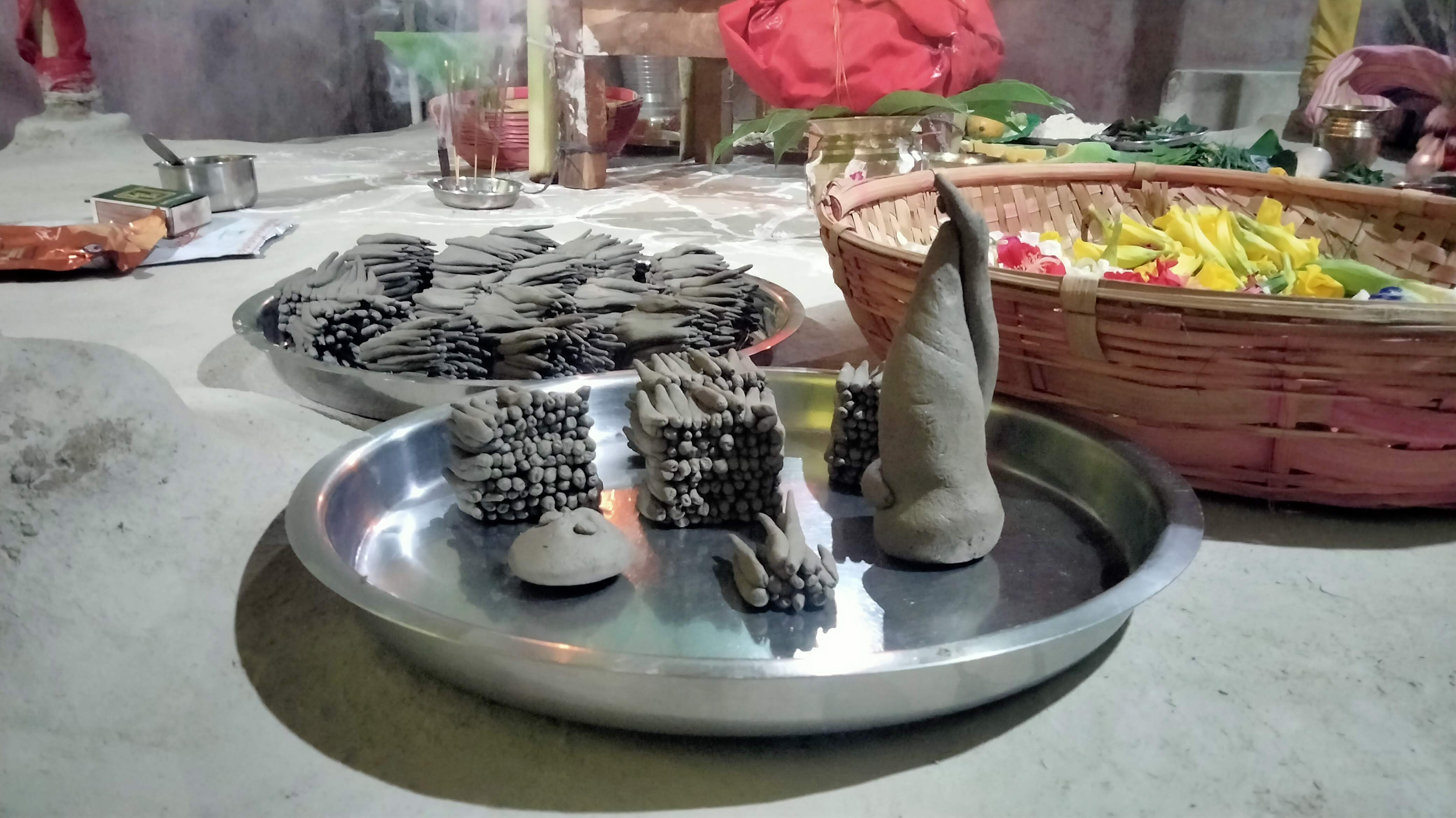
View of Parthiva Shivalingas made by a Maithil Brahmin in Basuki Bihari during Satyanarayana Puja at the Chaudhary Tol in the village.

The Shaivism in Mithila is one of the oldest and most deeply rooted religious traditions in the Mithila region of the Indian subcontinent. It is deeply rooted since the early period of the Mithila region. According to scholars, the Shaivism tradition in the region has played a vital role in shaping the cultural identity of Mithila. The deep influence of Shaivism on the folk life in Mithila still exists. The worship of clay-made Shivalingas known as Parthiva Shivalinga Puja is a unique tradition of worship that emerged in the region and is still in practice by the Maithils community. In the region of Mithila, each and every village has at least one Shiva temple within the village.

The devotions of Maithils community towards Shaivism can also be traced from the popular Maithili folk songs of Maheshvani and Nachari. These Maithili folk songs point out the great place of Lord Shiva in the hearts of the Maithil community in the region.

== History ==
The history of Shaivism tradition in Mithila can be traced from the ample of literary, numismatic, epigraphic and sculptural remains found in the region.

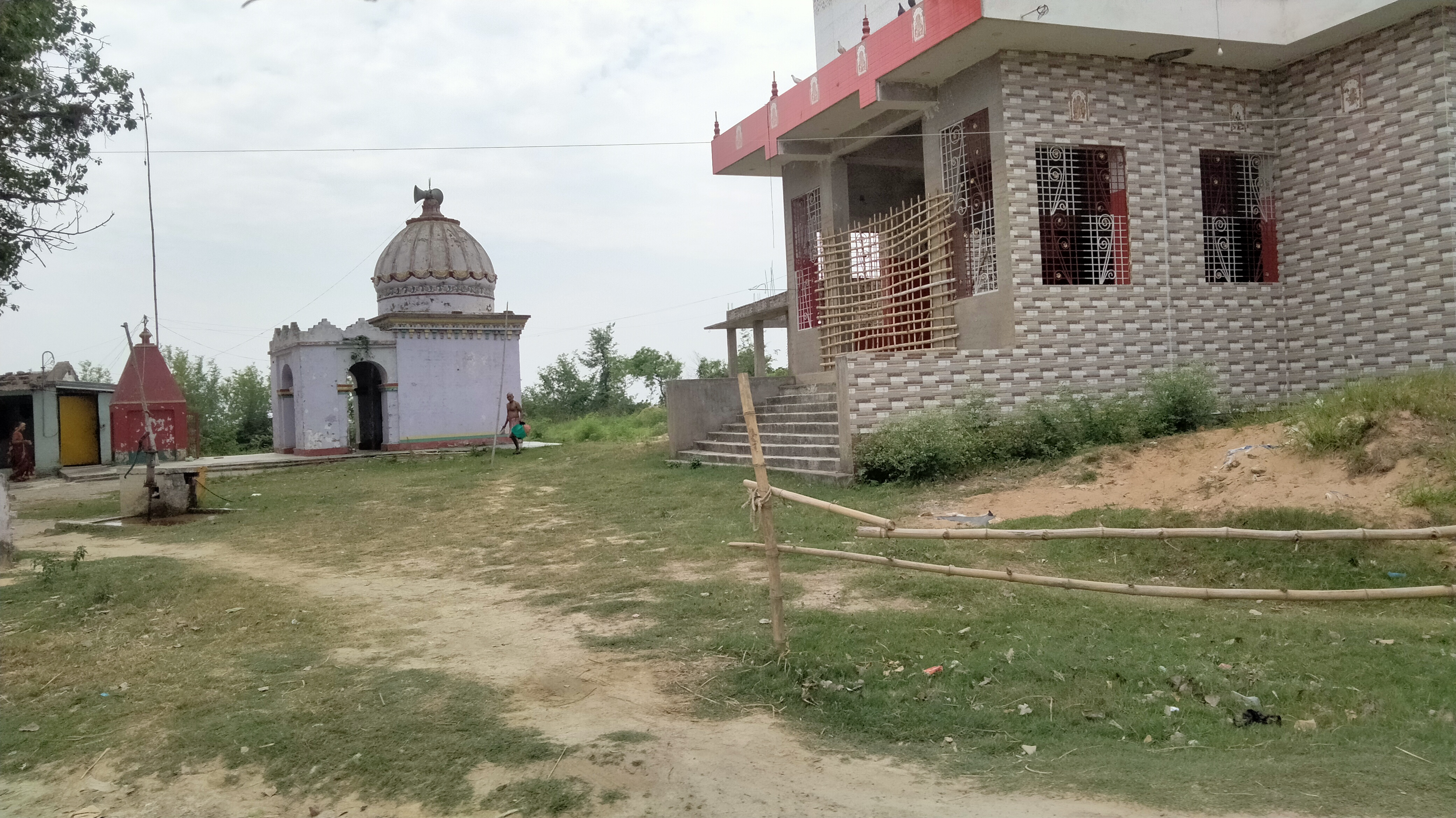
An ancient Shiva temple at Basbaria village near Saharghat. The temple is known as Basbaria Mahadev Mandir.

=== Ancient period of Epic and legends ===
During the period of Ramayana, the King Janaka of Mithila was a great devotee to Lord Shiva. According to legends, it is said that the King Janaka established several Shivalingas in the region of his kingdom during the Treta Yuga.

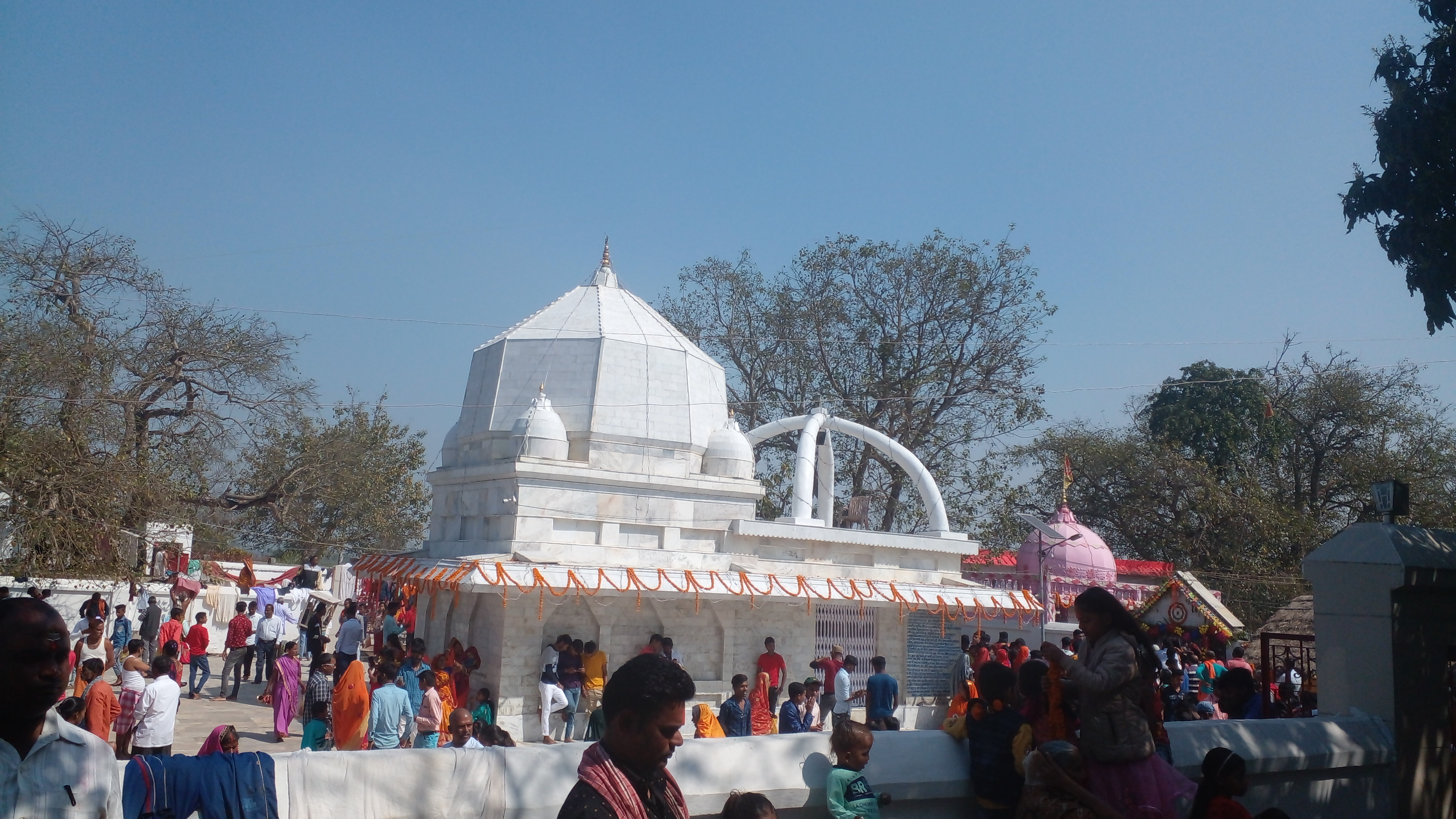
A legendary temple known as Kalyaneshwar Mahadev Mandir at Kalna village of Madhubani district. It is believed that, the Shivalinga of the temple was established by King Janaka in Mithila.

According to the legend of Kalyaneshwar Mahadev Mandir, it was established by the King Nimi of the Videha Kingdom. There is a legend that the King Nimi established a Shivalinga at the legendary site and performed a tapsya in the devotion of Lord Shiva there. It is believed that Lord Shiva appeared in the form of Kalyaneshwar Mahadev at site after the completion of the tapsya. The legend says that the original ancient temple around the Shivalinga was built by Lord Vishwakarma as wished by the King Nimi. The present structure of the temple was constructed about 200 years ago.

Similarly, his son King Mithi was also a very great devotee of Lord Shiva. There is a legend that he used to visit the sacred Kailash mountain daily, using his yogic power to see Lord Shiva. In the Uttra village, there is a legendary temple called Dakshineswar Nath Mahadev Mandir related to the legend of King Daksha Prajapati. The temple is believed to be established by him.

In the Sursand town of the Sitamarhi district, there is a legend that the ancient author Maharshi Valmiki performed a long tapasya at the legendary site Valmikeshwar Sthan near the outskirts of the town. He established a Shivalinga there later known as Valmikeshwar Nath Mahadev Shivalinga after his name. During the period of the Zamindar estate Sursand Raj, a temple was built by the queen of the estate at the site. The temple is known as Valmikeshwar Nath Mahadev Mandir.

=== Mediaeval period ===
During the mediaeval period in Mithila, the revered Maithili poet Vidyapati was a great devotee of Lord Shiva. Around the 14th century CE, he composed collections of the Maheshvani and Nachari songs or poems dedicated to Lord Shiva. In the collection of Maheshvani songs, he described the domestic and family life of Lord Shiva in his compositions. Similarly in the collection of Nachari songs, he praised Lord Shiva. Vidyapati also composed a Sanskrit text called Shaiva Sarvasvasara dedicated to Lord Shiva. In this text he codified the law of worship to Parthiva Shivalingas. It also describes the process of making the Parthiva Shivalingas, from bringing soil to making the earthly Shivalingas. In the text, all the laws related to the worship of Lord Shiva have been described in detail. It was composed on the orders of the then queen Vishwasdevi, the wife of Maharaja Padmasimha in the Oiniwar dynasty of Mithila.

According to the legends related to Vidyapati in the Mithila region, it is said that Lord Shiva was so impressed by the devotion of Vidyapati, he took incarnation in the form of human being as Ugna to serve the great devotee Vidyapati. The legend says that Ugna was the servant at the house of Vidyapati. The legacy of this legendary story is continued in the folklore of the Maithili culture and literature.

== Rituals and practices ==
The tradition of Shaivism in Mithila is practiced by several unique rituals and process. These include Parthiva Shivalinga Puja and Lakhram Puja, etc. The Parthiva Shivalinga Puja is the major ritual practiced for the worship of Lord Shiva in the region. Even nowadays, almost in every house of the region, the Parthiva Shivalinga Puja is performed with all the rules and regulations. In this ritual, the women of the family build a large number of earthly Shivalingas and then the men of the family worship these Parthiva Shivalingas chanting Vedic mantras and invoke the Lord Shiva. After doing invocation of Lord Shiva and worshiping the earthly Shivalingas, these are immersed in the soil.

Similarly, the Lakhram Puja is other major ritual and ceromany practiced in the region for performing worship to Lord Shiva. It is performed for the welfare of the people. In this puja, one and a quarter lakh Parthiva Shivlingas are made and then these are worshipped by a group of devotees in the village.

== See also ==
- List of Shiva temples built by King Janaka
- List of Shiva temples in Mithila
- Parthiva Shivalinga Puja
- Lakhram Puja
- Jalabhisheka
- Rudrabhisheka
