= List of Shiva temples built by King Janaka =

Shiva was the ishtadevta of King Janaka in the Mithila region. According to legend, it is believed that the King Janaka had established six temples of Lord Shiva in four directions of his kingdom.

== List of Shiva temples established by King Janaka ==
- Kalyaneshwar Mahadev Mandir: According to the text Ramcharitmanas of Tulsidas, King Janaka did penance here devoted to his ishtadevta Shiva. Shiva was pleased with the penance of the king and appeared in the form of Kalyaneshwar. Then Janaka established a lingam here in the devotion to Shiva and the god Viswakarma built the temple around the lingam. The temple is also considered as one of the gates of the ancient capital of Mithila.
- Jaleshwar Nath Mahadev Mandir: It is considered to be the second gateway of ancient Mithila Dham. Jaleshwar Nath Mahadev was also established by Janaka. It is said that Janaka had established a lingam at the four entrances of Mithila Dham, which is still present today.
- Haleshwar Sthan: It is one of the holiest Hindu temples dedicated to Shiva. According to myth, Janaka founded a temple of Shiva on the occasion of Putra Yeshti Yajna in Mithila Kingdom. The temple was named as Haleshwarnath Mandir.
- Kshireshwar Nath Mahadev Mandir was built at the third gateway of the capital of ancient Mithila kingdom. It is located at the Chhireshwarnath Municipality of the Madhesh Pradesh province in Nepal.
- Kapileshwar Nath Mahadev Mandir is believed to be a residence place of the Vedic sage Kapila in the capital city Janakpur of the ancient Mithila Kingdom. It is said that the King Janaka constructed a temple of Shiva there which later was called as Kapileshwar Nath Mahadev Mandir attributed to the sage Kapila.
- Satoshar Sthan: There is an ancient temple of Shiva known as Sapteshwar Nath Mahadev Mandir. It is one of the four lingam at the four corners of the ancient capital of Mithila. It is an important temple for the pilgrimage of the Mithila Madhya Parikrama. According to legend, this place was the Ashram of Saptrishi in Mithila.
