= Ramaidaiya Bhawadi =

रमदैया भवाडि Ramdaiya Bhawadi
- Village
- Interactive map of रमदैया भवाडि
- Coordinates: 26.82°N 85.96°E
- Country: Nepal
- Zone: Janakpur Zone
- District: Dhanusa District

Population (1991)
  - Total: 4,790
- Time zone: UTC+5:45 (Nepal Time)

Ramdaiya Bhawadi is a village in the Chhireswarnath Municipality of the Dhanusa District in the Janakpur Zone and central development Region of south-eastern Nepal. The former Village Development Committee was converted into a municipality, merging along with existing VDCs Ramdaiya, Sakhuwa Mahendranagar, Hariharpur and Digambarpur on 18 May 2014. At the time of the 1991 Nepal census it had a population of 4,790 persons living in 977 individual households.
