= Daak Vachan =

Collection of the sayings of Daak in Maithili literature

Daak Vachan in the Maithili literature refers to collection of the proverbs told by the Maithil scholar Daak in the Mithila region of the Indian subcontinent. It is a treasure trove of ancient aphorisms, agricultural wisdom, emotional feelings and astrological predictions prevalent in the regions of Mithila, Bengal and Assam. It is an ancient literary collection in the Maithili literature. The sayings of the Daak Vachan are still prevalent among Maithil community. It is considered informative for agriculture activities, weather predictions, character of people, and social behaviours, etc. The number of sayings and proverbs in the Daak Vachan is estimated to be one lakh.

In the region of Assam, the Daak Vachan is called as Dakor Boson. Its proverbs are followed by the people of the region for local building architecture and its construction.

== Etymology ==
Daak Vachan has two terms Daak and Vachan. According to the dictionary published by Kalyani Foundation in Darbhanga, the meaning of the word Daak is said to be an ancient astrologer whose words were very popular among the people in the region. Similarly the Indic term Vachan refers to words or sayings by a person or a prominent personality in society. Thus the literal meaning of Daak Vachan is words or sayings by the ancient astrologer Daak in the region. It is also defined as the proverbs attributed to the legendary scholar Daak (or Dak).

== Description ==
The Daak Vachan contains proverbs and poetic comments related to the food habits, drought, flood, planting of trees, buying bulls, and treatment prescriptions, etc. related to the soil and water of the region. Similarly, it gives information regarding auspicious time in house preparation related to Vastu, omens, Upanayana, Mundan, upbringing and education of children etc.

It describes the cause of murder, robbery, rape, theft etc. as the destruction of intelligence in human beings. There is a proverb regarding this as,

ई जुनि बूझब डाक निर्बुद्धि, नाशहि काल विनाशे बुद्धि ।

— Daak Vachan

In the region of Mithila, the proverbs of the Daak Vachan spontaneously emerge from the throats of the farmers, which are the need of that moments for agricultural aspects. It covers a wide range of daily aspects of the life. It covers several sanskar rituals, possession of properties, sneezing, meaning of crow crying, right time of starting travel and its right direction, and several worship rituals, fasting, etc. It provides guidelines for several aspects of the daily life. For beginning a new work, it says

गिरिजा गिरा गोविन्द गणेश, सकल काज सुमरि गिरिजेश ।

— Mangal Gaan, Daak Vachan

The passage of the Mangal Gaan says that the five 'ग' letters in the row indicate that there will be no hindrance in the beginning of the work.

On the matter of wealth possession, it says

धन में धान और धन गाय, किछु किछु सोना और सब छाय ।

— Daak Vachan

The proverb translates to "Rice from paddy, milk from cow and money from gold are sufficient for living."

The Daak Vachan provides guidelines on the direction for sneezing (chhink). On the matter of directions for sneezing, it says,

पूरब छींका मृत्यु हकार, अग्नि कोण में दुखद भार।

The above proverb for sneezing direction is translated as "Sneezing in the east direction invites to death, and that in the direction of Agni Kon (south-east) loads to sorrow."

In the matter of Mundan Sanskar, it says

चैत छारि शुभ वासर मानि, जन्म मास में कीजिए त्यागि ।

This proverb provides the guidelines to avoide some specific time period for conducting auspicious sanskar rituals of Mundan, etc.

== Origin ==
The original period of the Daak Vachan is disputed among scholars. Its origin period is considered to be before 14th century CE. According to the Maithili literature reviewer-litterateur Mohan Bhardwaj, the oral tradition of Maithili literature in the form of Daak Vachan was prevalent during the period from 9th to 12th century.

The literature of the Daak Vachan is more ancient that of the other Maithili text Varnaratnakara. According to scholars, the literature of the Daak Vachan is either contemporary or later to the literature of the Lorik Katha Geet in the Maithili literature of the region. It is one of the three major ancient literatures in the Maithili language. The literatures of Lorik Katha Geet, Daak Vachan and Varnaratnakara are considered as the major three ancient sources of the Maithili literature in the region.

== Legacy ==
The legacy of the Daak Vachan is still preserved orally among farmers and folk traditions in the region. Apart from the oral preservation, it has also been included in the curriculum of post graduation program at Maithili literature's department of several universities in the state of Bihar in India. It is taught in several universities of Bihar.

The eminent linguist George Abraham Grierson during the period of British India, in his book "Bihar Peasant Life" had several times mentioned the proverbs of the Daak Vachan used by the farmers in region for agricultural purposes. The proverbs of the Daak Vachan in the form of Daak, Ghagh, Dank, Bhadar, etc are also expressed in other several languages of the different parts across India. These proverbs have also been adopted in the languages of Bangla, Kanaujia Gorakhpuriya, and Rajputaniya of Rajasthan region, etc.

== Written literature ==
Since the several centuries, the proverbs and sayings of the Daak Vachan was propagated from one generation to next generations through oral folk traditions in the region. In recent centuries, several Maithili scholar in the region have tried to collect the proverbs and sayings of the Daak Vachan in written literature of the Maithili language.

The Maithil scholar Kapileshwar Jha wrote a book named Daak Vachanaamrit, having collection of the proverbs and sayings of the Daak Vachan. The book was published into two parts. Similarly Babu Raghubir Singh, a bookseller in Madhubani published a book named Dakvachan Sangraha on the Daak Vachan in three parts. The other Maithil scholar Jivananda Thakur, in this literary movement published a book named Maithili Daak. These books are the noteworthy literary works in the movement for the preservation of the sayings and proverbs of the Daak Vachan in the written form of the Maithili literature. In 1996, the Maithili scholar Dr Shashinath Jha published a literary work Daak Samhita at the Maithili research magazine Jigyasa.
