= Dāk =

Indian astronomer and soothsayer

Dak
- डाक
- Pronunciation: Dāk
- Born: Mithila region
- Monuments: Proverbs literature
- Other name: Daak
- Occupations: Soothsayer, astronomer, predictor and sayer of proverbs
- Notable work: Daak Vachan

Notes
- A popular sayer of proverbs

Dāk or Dak or Daak (Devanagari: डाक ) was a renowned ancient or medieval Indian scholar, astronomer or predictor, and sage-like figure. He is celebrated in the folklore or legends of the Eastern and the Northeastern India—particularly in Mithila (Bihar and Nepal), Bengal, Odisha and Assam—for his sayings regarding agriculture and the weather, which are known as Dak Vachan. There are several Indian texts or collections attributed to him. These are Dak Vachan and Dak Vachan Samhita in the Maithili literature, and Dak Tantra, Dakar Bachan, and Khanar Bachan, etc. in Bengali language. In some Bengali literature and legends, he is popularly described or imagined as a milkman and called as Dak Goala. In the Maithili literature of Dak Vachan, he is identified as soothsayer or predictor. The Dak Vachan text is also translated in Hindi language known Dak Vachan Sangrah. The sayings of Dak is also popularly regarded as the Vedas of mass communication in the Northern and eastern part of the Indian subcontinent.
