= Maheshvani =

Maithili folk songs devoted to Lord Shiva

"Maheshvani" (महेशवाणी)

Song by Vidyapati, Chanda Jha, etc.
- Language: Maithili
- Genre: Maithili folk songs of Lord Shiva's married and domestic life

The Maheshvani (Maithili: महेशवाणी) in the Mithila region of the Indian subcontinent refers to the Maithili folk songs dedicated to Lord Shiva. It is sung in praise of Lord Shiva and is addressed to Manain. The major Maithili poets who composed the songs of the Maheshvani were Vidyapati, Lalkavi, Kanharamdas, and Chanda Jha, etc. The songs of Maheshvani represent the life of Lord Shiva. These songs specially describes the marriage of Lord Shiva and Goddess Gauri and their married life. It also represent a form of bhakti kavya in the Maithili litrature. These songs are very popular in the region of Mithila and sung during different auspicious occasions in the region.

In the tradition of Shaivism and Shaktism in Mithila, the Maheshvani denotes the Maithili folk songs or poems that describe the domestic life of Lord Shiva and Goddess Gauri, including the marriage of the divine couple. It was developed and composed during the medieval period in the region of Mithila. It is one of the two major kinds of Shiva-songs. The other major kind of Shiva-songs is Nachari. The songs of Maheshvani are mainly sung in the early of the morning.

== Etymology ==
The word Maheshvani is combined form of the two Indic terms Mahesh and Vaani. The first term Mahesh is the name of Lord Shiva and the second term Vaani literally means speech. In the context of the songs type Maheshvani, the term Vaani does not refer to the speech of Lord Shiva but the speech of the songs in the honour of Lord Shiva. Thus the literal meaning of the Maheshvani is the speech of the songs in the honour or praise of Lord Shiva that describes his domestic life specially his marriage with Goddess Gauri, in the Mithila region.

== History ==
The renowned Maithili poet Vidyapati was a great devotee of Lord Shiva in Mithila during the 14th century CE. He composed several songs or poems devoted to Lord Shiva. These are divided into two kinds, Nachari and Maheshvani. The Nachari songs represent direct prayer to Lord Shiva, whereas the Maheshvani songs represent his life and specially his marriage to Goddess Gauri. The songs of the Maheshvani are frequently addressed to the mother Menaka of Gauri. In Maithili lokgeet, the mother Menaka is also called as Manain.
