= Lakhram Puja =

Tradition of Shivalinga Puja in Mithila

- लखराम पूजा
- Type: Parthiva Shivalinga Puja
- Classification: Hinduism
- Region: Indian subcontinent
- Origin: Mithila region
- Recognition: Sanatana Dharma
- Places of worship: Shiva temples
- Slogan: ॐ नमः शिवाय

Lakhram Puja (Maithili: लखराम पूजा) is a popular tradition of worshipping Parthiva Shivalingas by a group of devotees in the villages of the Mithila region in the Indian subcontinent. In the puja, a resolution is taken for one lakh Mahadeva Shivalingas. And one and a quarter lakh Shivlingas are worshipped. It is performed for the welfare of the people. According to Hindu adherents, it is believed that the Lakhram Puja as well as Rudrabhishekam destroy sins and bring welfare to the world.

== Beliefs ==
The Lakhram Puja is an ancient tradition of Hinduism in the Mithila region. It is performed for the welfare of the human beings. It is especially performed by villagers for wishing rain in the region. Whenever monsoon does not arrive on time in the region, the Lakhram Puja is held by the people or farmers for wishing the rain, so that the farms of the region be cultivated. In case of drought in the region, collective prayers are offered and God's blessings are sought. During the puja, prayers for rain are offered to Lord Shiva, Goddess Parvati, Devatas and Devis by the devotees. It also involves, singing group songs to please Lord Indra and other local deities of the region.

== Puja procedures and rituals ==
On the occasion of the Lakhram Puja, a group of ladies in the society makes one and quarter lakh Parthiva Shivalingas (Shivalingas prepared from wet mud). It is also made by Pandits, under the guidance of seven qualified Acharyas. During the making of the Shivalingas, some Vedic mantras are also chanted by Brahmins. The major mantra chanted during the rituals process of the Lakhram Puja is

ॐ नमः शिवाय

— Puranas

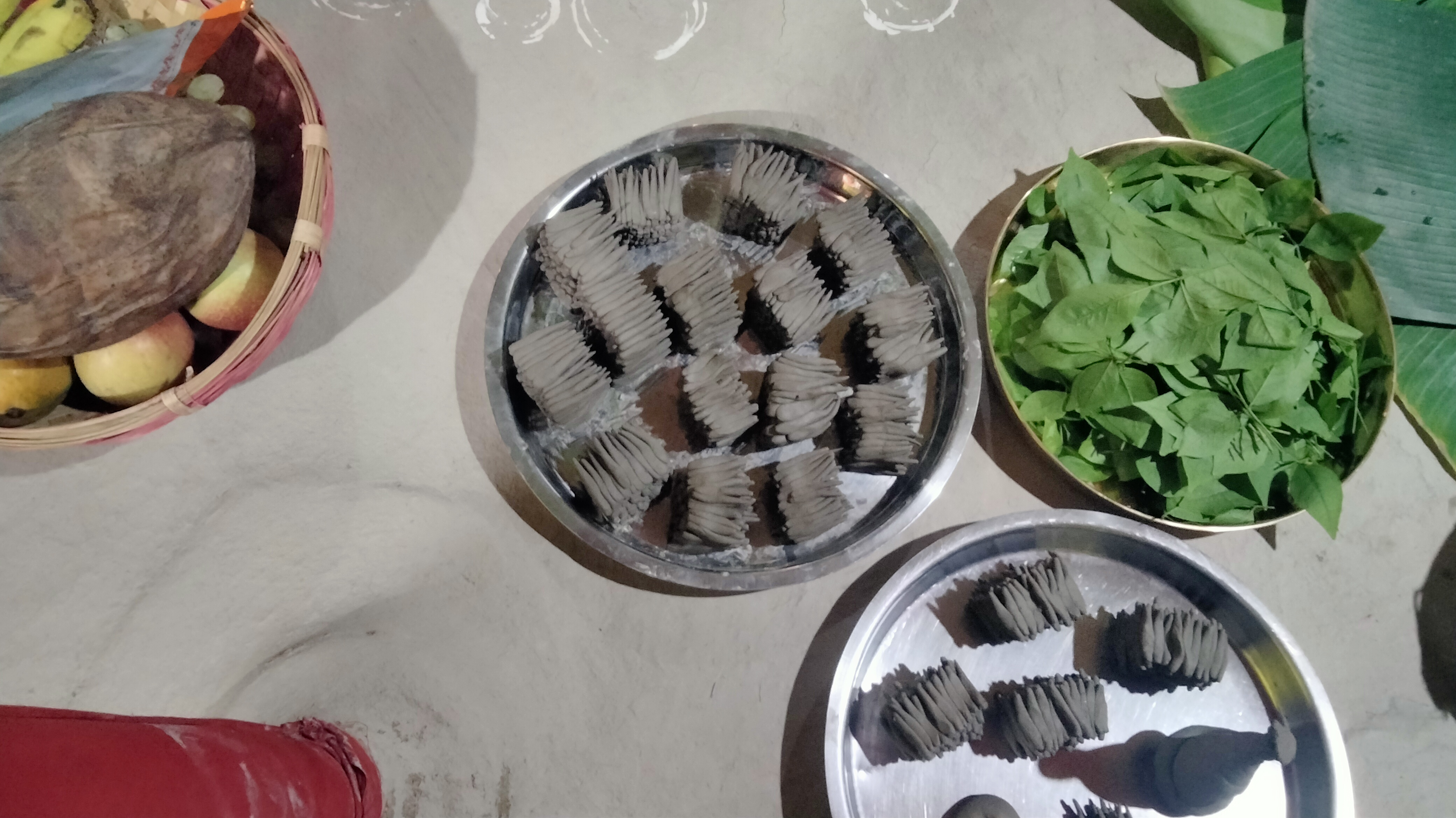
Sample of the Parthiva Shivalingas made by Maithils
