= Rudrabhisheka =

Rituals dedicated to Shiva

- रुद्राभिषेक
- Type: Rituals dedicated to Shiva
- Classification: Hinduism
- Region: Indian subcontinent
- Recognition: Sanatana Dharma

Rudrabhisheka (Sanskrit: रुद्राभिषेक) is a Vedic ritual dedicated to Shiva. During the Rudrabhisheka ritual, Gangajal (Achhinjal), honey, milk, water, Panchamrit and curd are offered to Shiva. It is generally offered on Monday to Shivalinga in a Shiva temple in the Indian subcontinent. According to Hindu adherents, it is believed that by performing Rudrabhisheka on this day, Shiva fulfills all the wishes quickly. It is performed under the guidance of a Brahmin. It is also performed on the occasion of the festival Mahashivratri dedicated to Shiva and Parvati. The importance of Rudrabhisheka is thought to be greater on the day of the Mahashivratri festival.

== Etymology ==
Rudrabhisheka is a Sanskrit word. It is the combination of two terms Rudra and Abhisheka. The term Rudra is directly related to Lord Shiva, who is also considered an incarnation of Rudra. Similarly, the term Abhisheka signifies to the offering and pouring holy liquid on Shivalinga. Thus, the combined term Rudrabhisheka means the consecration of Rudra, or Shiva.

== Rituals procedures ==
The Rudrabhisheka ritual is performed on a Shivalinga. It can be performed on a Shivalinga at a Shiva temple. The ritual of Rudrabhisheka is also be performed at home. Theplace where Shivalinga is to be installed, is cleaned and supposedly purified by sprinkling Gangajal or Achhinjal. The direction of the Shivalinga is in the north. The worshiper is in the east.

The performance of abhishekas with different religious liquids is done with the help of a shringi. First of all, Gangajal is poured in the shringi and Jalabhisheka is performed on the Shivalinga.
