= Kishori Sah Kamal =

Nepalese politician

- किशोरी साह कमल
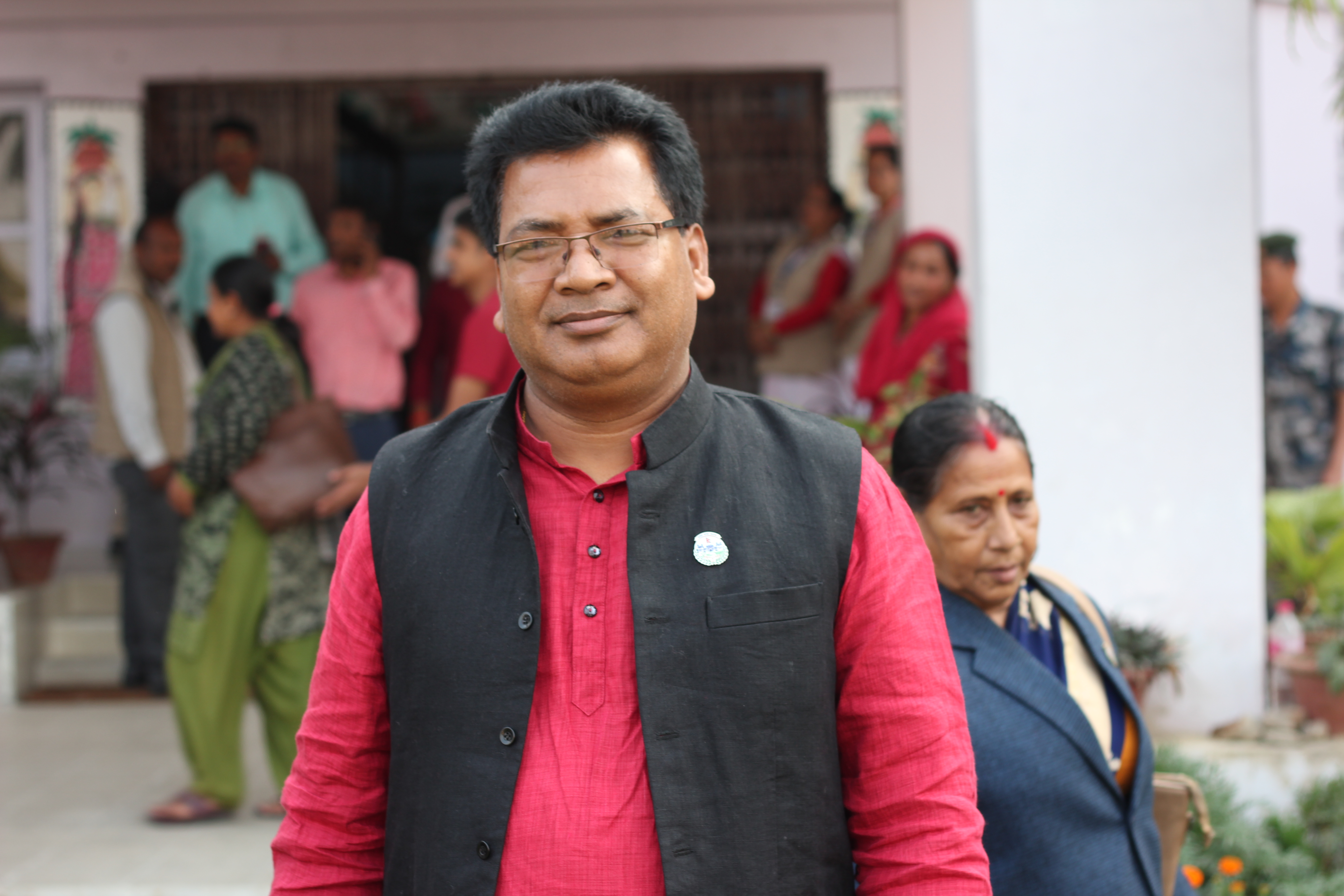
- Portrait of Kamal in 2019

Province Assembly Member of Madhesh Province
- Incumbent
- Assumed office 2017
- Preceded by: N/A
- Succeeded by: Sanjay Kumar Mahato
- Constituency: Proportional list

Personal details
- Party: Rastriya Swatantra Party
- Other political affiliations: CPN (Unified Marxist–Leninist) (till 2022)
- Occupation: Politician

Kishori Sah Kamal (Nepali: किशोरी साह कमल) is a Nepalese politician and a former member of the Provincial Assembly of Madhesh Province from the Rastriya Swatantra Party. Sah, a resident of Sabaila, Nepal, was elected in the 2017 provincial assembly election from Dhanusha 1(A).

== Electoral history ==
=== 2017 Nepalese provincial elections ===
Party	Candidate	Votes
CPN (Unified Marxist–Leninist)	Kishori Sah Kamal	14,209
Federal Socialist Forum, Nepal	Shyam Narayan Yadav	8,911
Nepali Congress	Prem Kishore Prasad Sohteli	6,714
Independent	Jaya Kumar Yadav	1,857
Others		1,663
Invalid votes		2,013
Result	CPN (UML) gain	
Source: Election Commission

== 2026 Dhanusha-1 election dispute ==
Kishori Sah's candidacy from Dhanusha-1 was scrapped by the Election Commission one day before the election after his name was found on the blacklist of the Credit Information Bureau of Nepal. He subsequently filed a writ petition at the Supreme Court challenging the decision. Although his candidacy had been invalidated, ballot papers bearing the Rastriya Swatantra Party's bell symbol had already been printed, and votes cast for the symbol were counted but not publicly disclosed by the Election Commission. Despite the Supreme Court initially directing the Election Commission not to publish the election results until a decision was reached, the Commission released the results following sit-in protests by the Nepali Communist Party, declaring Matrika Prasad Yadav the winner of Dhanusha-1. On 15 March 2026, the Supreme Court declined to issue an interim order on Sah’s writ petition, thereby allowing the Election Commission’s decision to stand and maintaining Yadav as the elected Member of Parliament from Dhanusha-1.
