= Sapteshwar Nath Mahadev Mandir =

Shiva temple in Mithila

- सप्तेश्वर नाथ महादेव मंदिर

Religion
- Affiliation: Hinduism
- District: Dhanusha district
- Province: Madhesh Pradesh
- Deity: Lord Shiva
- Festival: Mithila Madhya Parikrama

Location
- Location: Satoshar Sthan, Mithila region, Nepal
- Interactive map of Sapteshwar Nath Mahadev Mandir
- Coordinates: 26.7827711°N 86.0843946°E

Architecture
- Founder: King Janaka
- Established: Treta Yuga

Sapteshwar Nath Mahadev Mandir (Sanskrit: सप्तेश्वर नाथ महादेव मंदिर), also known as Mithileshwarnath Mahadev Mandir, is an ancient temple of Lord Shiva in the Mithila region of the Indian Subcontinent. It is located at Satoshar Sthan in the Dhanusha district of the Madhesh Pradesh province in the plains of the Terai region in the Himalayan nation of Nepal. This temple is one of the fifteen locations in the famous Mithila Madhya Parikrama.

== Description ==
Sapteshwar Nath Mahadev Mandir is located at the campus of the ancient Ashram of Saptarshi in the Mithila region of Nepal. According to legend, it is believed that the Satoshar Sthan in the Mithila region was once the ashram of the Saptarshi sages. During the pilgrimage of the famous Mithila Madhya Parikrama, the pilgrims reach and take rest here on the 11th day of the journey. According to legend, it is said that the King Janaka built four temples of Shiva on the four corners of the capital Janakpurdham in the ancient Mithila Kingdom . These temples are Kalyaneshwar Mahadev Mandir, Jaleshwar Mahadev Mandir, Kshireshwar Mahadev Mandir and Sapteshwar Nath Mahadev Mandir.
