= Nachari =

Devotional Maithili folk songs dedicated to Lord Shiva

Song
- Language: Maithili
- Genre: Devotional songs representing direct prayer to Lord Shiva
- Songwriter: Vidyapati

Nachari (Maithili: नचारी) refers to the devotional Maithili folk songs dedicated to Lord Shiva in the Mithila region of the Indian subcontinent. It is distinct from the songs of Maheshvani. The Nachari indicates songs representing direct prayer to Lord Shiva. The Maithili poet Vidyapati composed the collection of Nachari songs in his writings towards the devotion of Lord Shiva.

The Nachari songs are very popular among the Maithil community in the Mithila region. Due the popularity, its literature became an independent object in the Maithili literature. The tradition of singing 'Nachari' exists only in Mithila, and the Maithili poet Vidyapati is its originator.
