= Hariharpur, Dhanusha =

Coordinates: 26°52′N 85°59′E

Hariharpur, Nepal हरिहरपुर
- City
- Interactive map of Hariharpur, Nepal
- Country: Nepal
- Zone: Janakpur Zone
- District: Dhanusa District

Population (1991)
  - Total: 6,259
- Time zone: UTC+5:45 (Nepal Time)

Hariharpur is a town in Chhireswarnath Municipality in Dhanusa District in the Janakpur Zone of south-eastern Nepal. The formerly Village Development Committee was converted into a municipality, merging with Ramdaiya, Sakhuwa Mahendranagar, Hariharpur and Digambarpur on 18 May 2014. At the time of the 1991 Nepal census it had a population of 6,259 persons residing in 1133 individual households.
