= Sanjay Kumar Mahato =

Nepalese politician in the Nepali Congress

Honourable Sanjay Kumar Mahato
- संजयकुमार महतो

Province Assembly Member of Madhesh Province
- Incumbent
- Assumed office 2022
- Preceded by: Kishori Sah Kamal
- Constituency: Dhanusha 1(A)

Personal details
- Party: Nepali Congress
- Occupation: Politician

Sanjay Kumar Mahato (Nepali: संजयकुमार महतो) is a Nepalese politician belonging to the Nepali Congress. He is a member of Provincial Assembly of Madhesh Province. Mahato was elected via 2022 Nepalese provincial elections from Dhanusha 1(A).

== Electoral history ==
=== 2022 Madhesh Provincial Assembly election ===
Dhanusha 1(A)
Party	Candidate	Votes
Nepali Congress	Sanjay Kumar Mahato	10,955
People's Socialist Party Nepal	Sukeshwar Yadav	10,949
Janamat Party	Barhamdev Mahato	8,393
Result	Congress gain	
Source: Election Commission
