= Pavitra Mantra =

Purification Mantra in Hinduism

- पवित्र मंत्र

Information
- Religion: Hinduism
- Language: Sanskrit
- Verses: Verse 5.80.12 of Padma Purana
- A Vedic Mantra in Hinduism for Purification

Pavitra Mantra (Sanskrit: पवित्र मंत्र) is a Sanskrit Mantra chanted during Puja for purification in the tradition of Hinduism. It is also called as Snaana Mantra or Shuddhi Mantra.

== Method for practice of the mantra ==
During the utterance of the mantra for self purification, some holy water (Achhinjal) is taken in the left hand covering it with the right hand and after chanting the mantra, the holy water is sprinkled on the head and the body. Similarly before starting a Puja, the holy water is consecrated by splashing it on oneself and on the worship materials.
