= Sabaila, Nepal =

Sabaila सबैला
- Municipality
- Nickname: Sabela
- Location in Nepal
- Coordinates: 26.81°N 86.09°E
- Country: Nepal
- Province: Madhesh
- District: Dhanusha
- Established: 20sq2 km

Government
  - Mayor: Kari Ram Yadav (MC)
  - Deputy Mayor: Rahima Khatun (MC)

Population (2014)
  - Total: 24,893
- Time zone: UTC+5:45 (Nepal Time)
- Website: www.sabailamun.gov.np

Sabaila, sometimes spelled Sabela, is a municipality in Dhanusa District in Province No. 2 of south-eastern Nepal. At the time of the 1991 Nepal census, it had a population of 6,860 persons living in 1,246 individual households. Sabaila is one of the strongest municipalities in the Dhanusha district.

There is one Area Police Station in Sabaila, which is located in Sabaila Ward No-03. There is a central marketplace that serves 20 nearby villages. There is one popular temple, "Durga Mandir" where "Dashain- one of the greatest Hindu festivals", is celebrated grandly. Many residents of the region are educated and hold technical qualification like overseer and engineer. Few of them are working as engineer in abroad.As well as professionals such as CA, Doctor, MBA, Doctorate (Ph.D.). Its population is approximately 46,000. There is a mosque situated near the local area police station. The transport system of Sabaila is connected with Janakpur and Kathmandu and is linked with the Mahendra Rajmarg i.e. East-West highway.

== Education ==
There are 5 government schools, which go up to 10th grade. One of them is Saraswati Secondary School which runs a diploma in computer engineering affiliated with CTEVT as well as +2 in Hotel Management, Education and Management too. There are private schools too. Among them, Adarsh Vidhya Mandir English Boarding School and Sunrise English Boarding School are the oldest private schools.Royal English Boarding School goes up to 8th grade. Some newly established schools are Ganodaya Bal Batika School and Shree Jay Maa Durge English Boarding School. All these private schools are located in Sabaila.

There is a Primary Health Center located in Sabaila which serves around 18 villages of Sabaila municipality.Sabaila is also a town of ponds. There are 8 ponds only in Sabaila and others are located in Sabaila municipality. Some of the famous ponds are Satoshar and Kathmahal Pokhari. Some of the major temples are Durga Mandir, Krishna Mandir, Hanuman Mandir of Sabaila, Satoshar-Dham Mandir of Satoshar, Radha Krishna Mandir of Gobindpur, Hanuman temple of Thilla, Vishnu temple of Bhathihan, Hanuman temple of Raghunathpur, Salhesh temple of Kothiya, etc.

Thankyou all
