= Chanda Jha =

Author of the first Maithili Bhasha Ramayana

Kavishwar Chanda Jha
- Born: Chandra Nath Jha; 20 January 1831; Pindaruckh village, Darbhanga district, Mithila region
- Died: 14 December 1907 (aged 76)
- Education: Darbhanga Raj
- Occupations: Poet, author, researcher
- Writing career
- Pen name: Kavivar
- Language: Maithili
- Genre: Author of Maithili Ramayana
- Notable work: Maithili Bhasha Ramayana

Chanda Jha also known as Kavi Chandra was the first poet to write Ramayana in Maithili language. The Maithili version of Ramayana written by him is known as Maithili Bhasha Ramayana.

== Early life ==
He was born at Pindaruckh village of Darbhanga district in the Mithila region of Bihar, India on 20 January 1831. In his childhood he went to his maternal village Baragama at maternal grandfather Pandit Girivera Narayan Jha. There he studied in traditional manner and become well versed in grammar and literature. Similarly in his earlier time, he became poetic genius. After that he went to Gandhavari village at the home of Vasudeva Singh a step brother of Maheshwar Singh of Darbhanga Raj. There he studied for nearly five years under the patron of Vasudeva Singh.

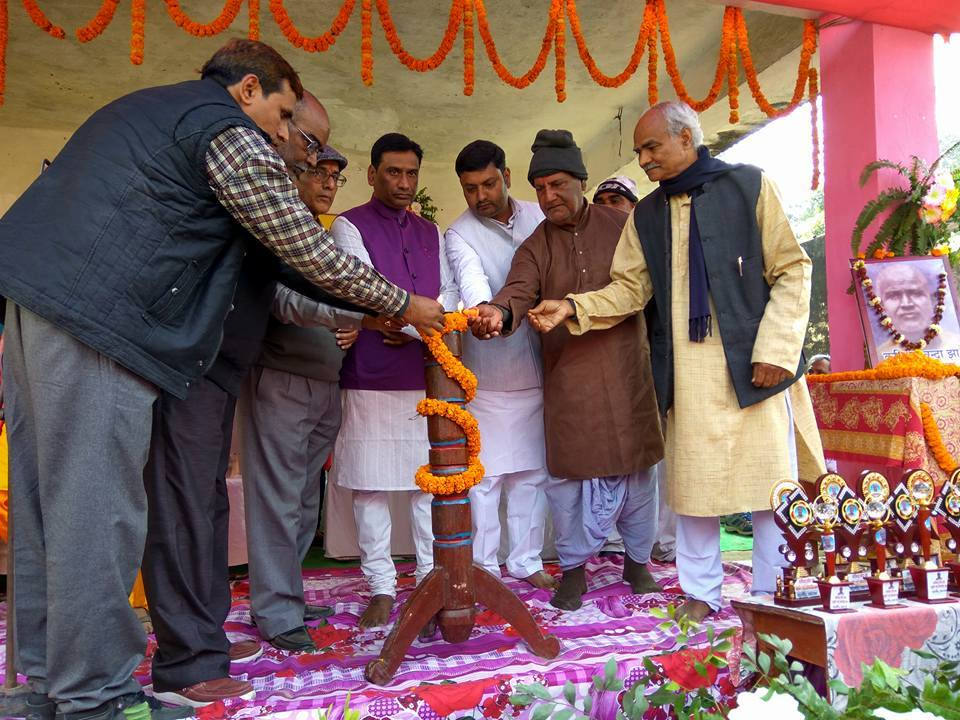
Villagers of Bargaon celebrating the birth anniversary of Chanda Jha in year 2017.

== Influence ==
He was a scholar of Sanskrit, Maithili and Hindi. His compilation, revision and encouragement remains relevant in many ways. He became popular for his text Maithili Bhasha Ramayana. Six years ago the speakers at a memorial day celebration organised by Kavivar Chanda Jha Vichar Sah Seva Sansthan, expressed the idea of naming streets, buildings, institutes, hospitals, libraries, railway stations, roads with his name along with his statue. Similarly every year on Maghi Saptami, Chanda Jha memorial function is held by the Chanda Jha Memorial Conservation Committee at Chanda Jha Smarak Sthal in Andhrathadhi. The function starts with wreath laying ceremony on the statue of the poet Chanda Jha. In the function, the works and personality of the poet is discussed among audience there. It is said that after the poet Vidyapati, Chanda Jha has been the brightest star in the sky of Maithili literature. He immortalized Mithila, Maithili and Maithili literature in the world with his outstanding work.

== Works ==
He wrote many texts for the preservation and promotion of Maithili. He published 19 books. His major works are Maithili Bhasha Ramayana, Ahilya Charitra, Ras Kaumudi, Vidyapati Pad Sankalan, Chhandograntha, Rajavali, Geet Saptashati, Maheshvani and Geet Sudha, etc. He did many researches and creative works in areas of literature. He was appointed as the head of literature department at Darbhanga Raj.
