= Mandapa Rishi =

Hindu sage

Rishi Mandapa

Personal life
- Parent: Kushmanda (father)
- Era: Kali Yuga
- Region: Indian subcontinent
- Known for: Founder of Parthiva Shivalinga Puja in Kali Yuga

Religious life
- Religion: Hinduism
- Sect: Shaivism

Mandapa Rishi (Sanskrit: मण्डप ऋषि) was a Hindu sage. He was a notable devotee of Shiva. According to legend, it is said that Mandapa was the first devotee in the Kali Yuga who started Parthiva Shivalinga Puja. He is considered to be the founder of the popular tradition Parthiva Shivlinga Puja in the Kali Yuga. He was the son of the sage Kushmanda.

== Early life ==
According to legend, Mandapa in his childhood used to make Shivalinga of sand on his palm and worship and anoint it throughout the month of Sawan. It is said that Shiva was very pleased with the devotion of the child Mandapa towards him. Then Shiva asked him for a boon. In response, the child Mandapa without getting distracted, asked for devotion towards Shiva and Parvati instead of asking for wealth and property.
