= Digambarpur =

Digambarpur दिगम्बरपुर
- Location in Nepal
- Coordinates: 26.87°N 86.00°E
- Country: Nepal
- Zone: Janakpur Zone
- District: Dhanusa District

Population (1991)
  - Total: 7,115
- Time zone: UTC+5:45 (Nepal Time)

Ichhapur is a town in Chhireswornath Municipality in Dhanusa District in the Janakpur Zone of south-eastern Nepal. The formerly Village Development Committee was converted into municipality merging along with existing VDCs Ramdaiya, Sakhuwa Mahendranagar, Hariharpur and Digambarpurin 18 May 2014. At the time of the 1991 Nepal census it had a population of 7,115 persons living in 1352 individual households.
