= Lorik Katha Geet =

Love story in Maithili literature

Lorik Katha Geet in the literature of Maithili language refers to the ancient Maithili folk songs or poems that describes the love story between the brave legendary ruler Lorik of the Bundelkhand region and a girl named Chandni of the Mithila region in the Indian subcontinent. It is also known as Lorikee. It is one of the major ancient literature in the Maithili language. The literature of the Lorik Katha Geet propagated in the region through oral folklore traditions. Some scholars believe that the literature of the Lorik Katha Geet is either contemporary or earlier to the literature of the Daak Vachan in the region. In ancient times, it was often sung during the performance of the folk dance called as Lorik Naach played in the region.
