= Hansapur, Dhanusa =

Hansapur हंसपुर
- Municipality
- Municipality in Nepal
- Location in Nepal
- Coordinates: 26.95°N 86.88°E
- Country: Nepal
- Development Region: Central
- District: Dhanusa
- Province: Madhesh
- Established: 2016 A.D. (2073 B.S.)

Government
  - Mayor: Pradip Kumar Yadav (NC)
  - Deputy Mayor: Durga Devi (NC)

Area
  - Total: 48.71 km^{2} (18.81 sq mi)

Population (2011)
  - Total: 39,145
  - Density: 803.6/km^{2} (2,081/sq mi)
  - Religions: Hindu Muslim Christian

Languages
  - Local: Maithili, Tharu, Nepali
- Time zone: UTC+5:45 (NST)
- Postal Code: 45600
- Area code: 041
- Website: www.hansapurmun.gov.np

Hansapur (Nepali: हंसपुर) is a municipality in Danusha District in Madhesh Province of Nepal. It was formed in 2016 occupying current 9 sections (wards) from previous 9 VDCs. It occupies an area of 48.71 km^{2} with a total population of 39,145.
