= Bhathihan Bazar =

Village in Nepal

Bhathihan Bazar भठिहन बजार Bhathihan Chowk
- Developing town
- Bhathihan Bazar
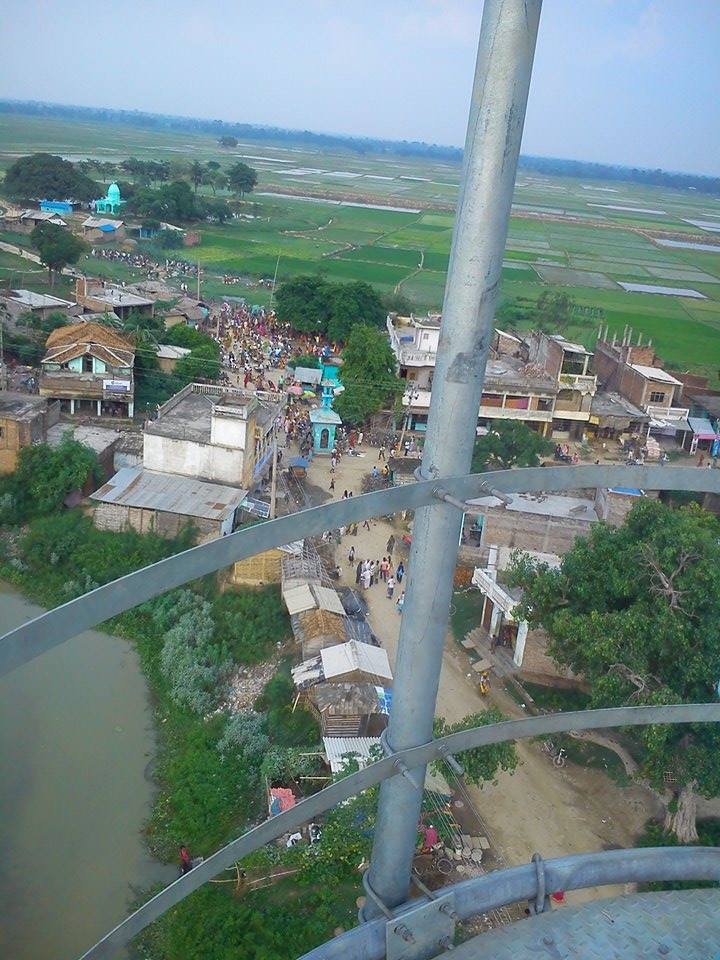
- Bhathihan Bazar in 2020(Tower view)
- Motto: Village of religious and cultural significance
- Location in Nepal
- Coordinates: 26.76°N 86.10°E
- Bhathihan Bazar: Nepal
- Zone: Janakpur Zone

Government
  - Ward Head: kari ram yadav(Nepal nekpa maowadi)
  - Deputy Mayor: Mrs. khatun(Nepali Communist Party)

Area
  - Total: 2.5 km^{2} (0.97 sq mi)

Population (2017)
  - Total: 9,000

Languages
  - Official: Maithili language
- Time zone: UTC+5:45 (NST)
- Postal code: 45600
- Area code: 041
- Website: http://bhathihanbazar.com.np

Bhathihan Bazar (Nepali: भठिहन) is one of the main bazar of Sabaila municipality in Dhanusa District of Province No. 2 of Nepal. Bhathihan Bazar was central village of Satoshar V.D.C., where the V.D.C. office was established. During the new law process of Nepal, this village lies under the Sabaila Municipality, Dhanusa.

== Schools ==
- Shree Jan-chetna primary School
- Happy Land English Boarding School
- Star English Boarding School
- Shree Ram janaki higher secondary school and college
- Royal Dhanusha boarding school
