= Dakor Boson =

The Dakor Boson are a type of proverbs or moral maxims popular in Assam, Northeast India that are connected to the livelihood of Assamese people and an important part of their oral literature. These proverbs, understood by everyone, gives moral instructions on various topics suitable for the lifestyle of the Assamese people. The Assamese people, especially in the past, attributed a philosophical personality to the author of this much-discussed treasure trove of practical advice and called him "Dakpurux". In Assamese literature, the proverbs known as "Dakor Boson" ("proverbs of Dak") from the name of Dakpurux sidered to be the oldest such oral literature. Although many of the Dak's proverbs have declined due to changes in current era, language and lifestyle, some proverbs are still prevalent and popular. These sayings have been passed down orally for centuries. The proverbs of Dak contain advice on politics, socio-politics, religion, economy, agriculture, cooking, benefits of journeys, descriptions of diseases, etc.

== Etymology ==
Dak is presented as an ordinary villager but with a deep feeling about life. He is said to have been a man of real knowledge from the time of his birth. It is said that when he was a baby, his mother tried to light a fire to give him warmth but could not lit having blowed with the pipe, then Dak said to his mother,

দীঘলকৈ মাৰিবাঁ ফু, তেতিয়াহে পাবা জুইৰ ভূ।

— Dakpurux
Translation:

Give a long blow, only then you'll get to see the fire.

— Translation

Dakor Boson or Dak's proverbs are associated with the names of persons like Ḍāk, Khona, Daṅka, Bhaḍḍar, Ghāgh, Bhaḍḍarī etc. Some also try to relate the proverbs to the Dakarnava text. However, the content and context of the Dakarnava does not match the Dakar Bachan.

== Dakor Boson in folklore ==
Dak is believed to be a contemporary of Barah-Mihir of the 4th-6th centuries and is believed to have been born at Lohi or Lohidangra in the Barpeta region. According to legend, Dak was born in the house of a potter woman. He us called Dak because he started to speak when he was born, as in Assamese, "dak" means "voice". As a child, he was thrown into the water by his friends while trying to pick flowers. Another legend says that Dak was born only for 'one day and one night' From such inconsistent accounts, it is difficult to consider Dak as a historical figure. Therefore, many scholars have accepted Dak as a fictitious name.
