= Mahendranagar, Dhanusha =

Sakhuwa Mahendranagar महेन्द्रनगर
- Mahendranagar
- Interactive map of Sakhuwa Mahendranagar
- Coordinates: 26.866742°N 85.963513°E
- Country: Nepal
- Zone: Janakpur Zone
- District: Dhanusa District

Population (1991)
  - Total: 10,209

Languages
  - Local: Nepali, Maithali
  - Official: Nepali
- Time zone: UTC+5:45 (Nepal Time)
- Postal code: 45600
- Area code: 041

Mahendranagar is a town in Chhireshwarnath Municipality of Dhanusa District in the Janakpur Zone of south-eastern Nepal. The formerly Village Development Committee was converted into municipality merging along with existing VDCs Ramdaiya, Sakhuwa Mahendranagar, Hariharpur and Digambarpur on 18 May 2014. At the time of the 1991 Nepal census it had a population of 10,209 persons living in 1916 individual households. Mahendranagar acts as bridge between Dhalkebar and Janakpur. Basically it is popular for its largest cattle market in the Nepal. It is assumed that 65% of cattle for e.g. buffalo, goats in Kathmandu valley are brought from here. The town is named after late king Mahendra.

== Education ==
Different private schools are opened here for quality education. Most of them are residential English and Nepali medium schools. Darshniya Rameshwor Singh Kushwaha Academy(D R S K Secondary English Boarding), Saraswati English Boarding School. Gangotri Secondary English Boarding School, New Parijat Educational Academy, Gyan Mandir Boarding, Darshniya Rameshwor Singh Kushwaha Academy (D.R.S.K Academy) and Pragati Shishu Sadan are also famous school of Chhireswor Municipality. Chhireswor Janta Higher Secondary School is the oldest Educational institute of Chhireshwor Municipality. Here is also Government School, which provides free education facilities. This school also Provide Dress to all the Students.

There are two Colleges in Chhireswornath Municipality. Chhireswor Janta Bahumukhi Campus is the oldest campus of chhireswarnath Municipality. Gangotri Campus is another Campus at Chhireswornath Municipality which is recently commenced.

== Industries ==
=== Tej Cement Factory ===
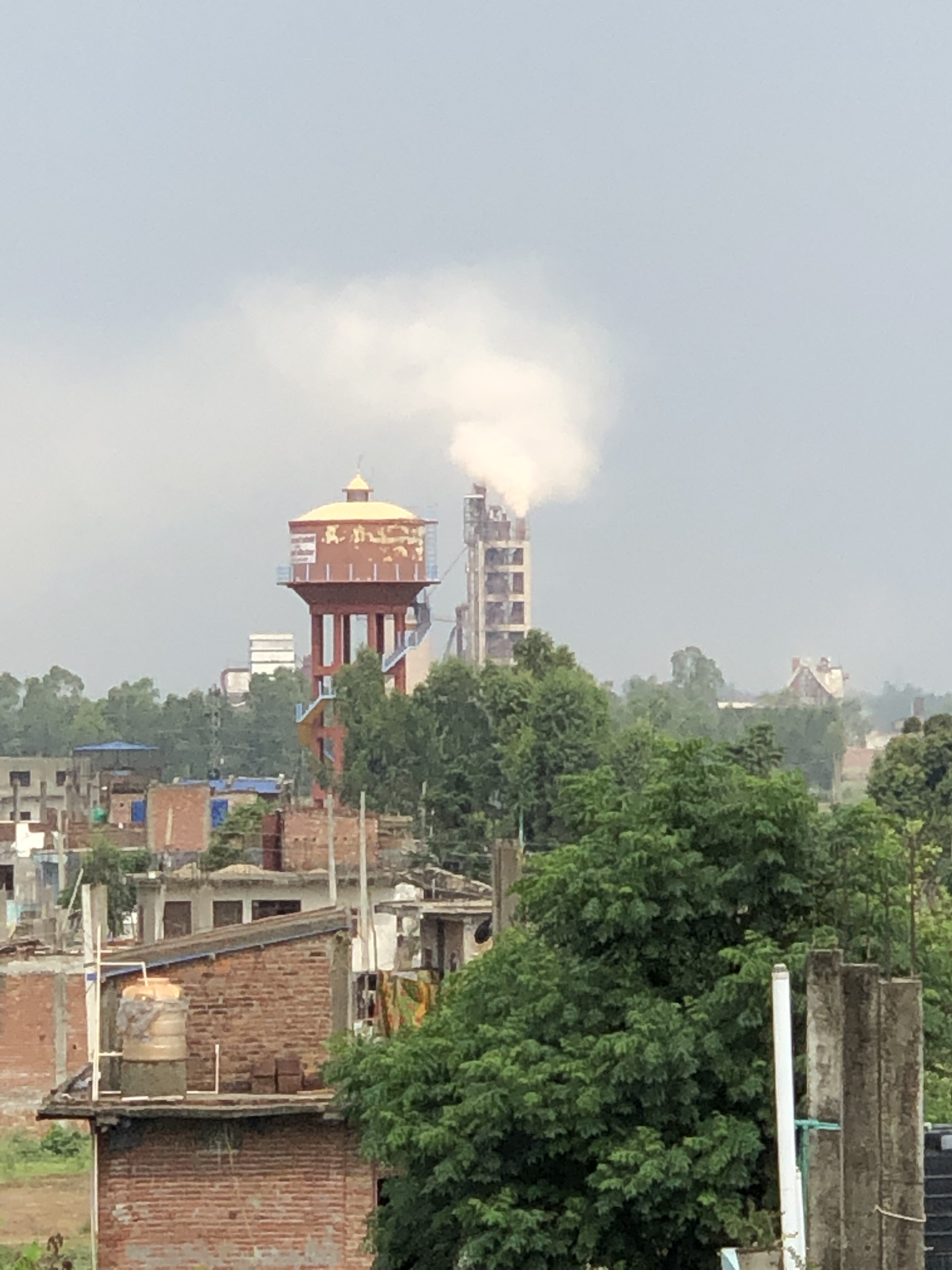
Tej Cement Factory

The only cement factory in Mahendranagar, Dhanusha, Nepal. It was established in 2000.

=== Everest Paper Industry ===
The only Paper Mill in Sakhuwa Mahendranagar, Dhanusha, Nepal.

=== Ram Janki Dalmoth Udhyog ===
The only Dalmoth Factory in Mahendranagar.

== Entertainment ==
Luv Kush Cinema Hall

The only movie threater in Chhireswarnath municipality. Periodically stage shows, concerts and plays are occasionally organized by the local clubs and organizations. People here enjoys a lot during some festivals like Holi, Tihar, Deepawali, Dashain, etc.

== Geography and climate ==
Ratna Sagar, Janakpur

Chhireswarnath is located in the Terai, forested and marshy terrain at the base of the Himalaya mountain range. The major rivers surrounding are Aurahi, Jalad. Chhireswarnath Municipality is famous for its temples (Shiv temple).

One can see all the six seasons in Chhireswarnath. Basant ritu (Spring - February/March), Grisma ritu (Summer - April/May/June), Barsha ritu (Rainy - July/August), Sharad ritu (Autumn - September/October), Hemanta ritu (Autumn-winter - November/December), Shishir ritu (Winter - December/January).

The best time to visit in Chhireswar is from September to March as the weather is pleasant and several festivals fall during this period.
