= Dipak Karki (Dhanusha politician) =

Nepalese politician

Honourable Dipak Karki
- दीपक कार्की

Member of Parliament, Pratinidhi Sabha
- Incumbent
- Assumed office 22 December 2022
- Constituency: Dhanusha 1

Personal details
- Born: 3 February 1964 (age 62)
- Party: PSP-N
- Other political affiliations: Nepali Congress (till 2017)
- Spouse: Anjana Basnet
- Parent: Balram Singh Karki (father)

Dipak Karki is a Nepalese politician from the People's Socialist Party, Nepal, and is currently serving as a member of the 2nd Federal Parliament of Nepal. In the 2022 Nepalese general election, he was elected from Dhanusha 1 (constituency).
