= Koriyahi =

Village in Sitamarhi, Bihar

- Village
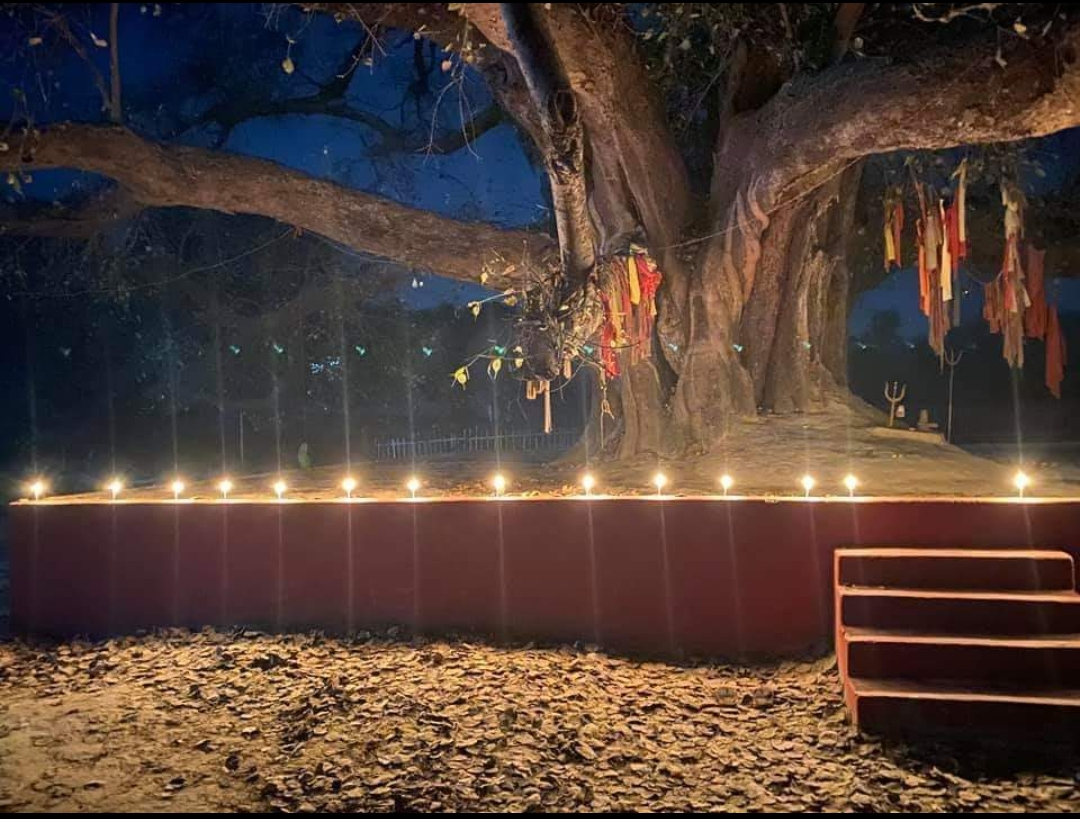
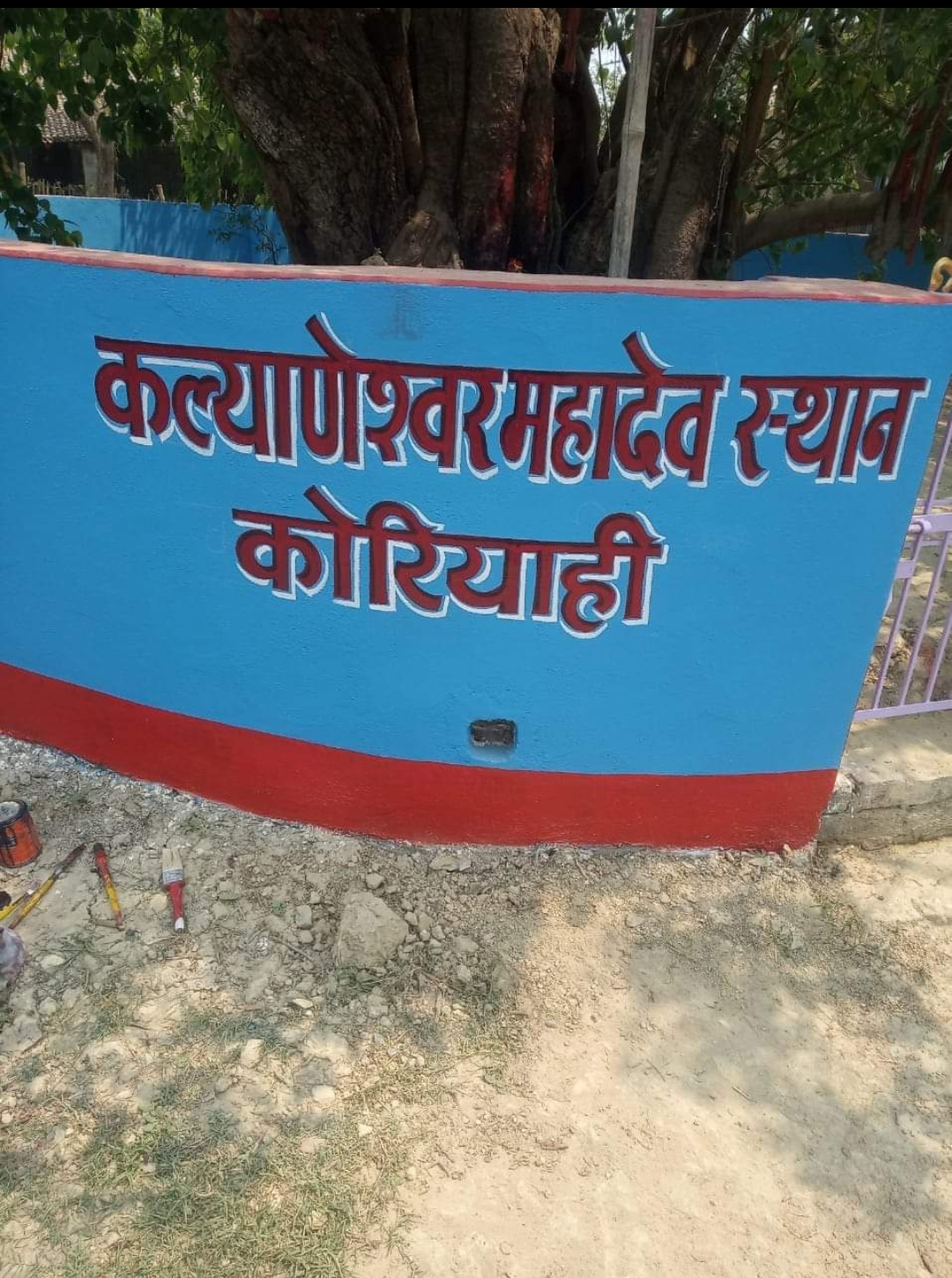
- Country: India
- State: Bihar
- District: Sitamarhi
- Block: Sursand
- Language: Maithili
- Pin Code: 843331
- Police Station: Bhittha
- Elevation: 63 m (207 ft)

Population (2011)
  - Total: 4,263
- Area code: 06228
- Vehicle registration: BR 30

Koriyahi(previously known as Kalyanpatti) is a village in the Sitamarhi district in the Mithila region of Bihar, India. It falls under Sursand block and is served by Bhittha Police Station.The village is located about 38 kilometres from Sitamarhi and around 5 kilometres from Bhitthamore near the India–Nepal border.

== Geography ==
The village has tolas named Gachi tola, Dacchinwari tola (North), Uttarwari tola (South), Purwari tola (East), tirpit nagar, Kumhar toli, etc.

== Transportation ==
Koriyahi village is well connected with sitamarhi via Bhitthamore by bus transportation.

== Festivals ==
Durga Pooja and Kali Pooja are the village's primary festivals. The other major festival of this area is Chhath Puja in which people offer prayers to the Sun. Holi, Diwali, Dussehra, Makar Sankranti, Eid al-Fitr and Christmas are celebrated.

== Trade and economy ==
The main source of trading for villagers is from Yaddupatti bazar market which was previously known as Koriyahi bazaar.

== Landmarks ==
- Durga Mata mandir
- Dayal baba
- Muni baba
