= Kshireshwar Nath Mahadev Mandir =

Shiva temple in India

- क्षीरेश्वर नाथ महादेव मंदिर
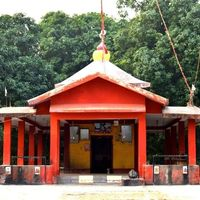
- Kshireshwar Nath Mahadev Mandir in the Mithila region of Nepal

Religion
- Affiliation: Hinduism
- District: Dhanusha District
- Province: Madhesh Pradesh
- Deity: Lord Shiva
- Festival: Mithila Madhya Parikrama

Location
- Location: Chhireshwarnath Town, Mithila region, Nepal
- Country: Nepal
- Interactive map of Kshireshwar Nath Mahadev Mandir
- Coordinates: 26.8688°N 85.9802°E

Architecture
- Founder: King Janaka
- An ancient Shivalinga established by the King Janaka in Mithila

Kshireshwar Nath Mahadev Mandir (Sanskrit: क्षीरेश्वर नाथ महादेव मंदिर, Romanised: Kṣīreśvar) also known as Chhireshwarnath or Chhileshwarnath Mahadev Mandir is an ancient temple of Lord Shiva in the Mithila region of Nepal. It is located at Chhireshwarnath town in the Dhanusha district of the Madhesh Pradesh in Nepal. The Shivalinga of the temple is believed to be established by the King Janaka in ancient Mithila Kingdom.

== Description ==
Kshireshwar Nath Mahadev Mandir is one of the four major Shivalingas on the four corners of the capital city Janakpur in Mithila. The location of the temple is considered as the third gate of the capital of ancient Mithila Kingdom. It is also the part of the Mithila Madhya Parikrama.

The temple lies 12 miles to the north from the Janaki Mandir. Its legendary importance was recognised by the 17th century's Sannyasi Shurkishordas.
