= Parthiva Shivalinga Puja =

Tradition of worshiping Shiva in Mithila

- पार्थिव शिवलिंग पुजा
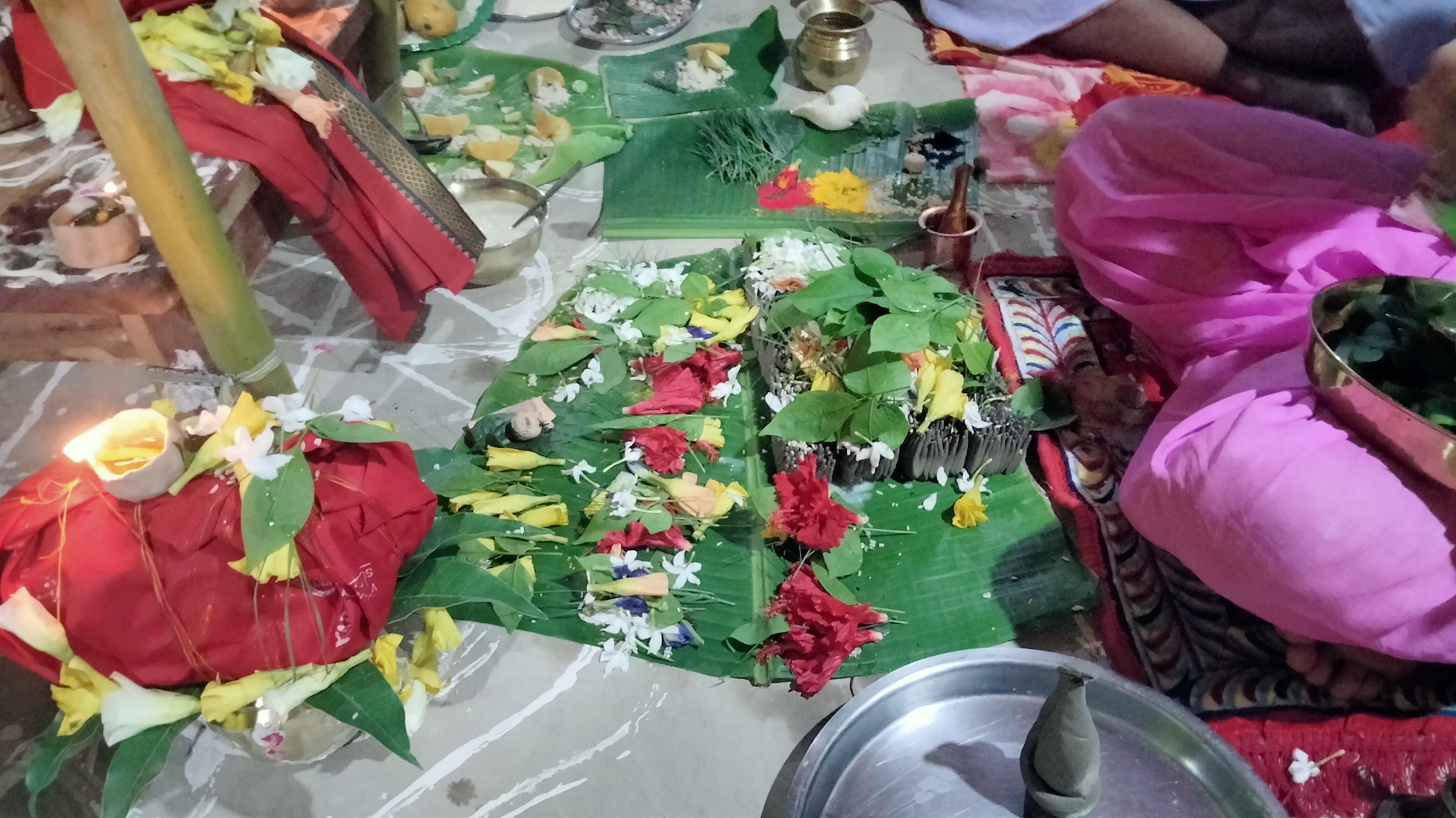
- Parthiva Shivalinga Puja during Satynarayan Puja occasion at a Maithil Brahmin home in the Mithila region
- Type: Worship of mud Shivalingas
- Classification: Hinduism
- Scripture: Shiva Purana
- Region: Mithila region
- Founder: Rishi Mandapa
- Form of worship of Shiva in the Mithila region of the Indian Subcontinent.

Parthiva Shivalinga Puja (Devanagari: पार्थिव शिवलिंग पुजा, Romanised: Pārthiva Śivaliṅga Pūjā) is a popular tradition of worshiping Shiva in the Mithila region of the Indian Subcontinent. In this tradition, devotee worships Shivalingas made by mud. The mud Shivalingas are worshipped either individually at home or at public place by large groups of devotees.

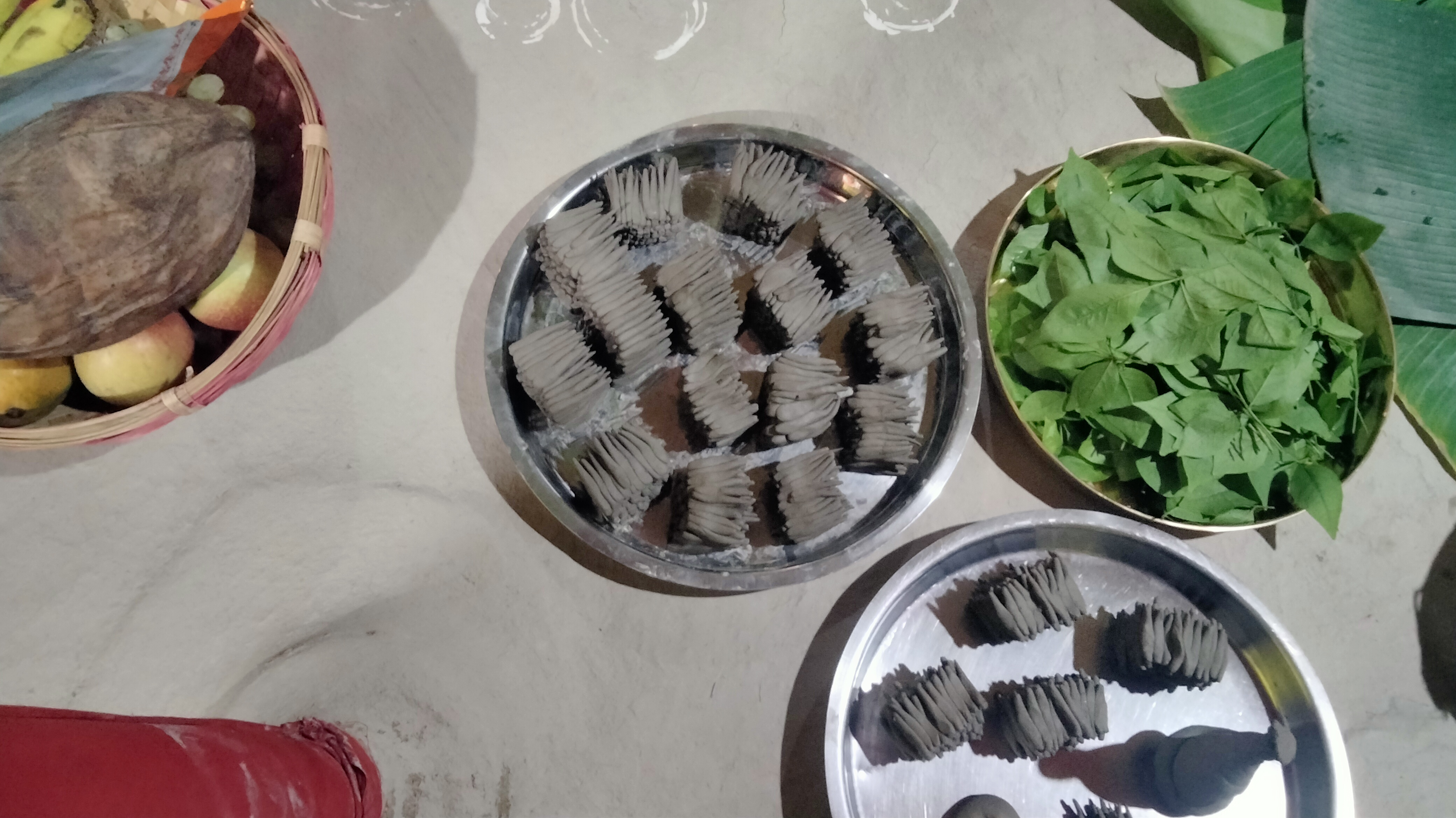
Image of Parthiva Shivalinga in the Mithila region

== Etymology ==
Parthiva Shivlinga Puja is a group of three Indic words Parthiva, Shivlinga and Puja. The literal meaning of Parthiva is earthly i.e., made from earthly material like soil, sand or mud. Similarly Shivalinga is the iconic representation of Shiva and Puja literally means worship. Therefore, the literal meaning of Parthiva Shivlinga Puja is the worship of Shivlinga made by soil, sand or mud.

== Description ==
The tradition of the Parthiva Shivalinga Puja originated in the Hindu text Shiva Purana. According to the text Shiva Purana, the Parthiva Shivalingas should be made from the soil of a holy river or pond. In the text Shiva Purana, when sages asked about the greatness of the Parthiva Shivalingas to Suta, then he explained the greatness of the worship of the Parthiva Shivalingas. Suta told that Parthiva Shivalinga is the best form of Shiva among his eight cosmic bodies. He further said that Brahmins, Vishnu, Prajapati and other sages had achieved the great things they had desired by worshipping the Parthiva Shivalingas. Similarly Devatas, Asuras, Gandharvas and many men had achieved greatness by worshipping it. In Kali Yuga, the Parthiva Shivalinga is the most auspicious form of Shiva to worship. It is said that in Kali Yuga, the sage Mandapa started the worship of Parthiva Shivlinga. The sage Mandapa was the son of the sage Kushmanda. Since the tradition is originated from the text Shiva Purana, it could be followed by any Hindu adherents but it is less seen in other parts of the subcontinent. This tradition is still alive and popular among the Maithil communities in the Mithila region. In this region, Maithil Brahmins still follow the tradition of the Parthiva Shivalingas Puja in their homes while worshiping Shiva. It is also practiced, during the festival of the Mithila tradition of Durga Puja, by the man of the family in the region. They also organise grand ceremonies of the Parthiva Shivalingas Puja at some big public grounds in the region on some auspicious day every year.

Similarly there is story in the Mahatmya of Kedaareshwara and Bhimashankara Jyotirlinga about the two avatars Nara and Naaraayana of Vishnu who worshipped making Parthiva Shivalingas daily during their Tapasyas at Badarikaashrama.

In the Treta Yuga, Rama worshipped Parthiva Shivalinga. In Ramayana, there is a reference of Rama worshipping Parthiva Shivalinga on the bank of Indian Ocean at Rameshwaram. It is said that before attacking the King Ravana of Lanka, Rama made a Parthiva Shivalinga with the sand on the ocean bank to worship Shiva, so that he would be blessed by Shiva for the victory on the King Ravana.

== Parthiva Shivalingas ==
In the Mithila region, very thin and smaller Shivalingas are made for worship. These small Shivalingas are joined together in a 10×10 arrangement to form square shape of 100 Shivalingas. This square shaped 100 Shivalingas is considered as one unit. It is worshipped only once time and after the worship it is immersed in the soil of the earth. If a large number of them have to be worshipped in one day, then 10 chekis can be kept together and worshipped. The process of making the Parthiva Shivalingas is detailed in the text Shaiva Sarvasvasara composed by the great Maithil poet Vidyapati.

== Observances ==
Devotees of Mithila region have organised some major grand celebration of the Parthiva Shivalingas Puja, which have been recorded as notable grand celebration in the region. These grand celebrations have created histories of the notable milestones for worshiping a very large numbers of the Parthiva Shivalingas by a very large numbers of devotees at some public places in the region.

The second grand celebration of the Parthiva Shivalingas Puja was organised at the Saurath Sabha Gachhi near the outskirts of the city of Madhubani in the year 2022. It said that around 3 crores 51 lakhs Parthiva Shivalingas were made and worshiped by the devotees there.

Similarly at the campus of Mukteshwar Sthan Mandir in the Devahar village of Madhubani district, a grand celebration of the Parthiva Shivalingas Puja was organised on 5 November 2023, in which around 1 crore 25 lakhs of Parthiva Shivalingas were made and worshiped by devotees.

On the occasion of Akshay Navami on 10 November 2024, the fifth grand Parthiva Shivalingas Puja was organised at the campus of Dayal Baba Durga Mandir in Koriyahi village of the Sitamarhi district in Mithila region. In this grand celebration, around 2 crores 91 lakhs of Parthiva Shivalingas were made and worshiped by the devotees participated in the celebration. In the celebration, Brahmins from different 101 villages of the Madhubani, Darbhanga and Sitamarhi districts including the Mithila region of Nepal participated for making and worshipping the Parthiva Shivalingas there.
