= Achhinjal =

Sacred water for worship in Hinduism

- अछिनजल
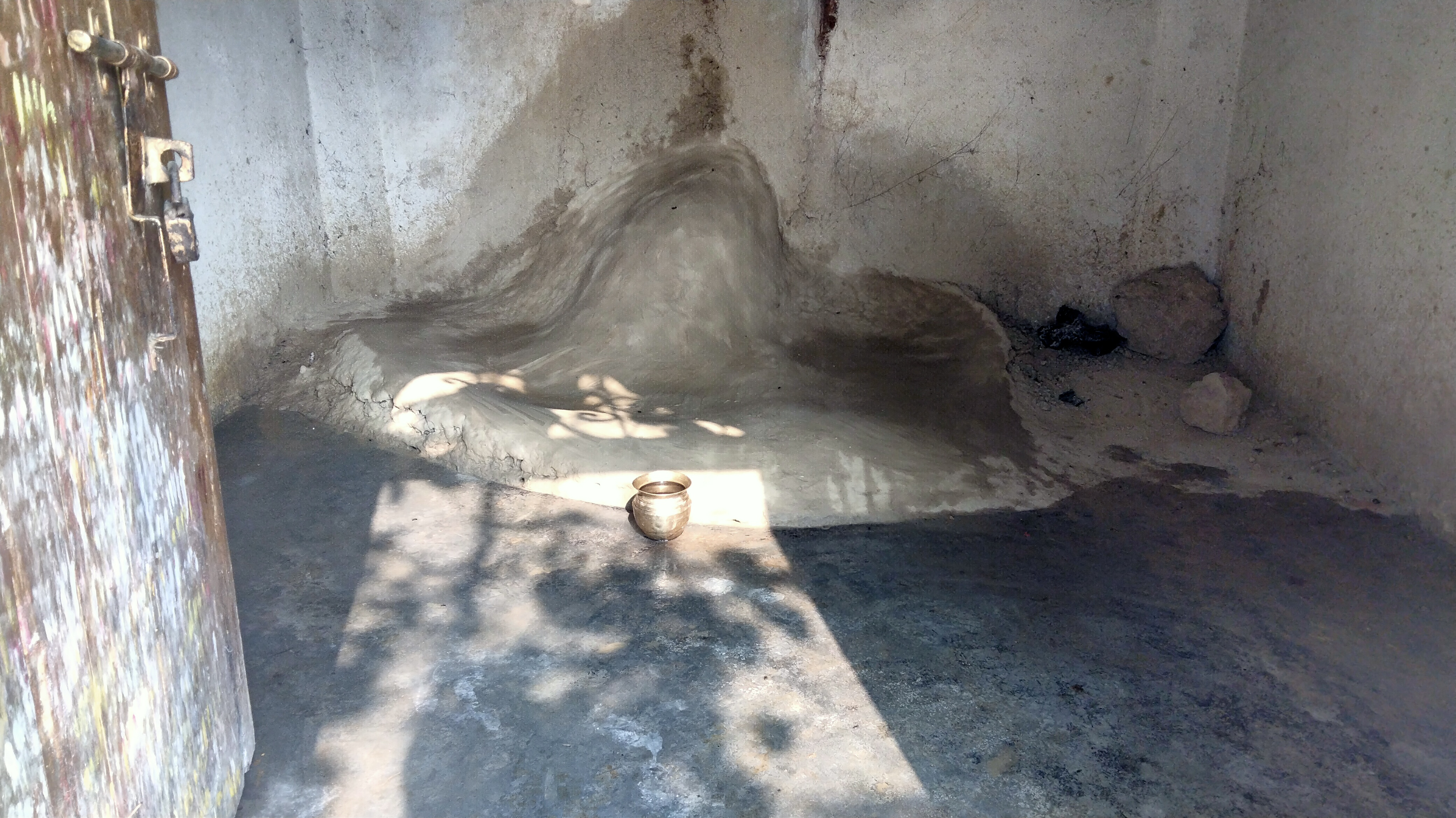
- Achhinjal kept in a brass Lota for worshiping Brahma Sthan at Basuki Bihari village
- Type: Sacred water
- Classification: Hinduism
- Region: Mithila region
- Language: Maithili
- Recognition: Maithil culture

Achhinjal (Maithili: अछिनजल) is a term used for sacred water in the Mithila region of the Indian subcontinent. It is used in Hindu religious rituals and worship purposes. It is kept in lota which is a globular water vessel generally made of brass. In the tradition of Mithila, once water is intended Achhinjal for worship, becomes impure if used for any other purpose.

== Description ==
In the Maithili literature, the term Achhinjal is used to denote sacred water for worship purposes and religious rituals. Brahmins or devotees carry one lota of Achhinjal from some sacred sources of water. Once the sacred water in a lota is designated as Achhinjal, it should not be used for any other purpose, otherwise the water is not considered as Achhinjal. There are some strict rules for maintaining the symbolic purification of the Achhinjal water in Hinduism. In early times, water of inaar (well) in the region was generally used as Achhinjal.

In the Maithil culture, some Achhinjal is sprinkled on the land for its religious purification by chanting Pavitra Mantra, where worship of God is going to be performed by Pundit. It is also sprinkled on the body of devotee for his symbolic purification of the inner self.

== Literary works ==
In the 20th century, the Maithili scholar Babu Saheb Chaudhary wrote a literary text known as Achhinjal which is his one of the important literary works.
