= Govindadas (Maithili language poet) =

Bengali Vaishnava Poet and Composer

Govindadas was a Maithili poet of the late 17th century, one of the greatest Maithili poets after Vidyapati. He was one of such Maithili poet claimed to be a Bengali poet. The age of Govindadas is uncertain and so is his identity. He belonged to a family of Karna Kayasthas and was a contemporary of King Sundar Thakur (ca. 1663–1770). He was a Vaishnava and said to have written a long poem called Krishnalila which may be the series of Radha Krishna padas composed by him. He excelled in ornamentation and sophistication and had greater interest in the use of alankarashastra. His brothers Gangadas, Ramdas and Haridas were also writers.

He was a devotee of Krishna, and his command over the language was unique. His great achievement was metrical perfection added to musical resonance and rhythmic movement. His expressions in superb languages are lucid. His poems on the Radhakrishna legend have a unity of description and treatment in the delineation of Krishna's sorts and the Viraha of the Gopis. In his poems he deals with Mana, Viraha, Vasantalila, Rasalila, Radhavarna, Abhisara. His lyrical songs bear the impressions of vast learning and most of them are in a language known as Brajbuli.
