= Ganeshman Charanath =

Ganeshman Charanath गणेशमान चारनाथ
- Municipality
- Municipality in Nepal
- Location in Nepal
- Coordinates: 26.90°N 86.09°E
- Country: Nepal
- Development Region: Central
- District: Dhanusa
- Province: Madhesh

Government
  - Mayor: Jit Narayan Yadav (NC)
  - Deputy Mayor: Tulsa Kumari Pandey (NC)

Area
  - Total: 244.31 km^{2} (94.33 sq mi)

Population (2011)
  - Total: 37,300
  - Density: 153/km^{2} (395/sq mi)
  - Religions: Hindu Muslim Christian

Language
  - Local: Maithili, Tharu, Nepali
- Time zone: UTC+5:45 (NST)
- Postal Code: 45600
- Area code: 041
- Website: www.ganeshmancharnathmun.gov.np

Ganeshman Charanath (Nepali: गणेशमान चारनाथ) is a municipality in Dhanusha District in Madhesh province of Nepal. It was formed in 2016 occupying current 11 sections (wards) from previous 11 VDCs. It occupies an area of 244.31 km^{2} with a total population of 37,300.
