= Satosar =

Satoshar सत्तोषर Sapteshwor Dham
- Village Development Committee
- Nickname: Kushmaha Satoshar
- Location in Nepal
- Coordinates: 26°46′45″N 86°05′08″E
- Country: Nepal
- Zone: Janakpur Zone
- District: Dhanusha District

Population (1991)
  - Total: 4,872
- Time zone: UTC+5:45 (Nepal Time)

Kushmaha Satoshar is a village of Satoshar Village Development Committee in Dhanusha District in the Janakpur Zone of South-Eastern Nepal. At the time of the 1991 Nepal census it had a population of 4,872 persons living in 925 individual households.

The village holds a sacred site known as Sapteshwar Nath Mahadev Mandir related to Ramayana in Hinduism. It is an important destination in the sacred journey of the Mithila Madhya Parikrama.
