= Kalyaneshwar Mahadev Mandir =

Ancient Shiva temple in Mithila, India

Coordinates: 26.6019°N 85.9942°E

- कल्याणेश्वर महादेव मंदिर
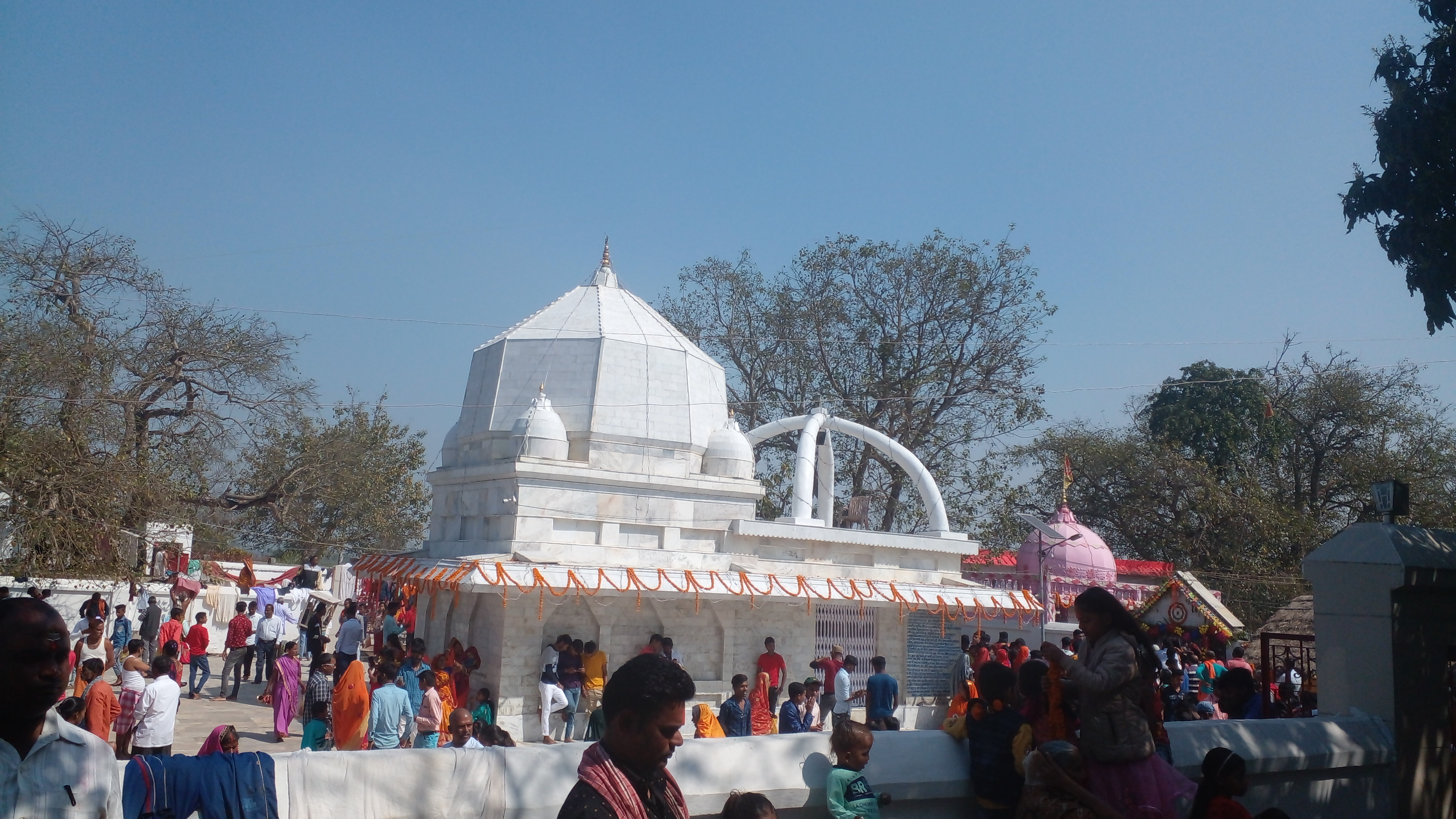
- View of Kalyaneshwar Dham

Religion
- Affiliation: Hinduism
- District: Madhubani
- Deity: Lord Shiva
- Festivals: Mahashivratri, Narak Niwaran Chaturdashi, Sombari, Mithila Madhya Parikrama

Location
- Location: Kalna village, Harlakhi, Madhubani district, Mithila region
- State: Bihar, Mithila region
- Country: India
- Interactive map of Kalyaneshwar Mahadev Mandir

Architecture
- Architect: Viswakarma
- Type: Hinduism
- Founder: Janaka
- Creator: Viswakarma
- Established: Treta Yuga
- Site area: Ancient
- Legendary place related to the epic Ramayana

Kalyaneshwar Mahadev Mandir (Maithili: कल्याणेश्वर महादेव मंदिर) was established by King Janaka in Mithila. The temple is also the part of Mithila Madhya Parikrama circuit. The temple is situated at Kalna village of Harlakhi block in Madhubani district. It is said that King Janaka established Shivlings in all the four directions from Janakpur. The Shivling of this temple is one of them. Since the temple is very ancient and historical, so it is very famous in the region.

During the month of Sawan, millions of pilgrims come to the temple, carrying holy water from the Kamala River in Jaynagar. Every Monday during the month of Sawan, a huge crowd of devotees flock to the Shivalaya for performing sacred Jalabhisheka on the Kalyaneshwar Shivalinga. According to a pandaji of the temple, 18 Pandas are engaged in the service of the Shivalinga also called as Baba by locals.

== Description ==
The temple is located near Indo-Nepal Border area in Harlakhi block of Madhubani district. The pilgrims of the historical and the cultural journey Mithila Madhya Parikrama take second night rest at this place. Since the temple is related to Ramayana therefore, the Government of Bihar declared the site as tourist centre. According to the text Ramcharitmanas of Tulsi Das, the King Janaka did penance here devoted to his ishta devta Lord Shiva. Lord Shiva was pleased with the penance of the King Janaka and appeared in the form of Kalyaneshwar. Then King Janaka established a Shivling here in the devotion to Lord Shiva and God Viswakarma built the temple around the Shivling. The temple is also considered as one of the gates of the ancient capital of Mithila. Similarly according to the present priest Pandit Raju Thakur of the temple, the place was established by the King Nimi who was the father of the first Janaka known as King Mithi. In the texts Puranas, there are mentions of the King Janaka worshipping here.

== Present architecture ==
The present structure of the temple is around 200 years old. The structure of the temple is dome shaped. The sanctum sanctorum of the Shivalaya is ten feet below the earth surface, where the Shivalinga is established. The Kalyaneshwar Shivalinga is rough and has a large diameter. Its base is six feet deep. Apart from the main Shivalaya temple, there are other several temples of the other different deities in Hinduism. There is a sacred pond in premises, which water is used as Achhinjal for Jalabhisheka on the Shivalinga of the Shivalaya.

The campus of the temple is spread over an area of 16 acres land.

== Kalna Paramhansa ==
The temple is also very famous for Kalna Baba Ashram. Kalna Baba is also known as Kalna Paramhansa. He was a spiritual leader and philosopher, who stayed at Kalyaneshwar Mahadev Mandir and taught the people coming there about spiritual knowledge. He is also considered as the avatar of Lord Shiva in the Kalyaneshwar Mahadev Mandir. He was very famous for his kindness and spiritual energy. It is said that he cured many people who come to him in the hope of solutions of their problems.

== Kalaneshwar Mahotsav ==
In the year 2026, the Government of Bihar has initiated one-day grand celebration known as Kalaneshwar Mahotsav at the premises of the temple to highlights the importance of the temple for Hindu pilgrimage. It was inaugurated on the occasion of the Mahashivratri festival by the tourism minister Arun Shankar Prasad of the Bihar Government along with some other dignitaries.

== Upradation ==
On 11 May 2026, due to having the religious significance associated with the Ramayana, the temple has been recognised as a tourist destination for Hindu pilgrimage in the world by the Government of Bihar in India. The government has announced a budget of 13 crore 60 lakh 99 thousand Indian rupees for tourism development of the premises. The Bihar Government Tourism Development Corporation Limited will look after the development works. The tender for the development works is expected to be release on 6 June 2026.
