= Chhireshwarnath =

Kshireshwornath क्षिरेश्वरनाथ
- Municipality
- Location in Nepal
- Coordinates: 26°52′43″N 85°59′00″E
- Country: Nepal
- Province: Madhesh Province
- District: Dhanusa

Government
  - Type: kshireshwornath Municipality
  - Mayor: Sukhdev yadav (UML)
  - Deputy Mayor: Rarchana Shrestha (NC)

Area
  - Total: 50.85 km^{2} (19.63 sq mi)

Population
  - Total: 42,541
  - Density: 836.6/km^{2} (2,167/sq mi)

Languages
  - Local: Nepali, Maithili
- Time zone: UTC+5:45 (NST)
- Area code: 041
- Website: kshireshwornathmun.gov.np

Chhireshwarnath (Nepali: छिरेश्वरनाथ) is a municipality in the Dhanusa District of Madhesh Province of Nepal. The municipality was established on 18 May 2014, as a result of the merger between Village Development Committees Ramdaiya, Kumhraul, Sakhuwa Mahendranagar, Hariharpur, Gopalpur, Baninya, and Digambarpur.

Mahendranagar is one of the villages in Kshireshwornath. Its population was recorded to be 10,209 people as of August 2020. Mahendranagar acts as a bridge connecting Dhalkebar and Janakpur. It has the largest cattle market in Nepal and is the assumed source of 65% of cattle, buffalo, and goats in the Kathmandu valley. It also has health facilities that serve the neighbouring communities and one of the largest paper factories in Nepal, Everest Paper Mill, which provides employment to most of the region's residents.

Dudhmati is one of the largest lakes of Dhanusha District. Kshireshwar Nath Mahadev Mandir is one of the most popular temples dedicated to the God Shiva.

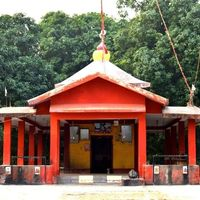
Chhireshwornath Temple

Sakhuwabazar has a famous market located in Kshireshwornath Municipality; it is the heart of Kshireshwornath. It has an average annual income of more than 1.25 crore. The municipality and the majority of the people residing in Kshireshwornath are heavily dependent on the local market.

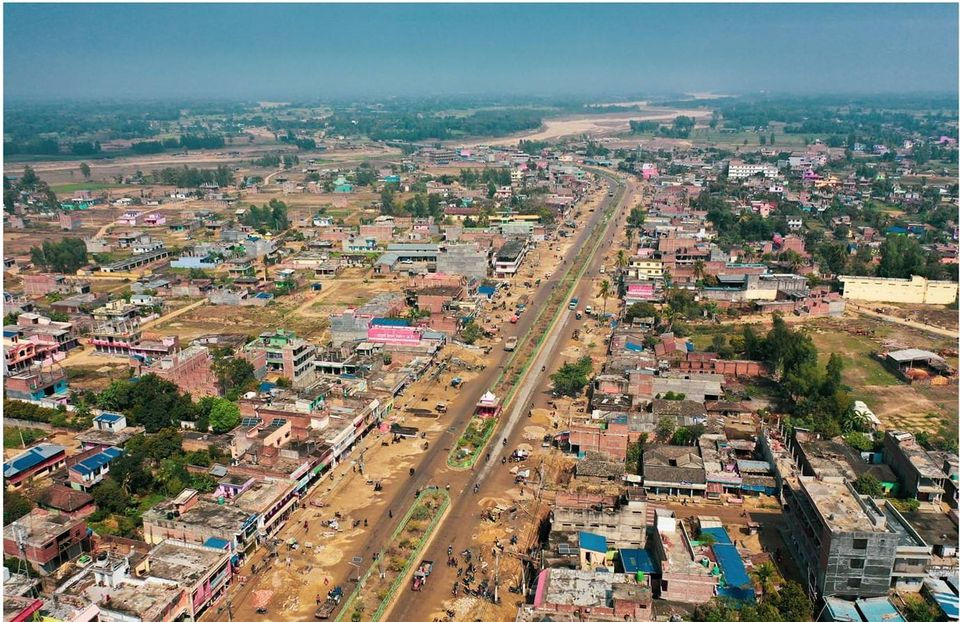
Mahendranagar Aerial View(Town in Kshireshwornath Municipality)

== Government ==
-Mayor: Sukhdev Yadav (CPN-UML)

-Deputy Mayor: Rachana Shrestha (Nepali Congress)

Sukhdev Yadav won the mayoral election with 7,913 votes defeating Yogendra Pajiyar (Nepali Congress) who secured 7,300 votes.

== Entertainment ==
Stage shows, concerts, and plays are occasionally organized by local clubs and organizations. At an earlier time, two movie theatres operated in the city: Radha Talkies and Lavkush Chalachitra Mandir. However, due to the rise of technology and home entertainment facilities, they have closed. Lavkush Chalachitra Mandir is reopened.

== Geography and climate ==
Sakhuwa, Mahendranagar

Kshireshwornath is located in the Terai, the forested and marshy terrain at the base of the Himalaya mountain range. The major rivers surrounding it are the Aurahi and Jalad. Kshireshwornath Municipality is famous for its temples and derived its name from the temple Kshireshwornath.

One can see all six seasons in Kshireshwornath: Basant Ritu (Spring – February/March), Grisma Ritu (Summer – April/May/June), Barsha Ritu (Rainy – July/August), Sharad Ritu (Autumn - September/October), Hemanta Ritu (Autumn-winter - November/December), Shishir Ritu (Winter - December/January).

The best time to visit Kshireshwornath is between September and March. During this period, the weather is pleasant and there are several festivals.

== Festivals ==
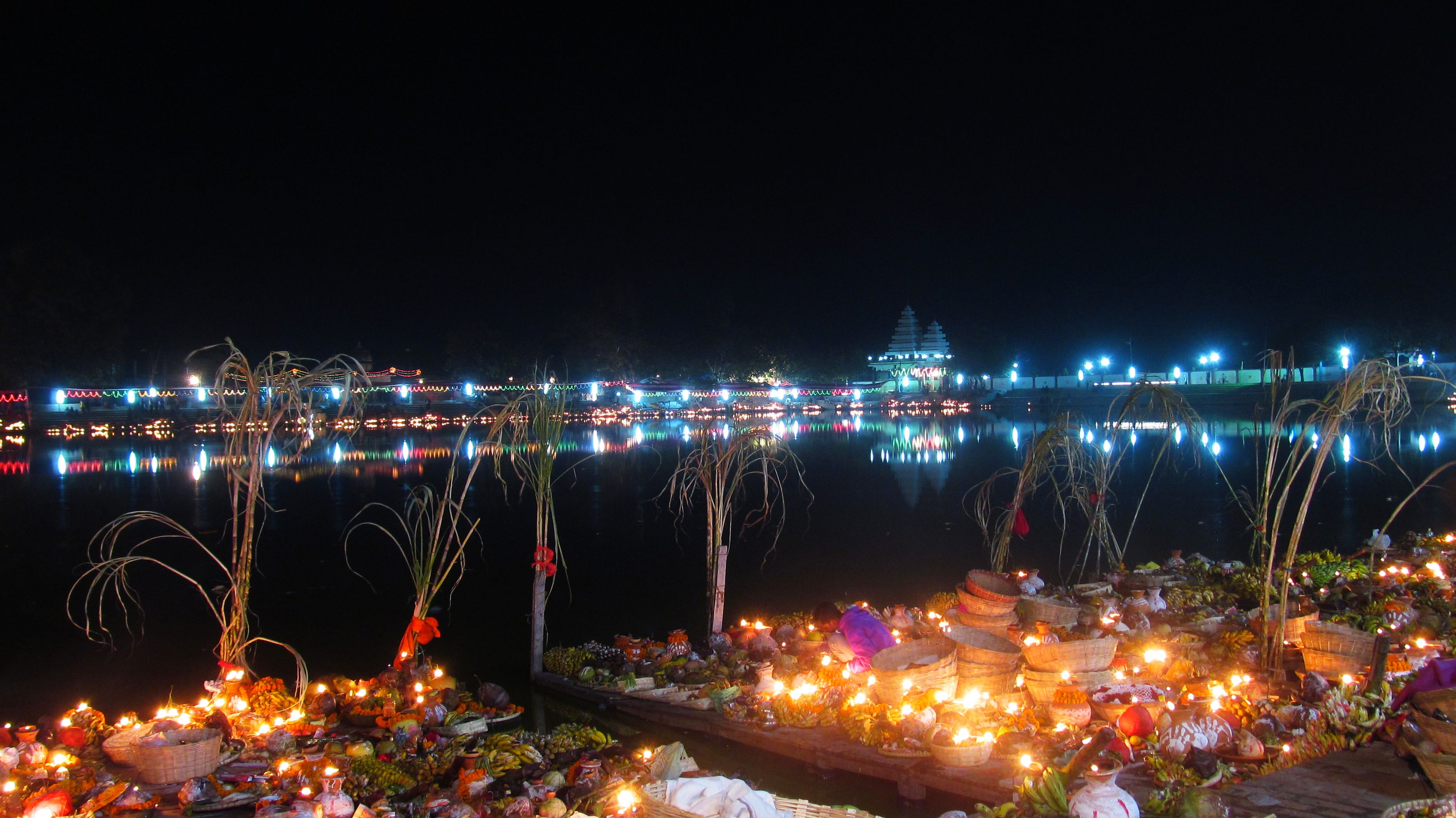
Chhath in Sakhuwabazar

There are many festivals celebrated in Kshireshwornath municipality including Chaat, Bhai Tika, Dipawali, Bijaya Dashami, Eid al-Fitr and Eid al-Adha, Holi, and Raksha Bandhan.

== Education ==
Chhireshwor Janata Madhyamik Bidhyalaya is One of the Oldest School called Public Shaikshik Guthi. There are 20 community school and 4 religious schools and 20 private Schools but the quality of education and the education System is not at Par.The School has Lack of Playgrounds and Playful environment for Children.

== Social organization ==
- Dhanusha Kabadi Kho-Kho Academy: One of the sports organizations in the city that covers the small area of Mahendranagar.

== Commercial and industrial facilities ==
The Main Industry Located here are as Follows 1.Shree Ram Janaki Dalmoth Udhyog 2.Everest Paper Mill 3.Chhireshwor Distilary
