= Maithili literature =

Literature in the Maithili language

Maithili literature is the entire collection of poetry, novels, short stories, documents and other writings in the Maithili language. The major ancient sources of the Maithili literature are Lorik Katha Geet, Daak Vachan, Varnaratnakara and Kritilata, etc. The most famous literary figure in Maithili is the poet Vidyapati (1350–1450), who wrote his poems in the language of the people, i.e., Maithili, at a time when state's official language was Sanskrit and Sanskrit was being used as a literary language. The use of Maithili, instead of Sanskrit, in literature became more common after Vidyapati. In the later period, the literary legacy was carried out by several other poets and scholars like Chanda Jha, Lalkavi and Pandit Lal Das, etc in the region.

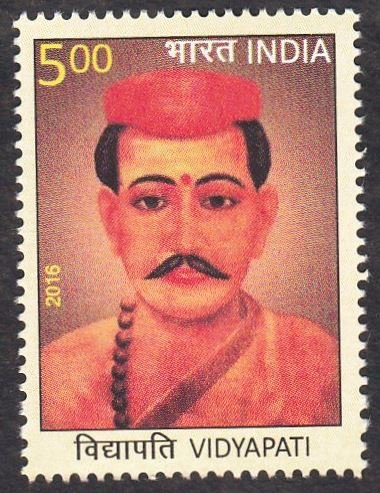
Stamp of India depicting Vidyapati, the prominent figure in the tradition of the Maithili literature in the Indian subcontinent.

The main characteristics of Magadhi Prakrit is to mutate 'r' into 's', the 'n' for n, of 'j' for 'y', of 'b' for 'y' In the edicts of Ashoka the change of 'r' to 'h' is established. Mahavir and Buddha delivered their sermons in the eastern languages. The secular use of language came mainly from the east as will be evident from the Prakritpainglam, a comprehensive work on Prakrit and Apabhramsa-Avahatta poetry. Jyotirishwar mentions Lorika. Vachaspati II in his Tattvachintamani and Vidyapati in his Danavakyavali have profusely used typical Maithili words of daily use.

The Maithili script, Mithilakshara or Tirhuta as it is popularly known, is of a great antiquity. The Lalitavistara mentions the Vaidehi script. Early in the latter half of the 7th century A.D., a marked change occurred in the northeastern alphabet, and the inscriptions of Adityasena exhibit this change for the first time. The eastern variety develops and becomes the Maithili script, which comes into use in Assam, Bengal, and Nepal. The earliest recorded epigraphic evidence of the script is found in the Mandar Hill Stone inscriptions of Adityasena in the 7th century A.D., now fixed in the Baidyanath temple of Deoghar.

The language of the Buddhist dohas is described as belonging to the mixed Maithili—Kamrupi language.

== Early Maithili Literature (ca. 700–1350 AD) ==
The period was of ballads, songs, and dohas. Some important Maithili writers of this era were:

- Jyotirishwar Thakur (1290–1350) whose Varnartnakar (1324 AD) is the first prose and encyclopedia in northern Indian language.

== Middle Maithili Literature (ca. 1350–1830 AD) ==
The period was of theatrical writings. Some important Maithili writers of this era were:

- Vidyapati (1350–1450)
- Srimanta Sankardeva (1449–1568)
- Govindadas (late 17th century)

== Modern Maithili Literature (1830 AD to date) ==
Modern Maithili came into its own after George Abraham Grierson, an Irish linguist and civil servant, tirelessly researched Maithili folklore and transcribed its grammar. Paul R. Brass wrote that "Grierson judged that Maithili and its dialects could fairly be characterized as the language of the entire population of Janakpur, Siraha, Saptari, Sarlahi,Rautahat, Darbhanga and Madhubani".

In April 2010 a translation of the New Testament into Maithili was published by the Bible Society of India under joint copyright with Nepal Wycliffe Bible Translators.

The development of Maithili in the modern era was due to magazines and journals. Some important writers of this era are:

- Baldev Mishra (1890–1975)
- Surendra Jha 'Suman' (1910–2002) represented Maithili in the Sahitya Akademi
- Radha Krishna Choudhary (1921–1985)
- Jaykant Mishra (20 December 1922 – 3 February 2009) represented Maithili in the Sahitya Akademi
- Parichay Das (1964– )
- Gajendra Thakur (1971– )
- Santosh Kr. Mishra (1980– )

"......Umesh Mishra had expressed his desire to include the literary history of Maithili under a volume on modern Indian Languages, but the biggest impediment to Maithili getting official recognition as a distinct language was its erroneous identification in the colonial imagination either as a dialect of Bengali or Hindi or its construction as a ganweri boli [language of peasants]. In a letter written in September 1934, Bhola Lal Das, one of the pioneers of Maithili journalism and founder of Maithili Sahitya Parishad, Laheriasarai, appealed to George Abraham Grierson, who was living in England after his retirement from the Indian Civil Services, to help him revive "the dying Maithili culture” (letter cited in Jha 2013, p. 196). Das lamented that due to “serious misconception regarding this language and literature” (p. 196), prevalent mainly among the colonial officials and the intelligentsia, some officials continued to reject it as a dialect, notwithstanding Grierson’s assertion made in his various works, including his Linguistic Survey (1903), Grammar (1881)and “A Plea for the People’s Tongue”(1880), that Maithili is not a dialect but a language. Questions of misconception, omission, exclusion, marginalization, dialectization, and above all misidentification are central to the examination of the history of the Maithili language and literature. The classification of Maithili as a dialect of either Bengali or Hindi continued in post-Independence period as well, not only in various Census reports but also in an institution like Sahitya Akademi till 1965, when Maithili was eventually accorded the status of a distinct modern Indian language. ....................."
