= Asif Ahmad (politician) =

Indian politician

Member of the Bihar Legislative Assembly
- Incumbent
- Assumed office 14 November 2025
- Preceded by: Haribhushan Thakur Bachaul
- Constituency: Bisfi Assembly constituency

Personal details
- Party: Rashtriya Janata Dal
- Occupation: Politician

Asif Ahmad is an Indian politician from Bihar, currently serving as the Member of the Legislative Assembly from Bisfi. He was elected to the Bihar Legislative Assembly from the Bisfi Assembly constituency in the 2025 state elections as a candidate of the Rashtriya Janata Dal. He defeated outgoing MLA Haribhushan Thakur Bachaul by a margin of 8,107 votes, securing 1,00,771 votes against Haribhushan's 92,664.
