= Jagdish Narayan Brahmacharya Ashram =

Sanskrit ashram in Mithila

- जगदीश नारायण ब्रह्मचर्य आश्रम
- Interactive map of Jagdish Narayan Brahmacharya Ashram

Monastery information
- Other name: Brahmacharya Ashram
- Established: 1963
- Dedication: Vedic learning

People
- Founder: Jagdish Narayan Brahmacharya

Site
- Location: Lagma village, Tardeeh block, Darbhanga district
- Country: India
- Coordinates: 26.1855147°N 86.2417105°E

Jagdish Narayan Brahmacharya Ashram (Maithili: जगदीश नारायण ब्रह्मचर्य आश्रम) is a traditional Vedic gurukul in the Mithila region of Bihar in India. It is located at Lagma village in the Tardeeh block of the Darbhanga district in Bihar. It is known for imparting traditional Vedic education to Batuka in the region. The ashram holds three Sanskrit education institutions in the campus. The ashram was established in the year 1963 by a Vedic scholar named Jagdish Narayan Brahmacharya. It is also known as Brahmacharya Ashram.
