= Sanskrit and Vedic learning =

Indian tradition of the study and transmission of Vedic and post-Vedic texts

Education in India
Vedic Parishad

General details
- Primary languages: Sanskrit
- System type: Gurukula
- Established: Vedic period

Sanskrit learning, also called Brahminic learning, Sanskrit education, and Sanskrit culture, is the traditional study and transmission of Indian religious and secular knowledge preserved in Sanskrit texts. Vedic learning is specifically the tradition of oral transmission and learning by heart of the Vedic mantras as preserved in the Vedas and the post-Vedic smriti and shastra, and auxiliary traditions (vedanga) which concern the proper understanding and interpretation of Sanskrit, and the proper execution of the Vedic rituals.

== Etymology and context ==
"Sanskrit learning" is a broad category, referring to the study and transmission of religious and secular knowledge preserved in Sanskrit texts. "Vedic learning" concerns the correct recitation, and the understanding of their sacred meaning, of the Vedic mantras, liturgical hymns of the Vedic people. These were composed in the early Vedic period (ca. 1500–900 BCE) by the Vedic people, and expanded with a vast corpus of explanatory and philosophical texts in the late Vedic period (900–500 BCE). Vedanga are six auxiliary disciplines of Vedic studies, namely phonetics, meter, grammar, etymology, ritual instructions, and astrology.

Through the process of Sanskritization, and the production of formal exegetical commentaries (sastras), a broad range of non-Vedic religious traditions were incorporated into the Brahmanical fold, resulting in the Hindu synthesis. This synthesis developed around the beginning of the Common Era, but continued afterwards, as for example in Kashmir Shaivism.

== Modes of learning ==
=== Svādhyāya ===
Svādhyāya refers to the practice of self-study or self-introspection of the Vedas and other sacred texts, often involving recitation, repetition, reflection, and mantra practice, without the requirement of a teacher or institution.

=== Pathashala ===
In a pathasala, children are taught in Sanskrit by Brahmins. In India, the term pathasala has become synonymous with the term vidyalaya which refers to school. Before British rule, along with gurukulas, pathasalas served as primary educational institutions in India. Pathasalas were non-residential in nature, where as gurukalas were residential.

=== Shakha ===
A Shakha is specifically a Hindu theological school that specialises in learning certain Vedic texts, or else the traditional texts followed by such a school.

=== Gurukula ===
A student's training began with the upanayana ritual, traditionally performed between four and nine years of age by an acharya, marking the admittance of a student into Gurukula. A gurukula is the household of a teacher (acharya), where young Brahmins studied the Vedic texts and traditions with their teacher. They had to leave their old names and paternity recognitions, and were given new names and recognitions according to the lineage of the Gurukul. After the upanayana ritual, the students were supposed to maintain strict celibacy, which was helpful in controlling the senses and the mind. The Acharya took care of his students like a father, and imparted proper education, training and guidance to them. The students had to study in the Gurukula for minimum of 12 years. The daily routine consisted of bathing, Yajna, Poojan, Bhiksha (going out for alms), serving the Guru (teacher ), reading Vedas.

Some major examples of the Gurukul were Yajnavalkya Ashram, Kapil Ashram, Gautam Ashram, Pundrik Ashram, Shaunaka Mahashala Vishwamitra Ashram, Shandilya Ashram, and Vyasa Peetha.

=== Major centres of learning ===
Major important centres of Sanskrit and Vedic learning were Taxila, Sharada Peeth, Kashi, Mithila and Nabadwip, and a number of centres in South India.

=== Curriculum ===
According to Singh, citing Sukul (1974), Varanasi Down the Ages,

During eleventh and twelfth centuries A.D. Sanskrit education at Varanasi was divided into two sections. In traditional Vedic pathashala special knowledge of Vedas, sahitya, vyakaran, philosophy, Nyaya, Mimansa, Sankhya, Yoga, Vedanta Vaisheshika, and astronomy and astrology or Ayurveda was given. In other pathshalas students were taught eighteen sippas or arts.

== Decline and resurgence ==
During British Raj, British education became firmly established in India with the founding of missionary schools during the 1820s. As a result of decades of lobbying by figures such as William Wilberforce and Charles Grant, the 1813 renewal of East India Company's charter included a duty to educate the population and allowed previously excluded Christian missionaries to aid in this endeavour, in addition to the Company's corporate activities. The Company's officers were divided on how to implement this mandate. Orientalists believed education should be conducted in Indian languages, favouring classical or court languages like Sanskrit and Persian. On the other hand, utilitarians (also known as anglicists), such as Lord William Bentinck and Thomas Macaulay, argued that India had little to offer in terms of modern skills, and they advocated for education in English. Macaulay proposed an educational approach—now known as Macaulayism—that aimed to create a class of anglicised Indians who would serve as cultural intermediaries between the British and the Indian populace. What came to be known as the princely states also approached the question of English education from their own perspective, as some of them saw in it the opportunity to learn how to deal with the British threat.

Sir Thomas Munro critiqued the funding and teacher quality in the traditional education system. He noted that, due to the low earnings of teachers—no more than 6 or 7 Rupees monthly from fees of 4 to 8 Annas per pupil—the quality of teaching was lacking. Munro suggested that the East India Company (EIC) fund the construction of new schools, provide textbooks, and offer a stipend of 9 to 15 Rupees to teachers in the new schools to supplement their incomes from tuition fees in the Madras Presidency. After the introduction of Western-style education, the number of these indigenous educational institutions began to decline significantly. The Provincial Government was criticised for subsidising the education of pupils in the government-supported schools at Rs 15 per year, while indigenous schools charged only one Rupee per pupil.

Macaulay succeeded in establishing English as the administrative language through the English Education Act 1835, which also established English as the medium of instruction and promoted the training of English-speaking Indians as teachers. He was inspired by utilitarian ideas and advocated for what he referred to as "useful learning." Macaulay held Western culture in high esteem, and was dismissive of Indian culture, which he perceived as stagnant and something which had fallen well behind mainstream European scientific and philosophical thought. He once claimed that:

A single shelf of a good European library was worth the whole native literature of India and Arabia.

Essentially, Macaulay saw his undertaking as a "civilising mission":

We must at present do our best to form a class who may be interpreters between us and the millions whom we govern; a class of persons, Indian in blood and colour, but English in taste, in opinions, in morals, and in intellect. To that class we may leave it to refine the vernacular dialects of the country, to enrich those dialects with terms of science borrowed from the Western nomenclature, and to render them by degrees fit vehicles for conveying knowledge to the great mass of the population.

Since the second half of the 20th century, Nationalists in India have criticised Macaulay's views on Hinduism and Indian culture at large, which they claim skewed his educational policies.

Speaking at a national seminar on "Decolonising English Education" in 2001, professor Kapil Kapoor of Jawaharlal Nehru University highlighted that mainstream English-language education in India today has tended to "marginalise inherited learning" and uproot academics from traditional 'Indian modes of thought', inducing in them "a spirit of self-denigration (ISO: hīnabhāvanā )." Many Indian nationalists have criticised Macaulayism, claiming that it uprooted Indian traditions in sectors such as finance and replaced them with a foreign system which was wholly unsuited to India. In addition, they claim that Macaulayism caused foreign systems of thought to become prioritised over Indian systems of thought, particularly Hindu systems of thought.

Sheldon Pollock in his work The Death of Sanskrit attributes the decline of Sanskrit purely on perceived prestige of western language, culture, and education system by Indians.

== See also ==
- Gautam Ashram
- Svādhyāya
- Vedic chant
- Vedic Parishad
- Yajnavalkya Ashram

== Sources ==
- Mookerji, Radha Kumud (1947). Ancient Indian education Brahmanical and Buddhist. London: Macmillan and Co.
- Sharma, Ram Nath; Sharma, Rajendra Kumar (1996). History of Education in India. Atlantic Publishers & Dist. ISBN 978-81-7156-599-3.
- Singh, Chandra Prakesh (2017). "Educational System of Kashi: From Vedic period to the Beginning of the Modern Era" (PDF). Indian J. Soc. & Pol. 04(01):2017: 97-100.
- Vaidik, Aparna (2021). Waiting for Swaraj: Inner Lives of Indian Revolutionaries. Cambridge University Press.
