= Ugna Mahadev, Bhawanipur =

Hindu temple in India

Ugna Mahadev Mandir

Religion
- Affiliation: Hinduism
- District: Madhubani district
- Deity: Ugna Mahadev

Location
- Location: Bhawanipur
- State: Bihar
- Country: India

Ugna Mahadev Mandir is a Hindu temple in Bhawanipur village of Madhubani district in the Mithila region of Bihar in India. The temple is located at 14 km from Madhubani and 180 km away from Patna. It is believed to be the place where Lord Shiva showed his original form to the Maithili Mahakavi Vidyapati. Ugna was incarnation of Lord Shiva as a servant of his favorite devotee and great Maithili poet Vidyapati.

== See also ==
- Mithila
- Darbhanga
