= Bhairava Ugna Mahadev Mandir =

Ugna Mahadev Mandir, Bhairava
- उगना महादेव मंदिर, भैरवा

Religion
- Affiliation: Hinduism
- District: Madhubani district
- Deity: Lord Shiva
- Festival: Sambari Savan, Mahashivratri

Location
- Location: Bhairava Dham, Bisfi block, Madhubani district
- State: Bihar
- Country: India
- Lord Shiva temple dedicated to Ugna incarnation

Bhairava Ugna Mahadev Mandir (Maithili: भैरवा उगना महादेव मंदिर) is a Hindu temple of Lord Shiva at Bhairava village in Madhubani district of the Mithila region in Bihar. This temple is devoted to the Ugna incarnation of Lord Shiva.

== Description ==
The location of the temple is known as Bhairava Dham. During Savan Sombari, huge devotees of Lord Shiva come here to worship and Jalabhisheka on the Shivlinga of the Ugna Mahadev Mandir. The devotees carry holy water from the nearby Dhouns River of Balha Ghat and do Jalabhisheka on the Shivlinga of Bhairava Dham and pray to Ugna Mahadev there. Apart from the festival of Savan Sombari, the temple is popular for organising the festivals of Mahashivratri and Naraka Niwaran Chaturdashi.
