= Dullipatti =

- Village
- Location in Bihar, India
- Coordinates: 26.559°N 86.106°E
- Country: India
- State: Bihar
- Region: Mithila region
- District: Madhubani district
- Tehsil: Jainagar
- Demonym: Maithil

Languages
  - Official: Maithili, Hindi
- Time zone: UTC+5:30 (IST)
- PIN: 847226
- Telephone code: +91-6246
- ISO 3166 code: IN-BR
- Vehicle registration: BR-32
- Lok Sabha constituency: Madhubani
- Website: www.dullipatti.com

Dullipatti is a village, situated in Madhubani district of Bihar, near the Nepal international border. National Highway 105 passes through this village and is 6 kilometers away from Jainagar, sub-division.

As part of Mithilanchal, Maithili is a primary language of the villagers and Hindi is an official language.

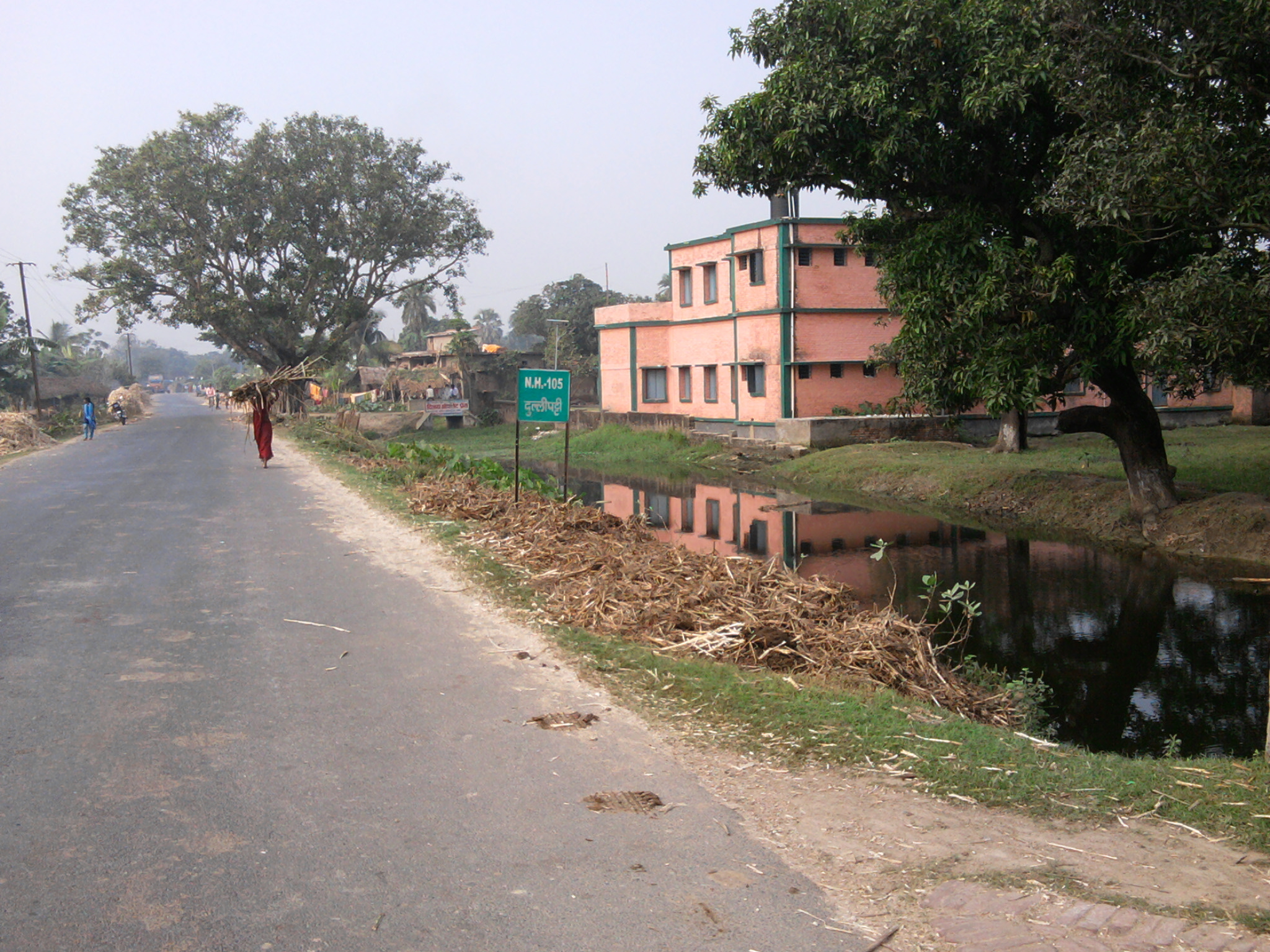
National Highway 105, passing through Dulipatti Village

== Culture ==
Villagers belong to different castes and communities. Several types of festivals are celebrated, including Diwali, Chhath, Eid, and Durga Puja.

== Education ==
This village has two government elementary schools, one government secondary school with a girls hostel facility and one government College D.B. College, LNMU. Beside government schools, there are also privately operated schools.

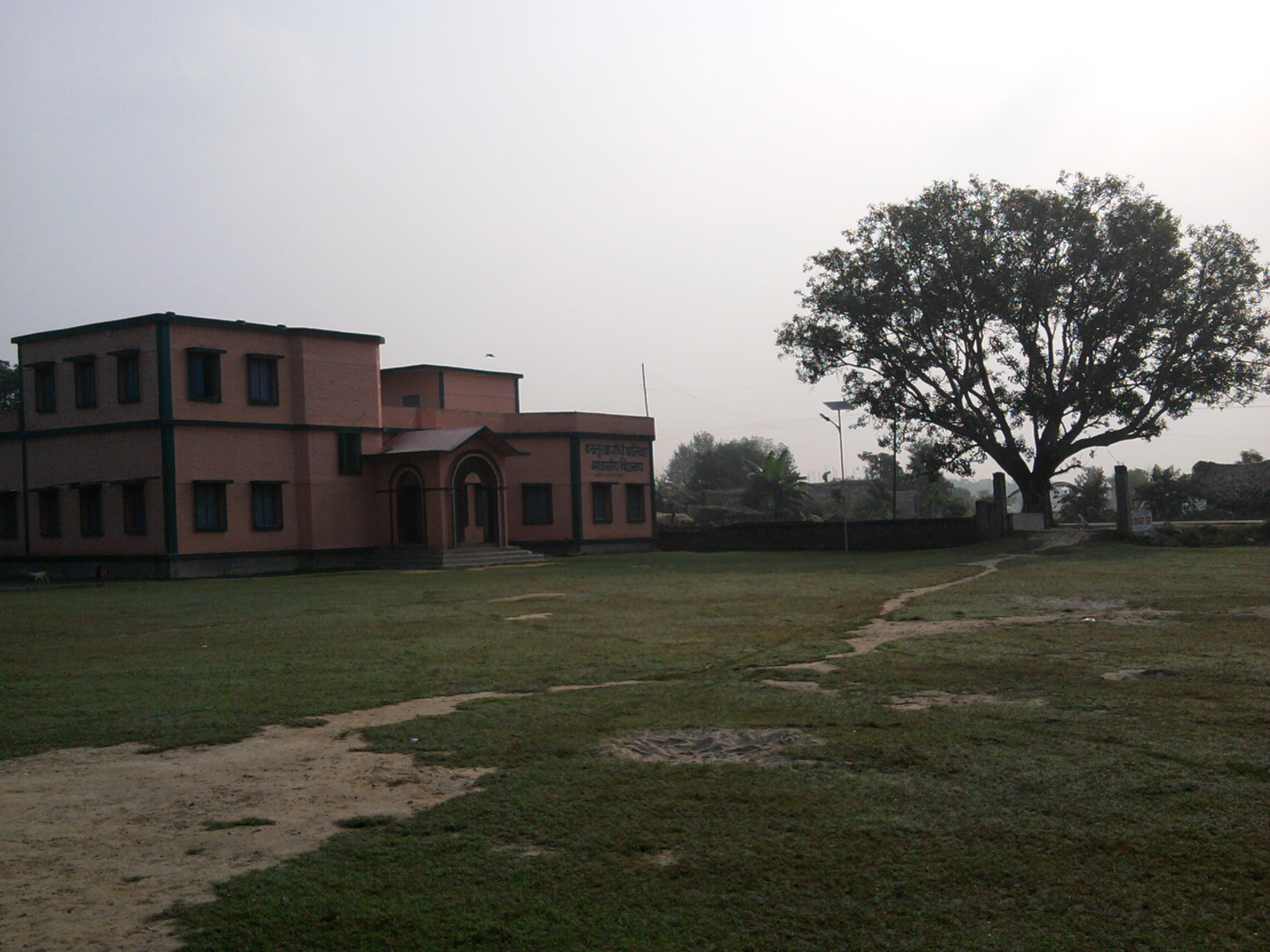
Girls Hostel for Government Secondary School, Dullipatti

== Banks ==
Dullipatti has branches of government banks like Grameen Bank and Indian Overseas Bank.

== Energy ==
Electricity supply is good and operated by the Bihar Electricity Board. In case of non-supply of electricity, people use generators to produce it.

== Migration ==
Like other villages of Bihar, some of the people of this village have also migrated to other states, like Delhi, Haryana or Panjab for earning a livelihood. However, due to better job opportunities at home, people are returning.

== Business ==
Agriculture is the main business of this villagers. All type of foods (wheat, rice, corn, pulse, sugar cane etc.) are being produced without using any dangerous fertilizers due to cultivated land.

== Market ==
There is a small market located in the center of the village. The larger village of Jainagar is also close to Dullipatti, providing more shopping opportunities.

== Road and transport ==
Highway (NH-105) that connects this village directly to the main city of the state like Madhubani, Darbhanga, Muzaffarpur and Patna. Buses of Delux and Semi-delux type run through.

== Railway connectivity ==
The Jaynagar railway station is close to this village and can be reached either by personal vehicles or by public transport. There are many JYG trains that depart from this station, to different places of state and country, including Delhi and Calcutta.

== Administration ==
Mrs. Rupam Kumari (Village Mukhiya) are democratically elected representative, takes care of all types of development work in the village.
