= Jagban =

Village in Bihar, India

Jagban Jagwan
- Rural
- Jagban East Gram Panchyat and Jagban West Gram Panchyat
- Nickname: Joge-Van
- Interactive map of Jagban
- Coordinates: 26.3569274°N 85.8325757°E
- State: Bihar
- District: Madhubani
- Block: Bisfi
- Country: India
- Named for: Yajnavalkya
- Panchayat: Gram Panchyat Raj

Government
  - Type: Mukhiya
  - Body: Panchayati raj

Population
  - Total: 10,744
- India Population Census 2011
- Demonym: Maithil

Languages
  - Official language: Mother language: Hindi; Maithili
- Postal Pin Code: 847304
- Village of the Indian Philosopher Yajnavalkya

Jagban also known as Joge-Van is a village in the Mithila region of Bihar. It is believed to be the Tapobhumi of the Vedic sage Yajnavalkya. The village is located in Bisfi block of Madhubani district in India. It is around five kilometres distance by road from Kamtaul railway station of the East Central Railway. The village is divided into two Gram Panchyats, they are Jagban East and Jagban West.

== Demographics ==
As of 2011, the number of families residing in this village is 2,346. The total population of the village is 10,744, of which 5,741 are male while 5,003 are females. The sex ratio of Jagban village is 871 females to 1000 males on average. Among children, this ratio is on average 884 females to every 1000 males. In 2011, the literacy rate of Jagban village was 39.3%, with literacy among males at 46.99% and 30.39% among females.

== Religious significance ==
Jagban village is believed to be the residence place of the Vedic sage Yajnavalkya. It is believed that the sage Yajnavalkya did his tough penance devoted to Lord Suryanarayana in this village. In the Jagban West Panchayat of the village there is an ancient place related to the sage, known as Yajnavalkya Ashram. According to legend, Yajnavalkya founded his treatises Satapatha Brahmana, Brihadaranyaka Upanishad and Shukla Yajurveda, etc. at this village. On the occasion of Yajnavalkya Janmoshtav, huge devotees gather here for paying tributes to the Vedic sage Yajnavalkya. There is a temple called as Shree Yogeshwar Yajnavalkya Mandir in the campus of the Yajnavalkya Ashram, built in the memory of Yajnavalkya.
