= Alpura =

Alpura may refer to:

- Alpura (company), a Mexican dairy company
- Alpura, Madhubani, a village located in India
