= Faiyaz Ahmad =

Indian politician

Dr. Faiyaz Ahmad

Member of Parliament, Rajya Sabha
- Incumbent
- Assumed office 8 July 2022
- Preceded by: Sharad Yadav
- Constituency: Bihar

Member of the Bihar Legislative Assembly
- In office 2010–2020
- Preceded by: Haribhushan Thakur
- Succeeded by: Haribhushan Thakur
- Constituency: Bisfi

Personal details
- Born: Chandersenpur, Madhubani, Bihar
- Party: Rashtriya Janata Dal
- Parent: Qamruzzama (father)
- Education: Lalit Narayan Mithila University

Faiyaz Ahmad is an Indian politician belonging to Rashtriya Janata Dal, he is member of the Rajya Sabha from Bihar since May 2022. He had been elected two consecutive terms as a Member of Bihar Legislative Assembly from Bisfi 2010 and 2015. He is an educationist and founder of Madhubani Medical College and Hospital. The Rashtriya Janata Dal (RJD) announced Faiyaz Ahmad as the party's candidate for the upcoming Rajya Sabha elections.
