= Mangrauni =

- Village
- Location of Mangrauni Mangrauni (India)
- Country: India
- State: Bihar
- Region: Mithila
- District: Madhubani

Population
  - Total: 16,533

Mangrauni is a village in Madhubani district, Bihar, India with a population of 16,533. The village is in the Rajnagar Vidhan Sabha constituency and the local language is Maithili. The last queen Maharani Kamasundari Devi of the Raj Darbhanga in Mithila was born in this village as the fourth daughter of Pandit Hansmani Jha. Similarly, the Maithili poet Lalkavi was the resident of the village.

In ancient time, the name of Mangrauni was “Mangalwani” that means “The place of blessings” or “The place of worshippers".

Village is well connected to city Madhubani with 3-4 different routes. The least distant route between Mangrauni and Madhubani is 2 Kilometres.

From ancient time, Mangrauni is well known for devotion, temples and astrology. Maa Bhagwati Temple called Budhi Mata Mandir is in centre of village having religious significance across whole Madhubani.

Another world famous temple is Baba Ekadash Rudra Mandir, In “Ekadasha Rudra” temple, there is eleven Shivlings having the eleven forms of shiva – Mahadev, Shiva, Rudra, Shankar, Neel, Lohit, Ishaan, Vijay, Bheem, Bhavodev, and Kapali, donated by the zamindar of Mangrauni, Babu Jagdish Nandan Singh.This unique temple was made by the famous enchanter Late Pundit Muneeshwar Jha in 1946.

Village is well rooted with education. three Primary Schools, one secondary and higher secondary school, run by Government of Bihar is there. Apart from that, many private schools and coaching centre is established in recent times. Mangrauni also has a public library called Gandhi Pustakalya.

It has one heart hospital, inaugurated by CM Nitish Kumar. The land for this hospital was also given by Babu Jagdish Nandan Singh.

Most of the Mangrauni was ruled by Babu Jagdish Nandan Singh as a zamindar.

Mangrauni also produced one Education Minister to Bihar during the period of CM Bindeshwari Dubey. He was Lokesh Nath Jha.

Today, Mangrauni is known for its art and crafts. Many people are working at renowned positions in the government of India and Bihar.
