= Vedic Parishad =

Council of Learned Brahmins in Ancient India

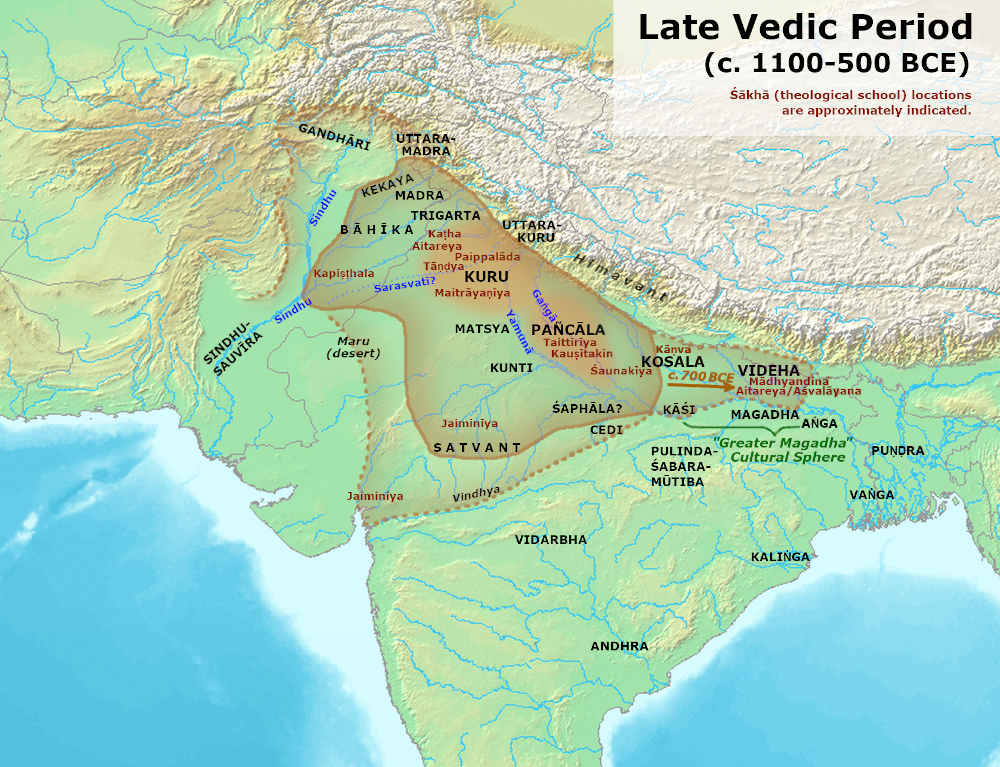
The spread of the Vedic culture in the late Vedic period.

Vedic Parishad or Parishad ( Sanskrit: परिषद ) was a council of learned Brahmins and scholars in ancient India. It is also known as Brahmasabhā. The Vedic Parishad was headed by a chief judge. The chief judge was called as Dharmādhikārin. It was often a kind of religious court in Vedic and Brahmanical period. It was the sovereign assembly to the meeting of learned Brahmins for discussion and debate between the scholars. According to R K Mukherjee, the Parishad resembles with the university of students belonging to various colleges. Parishad represents conducting debates under the chairmanship of its president. In ancient times, Parishad was the assembly of learned Sanskrit and Vedic scholars called by the king to decide on the subjects of Vedas, Vedanga, Dharmashastra, religion etc. The decision taken by the Parishad was universal.

== Etymology ==
Parishad or pariṣad is made of two Sanskrit words Pari and Sad. The word Pari means around and Sad means sit. Therefore, Parishad means sit around. Parishad denotes an assembly or a council. The Brihadaranyaka Upanishad mentions Parishads which were Vidyapeethas and in which many students gathered.

== Description ==
According to Parâsara four, or even three learned Brahmins in a village, who know the Vedas and keep the sacrificial fire, form a Parishad. There are references of Pariṣad in Chhandogya and Brihadaranyaka Upanishads where discussion of metaphysical subjects of Atman and Brahman were organised. In Chhandogya Upanishad there is reference of scholar Svetaketu who went to Panchal Parishad for learning. According to Kautilya, Tantra-Yukti was compiled by systematic debates in the Parishad of learned Brahmins possibly in the 6th century BC. Tantra-Yukti literary means "scientific argument". According to the Vedic sage Gautama, there should be minimum ten members in the Parishad. The minimum ten members of the Parishad should be composed by four scholars who were completely learned in the four Vedas, three from the society which includes a student, a householder and an ascetic and three members from the three different institutes of law.

== Important Vedic Parishads ==
Kashi, Mithila, Kosala, Kuru, Panchal, Pravahana Jaivali's palace, Kekaya Aswapthi's sabha, Mahasala of Sounaka, Yajnavalkya Ashram in North India, PathanjalaKapya's gurukula, Bhrighu's and Dathathreya's schools in South India were some important centres of the Vedic Parishad. The seat of Vedic Parishads were either at the court of kings in their respective kingdoms or at the Ashramas of the great philosophers in the respective kingdoms of the Indian Subcontinent.
