= Chanpura =

Village of Madhubani district in Bihar

- Village
- Chanpura
- Interactive map of Chanpura
- Country: India
- State: Bihar
- Region: Mithila
- Division (Commissionary): Darbhanga
- District: Madhubani
- Sub division: Benipatti
- Block: Benipatti

Population (2011)
  - Total: 1,813
- Demonym: Maithil

Language
  - Official: Hindi

Region languages
  - Mother tongue: Ancient: Maithili; Sanskrit

Chanpura is a village in the Mithila region of Bihar in India. It is located in the Benipatti block of the Madhubani district in Bihar. The village holds Krishi Vigyan Kendra in the region. The village is situated near the Basaitha village.

== Description ==
The village of Chanpura is situated in a flood prone area. In the year 1975, the Yoga Guru Swami Dhirendra Brahmachari, a resident of the village, started an initiative to construct a flood protection ring dam around the village. After his initiative, it was constructed around the village.The length of the flood protection ring dam around the Chanpura village is of eight kilometres.

Dhirendra Brahmachari of the village was a very prominent personality in Yoga teachings. He was the yoga guru of the then Indian prime minister Indira Gandhi.

Similarly, Chan Chaudhary of the village was an important personality, who led the construction of the present temple at the legendary place Gandiveshwar Sthan in the Shivanagar village of the Benipatti sub-division.

== Demographics ==
According to the population census 2011, the total population of village is 1813 and the number of households is 352.
