= Dharmaraj (Kuldevta) =

Kuldevta Dharmaraj of Maithils

- Other names: Baba Dharmaraj or Dharmaraj Baba
- धर्मराज: Devanagari
- Associate: Kuldevta
- Region: Mithila
- Ethnic group: Maithils
- Temples: Gosaunik Ghar; Dharmaraj Baba Mandir, Chahuta
- Festivals: Ghari Puja; Dharmaraj Baba Utsav Puja

In the Mithila region, Dharmaraj refers to a Kuldevta of some Maithil families in the Indian subcontinent. He is also called as Baba Dharmaraj or Dharmaraj Baba. He is a family deity of some clans of Maithil communities. He is associated with the folklore traditions in the region. The seat of the Kuldevta is established in a special worship room known as Gosaunik Ghar of the family. There is a festival known as Ghari Puja to celebrate the annual grand Puja of the Kuldevta Dharmaraj. In some villages, he is considered as a deity of Gramdevta or Brahma Sthan.

The Kuldevta Dharmaraj is described and praised through Maithili lokagita (folk songs) known as Dharmaraj Geet. In these songs, symbolism is also found. He is worshipped by making an iconic physical seat known as sira or pirhi at the Gosaunik Ghar. The sira or pirhi of the Kuldevta is made of mud and it is symbolic representation of the Kuldevta. The mud used for making the sira or pirhi of the Kuldevta is brought from some sacred sources such as Ganga river. Even the seat of the Kuldevta Dharmaraj is generally established at the Gosaunik Ghar of the Maithil families, but in some villages of the region some separate temples dedicated to Dharmaraj Baba are also established. In these temples, the devotees of the village and its neighbour villages also flock to worship the deity.

In the Chahuta village of the Madhubani district, there is a very popular temple dedicated to Dharmaraj Baba. It is known as Dharmaraj Baba Mandir. During the festival dedicated to him, a large numbers of devotees from entire region of Mithila along with Nepal flock to the temple for participating in the worship of the deity.

According to the Pauranika point of view, Dharmaraj and Yamraj are one and the same. But according to the folklore in Mithila, the Kuldevta Dharmaraj is considered as the incarnation of Lord Yamraj. In the epic Mahabharata, the Pandava King Yudhishthira is mentioned as an anshavtar (partial incarnation) of Lord Yamraj. Therefore, Yudhishthira is also called Dharmaraj, as being the anshavtar of Yamraj.

== Etymology ==
Dharmaraj is a compound Sanskrit word having two Indic terms Dharma and Raj. The literal meaning of the term Dharma is righteousness and that of Raj is rule or a kingdom. Thus the literal meaning of the compound word Dharmaraj is the ruler of righteousness or a king that follows the principles of Dharma. In this regard, there is a part of a Vedic verse as

यो धर्मेण राजते स धर्मराजः ।

The verse translates as "He who shines forth through righteousness alone, is devoid of unrighteousness, and illuminates righteousness itself—for this reason, the name of the Supreme Lord is Dharmaraja."

== Offerings ==
The prasad or offerings to the Kuldevta Dharmaraj is known as Paatair. On auspicious days like Mundan, Kumaram of upanayana, and Maithil Vivah, the paatair is offered to the Kuldevta Dharmaraj. The paatair includes delicious kheer, sweet puri, malpua, laddoo, and dahi-chura, etc.

On the occasion of any auspicious ceremonies in the family, the Kuldevta Dharmaraj is first prayed and then some blessings are wished by the family members from him.

== Festivals ==
The main festival dedicated to the Kuldevta Dharmaraj is Ghari Puja. It is an annual festival for the worship of the Kuldevta. It is celebrated on the first Wednesday of the Shukla Paksha in the Hindu month of Shravan (Sraban). Similarly, the Dharmaraj Baba Utsav Puja is an other major festival celebrated at the Dharmaraj Baba Mandir in the village of Chahuta in the Madhubani district of the region.
