= Kamasundari Devi =

Last queen of Darbhanga Raj in Mithila

- Maharani
- Born: 22 October 1932; Mangrauni village, Madhubani district
- Died: 12 January 2026 (aged 93); Kalyani Niwas
Regnal name
- Maharani Kamasundari Devi
- Royal House: Raj Darbhanga
- Father: Pandit Hansmani Jha
- Religion: Hinduism
- Occupation: Queen

Kamasundari Devi (Maithili: कामसुंदरी देवी) was the last queen of the Raj Darbhanga in Mithila. She was the third queen of the last ruler King Kameshwar Singh of the Khandwala Dynasty in Mithila. She is popularly known for her donation of 600 kg gold to the Government of India during the war between India and China in 1962. Her regal name is Maharani Kamasundari Devi.

== Early life ==
Kamasundari was born on 22 October 1932 in a family of Maithil Brahmin in Mithila. She was the fourth daughter of Pandit Hansmani Jha in the Mangrauni village of the Madhubani district.

== Later life ==
In 1940, she was married to Maharaja Kameshwar Singh as his third wife. She was married at the age of 8 years. According to an other source, she was married on 5 May 1943. In 1962, Maharaja Kameshwar Singh died and consequently Maharani Kamasundari Devi became widow.

== Death ==
In September 2025, she slipped in her bathroom and got injured. After suffering a brain hemorrhage and later developing blood clots therefrom. She was admitted to ICU of a private hospital in the city of Darbhanga. But her health condition didn't recover and she died on 12 January 2026 at her residence Kalyani Niwas.
