= Dharmaraj Baba Mandir, Chahuta =

Hindu temple dedicated to Dharmaraj Baba in Mithila

Dharmaraj Baba Mandir
- धर्मराज बाबा मंदिर

Religion
- Affiliation: Hinduism
- District: Madhubani
- Deity: Dharmaraj Baba
- Festival: Dharmaraj Baba Utsav

Location
- Location: Chahuta, Mithila region
- State: Bihar
- Country: India
- Hindu temple dedicated to Dharmaraj Baba in Mithila; Dharmaraj Baba Utsav Puja date - First Sunday after Magha Vasant Panchami

Dharmaraj Baba Mandir ( Maithili: धर्मराज बाबा मंदिर ) or simply Dharmaraj Mandir at the Chahuta village is a Hindu temple dedicated to the deity Dharmaraj Baba in the Mithila region of the Indian subcontinent. It is situated in the Bisfi block of the Madhubani district in the state of Bihar in India. It a major temple in the region dedicated to Dharmaraj Baba. It is popular among the devotees of the region along with Nepal. The temple organises an annual festival dedicated to the deity Dharmaraj Baba, in which a large numbers of devotees flock from the both nations. It is organised every year on the first Sunday after the Magha Shri Vasant Panchami.
