= National Highway 227L (India) =

National Highway in India

National Highway 227L

Route information
- Auxiliary route of NH 27
- Length: 20.4 km (12.7 mi)

Major junctions
- North end: Umagaon
- South end: Kaluvahi

Location
- Country: India
- States: Bihar

Highway system
- Roads in India; Expressways; National; State; Asian
← NH 227	→ NH 527B

National Highway 227L, commonly referred to as NH 227L is a national highway in India. It is a secondary route of National Highway 27. NH-227L runs in the state of Bihar in India.

== Route ==
NH227L connects Umagaon, Basopatti and Kaluvahi in the state of Bihar.

== Junctions ==
NH 227 Terminal near Umagaon.
NH 527B Terminal near Kalnahi.

== See also ==
- List of national highways in India
- List of national highways in India by state
