= Bichkhana =

- Village
- Country: India
- State: Bihar
- Region: Mithila
- District: Madhubani
- Time zone: UTC+05:30 (IST)
- UN/LOCODE: INBR
- ISO 3166 code: IN-BR

Bichkhana is a village in Madhubani district, Bihar, India. It is 18 km west-north from the Madhubani railway station. The neighboring villages are Ektara, Jamuari, and Navkarhi. There is a small temple, "Hanuman Mandir", in the center of the village.

== Language ==
The primary language of Bichkhana is Maithili.

== Other information ==
- Block: Benipatti
- Police station: Anrer
- Post office: Ektara
- Lok sabha : Madhubani
- Vidhan Sabha: Benipatti
- Pin : 847222
