= Bisfi Vidyapati Dih =

Birth place of Maithili poet Vidyapati

- बिस्फी विद्यापति डीह
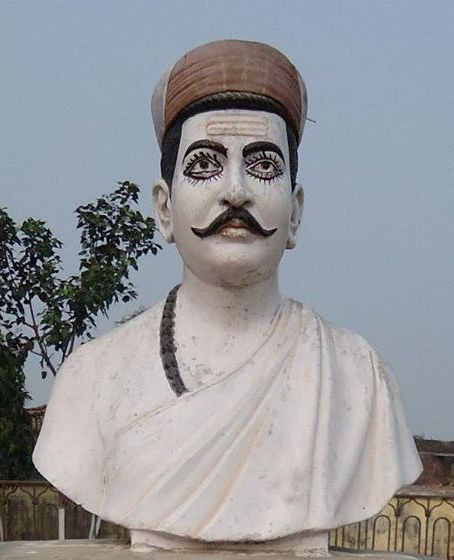
- Founder: Vidyapati
- Parent institution: Ancient Mithila University
- Religious affiliation: Sanatana
- Principal: Vidyapati
- Location: Bisfi village, Madhubani district, Bihar, India
- Campus: Rural

Bisfi Vidyapati Dih is the birthplace of Maithili poet Vidyapati in Mithila. It is located at Bisfi village of Madhubani district in Bihar. It was also an educational centre of the Ancient Mithila University. Vidyapati used to teach his students here. According to legend, Lord Shiva had incarnated here as Ugna, in the form of a poor servant at the courtyard of his great devotee Vidyapati. In 2024, the Bihar Government approved a budget of 20 crores for the development and beautification of the site.

== Description ==
There are Vidyapati's birthplace Dih, Vidyapati's academy, pond and Bhagwati Visveshwari Mata Sthan. It is said that King Shivasimha granted Vidyapati his home village of Bisafi which was recorded on a copper plate grant. This historical place is the heritage of Mithila.The ruins of his school have become his memorial monuments. In the 14th century, the poet raised the flame of education by building a school for the education of exploited, neglected and downtrodden children. Nowadays dead bodies are burnt here. Due to the neglect of politicians, the school turned into a crematorium. In 2018, a committee was constituted at the district level for its development on the standard of tourism. The committee demanded to display the pictures related to Vidyapati's work, personality and his couplets through wall writing at the ancient site. A delegation of the Global Maithil Samaj led by Pandit Kamalakant Jha, the representative of Vidyapati Seva Sansthan and former president of Maithili Academy, demanded Chief Minister Nitish Kumar to declare it as a national monument. It has been proposed to build a guest house and a grand entrance gate at the Bisfi Vidyapati Dih. A three-storied building has been proposed to be constructed parallel to the length of the memorial building on the western vacant land adjacent to the Vidyapati memorial building. It is proposed to develop a theater on the first floor, a library on the second floor and an auditorium on the third floor of the building. The work of fencing the pond from all sides and making fountains at various places is also proposed in the plan.

On 7 August 2024, the Standing Finance Committee of the Bihar Government approved a scheme budget of 20 crores for the development and beautification of the premises. The implementation of the scheme was entrusted to the Bihar State Tourism Development Corporation with estimated fund of amount Rs 19 crore 90 lakh 73 thousand.

== Proposed Grand Statue of Vidyapati ==
In 2014, Phul Singh, the chairman of Vidyapati Janjagran Trust proposed a grand statue of Vidyapati at the Bisfi Vidyapati Dih. The height of the statue will be 111 feet high. It will cost about Rs 4 crore. As the statue will be erected on the 16-feet-high mound, the actual height of the statue would be around 127 feet from the level plane of the village.
