= National Highway 227J (India) =

National Highway in India

National Highway 227J
- Map of National Highway 227J in red

Route information
- Auxiliary route of NH 27
- Length: 40 km (25 mi)

Major junctions
- North end: Saharghat
- South end: Rahika

Location
- Country: India
- States: Bihar

Highway system
- Roads in India; Expressways; National; State; Asian
← NH 227	→ NH 527B

National Highway 227J, commonly referred to as NH 227J is a national highway in India. It is a secondary route of National Highway 27. NH-227J runs in the state of Bihar in India.

== Route ==
NH227J connects Saharghat, Uchhait, Benipatti and Rahika in the state of Bihar.

== Junctions ==
NH 227 Terminal near Saharghat.
NH 527B Terminal near Rahika.

== See also ==
- List of national highways in India
- List of national highways in India by state
