= Mithila Haat =

Modern tourist destination in Mithila

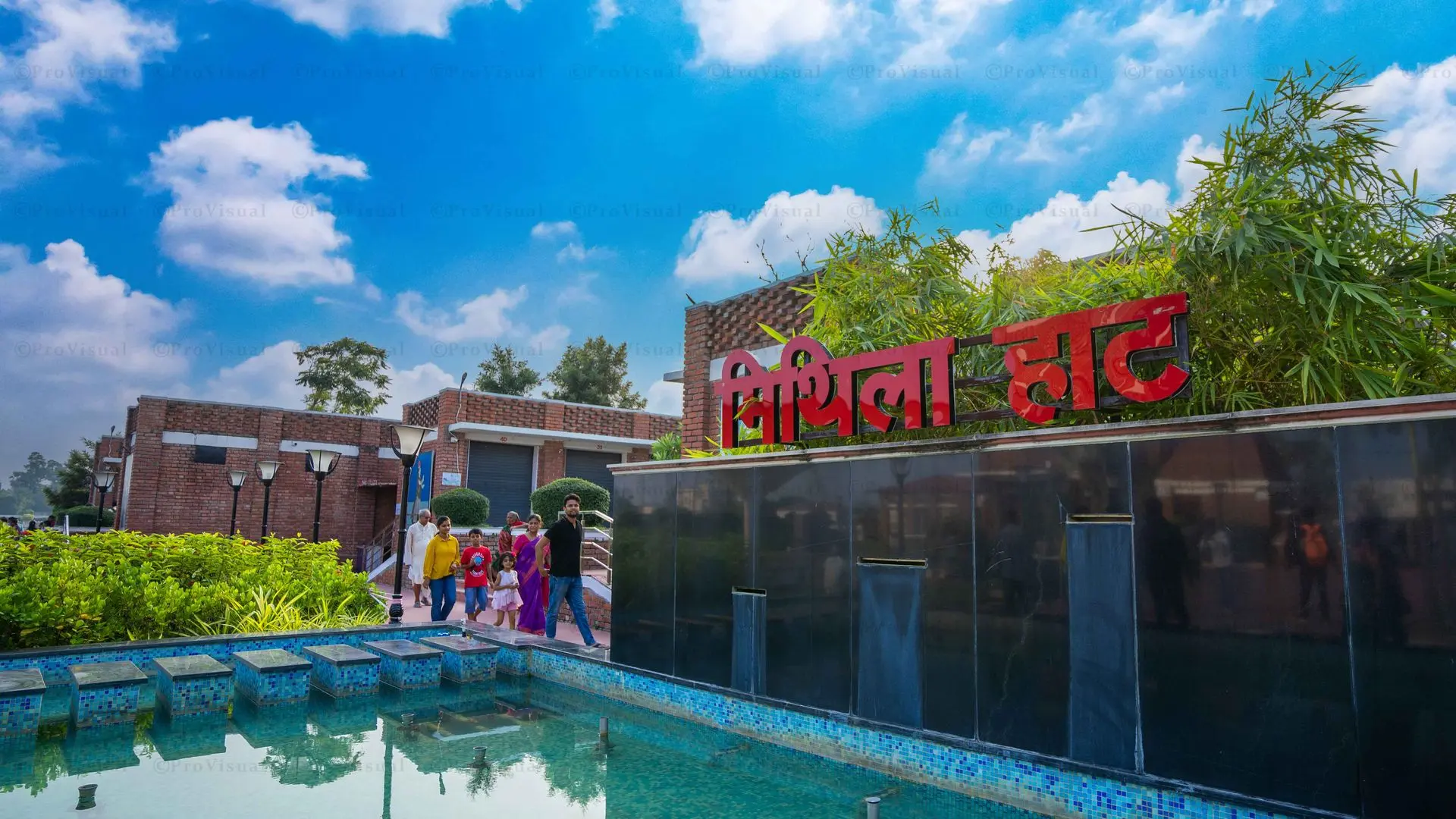
Mithila Haat

Mithila Haat (Maithili: मिथिला हाट) is a modern tourist complex in the Mithila region of India. It is located at Araria Sangram village in the Jhanjharpur block of the Madhubani district in Bihar. It was inaugurated on 11 January 2023 by the chief minister Nitish Kumar of the Bihar state in India. It is situated near National Highway 57 also called as East West Corridor. Tourists from all over the world come here to experience the art and culture of Mithila, such as Mithila painting, handicrafts, products made from Sikki grass and Khadi and the local Mithila cuisine etc.

== Etymology ==
The first term Mithila denotes the cultural region of the ancient Videha Kingdom in the Indian subcontinent. The second Maithili term Haat literally means a rural market or a rural shoping area. Thus the combined form Mithila Haat literally means a shoping area in a village.

== Description ==
The campus of the Mithila Haat is located on the western bank of the Sugarway river flowing through the village. In the campus there is a big pond known as Baraki Pokhair.

Bhansa Ghar is a traditional restaurant in the campus famous for traditional Maithil cuisine. In this restaurant tourists come to enjoy the taste of the traditional foods of the Mithila region.
