= Sugarway River =

Riverfront in Mithila

Sugarway river flows through the Jhanjharpur block in the Mithila region of Bihar. Araria Sangram is a village in the Jhanjharpur block. The Sugarway riverfront is constructed on the banks of both sides of the Sugarway river having length of four hundred meters each sides. It is near the famous tourist place Mithila Haat. The water flowing through the Sugarway river is also used for irrigation in farms near it by the farmers of the region.

== Riverfront ==
Sugarway Riverfront is a waterfront developed along the banks of Sugarway river at Araria Sangram in the Jhanjharpur block of Madhubani district in the Mithila region of Bihar, India. It is developed to enhance tourism in the Mithila region of Bihar. It is built by the Government of Bihar. It was inaugurated by the chief minister Nitish Kumar on 12 January 2025.
