= Umgaon =

Village of Bihar

- Interactive map of Umgaon
- Coordinates (Bazar Chowk, Umgaon): 26.6125218°N 85.9698331°E
- Country: India
- State: Bihar
- Region: Mithila region
- District: Madhubani district
- Government of Bihar: Gram Panchayat Raj

Government
  - Body: Panchayat samiti

Population (2011)Census of India
  - Total: 5,796
- Demonym: Maithil
- Postal Pincode: 847240

Umgaon is a historical village in the Mithila region of Bihar in India. It is located in the Harlakhi block of the Madhubani district. During the British rule in the Indian subcontinent, this village was known for the cultivation of Neel plants.

== History ==
The history of village can be traced from the period of the British rule in the subcontinent. According to the older residents of the village, there was an Englishman known as "Mister Alexander", who was running the factory of Neel products with his brother and sister during the British rule in the village. Those days the Umgaon village was the major centre for the cultivation and production of the Neel related products in the region.

The remains of ruins of the Neel factory still exist in the village. The ruins of the Neel factory is known as Umgaon Kothi also called as Neelha Kothi. The legacy of the Umgaon Kothi was preserved by naming the post of the village on its name. The post office of the Umgaon village is called as Umgaon Kothi whose postal pincode is 847240.

== Demographics ==
According to the Indian population census 2011, the total number of families residing in the village is 1,012. The total population of the village is 5,796. The number of males and females are 3,019 and 2,777 respectively out of the total population. The average sex ratio of the village is 920.
