= Mahadeva Meteorite =

Meteorite found at Madhubani district in Mithila region

- Type: Chondrite
- Class: H chondrite
- Composition: Iron (Fe), silica (SiO2), chondrules, Metal and Metals Alloy
- Country: India
- Region: Mithila
- Coordinates: 26°28′56.28″N 86°35′53.17″E
- Alternative names: Mahadeva Chondrite

The Mahadeva Meteorite (Maithili: महादेव उल्कापिंड), also known as Mahadeva Chondrite or simply Mahadeva, is a meteorite that fell at Mahadeva village of Laukahi block, Madhubani district in the Mithila region of Bihar, India. It fell on 22 July 2019 at a farm in the village, at the coordinates 26°28'56.28''N, 86°35'53.17''E.

== Etymology ==
Mahadeva Meteorite fell at a farm in Mahadeva village of the Madhubani district in India. The meteorite was named after the village where it fell.

== People observation and media reports ==
The Mahadeva Meteorite fell around 12 pm on Monday at day time. According to the witness farmers, the celestial object fell into the farm field with a loud noise and smoke started coming out. It penetrated the ground about six feet down. The sound of the stone falling was heard for miles. Due to fear farmers working in farms ran away from there when they saw the mysterious object slamming into the ground. When the smoke subsided, a young farmer dug the ground and found a black stone.

After that the local administrations were informed about the mysterious object. A local administration official found the object was attracting an magnet when it was brought near it. The news of the fall of the mysterious object spread around the villages and a large numbers of people flocked to see it.

After some time the then District Magistrate Shirsat Kapil Ashok took the mysterious stone under his control. He kept it under tight security and sent for further examination. Dr Shashi Bhushan Prasad, head of the Department of Geography, at Ram Krishna College, Madhubani informed that "Falling such a large stone is not a trivial matter. Only after looking at the stone and making a special study of it can anything be said".

After two days the mysterious stone was brought to the chief minister's residence at 1, Aney Marg in the state capital city Patna. The chief minister Nitish Kumar observed the mysterious object and inquired about it with the geologists brought at his residence. The geologists informed that the mysterious stone is a meteorite. They also informed that the mysterious object contains elements like iron ore, magnesium and olivine, etc. After that the chief minister Nitish Kumar ordered his officer to hand over the mysterious object to the Department of Science and Technology for further research. He also said that after the further research and examination of the mysterious object, it would be kept in the Bihar Museum for public.

== Scientific descriptions ==
The weight of the Mahadeva Meteorite is approximately 15 kg. It is classified as H-chondrite on the basis of the petrochemical studies by the scientists at Physical Research Laboratory, Ahmedabad. The meaning of the H chondrite is "high-iron ordinary chondrite".

The Mahadeva Meteorite is an ordinary chondrite. It contains "relict chondrules, small spherical, melt-textured objects which were formed during the early solar nebula". The size of the chondrules range from "a few hundred microns to more than two millimeters across". The meteorite is categorized as petrographic type 5/6. According to the study of mineral composition of the meteorite, it is inferred that the meteorite had experienced high temperatures of approximately 800°C.

The meteorite may provide new data on the processes of the Solar System during the early period.

== Institutions involved ==
The Mahadeva Meteorite is kept at the Bihar Museum, where it is preserved under the supervision of Sanjeev Kumar, Director of science and technology. Its small portion approximately 130 gm sample was sent to the Physical Research Laboratory in Ahmedabad. There, it was chemically and texturally characterized. The financial support for the project of the study and research was assisted by the Department of Space, Government of India.
