= Ugna Mahadev =

Incarnation of Lord Shiva in Mithila

Ugna
- Other names: Ugna
- Era: 14th Century CE

Ugna or Ugna Mahadev (उगना महादेव) is believed to be an incarnation of Shiva as the servant of his devotee, the Maithili poet Vidyapati around the 14th century in Mithila. According to legend, the people of Mithila generally remember and worship Shiva by the name of Ugna, which is among the deity's thousand names.

== Legend ==
It is believed that Shiva was so pleased and fascinated with the devotion of Vidyapati to him, he decided to meet the poet on the earth in human incarnation as Ugna. Shiva took the incarnation in human being wearing custum like servant. He reached the house of the poet Vidyapati in search of jobs. He met the poet and asked for job at his home. But Vidyapati was not so prosperous by wealth to provide job for him. Then Ugna agreed to work at the poet house on cost of two times daily food. Once a time Vidyapati was going to the king Shiv Singh court for meeting with the king in a very hot summer, then he felt very thirsty for water and asked Ugna to bring some water. Ugna went few distances out of the sight of Vidyapati and full his lota with water from the Ganga from his jatta. Then he came back to Vidyapati and give the full lota of water to the poet to drink the water. When Vidyapati drank the water, he recognised the taste of the water as from the Ganga. After drinking the water, Vidyapati looked around at a far distance in search of the source of the water but he found no such source of water around him and he astonished. Then he asked Ugna to show the source of water but Ugna was unable to show the source of the water. Then Vidyapati prayed to Ugna and asked him to clearify his true identity. After many appeals from Vidyapati Ugna finally showed his true identity as Shiva. Then Shiva asked Vidyapati to promise him not to reveal his true identity to anyone and Vidyapati agreed to not reveal his true identity to anyone. But one day the wife of the poet was very angry with Ugna and tried to beat him by burning wood. Vidyapati saw this incident and suddenly revealed the true identity of Ugna to stop his wife from beating him by the burning wood. And then Ugna showing his true identity disappeared from there forever.

== Related places ==
- Ugna Mahadev Mandir, Bhavanipur: It is said that, Ugna appeared in the form Shiva in front of Vidyapati at Bhavanipur village of Madhubani district in Mithila region of Bihar.
- Bisfi Vidyapati Dih, Madhubani: Similarly it is believed that Shiva took the incarnation of Ugna at Bisfi village of Madhubani district in Mithila region of Bihar. It is also the birthplace of Vidyapati.
