= Gandiveshwar Sthan =

Site in the Hindu epic Mahabharata

- गांडिवेश्वर स्थान

Religion
- Affiliation: Hinduism
- District: Madhubani district
- Deity: Lord Shiva
- Festival: Mahashivratri

Location
- Location: Shivnagar Village, Benipatti sub-division, Mithila region
- State: Bihar
- Country: India
- Interactive map of Gandiveshwar Sthan
- Coordinates: 26.4273872°N 85.7981238°E

Architecture
- Type: Tirhut style

Gandiveshwar Sthan (गांडीवेश्वर स्थान) is a place mentioned in the Hindu history the Mahabharata and a religious tourist centre for Hindu pilgrims. In the Mahabharata, when the Pandavas were exiled from their kingdom to the forest by the Kauravas, Arjuna hid his Gandiva bow and all his weapons under a shami tree, which adherents believe is at this site.

== Description ==
According to legend, Arjuna got his weapon Pashupati Astra here by meditating to Shiva. He placed a Shivalinga here, which is believed to be at the temple called the Gandiveshwar Nath Mahadev Mandir. This place is located at Shivnagar village which is 15 kilometres distance from the sub divisional town Benipatti in Madhubani district of Mithila region in Bihar, India. It is historical, religious and cultural heritage of the district. There are many temples in the campus of the Gandiveshwar Sthan. Gandiveshwar Nath Mahadev Mandir and Gaurishankar Mandir are the two main temples in the campus. Gandiveshwar Nath Mahadev Mandir is the temple of Shiva and Gaurishankar Mandir is the temple of the goddess Gauri and Shiva jointly. There are also the temple of God Kartikeya, Ganapati, Kalabhairava, Batuka Bhairava, Suryanarayana, Hanuman, Rama, Lakshmana, Kali, Sita and some other deities in the campus. This place is very famous for Mahashivaratri and Shravan Somvari festivals. Hindu devotees of Shiva gather here from different parts of the district in Shravan Somvari to Jalabhisheka (जलाभिषेक) and worship the Shiva.

== Legendary pond ==
In the premises of the Gandiveshwar Sthan, there is a legendary pond associated with the epic of the Mahabharata. There is a local legend that when the Pandavas needed water for bathing and worship, the hero Arjuna of the epic Mahabharata dug the pond with his arrow. The pond is a Banganga in the region.

== History ==
Before AD 1962 there was a dense forest near this place, where a huge number of wild pigs were living. In the leadership of Baba Rasbihari Das a very big Yajna was organised at this place in AD 1962. This place was made as Yajnasthali ( यज्ञस्थली ) and the forest was cleaned within the few area there. It is believed that, this is the battle place of the famous Kirat - Arjuna battle in the Mahabharata. Shiva came in the face of Kirat and did war with Arjuna. The war was for hunting of a wild pig. Arjuna threw an arrow with his bow on a wild pig for hunting. Then Shiva appeared there in the face of a Kirat person and he also threw an arrow on the same wild pig for hunting. Subsequently, a very extreme war was started between Arjuna and Kirat for hunting and in the last Shiva pleased with the battle skills of Arjuna and appeared in his original costume and awarded the famous divine arrow Pashupatastra to him.

== History of the present temple ==
The present Gandiveshwar Mahadev Temple was built by the son of Chan Chaudhary from Chanpura Village near the place. It is said that, Chan Chaudhary was childless person of the Chanpura village. He went to Baba Baidyanath Temple for being a child from Shiva. There he stayed in the hope of a boon of child. It is said that he saw a dream of Shiva. In his dream, Shiva asked him why had you come here, go to Gandiveshwar Mahadev Sthan at Shivnagar near your village and give service to the temple there. Shiva told him that he would always be there in the midnight. Then Chan Chaudhary came to this village to worship Shiva in the temple. He then soon became the father of a child, who later built the present temple of Gandiveshwar Sthan.
