= Bhavanipur =

Historical village in Mithila

Bhavanipur Bhawanipur
- Bhavanipur
- Interactive map of Bhavanipur
- Coordinates (Ugna Mahadev Mandir): 26.2456520°N 86.0995561°E
- Country: India
- State: Bihar
- Region: Mithila region
- District: Madhubani district
- Block: Pandaul

Population (2011)India Census
  - Total: 9,809
- Demonym: Maithil

Language
  - Official: Hindi

Additional language
  - Mother language: Maithili

Bhavanipur is a historic village in the Madhubani district of the Mithila region in the state of Bihar in India. According to legend, it is said that Ugna, the servant of Maithil poet Vidyapati revealed his true identity as Lord Shiva to the poet in this village.

== Demographics ==
According to population census 2011, the total population of the village is 9809.
