= Yajnavalkya Jayanti =

Hindu festival

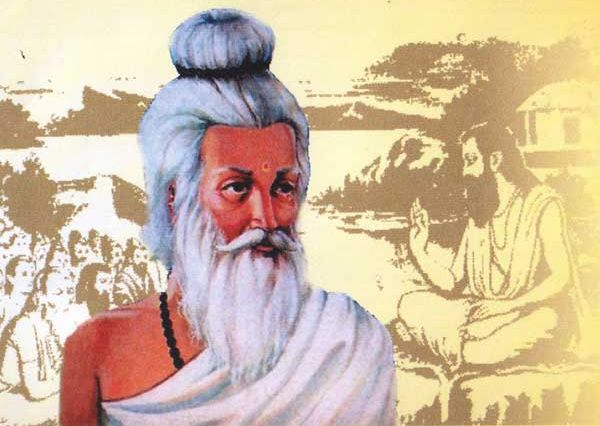
- Illustration of Yajnavalkya from a special cover released by India Post in 2018
- Also called: Yajnavalkya Janmotsava
- Observed by: Hindus
- Significance: Observance of the birth of Yajnavalkya
- Date: 13 March 2027
- Frequency: Annual
- Most recent date - 22 February 2026

Yajnavalkya Jayanti (Sanskrit: याज्ञवल्क्यजयंती, romanized: Yājñavalkyajayantī) is a Hindu festival observed to celebrate the birth of the Vedic sage Yajnavalkya. In the Vedic tradition, this day is an occasion to remember his life and wisdom.

In Hinduism, the sage Maharishi Yajnavalkya was a Vedic Acharya. Apart from being a guru, he was also a great scholar, legal expert and theorist. His legal treatise, the Yajnavalkya Smriti, holds immense significance for the Indian religions and its legal laws and justice. The Mitakshara school of Hindu laws is based on the commentary of the Yajnavalkya Smriti. It has profoundly influenced the Hindu law and justice. The oldest religious school of thought in the Mitakshara called Mithila school of Hindu Law is traditionally based on the Yajnavalkya Smriti.

== Dates ==
In northern India, scholars believe that Yajnavalkya was born on Phalguna Shukla Panchami. Some scholars believe Phalguna Krishna Panchami to be his birth date. In some parts of the subcontinent, scholars believe Kartika Shukla Dvadashi to be his birthday. In Gujarat, Yajnavalkya's birthday is considered to be on the seventh day in the month of Kartika.

According to the date of the Phalguna Shukla Panchami, the date of the upcoming year's Yajnavalkya Jayanti is on 13 March 2027.

== Literature ==
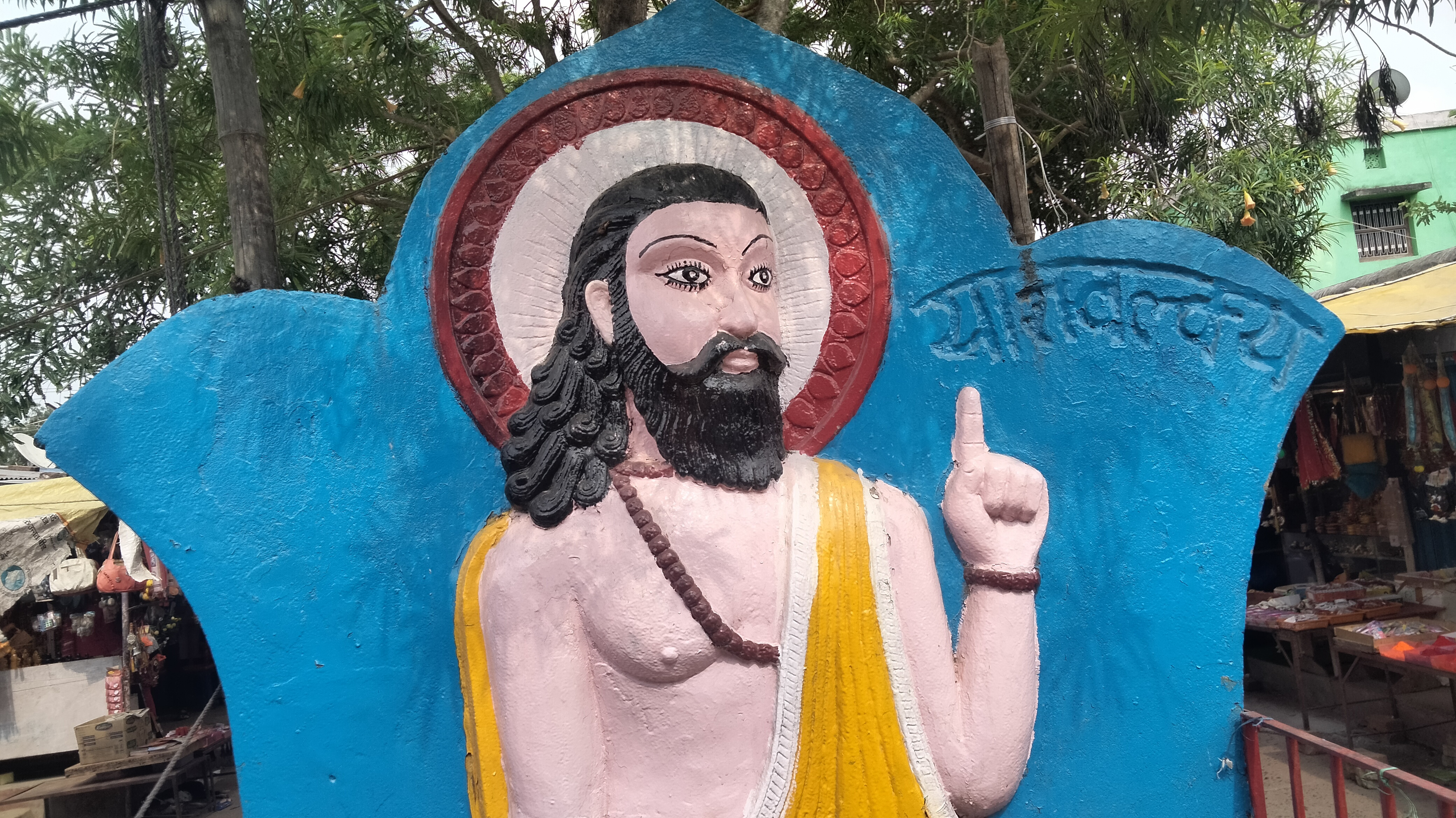
Memorial Statue of Yajnavalkya at the entrance of Uchchaith Bhagawati Mandir in Madhubani district near Benipatti Town of the Mithila region of Bihar

According to the Puranas, Yajnavalkya is considered to be an incarnation of Brahma, and he is sometimes regarded to be a Brahmarshi. In one legend, when Brahma gave place to Gayatri instead of his wife Savitri in a yajna, Savitri cursed him in anger due to which he was later born as Yajnavalkya in the house of a sage named Charana. According to other legend, Yajnavalkya was born on the Falgun Krishna Panchami in Mithila. His father and mother were respectively Brahmaratha and Sunanda. According to the text Shreemadbhagwat, his father name was Devaraaj.

According to the Skanda Purana, Brahma incarnated himself as Yajnavalkya in response to a curse from Shiva.

According to the Mahabharata, Vaisampayana, Yajnavalkya's maternal uncle and renowned teacher of the Vedas, grew resentful when the latter received knowledge of the sacred texts from Surya and started teaching them. A dispute arose between the two men regarding the selection of the dakshina (honorarium) to be offered at the sacrifice Bahudakshina Yajna of Janaka. In the Vishnu Purana, Vaisampayana is replaced by Paila. Vyasa asked Yajnavalkya to return the knowledge of the Vedas which he had obtained, and the latter promptly regurgitated them from his mouth. Two other sages present took the form of tittiri birds and instantly devoured the texts, thus lending them the name Taittiriya Upanishad. In the same text, Yajnavalkya wins Janaka as a disciple as well as a reward of one thousand cows from the latter after offering satisfactory answers to his questions, proving himself to be a consummate scholar.

He is attributed the authorship of a number of texts such as the Shatapatha Brahmana, Brihadaranyaka Upanishad, Ishopanishad, Pratyekshasutra, Yajnavalkaya Smriti, and the Yoga Yajnavalkya, and is hence regarded a significant figure in ancient Indian philosophy.

According to the Matsya Purana, Yajnavalkya is referred the Gotrakar of the Vasishtha clan, bearing the name Yajnadatta. Yajnavalkya has also been referred to as Kaushika in many texts, including the Mahabharata.

== Observances ==
His birth anniversary is celebrated every year with great reverence and devotion. On this occasion, prayers, worship and meetings are organized all over India and the texts written by Rishi Shrestha are recited. Also, people try to implement his teachings in their lives and guide themselves. The philosophy of Yajnavalkya is considered to be the philosophy of the soul. Yajnavalkya Jayanti is celebrated with great enthusiasm by the Brahmin communities in Tamil Nadu, Karnataka, Kerala and Andhra Pradesh. It is also celebrated in Uttar Pradesh, Madhya Pradesh and Bihar.

Every year on the Phalguna Shukla Panchami, one day cultural program is organised at the campus of the Yajnavalkya Ashram in the Mithila region locally known as Yajnavalkya Mahotsava.
