= Shringi Rishi Ashram, Singiya =

Ashram of Shringi Rishi in Mithila

- श्रृंगी ऋषि आश्रम, सिंगिया
- Interactive map of Shringi Rishi Ashram, Singiya

Monastery information
- Established: Treta Yuga

People
- Founder: Shringi Rishi

Architecture
- Heritage designation: Ancient Mithila University
- Style: Hinduism

Site
- Location: Singiya Village, Bisfi Block, Madhubani district, Mithila region, Bihar
- Country: India

Shringi Rishi Ashram (Maithili: श्रृंगी ऋषि आश्रम) at Singiya Village of Madhubani district in the Mithila region of Bihar is an ancient Ashram related to the Vedic sage Shringi in Ramayana. In the campus of Ashram there is a famous Lord Shiva temple known as Shringeshwar Mahadev Mandir.

Shringeshwar Mahadev Mandir
- श्रिंगेश्वर मदादेव मन्दिर

Religion
- Affiliation: Hinduism
- District: Madhubani
- Deity: Lord Shiva

Location
- State: Bihar
- Country: India
- Interactive map of Shringeshwar Mahadev Mandir

Architecture
- Type: Tirhut style
- Established: 18th-19th century
- The original ancient temple was believed to be established by Shringi Rishi

== Description ==
The Ashram was the residence place of the sage Shringi Rishi in the ancient Mithila region. According to legend, Shringi Rishi lived here for many years. According to scholars in Mithila, Rishi Shringi spent his last period of time here. The name of the village was derived from his name and called as Singiya. The campus of the ashram is taken care by a community organization named as Rishi Shringi Seva Samiti.

== Archeological survey ==
In the year 2020 a research work was conducted in the campus by Archeologists Shushant Kumar and Murari Kumar Jha in the chairmanship of Shree Ayodhyanath Jha, the head of the archeological department at Lalit Narayan Mithila University, Darbhanga. According to the research, the Mahadev temple situated in the campus of the ashram seems to be very ancient. The present temple appears to be built in the Tirhut art style around the late 18th or early 19th century. There are only two or three Shivlings found in the Mithila region similar to the structure of the Shivlinga in the Mahadev temple.
