= Ghoghardiha =

- city
- Location in Bihar, India
- Coordinates: 26.2833°N 86.4667°E
- Country: India
- State: Bihar
- District: Madhubani

Population (2011)
  - Total: 157,224

Languages
  - Official: Maithili, Hindi
- Time zone: UTC+5:30 (IST)
- Postal code: 847402
- Telephone code: 06277
- ISO 3166 code: IN-BR

Ghoghardiha is a city and a notified area in Darbhanga division, Madhubani district in the state of Bihar, India. Ghoghardiha is also a Railway Station which connects Saharsa to Laheria Sarai via Nirmali, Jhanjharpur, Lohana and Sakri.

The old name of this village was Gau-ghaddi (cow home). Later became Ghoghardiha.

== Demographics ==
At the 2011 India census, Ghoghardiha had a population of 157,224 (80,796 males and 76,428 females.

== Air Transport ==
Darbhanga Airport is the nearest airport around 73 km away in India and Rajbiraj Airport is the nearest airport roughly 59 km away in Nepal and can be accessed by Kunauli border. One can easily take erickshaw from border to Airport. Shree Airlines operates daily flights between Rajbiraj and Kathmandu The flight will cost roughly Rs 1,800 INR.
