= Gandhwari =

Village in Bihar, India

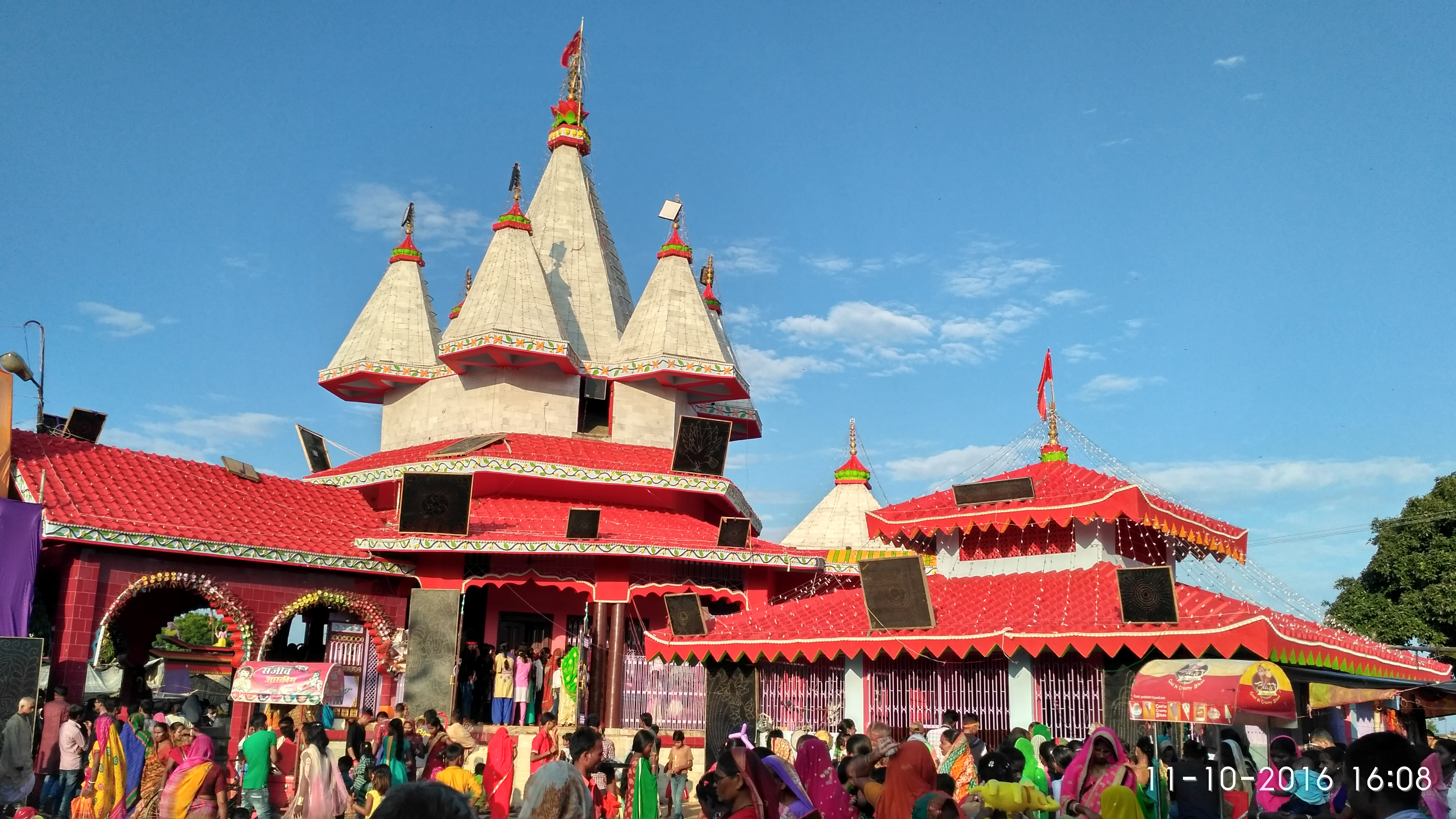
Durga Mandir, Gandhwari

Gandhwari is a village located in Madhubani District, Bihar, India. It belongs to the Madhubani Vidhan Sabha constituency.

An important festival in the town is the Durga Puja, held there since independence.

The local language is Maithili. Main occupation here is fishing, Mithila painting and animal husbandry.
