= Bisfi =

- Tehsil
- Bisfi
- Interactive map of Bisfi
- Coordinates: 26°19′27″N 85°52′58″E
- State: Bihar
- Region: Mithila region
- District: Madhubani district
- Subdivision: Benipatti

Population (2011)Population Census
  - Total: 13,981
- Demonym: Maithil

Languages
  - Official: Mother language: Hindi; Maithili language

Bisfi is a village and the headquarters of Bisfi block in the Madhubani district of North Bihar, India. It is about 26 kms from the district headquarters of Madhubani. It is the birthplace of Maithili poet Vidyapati.

== Description ==
Bisfi is a historical place in the Mithila region of Bihar, India. The significance of Bisfi can be traced from the ancient Vedic period to the mediaeval period. It is believed to be the home of prominent scholars like Yajnavalkya, Chandreshwar Thakur and Vidyapati, etc. The location of Yajnavalkya Ashram at Jagban village of Bisfi block gives it significant position in the pilgrimage of Hindu tradition. Similarly, Bisfi Vidyapati Dih is an important location for Maithili language and culture. According legend, it is said that Lord Shiva took the incarnation of Ugna as the servant of his popular devotee Vidyapati during 14th century in the Bisfi village. Ugna came to the courtyard of the house of the poet Vidyapati in search of a job. The story of Ugna and Vidyapati is very famous in the Mithila region of Bihar. There is a Lord Shiva temple at Bhairava village in the Bisfi block devoted to the Ugna incarnation. This temple is called Bhairava Ugna Mahadev Mandir.

According to legend, it is said that Shringi Rishi of the Ramayana period had lived at Singiya village of the block for several years. There is an ancient ashram named after him in the village. The ashram is called Shringi Rishi Ashram. In the campus of the ashram, there is a temple devoted to Lord Shiva called Shringeshwar Mahadev Mandir.

== History ==
Bisfi is called Bisapī (Devanagari: बसपी) in a copper plate grant dated to the year 293 of the Lakshmana Era (about 1400 CE) which granted the village to Vidyapati, describing it as "that village on the banks of the Vāgvatī known as Bisapī... with much cultivated land, of wide extent, watered by rivers, [and] endowed with woods and tanks." The grant was made by the king Shivasimha, who is also referred to in the grant by his title Rūpa Nārāyaṇa, from his capital of Gajarathapura. The village is described as being in the pargana of Jarail.

== Demographics ==
According to India's 2011 population census, the total population of the Bisfi village is 13981.
