= Baneshwar Sthan =

Lord Shiva temple in Mithila

Baneshwar Nath Mahadev Mandir
- बाणेश्वर नाथ महादेव मंदिर

Religion
- Affiliation: Hinduism
- District: Madhubani district
- Deity: Shiva

Location
- State: Bihar
- Country: India
- Ancient temple of Shiva related to the epic Mahabharata in Mithila region

Baneshwar Sthan (Maithili: बाणेश्वर स्थान) is an ancient place believed to be related to the epic Mahabharata in the Mithila region of Bihar in India. It is located at Barri village of the Benipatti block in the Madhubani district of Bihar. There is a temple of Shiva known as Baneshwar Nath Mahadev Mandir.

== Description ==
Baneshwar Sthan is a Hindu pilgrimage site at Barri village of the Madhubani district in Mithila region of Bihar. According to local legend, it is associated with the epic the Mahabharata. There is a temple tank known as Banganga. There is a large plot of approximately 85 bighas of land.

== Legend ==
According to legend, when Pandavas were exiled from their kingdom, they went there for worship during their Agyaata Vaasa period.

According to local legends, during the period of the Agyaata Vaasa there was a huge famine and water crisis in the region. The people of the region were very distressed due to the famine and the water crisis. To protect the people from the crisis of water due to the famine, Arjuna created a stream of Ganga from the earth with his Siki bow and arrow. The place in the Barri village where Arjuna created the stream of Ganga became a pond which later was called as Banganga. The people and another living creatures of the village thus got rid from the water crisis. It is said that after the creation of the divine pond Banganga, Arjuna saw Shiva in his dream and then he established a Shivalinga on the bank of the divine pond which later was called as Baneshwar Nath Shivalinga.
