= Shilanath Mahadev Mandir =

Lord Shiva temple in Mithila

Coordinates: 26°34′21″N 86°06′46″E

- शिलानाथ महादेव स्थान

Religion
- Affiliation: Hinduism
- District: Madhubani district
- Deity: Shiva

Location
- Location: Jaynagar Town, Mithila region
- State: Bihar
- Country: India
- Interactive map of Shilanath Mahadev Mandir

The Shilanath Mahadev Mandir (Maithili: शिलानाथ महादेव मंदिर) is an ancient temple in the Mithila region of India. It is located at the outskirts of the Jainagar town in the Madhubani district of Bihar. It is dedicated to Shiva. It is mentioned in the text Mithila Mahatmya, a surviving section of the larger text Brihada Vishnu Purana.

== Description ==
The Shilanath Mahadev Mandir is located at Shilanath Dullipatti village near the outskirts of the Jaynagar town in Madhubani district. It is situated at a distance of approximately three kilometers from the headquarter of the sub-divisional town Jaynagar. It is said that the Shilanath Mahadev Mandir is one of the nine shrines for Shiva. According to legend, it is believed that Ardhanarisvara, the composite form of Shiva and Parvati, originated at this site, from the mouth of the Kamala River.

Every year, on the occasion of Kartik Purnima, a festival fair is held at the campus of the temple called the Kartik Purnima Mela. In the fair, a huge number of devotees from different parts of the Madhubani, Sitamarhi, Shivhar, Samastipur, Darbhanga and other districts, as well from Nepal, participate in the fair. The devotees ritually bathe in the Kamala river and worship the lingam of Shiva in the temple.

== History ==
The structure of the present temple was renovated by the King Visheshwar of the Raj Darbhanga. The King Visheshwar was also an astrologer cum Pandit. He appointed a priest at the temple for conducting the regular worship of the deities in the campus of the temple. He also donated 36 acres of lands to the temple for the income of the priest's family.
