= Ekadash Rudra Mahadev Mandir =

Religion
- Affiliation: Hinduism
- Deity: Lord Shiva
- Festival: Mahashivratri

Location
- Location: Mangrauni village, Rajnagar, Bihar Block, Madhubani district, Mithila region
- State: Bihar
- Country: India

Architecture
- Founder: Founder - Pandit Munishwar Jha, Donor- Babu Jagdish Nandan Singh, Pujari-Baba Atma Nand Jha
- Established: 1953

Ekadash Rudra Mahadev Mandir is a Hindu temple dedicated to Lord Shiva at Mangrauni village of Madhubani district in the Mithila region of Bihar, India.

== Description ==
It is said that Ekadash Rudra Mahadev Mandir is the world's only one temple of Lord Shiva having eleven forms of Shivlinga. The eleven forms of Shivlinga are Mahadeva, Shiva, Rudra, Shankar, Neelalohit, Ishaan, Vijay, Bhima, Devadeva, Bhavodbhava and Kapalischa. All the Shivalingas are made of black granite stone, which are more than 200 years old. On every Monday of Sawan, a large number of devotees participate in the Mahasringar ritual of Ekadasha Rudra Mahadev lingams.

A rare idol of Lord Shiva and Goddess Parvati is also installed in the temple, in which Goddess Parvati is sitting on the left thigh of Lord Shiva. Lord Shiva's left hand is on Goddess Parvati's waist and his right hand is on her lips. On the left side of this idol is Basaha and beside it are Mahakali, Mahalakshmi, Mahasaraswati Yantra and Vishnu Paduka. There is another temple Radheshyam Mandir made of granite and ashtadhatu to the right of this temple, which has the Dashavatara form of Vishnu and Shri Vidyayantra whose work is to achieve the goal while keeping Lakshmi Saraswati equal. There is a Sarovar in front of the temple and Vishnu Pada Gaya Kshetra. There is Samadhi of Pandit Muniswar Jha next to the temple. There is also Mahakal Mandir next to which a huge pipal tree is there.

== History ==
According to the priest Baba Atmaram, the temple was established by the famous Tantrik Munishwar Jha in 1953. In 1997 Shankaracharya Jayendra Saraswati of Kanchi Peetha came here. Seeing the eleven divine forms of Lord Shiva on a single Shakti altar, he said "This is the only temple of its kind in the world, where the eleven Linga forms of Shiva have been established using the Tantric method." Tantrik Munishwar Jha wrote a Mantra having eleven Akshar. The Mantra is

"ऊॅ नम: शिवाय, एकादश रुद्राय।"

On 17 May 2001, Shankaracharya Nischalananda Saraswati of Puri Govardhan Peetha came here to worship Lord Shiva.
