= Hareshwar Nath Mandir =

Lord Shiva temple in Mithila

Coordinates: 26°07′30″N 86°25′55″E

- हरेश्वर नाथ महादेव मंदिर

Religion
- Affiliation: Hinduism
- District: Madhubani
- Deity: Shiva
- Festivals: Mahashivratri, Sombari, Narak Niwaran Chaturdashi
- Governing body: Department of Culture, Government of Bihar
- Status: Protected Monument of Bihar

Location
- Location: Dwalakh, Madhepur, Madhubani
- State: Bihar
- Country: India
- Interactive map of Hareshwar Nath Mandir

Architecture
- Founder: Darbhanga Maharaj Shree Lakshmeshwar Singh Bahadur
- Established: 1858 AD - 1868 AD

Hareshwar Nath Mahadev Mandir is an ancient Hindu Lord Shiva temple in the Mithila region of Bihar at Dwalakh village of Madhubani district. It is situated on the bank of Bhutahi-Balan river. It is an old Shiva temple.

== History ==
It is believed that the temple was built by the Darbhanga Maharaj Shree Lakshmeshwar Singh Bahardur of Darbhanga Raj Kingdom. It was built between 1858 AD and 1869 AD under the supervision of the then Chief Executive Officer, Shree Jhuna Lal Shah of the Kingdom. The Kingdom donated 12 acres of farming land to the temple for the source of fund to run the different religious activities of the temple. On the east side of the temple, there is a big pond for bathing purpose of the pilgrims coming to the temple for worship. The temple was included in the list of archeological department as "Protected Heritage Monument of Bihar" in 2015 by the Government of Bihar.
