= Bisfi Assembly constituency =

Coordinates: 26°19′20″N 85°52′33″E

Bisfi
- Constituency No. 35 for the Bihar Legislative Assembly

Constituency details
- Country: India
- Region: East India
- State: Bihar
- District: Madhubani
- Lok Sabha constituency: Madhubani
- Established: 1967
- Total electors: 328,813
- Reservation: None

Member of Legislative Assembly
- 18th Bihar Legislative Assembly
- Incumbent Asif Ahmed
- Party: RJD
- Alliance: MGB
- Elected year: 2025

Bisfi Assembly constituency is an assembly constituency in Madhubani district in the Indian state of Bihar. As of 2020, Haribhushan Thakur of BJP is the MLA.

== Overview ==
As per Delimitation of Parliamentary and Assembly constituencies Order, 2008, No. 35 Bisfi Assembly constituency is composed of the following: Bisfi community development blocks; Satlakha, Rahika, Saurath, Najirpur, Jagatpur, Kakraul North, Kakraul South, Malangia, Basauli, Sapta, Ijra and Hasanpur gram panchayats of Rahika, Madhubani, Bihar CD Block.

Bisfi Assembly constituency is part of No. 6 Madhubani (Lok Sabha constituency).

== Members of the Legislative Assembly ==
Year	Name	Party
1967	Raj Kumar Purbey	Communist Party of India
1969	Raj Kumar Purbey	Communist Party of India
1972	Aziz Nuruddin	Indian National Congress (O)
1977	Raj Kumar Purbey	Communist Party of India
1980	Raj Kumar Purbey	Communist Party of India
1985	Shakeel Ahmed	Indian National Congress
1990	Shakeel Ahmed	Indian National Congress
1995	Ramchandra Yadav	Communist Party of India
2000	Shakeel Ahmed	Indian National Congress
2005	Haribhushan Thakur	Independent
2005	Haribhushan Thakur	Independent
2010	Faiyaz Ahmad	Rashtriya Janata Dal
2015	Faiyaz Ahmad	Rashtriya Janata Dal
2020	Haribhushan Thakur	Bharatiya Janata Party
2025	Asif Ahmed	Rashtriya Janata Dal

== Election results ==
=== 2025 ===
2025 Bihar Legislative Assembly election: Bisfi
Party	Candidate	Votes	%	±%
RJD	Asif Ahmad	100,771	48.62	▲5.92
BJP	Haribhushan Thakur	92,664	44.71	▼3.72
Independent	Md Mohiuddin	3,772	1.82	
JSP	Sanjay Kumar Mishra	3,124	1.51	
Independent	Sogarath Choupal	2,149	1.04	
NOTA	None of the above	1,596	0.77	▼0.87
Majority		8,107	3.91	▼1.82
Turnout		207,250	63.03	▲8.42
RJD gain from BJP		Swing		

=== 2020 ===
2020 Bihar Legislative Assembly election: Bisfi
Party	Candidate	Votes	%	±%
BJP	Haribhushan Thakur	86,787	48.43	
RJD	Faiyaz Ahmad	76,505	42.7	−1.67
Independent	Maheshwar Prasad Chaudhary	2,416	1.35	−0.77
Independent	Raj Kumar Mukhiya	2,176	1.21	
NOTA	None of the above	2,935	1.64	+0.6
Majority		10,282	5.73	−16.35
Turnout		179,189	54.61	+1.92
BJP gain from RJD		Swing		

=== 2015 ===
In the Bihar legislative assembly election, 2015, Dr. Faiyaz Ahmad of RJD defeated Manoj Kumar Yadav Bhojpandaul of RLSP by a margin of 35,325 votes & became 2nd Term MLA. In November 2010 state assembly elections, Dr. Faiyaz Ahmad of RJD defeated his nearest rival Hari Bhusan Thakur of JD(U). Contests in most years were multi cornered but only winners and runners up are being mentioned. Hari Bhusan Thakur, contesting as an independent, defeated Md. Ahmar Hussain of Congress in October 2005 and February 2005. Dr. Shakil Ahmad of Congress defeated Abdul Hai of RJD in 2000. Ram Chandra Yadav of CPI defeated Dr. Shakil Ahmad of Congress in 1995. Dr. Shakeel Ahmed of Congress defeated Ram Chandra Yadav of CPI in 1990 and Raj Kumar Purbe of CPI in 1985. Raj Kumar Purbe of CPI defeated Aziz Nooruddin of Congress in 1980 and Siazul Islam of JP in 1977. Muslim voters are largest (30%) in Bisfi vidhansabha. Dalit, Brahmin, Ahir, Bhumihar, voters also play vital role in elections.

2015 Bihar Legislative Assembly election: Bisfi
Party	Candidate	Votes	%	±%
RJD	Faiyaz Ahmad	70,975	44.37	
RLSP	Manoj Kumar Yadav	35,650	22.29	
Independent	Haribhushan Thakur	25,796	16.13	
CPI	Mithilesh Kumar Jha	9,309	5.82	
Independent	Maheshwar Prasad Chaudhary	3,389	2.12	
Independent	Prem Shanker Jha	2,701	1.69	
BSP	Chameli Devi	2,271	1.42	
Independent	Anil Kumar Singh	1,754	1.1	
NOTA	None of the above	1,670	1.04	
Majority		35,325	22.08	
Turnout		159,971	52.69	
