= Alpura, India =

Alpura
- village
- Country: India
- State: Bihar
- District: Madhubani
- Established: 1972
- Elevation: 61 m (200 ft)

Languages
  - Official: Maithili, Hindi
- Time zone: UTC+5:30 (IST)
- Postal code: 847109
- ISO 3166 code: IN-BR

Alpura is a village situated in the Madhubani district of Bihar, India.
