= Jainagar, Bihar =

Jainagar Jaynagar
- Town
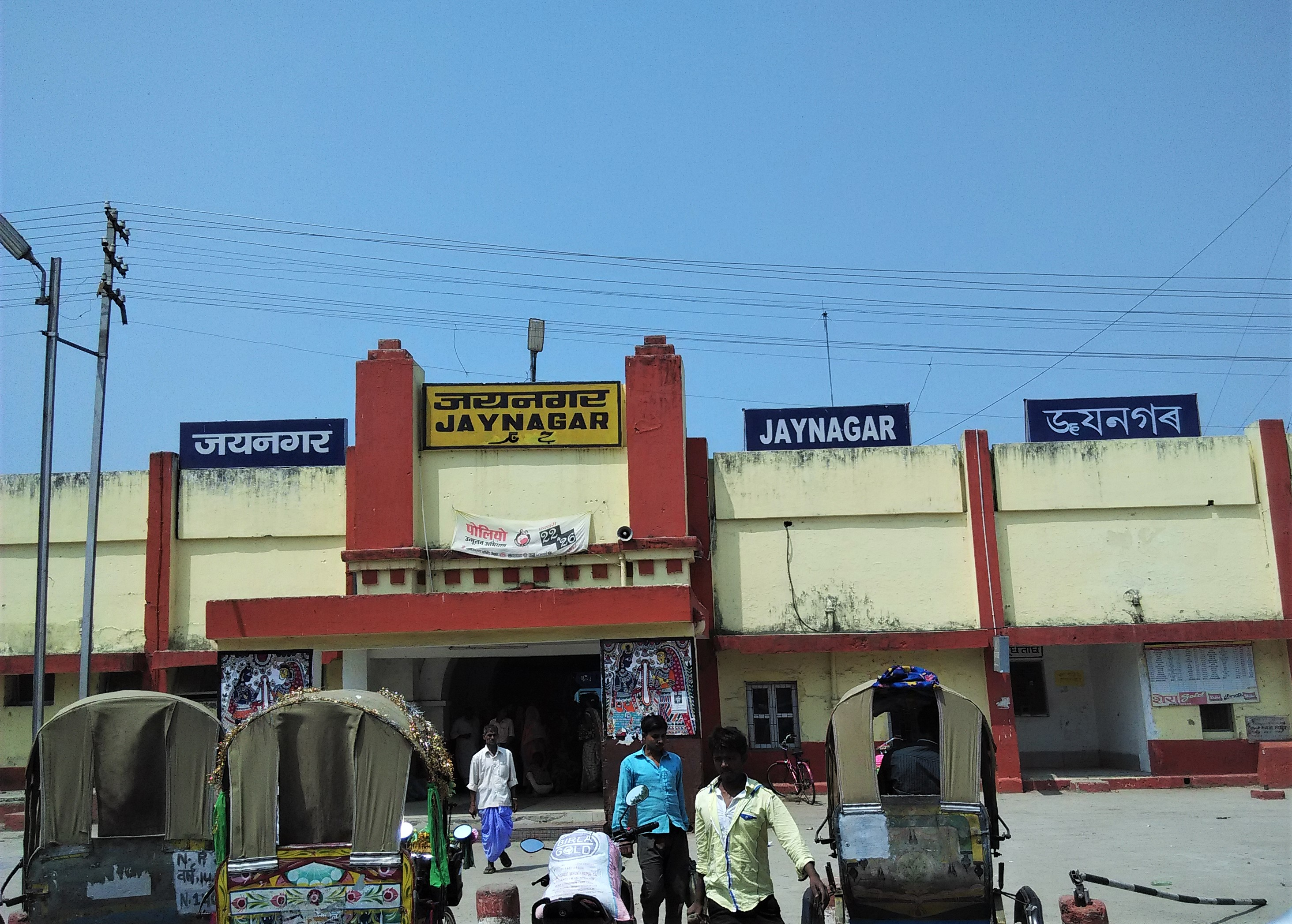
- Railway station in Jainagar

- Location in Bihar
- Coordinates: 26°35′33″N 86°08′14″E
- Country: India
- State: Bihar
- District: Madhubani

Population (2017)
  - Total: 217,820

Languages
  - Official: Maithili, Hindi
- Time zone: UTC+5:30 (IST)
- PIN: 847226
- Telephone code: 06246
- Lok Sabha constituency: Jhanjharpur
- Vidhan Sabha constituency: Khajauli
- Website: madhubani.nic.in

Jainagar (also spelled as Jaynagar) is a town and a notified area of Madhubani district in the Indian state of Bihar.

== Demographics ==
As of the 2011 India census, Jainagar had a total population of 2,17,820. Males constituted 51% of the population and females 49%. Jainagar had an average literacy rate of 79%, higher than the national average of 74.04%. Male literacy was 86%, and female literacy was 71%. 16% of the population were under 60 years of age.

== Description ==
Jaynagar is a border town in the Madhubani district of the Mithila region in Bihar, India. The Jaynagar Railway Station of the town is one of the major terminals in the Samastipur division of the East Central Indian Railway Zone. Shilanath Mahadev Mandir at the outskirts of the town is an important place for the Hindu pilgrimage in the region.
