= Gandiva =

Celestial bow of Arjuna

Service history
- Used by: Arjuna

Production history
- Designer: Brahma
- No. built: 1

Gandiva (IAST: Gāṇḍīva; Sanskrit: गाण्डीव) is a divine bow of Arjuna, one of the Pandavas from the Hindu epic Mahabharata. The bow was made by Brahma.

== Story of Creation ==
According to the Mahabharata, the legendary Gandiva bow was fashioned by Brahma, the creator of the universe, for the noble purpose of safeguarding Dharma. This sacred weapon was then passed on to Lord Shiva, who held it for a millennium before it was entrusted to Brahma for a period of 503 years. Subsequently, Indra wielded the bow for 580 years, followed by Chandra Deva for 500 years. Finally, Varuna held the bow for 100 years before bestowing it upon Arjuna, the valiant warrior of the Pandavas.

== How Arjuna got the Gandiva ==
Agni, the god of fire, wanted to devour the forest of Khandavaprastha, to regain his power and splendor. He had enlisted the help of the two heroes, Krishna and Arjuna. Arjuna was one of the best warriors and the greatest archer of the world at that time. He demanded from Agni a bow that would suit his strength, skill, and the power of celestial weapons.

Agni then requested Varuna to bless him with the desired weapon. Varuna gave the Gandiva bow to Arjuna, as well as two quivers which would provide an inexhaustible number of arrows. The bow was dreaded by many during the Kurukshetra war, having defeated and killed many great warriors and the gods themselves.

== Features ==
The Gandiva gives a wielder self-confidence and self-belief. It is believed to have the strength of one hundred thousand bows and the bow consisted of 108 celestial string. Gandiva was indestructible and was worshiped by the celestials and the Gandharvas.

== Return to the gods ==
At the end of the Dvapara Yuga, Krishna departed the Earth and left for Vaikuntha. When Krishna was departing, he told Arjuna to rescue the people of Dwaraka because he was submerging Dwaraka under ocean. Arjuna temporarily could not string the bow, or remember the spells necessary in order to summon his celestial weapons when Dwaraka was drowning. Arjuna knew that his time on earth was up as well, Vyasa had told him this event will happen and when it happens, Arjuna's work on earth is over. Later, the Pandavas retired and journeyed to the Himalayas. On their route, Agni came and asked Arjuna to return the Gandiva to Varuna, for it belonged to the gods. Arjuna obliged and dropped them in the waters of the sea. Thus the celestial bow was returned to the gods.

== See also ==
- Gandiveshwar Sthan
- Vijaya
- Sharanga
- Pinaka
