= Haribhushan Thakur =

Indian politician

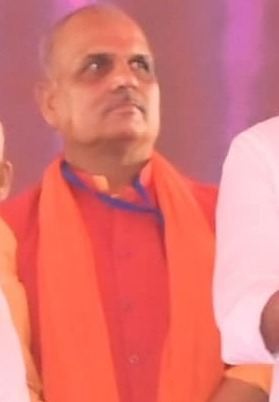

Member of Bihar Legislative Assembly
- In office 2020–2025
- Preceded by: Faiyaz Ahmad
- Succeeded by: Asif Ahmed
- Constituency: Bisfi
- In office 2005–2010
- Preceded by: Shakeel Ahmed
- Succeeded by: Faiyaz Ahmad
- Constituency: Bisfi

Personal details
- Born: 30 January 1969 (age 57)
- Party: Bharatiya Janata Party
- Occupation: Politician

Haribhushan Thakur is an Indian politician from Bihar and a Member of the Bihar Legislative Assembly. Thakur won the Bisfi Assembly constituency on the BJP ticket in the 2020 Bihar Legislative Assembly election.

== Controversy ==
Thakur is known for making controversial remarks. In February 2022, citing the creation of Pakistan after the Partition of India, he told media that Muslims should be deprived of their voting rights. His party leadership distanced themselves from his remarks and referred to them as his personal opinions. Opposition parties created a commotion in the assembly over his comments, Thakur stated to the media that his statement was aimed at Muslim MLAs who refuse to sing Vande Matram.
