= Pathasala =

Traditional schooling system in India

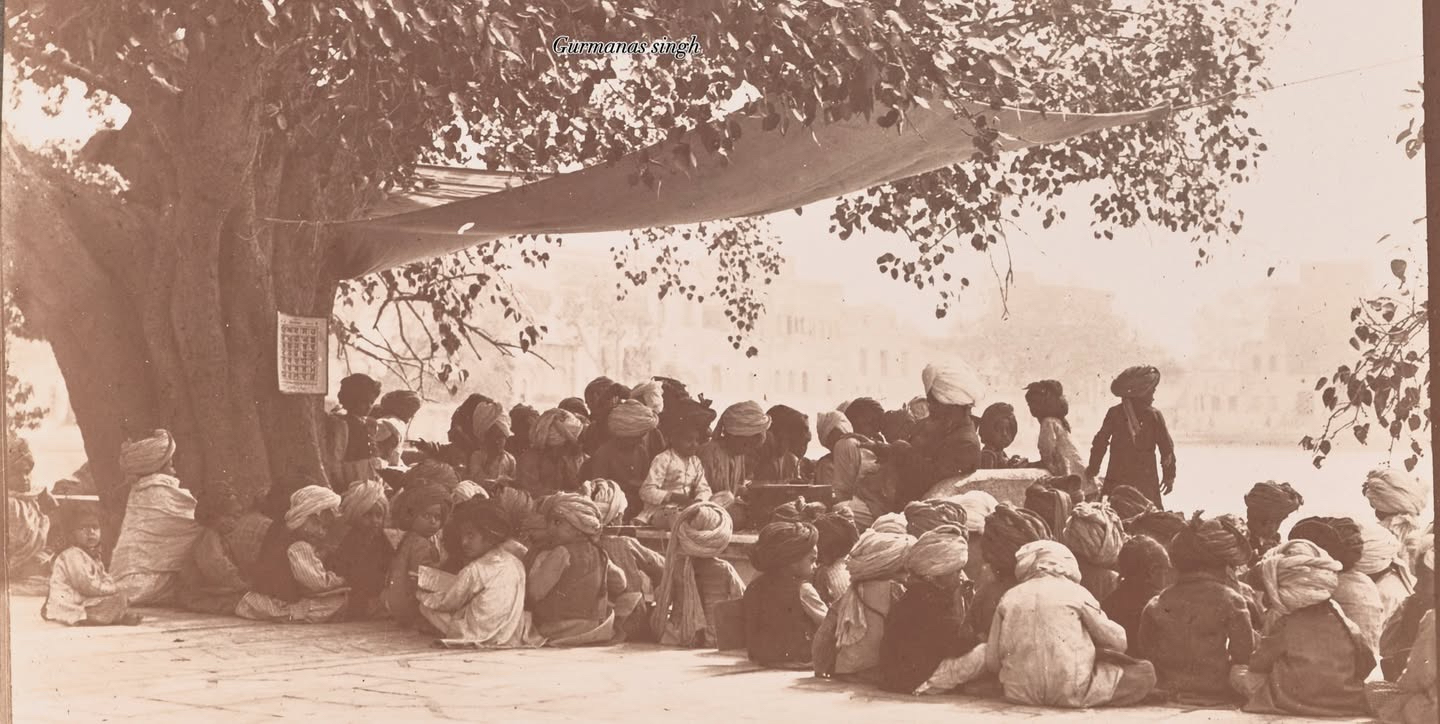
Photograph of a pathasala class held at the Golden Temple complex in Amritsar, Punjab, 1908

In Hinduism, a pathasala (IAST:Pāṭhaśālā; also written as pathashala) is a traditional religious school where knowledge of the Vedas and Sanskrit is taught. Before British rule, along with gurukulas, pathasalas served as primary educational institutions in India. Pathasalas were non-residential in nature, where as gurukalas were residential. In India, the term pathasala has become synonymous with the term vidyalaya which refers to school.

== See also ==
- Gurukula – Traditional Indian religious education system
- Shakha – Hindu theological school
- Kanchi Kamakoti Peetham
- Sadvidya Pathashala
- Jawahar Navodaya Vidyalaya

== Sources ==
- Cenkner, William (1995). A Tradition of Teachers: Śaṅkara and the Jagadgurus Today. Motilal Banarsidass. ISBN 978-81-208-0932-1.
