= National Highway 527B (India) =

National highway in India

National Highway 527B
- Map of National Highway 527B in red

Route information
- Length: 54 km (34 mi)

Major junctions
- From: Darbhanga
- To: Jainagar

Location
- Country: India
- States: Bihar
- Primary destinations: Khirma

Highway system
- Roads in India; Expressways; National; State; Asian
← NH 27	→ NH 227

National Highway 527B (NH 527B) is a National Highway in India. It is important highway in India-Nepal connectivity.

In August 2025, the proposed construction of Darbhanga-Jayanagar four-lane highway was delayed.
