= Yajnavalkya Ashram =

Gurukul

- याज्ञवल्क्य आश्रम
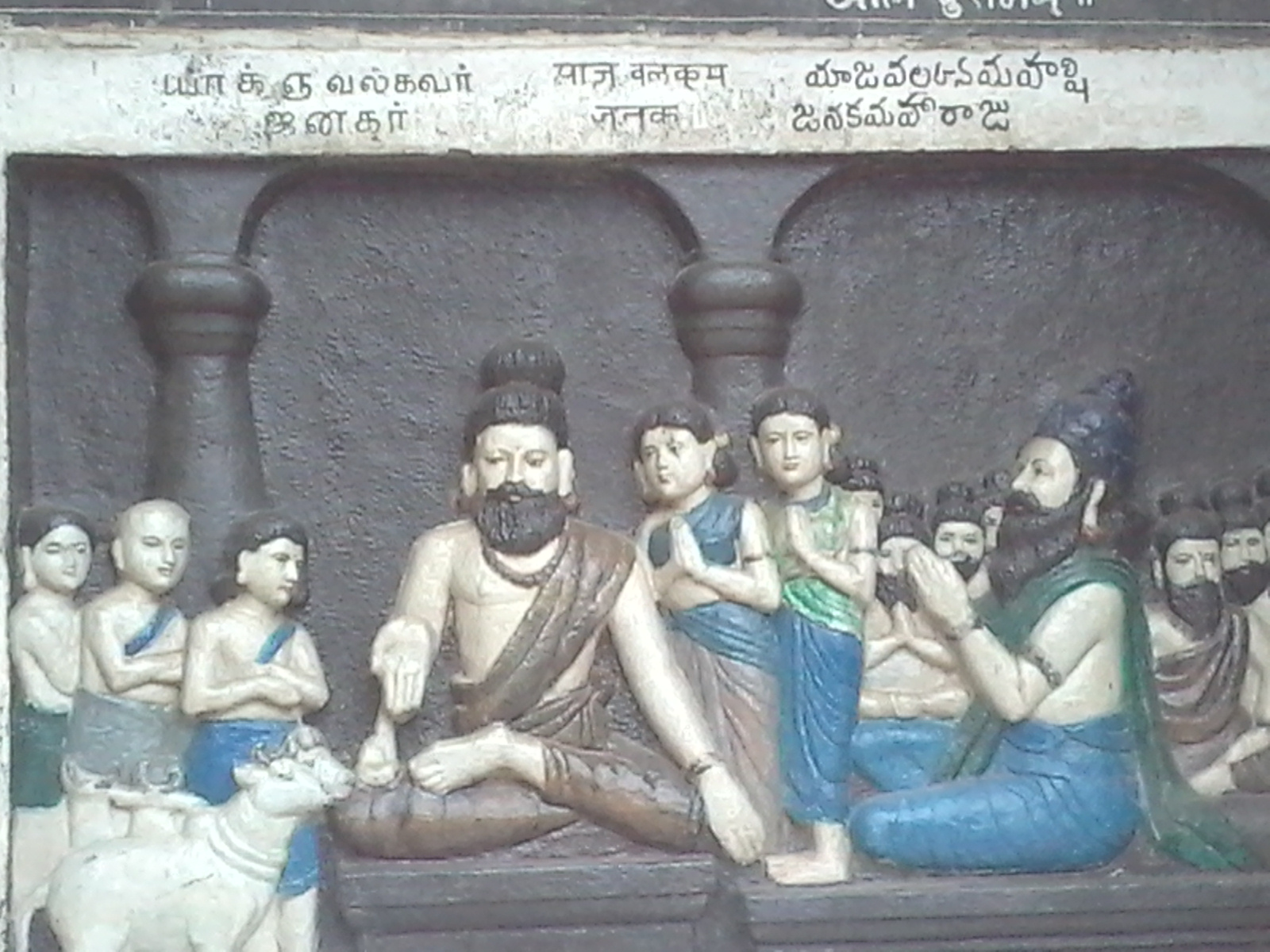
- Yajnavalkya teaches Brahma Vidya to King Janaka
- Interactive map of Yajnavalkya Ashram

Monastery information
- Established: 8th Century - 7th Century BCE
- Dedication: Veda, Yajnavalkya Smriti, Shukla Yajurveda, Brahm Vidya, Brihadaranyaka Upanishad, Shatapath Brahmana
- Celebration: Yajnavalkya Jayanti - Phalgun Shukla Panchmi

People
- Founder: Yajnavalkya

Architecture
- Style: Hinduism

Site
- Location: Jagban, Madhubani district, Mithila
- Country: India
- Coordinates: 26.3669460°N 85.8372388°E

Yajnavalkya Ashram (Sanskrit: याज्ञवल्क्य आश्रम) was a gurukul of the Indian philosopher Yajnavalkya. It is believed that Yajnavalkya got his enlightenment here. It is the place where he wrote many texts of an ancient Indian philosophy. He wrote Shatapatha Brahman, Yajnavalkya Smriti, Brihadaranyaka Upanishad, Yoga Yajnavalkya and many more. Yajnavalkya Ashram is situated at Jagban village of Madhubani district in Mithila region of Bihar.

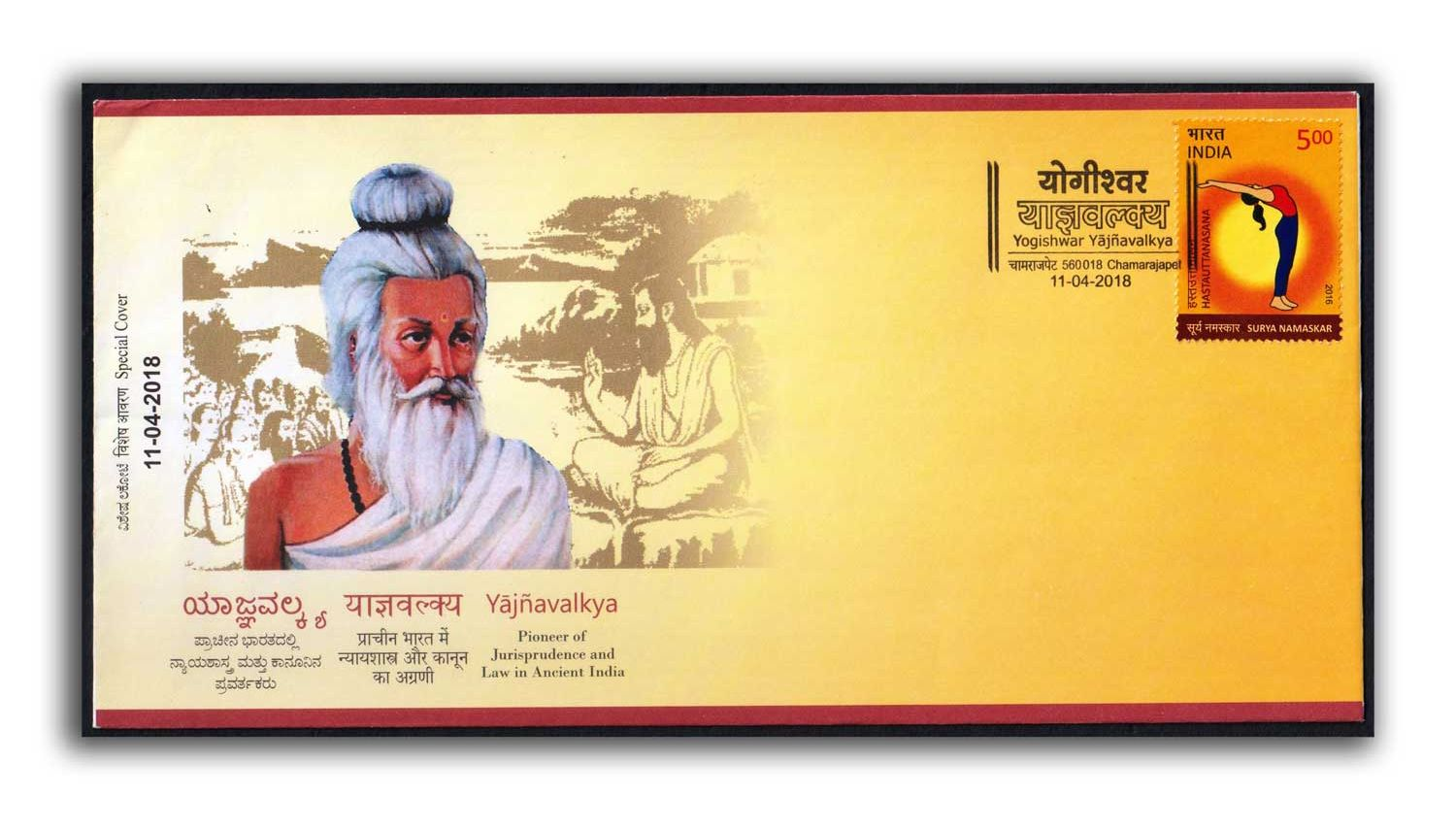
Special cover depicting the Vedic sage Yajnavalkya teaching his disciples at his ashram. It was released by the India Post at Chamrajpet in 2018.

== Description ==
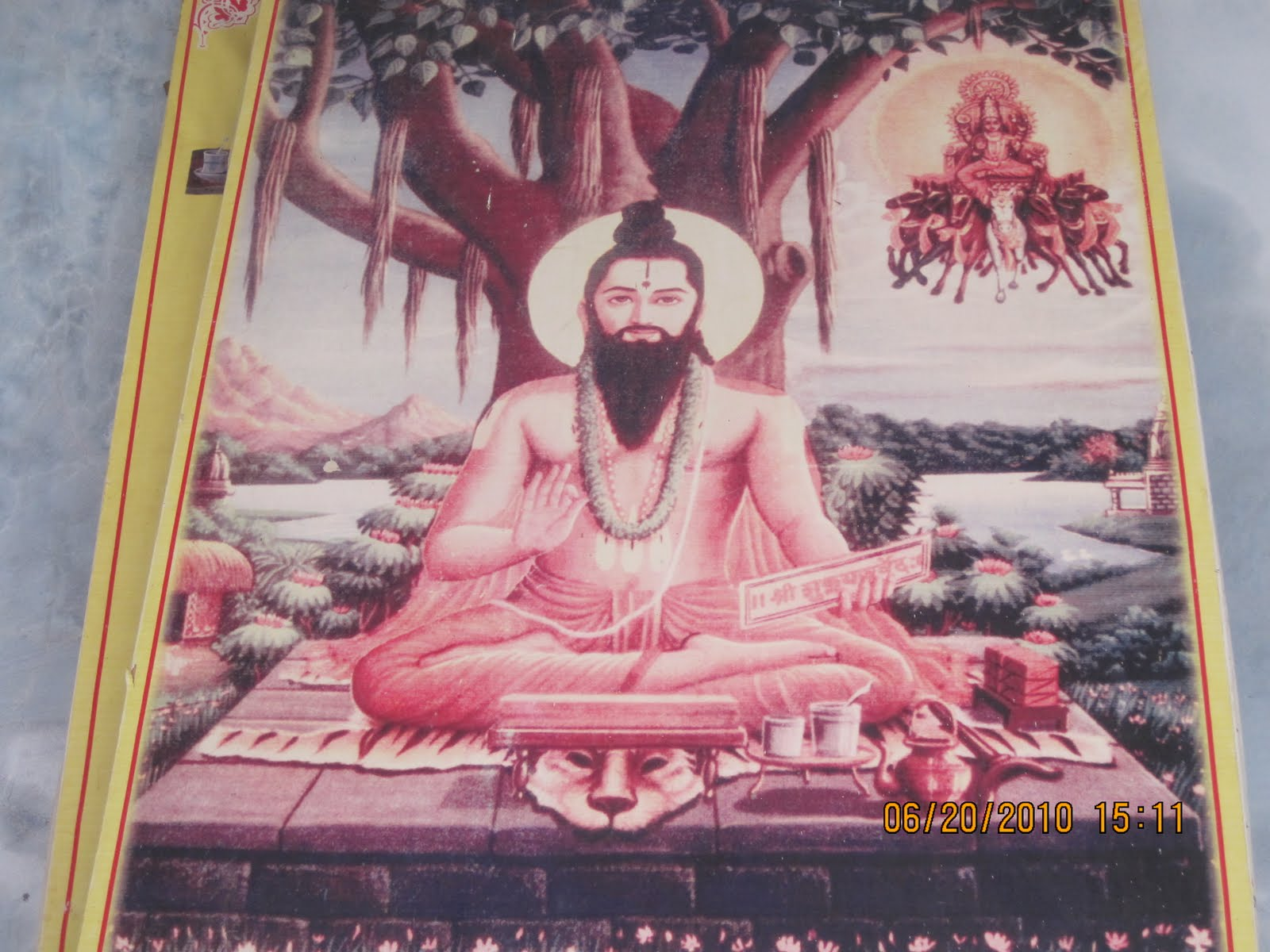
The photo depicts a symbolic image of the Vedic sage Yajnavalkya meditating under a Banyan tree to Lord Suryanarayana. It is an image of the Sage Yagnavalkya kept at Buddinni village in Karnataka. (Symbolic depiction of Yajnavalkya Ashram)

It is believed that the apabhramsha of Yajnavalkya is also Jago Rishi (जागो ऋषि). Jagban is the association of two words Jag (जग) and Van (वन ). Yajnavalkya performed his tough penance to the Lord Sun (Surya Narayan) for the enlightenment of his forgotten knowledge of Yajurveda for many days here. The Lord Sun became pleased with the tough penance of Yajnavalkya. He appeared to him in the form of enormous light energy and enlightened Yajnavalkya with the lost knowledge of Yajurveda with the help of the Goddess Saraswati. It is believed that the Goddess Saraswati entered the body of Yajnavalkya in the form of energy to enlighten him with the knowledge of Yajurveda. After that, Yajnavalkya wrote Shukla Yajurveda and taught it to his disciples. In the ancient Mithila, the pupils of Yajnavalkya came here to study with him. Janaka, the king of Mithila, came here to study Brahma Vidya with Yajnavalkya. Brahma Vidya is the study of Atman (self or soul) and God (Brahman). The Kuru King Janamejaya sent his son cum successor Satanika to Yajnavalkya for studying Vedas. Yajnavalkya Ashram was always open to the poor and needy for help and succour. Once, during a famine in the Himalayan valley, Yajnavalkya gave 200 ounces of gold to his disciple Brahmadutta to buy grain and other necessities, take physicians with him to the affected area, and render help. It was an important centre for the study of ancient Indian Philosophy at the Ancient Mithila University. Yajnavalkya became the head of the philosophical Vidya Parishad of the Ancient Mithila University. It is an important place for tourism of Hindu pilgrims but it is neglected by the local government. This place is associated with the places in Ramayana.

== An Ancient Giant Banyan Tree ==
In this Ashram, there is a very ancient giant Banyan (Bargad) tree spread over two acres of land. It is believed that this ancient wonderful tree has a relation with the Vedic sage Yajnavalkya. According to the local people of the village, there are many interesting stories related to the tree. It has been included as Saving the Guardian of Mithila. There is a forest-like feel around the nearly 700-year-old Banyan trees with dozens of branches. According to legend, the sound of Vedic chants resounded in early times. There is a temple dedicated to the sage Yajnavalkya on the campus. Its name is mentioned on the temple as Shree Yogeshwar Yajnavalkya Mandir. The locality of the ashram is mentioned as Yajnavalkya Nagar on the temple.

== Yajnavalkya Mahotsava ==
Every year on the birth anniversary of the Vedic sage Yajnavalkya, one day cultural program is organised in the campus of the Ashram locally known as Yajnavalkya Mahotsava. The birth anniversary of Yajnavalkya is also called as Yajnavalkya Jayanti. The prominent people of the Mithila region take part in the Mahotsava. They deliver speeches in memory of the sage Yajnavalkya. The contributions of Yajnavalkya in Vedic tradition and philosophies are remembered and discussed in the cultural program of the Mahotsava.

== Pranapratishtha Samaroh (2015) ==
In the year 2015, an idol of Yajnavalkya was installed at the temple in the campus of the ashram. The consecration ceremony for the statue of Yagyavalkya Muni was performed on 23 February 2015 amid Vedic chanting. On that day, a Kalash Shobha Yatra (procession) was taken out by 205 Kumari Kanyas (unmarried girls). The Pranapratishtha (consecration) ritual was conducted by Pandit Tirtharaj, a resident of Karnataka state in India. The ritual was conducted in the presence of the Peethadhishwar Mahavir Sharan Das Ji from the Gautam Ashram. He also addressed the devotees gathered on the occasion of the pranapratishtha and delivered a speech on the life of the sage Yajnavalkya.
