= Gurukula =

Traditional Indian religious education system

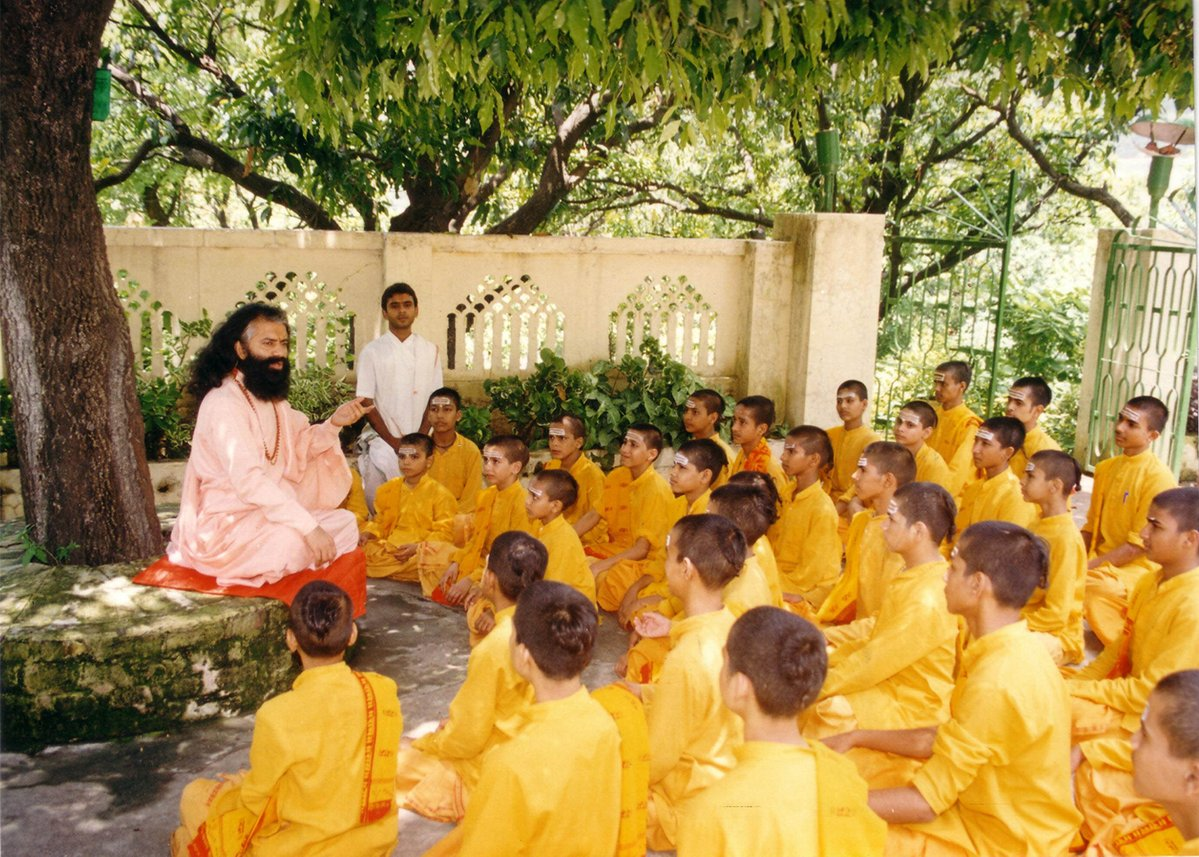
Guru teaching students in a gurukul

A Gurukula (or Gurukul) is a traditional system of ancient Indian education, introduced during the Vedic period in ancient India.

The disciples (sisya) lived with or near the Guru (teacher). The Guru did not charge anything for the education and the sisya (students) offered the Guru a gift called the Guru dakshina in order to thank them for the education.

== Etymology ==
The word gurukulam is a classical Sanskrit compound. Its etymology is straightforward, formed by a tatpuruṣa (determinative) compound of two distinct elements: guru (गुरु) and kula (कुल).

The first part, guru (गुरु), is a noun meaning "teacher", "master", or "preceptor". In the context of ancient Indian traditions, it specifically denotes a spiritual guide or a venerable teacher of sacred knowledge. The second part, Kula (कुल), also a noun denotes "community", "family" or "lineage".

== History ==
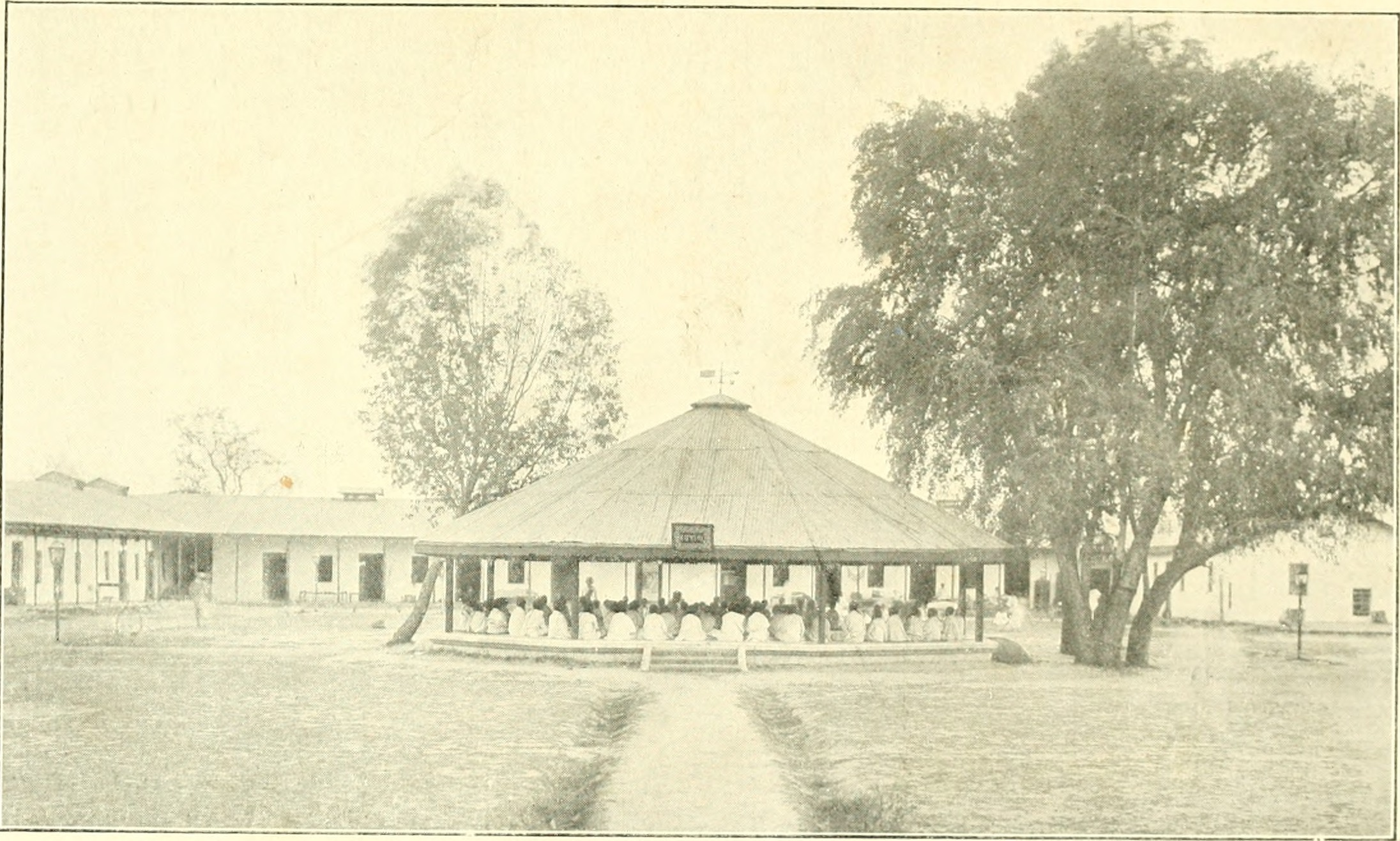
Arya Samaj Gurukul School boys performing a homa ritual (1915)

=== Ancient times ===
The gurukula system of education has been in existence since ancient times. The Upanishads (1000–800 BCE) mention multiple gurukulas, including that of guru Drona at Gurgaon. The Bhrigu Valli (a discourse on the Brahman) is said to have taken place in Guru Varuni's gurukula. The vedic school of thought prescribes the Upanayana (sacred rite of passage) to all individuals before the age of 8 at least by 12. From initiation until the age of 25 all individuals are prescribed to be students and to remain unmarried, as celibates.

Gurukulas were supported by public donations. This was followed by the many following Vedic thoughts making gurukul one of the earliest forms of public school centres.

=== 18th century and colonial period ===
Dharampal was instrumental in changing the understanding of pre-colonial Indian education system. Dharampal primary works are based on documentation by the colonial government on Indian education, agriculture, technology, and arts during the period of colonial rule in India. His pioneering historical research, conducted intensively over a decade, provides evidence from extensive early British administrators’ reports of the widespread prevalence of indigenous educational institutions in Bombay, Bengal and Madras Presidencies as well as in the Punjab, teaching a sophisticated curriculum, with daily school attendance by about 30% of children aged 6–15.

=== Revival of the gurukul system ===
By the colonial era, the system was on a steep decline in India. Dayananda Saraswati, the founder of Arya Samaj and Swami Shraddhanand, were the pioneers of the modern gurukula system, who in 1886 founded now-widespread Dayanand Anglo-Vedic Public Schools and Universities.

In 1948, Shastriji Maharaj Shree Dharamjivan das Swami followed suit and initiated first Swaminarayan gurukul in Rajkot in Gujarat state of India. Recently, several gurukulam have opened up in India as well as overseas with a desire to uphold tradition.

Various gurukulas still exist in India, and researchers have been studying the effectiveness of the system through those institutions. With the advent of new means of mass communication, many gurus and Vedantic scholars are opening E-gurukul. These gurukuls are operating online and are now imparting knowledge about different Hindu scriptures using the internet.

In 1990, Shrii Shrii Anandamurtiji founded Ananda Marga gurukula with its headquarters at Anandanagar, Dist Purulia, West Bengal, India and its branches all over the globe. {www.gurukul.edu} He nominated Acharya Shambhushivananda Avadhuta as its kulapati (chancellor) and formed a skeletal structure for spreading "neohumanist education" all over the globe.

== Education ==
The students learn from the guru and help the guru in his everyday life, including carrying out of mundane daily household chores. However, some scholars suggest that the activities are not mundane and very essential part of the education to inculcate self-discipline among students. Typically, a guru does not receive or accept any fees from the shishya studying with him as the relationship between a guru and the shishya is considered very sacred.

At the end of one's education, a shishya offers the guru dakshina before leaving the gurukula. The gurudakshina is a traditional gesture of acknowledgment, respect and thanks to the guru, which may be monetary, but may also be a special task the teacher wants the student to accomplish. While living in a gurukula, the students would be away from their home from a period of months to years at a stretch. Through Gurukul, students used to learn self discipline, politeness, good humanism and spirituality that would assist them to be an enlightened person in the future.

== Scholarly works on Gurukul ==
- Dharampal, a Gandhian scholar, authored a book titled The beautiful tree: Indigenous Indian education in the eighteenth century
- Prof. Marmar Mukhopadhayay compiled a book titled Total Quality Management in Education deriving insights from ancient education system. He also devised concept of Multi-Channel Learning based on Gurukul Pedagogy.
- Ankur Joshi authored a research papers titled - Elementary education in Bharat (that is India): insights from a postcolonial ethnographic study of a Gurukul, A post-colonial perspective towards education in Bharat, and Delivering holistic education for contemporary times: Banasthali Vidyapith and the Gurukula system.

== Out of India ==
The gurukula system of education is available outside of India as well. They are known as gurukul.

=== In Belgium ===
At the Jain Culture Center of Antwerp, children between the ages of 8 till 16 study Vedic mathematics, Art, Music, as well as Vedic Astrology, Jyotishi, Sanskrit and Yoga.

Children participate in this gurukul during holiday times at the traditional schools, for a week in October / November, 2 weeks during Easter break, and 1 month during summer break.

== See also ==
- Acharyakulam
- Akhara
- Akshaya Patra Foundation
- Ananda Marga Gurukula Teacher's Training College
- Convent school
- Education in India
- Ekal Vidyalaya
- Gurukul Kangri Vishwavidyalaya
- History of education in the Indian subcontinent
- Swaminarayan Gurukul
- Uchi-deshi (a similar system in Japan)
- Vanavasi Kalyan Ashram
- Vidya Bharti
- Pathasala
