= Madhubani district =

District in Bihar, India

- District
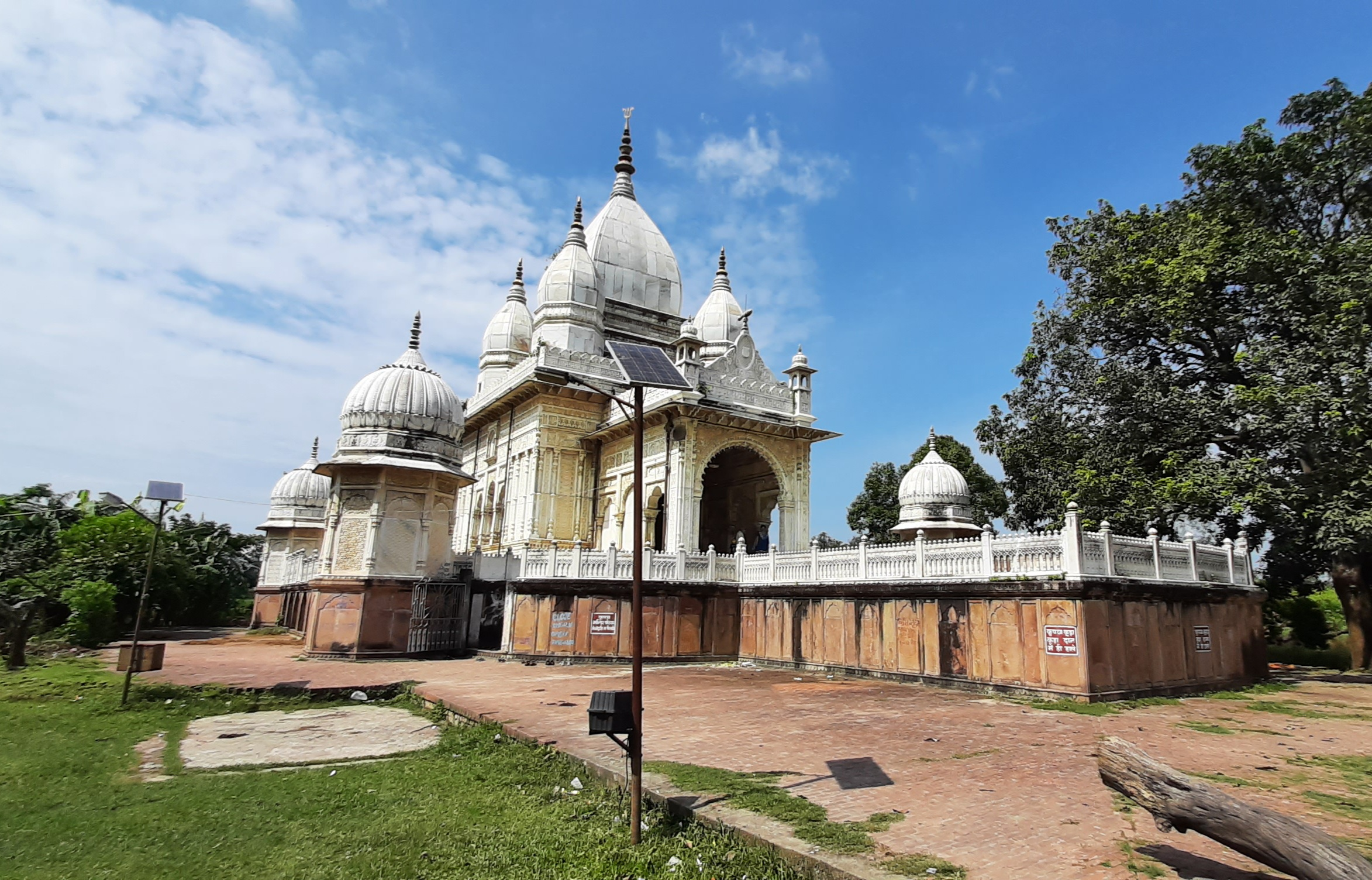
- Kālī Mandir in Rajanagar
- Interactive map of Madhubani district
- Coordinates (Madhubani, India): 26°24′N 86°15′E
- Country: India
- State: Bihar
- Region: Mithila
- Division: Darbhanga
- Headquarters: Madhubani

Government
  - District Magistrate & Collector: Arvind Kumar Verma IAS
  - Lok Sabha constituencies: Madhubani, Jhanjharpur
  - Vidhan Sabha constituencies: Harlakhi, Benipatti, Khajauli, Babubarhi, Bisfi, Madhubani, Rajnagar, Jhanjharpur, Phulparas, Laukaha

Area
  - Total: 67,000 km^{2} (26,000 sq mi)

Population (2011)
  - Total: 4,487,379
  - Density: 67/km^{2} (170/sq mi)
- Demonym: Maithil

Demographics
  - Literacy: 60.9 per cent
  - Sex ratio: 925

Languages
  - Official language: Hindi
  - Regional language: Maithili
- Time zone: UTC+05:30 (IST)
- Major highways: NH 27, NH 227, NH 227J, NH 227L, NH 527A, NH 527B
- Average annual precipitation: 1,273 mm
- Website: madhubani.nic.in

Madhubani district is one of the thirty-eight districts of Bihar, India, and is a part of Darbhanga division. Its administrative headquarters are located in Madhubani. The district has an area of 3,501 square kilometres (1,352 sq mi) and has a population of 4,487,379 (as of 2011).

Madhubani was the largest fish-producing district of Bihar in 2022.

According to the official district administration, the administrative setup of Madhubani consists of 5 sub-divisions, 21 blocks, 399 gram panchayats, and 1,115 villages.

== History ==
Madhubani became a district in 1972 when it was split from Darbhanga district. It is believed that Baliraajgadh, an archaeological site which lies in modern-day Madhubani district was the capital of the ancient Mithila Kingdom. In 2019 a meteorite fell at a farm in Mahadeva village in the district, and was later named as Mahadeva Meteorite.

== Geography ==
Madhubani district occupies an area of 3,501 square kilometres (1,352 sq mi), comparatively equivalent to the Bahamas' North Andros island. It occupies the Terai region.

== Politics ==
| District | No. | Constituency | Name | Party | Alliance | Remarks |
|---|---|---|---|---|---|---|
| Madhubani | 31 | Harlakhi | Sudhanshu Shekhar | JD(U) | NDA | |
| Madhubani | 32 | Benipatti | Vinod Narayan Jha | BJP | NDA | |
| Madhubani | 33 | Khajauli | Arun Shankar Prasad | BJP | NDA | Minister |
| Madhubani | 34 | Babubarhi | Mina Kumari | JD(U) | NDA | |
| Madhubani | 35 | Bisfi | Asif Ahmad | RJD | MGB | |
| Madhubani | 36 | Madhubani | Madhav Anand | RLM | NDA | |
| Madhubani | 37 | Rajnagar (SC) | Sujit Paswan | BJP | NDA | |
| Madhubani | 38 | Jhanjharpur | Nitish Mishra | BJP | NDA | |
| Madhubani | 39 | Phulparas | Sheela Kumari Mandal | JD(U) | NDA | |
| Madhubani | 40 | Laukaha | Satish Kumar Sah | JD(U) | NDA | |

== Economy ==
In 2006 the Ministry of Panchayati Raj named Madhubani one of the country's 250 most backward districts (out of a total of 640). It is one of the 38 districts in Bihar currently receiving funds from the Backward Regions Grant Fund Programme. But in last few years there a lot of changes happened. This city is going to adopt urbanisation.

== Places ==
Saurath, a road side village on Madhubani-Jainagar road, contains a temple known as Somnath Mahadev. It owes its importance to the annual Sabha held by Maithili Brahmins for negotiating marriages. Many Panjikars who keep the genealogical records of the different families reside here and outside. The festival of Durga Puja takes place in the village Gandhwari.

Laukaha is a Town in the district of Madhubani in the Indian state of Bihar. It is close to the border of Nepalese town of Thadi. Laukaha in India and Thadi in Nepal are a part of one of the agreed route for Mutual Trade between India and Nepal. Nepal Government of Nepal has set up a dedicated customs office in the town. and Government of India has set up a Land Customs Station with a Superintendent level officer. So in simple Import and Export are allowed in this location.

There were several Ashramas of the prominent Vedic sages in the region of the Madhubani district during the ancient times. Some of them are Yajnavalkya Ashram at Jagban, Kapil Ashram at Kapileshwar Sthan, Vishwamitra Ashram at Bisaul and Shringi Rishi Ashram at Singiya. Similarly there are several locations in the district which are associated either with Ramayana or with Mahabharata. Girija Devi Mandir at Phulhar is the place where it is believed that Lord Rama and Goddess Sita met each other first time in their lives. Gandiveshwar Sthan is believed to be the place where Arjuna in Mahabharata hid his famous Gandiva bow during the exile period of the Pandavas. Baneshwar Sthan at Barri village is believed to be the place where Arjuna established a Shivalinga known as Baneshwar Nath Mahadev. Similarly Kalyaneshwar Mahadev Mandir at Kalna is associated with Ramayana. It is believed that the Shivalinga of the temple was established by the King Janaka in Mithila.

In the mediaeval periods, some villages of the district were known for the study of Sanskrit literature, Indian Philosophy specially Nyaya Shastra and Vaisheshika Sutra. There are still some remains of the academies established by the prominent philosophers and scholars of the mediaeval periods at different villages in the district. They are Kalidas Dih, Vachaspati Mishra Dih, Ayachi Mishra Dih, Kumarila Bhatta Dih, Bisfi Vidyapati Dih and Musaharniya Dih, etc.

== Culture ==
Madhubani art or Mithila painting was traditionally created by the women of various communities in Mithila region of India and Nepal. It originated from Madhubani district of Mithila region of Bihar, and, it is popularly called Mithila painting or Madhubani art. Madhubani is also a major export centre of these paintings. This painting as a form of wall art was practiced widely throughout the region; the more recent development of painting on paper and canvas mainly originated among the villages around Madhubani, and it is these latter developments led to the name Madhubani art being used alongside the name "Mithila Painting."

== Subdivisions ==
Madhubani District consists of five subdivisions. Each subdivision is headed by a subdivisional magistrate, who is responsible for law and order, development, and revenue related work in their respective subdivisions.

1. Madhubani Sadar
2. Benipatti
3. Jhanjarpur
4. Phulparas
5. Jainagar

== Blocks and circles ==
There are 21 blocks and circles in the district and each block is headed by a block development officer and each circle is headed by a circle officer.

1. Rahika
2. Pandaul
3. Rajnagar
4. Babubarhi
5. Kaluahi
6. Khjauli
7. Jainagar
8. Ladania
9. Basopatti
10. Benipatti
11. Bisfi
12. Harlakhi
13. Madhwapur
14. Jhanjarpur
15. Andhrathadi
16. Lakhnaur
17. Madhepur
18. Phulparas
19. Ghoghardiha
20. Khutauna
21. Laukahi

== Demographics ==
Historical population
| Year | Pop. | ±% p.a. |
|---|---|---|
| 1901 | 1,052,146 | — |
| 1911 | 1,058,313 | +0.06% |
| 1921 | 1,052,477 | −0.06% |
| 1931 | 1,143,713 | +0.83% |
| 1941 | 1,248,825 | +0.88% |
| 1951 | 1,361,699 | +0.87% |
| 1961 | 1,601,048 | +1.63% |
| 1971 | 1,892,039 | +1.68% |
| 1981 | 2,325,844 | +2.09% |
| 1991 | 2,832,024 | +1.99% |
| 2001 | 3,575,281 | +2.36% |
| 2011 | 4,487,379 | +2.30% |

Religions in Madhubani district (2011)
| Religion | Percent |
| Hinduism | 81.39% |
| Islam | 18.25% |
| Other or not stated | 0.10% |

According to the 2011 Indian census, Madhubani district has a population of 4,487,379, This gives it a ranking of 37th in India (out of a total of 640). The district has a population density of 1,282 inhabitants per square kilometre (3,320/sq mi). Its population growth rate from 2001 to 2011 was 25.51%. Madhubani has a sex ratio of 926 females for every 1000 males, and a literacy rate of 58.62%. 3.60% of the population lives in urban areas. Scheduled Castes and Scheduled Tribes made up 13.08% and 0.09% of the population respectively.

Languages of Madhubani district (2011)
1. Maithili (84.1%)
2. Urdu (12.9%)
3. Hindi (2.92%)
4. Others (0.15%)

At the time of the 2011 Census of India, 84.07% of the population in the district spoke Maithili, 12.86% Urdu and 2.92% Hindi as their first language.

== See also ==
- Ayachi Mishra Dih
- Alpura, India
- Basuki Bihari
- Bichkhana
- Bisfi Vidyapati Dih
- Dakshineswar Nath Mahadev Mandir
- Ekadash Rudra Mahadev Mandir
- Gandiveshwar Sthan
- Ghoghardiha
- Hareshwar Nath Mandir
- Kalidas Dih
- Kalyaneshwar Mahadev Mandir
- Kapil Ashram
- Madhaweshwar Nath Mahadev Mandir
- Mithila Haat
- Musaharniya Dih
- Phulhar
- Shringi Rishi Ashram, Singiya
- Shilanath Mahadev Mandir
- Sitamarhi–Jaynagar–Nirmali line (via Sursand)
- Vachaspati Mishra Dih
- Vishwamitra Ashram, Bisaul
- Vishnu Statue, Bairwa, Madhwapur
- Uchchaith
- Yajnavalkya Ashram
- Baneshwar Sthan
- Sugarway Riverfront
- Dharmaraj Baba Mandir, Chahuta
- Raj Rajeshwari Mandir, Dokhar
- Bhowara
