= List of villages in Madhubani district =

This is a list of villages in Madhubani district of Bihar state, India.

== A–C ==
- Aunsi
- Balirajpur
- Bardaha
- Bardepur
- Baruar
- Basuki Bihari
- Belarahi
- Belhi
- Bhalni
- Bhatsimar
- Bhaur
- Bhoj Pandaul
- Bichkhana
- Bijlipur
- Bistaul
- Champa
- Dahila

Bhagwatipur

== D–L ==
- Damla
- Dahila
- Dhanga
- Gangdwar
- ghoghardiha
- Imadpatti
- Jamsam
- Jamuthari
- Kaluahi
- Kapsiya
- Karmauli
- Lakhnaur
- Laukaha
- Lohna

== M–N ==
- Madhepur
- Mahrail
- Maibi
- Malmal
- Mangrauni
- Mehath
- Mohanpur
- Mohna
- Nabtol
- Nagdah Balain
- Nahari
- Naruar
- Navani
- Navtol

== P–U ==
- Pandaul
- Parjuar Dih
- Pipraun
- Pirokhar
- Rajaur
- Ramnagar
- Rampatti
- Ranipur
- Sangram
- Sarisav Pahi
- Saurath Sabha
- Shibipatti
- Siriyapur
- Sudai
- Tajpur
- Trimuhan
- Uchhaith
- Uttra
