= Parjuar Dih =

Parjuar Parjuar
- village
- Location in Bihar, India Parjuar (India)
- Coordinates: 26.483611°N 86.004722°E
- Country: India
- State: Bihar
- District: Madhubani

Population
  - Total: 5,000
  - Rank: 1

Language - Maithili
- Time zone: UTC+5:30 (IST)
- >847229: 847229
- ISO 3166 code: IN-BR
- Website: www.parjuarpanchyat.com

Parjuar is a village located in Benipatti block in the Madhubani district of Bihar, India. It consists of six tolas: Ramnagar, Parjuar Dih, Parjuar West, Balha, Dahila, and Jetyahi. The village is located 19.8 km from its District Town of Madhubani.

Nearby villages are Nav Karhi (3 km), Paraul (3.1 km), Dhanga (3.6 km), Mureth (5 km), and Phent (5.5 km). The nearest towns are Kaluahi (5.6 km), Benipatti (9.7 km), Basopatti (10.4 km), and Loha (5.8 km). In this village one pond and one public school are available. Many festivals are celebrated by youth of this village, including MAA Sarde Puja, Kali Puja and Nawah, Shivaratri and Bhajan Kirtan.

== Festivals ==
Important festivals consist of Durga Puja, Krishnastmi and Vishwakarma Puja in Ramnagar, Kali Puja in Dih Tol, Durga Puja in Jetyahi, Krishnastmi in Parjuar West, and Ganesh Puja in Dahila, Ramnavami Puja in Balha, Shivratri Puja in Champa.

== Education ==
There are six government middle schools in Parjuar in different tolas and one high school in Dahila.
