= Lohna =

Lohna may refer to:

- Lohna, Bihar, a village in India
  - University of ancient Lohana, ancient Indian university in what is now Lohna
- Lohna, Himachal Pradesh, a village in India

== See also ==
- Lohana, an Indian caste
