= Shaligram Yadav =

Indian politician (1938–2021)

Member of the Bihar Legislative Assembly
- In office 2010–2015
- Preceded by: Ram Naresh Pandey
- Succeeded by: Basant Kumar
- Constituency: Harlakhi
- In office 2005–2010
- Preceded by: Yogeshwar Jha
- Succeeded by: Vinod Narayan Jha
- Constituency: Benipatti
- In office 1995–2000
- Preceded by: Yogeshwar Jha
- Succeeded by: Ramashish Yadav
- Constituency: Benipatti

Personal details
- Born: 2 January 1938 Loma, Benipatti, Bihar, India
- Died: 4 May 2021 (aged 83) Patna, Bihar
- Party: Janata Dal (United)
- Education: Bihar University

Shaligram Yadav (2 January 1938 – 4 May 2021) was an Indian politician and former member of the Bihar Legislative Assembly. He was the representative from the Benipatti and Harlakhi Assembly constituency.

== Early life ==
Shaligram Yadav was born in Loma, Madhubani, on 2 January 1938, the son of Devnandan Yadav and Ramraji Devi. He did his primary schooling from his hometown and higher study from Bihar University, Muzaffarpur where he received a B.A. and a master's degree in Hindi in 1960.

After finishing his higher education he worked in a textile industry and later joined in politics and also social reforms.

== Political career ==
Shaligram Yadav began his political career from Congress party at his late 40s. He was first elected for MLA in 1995 in independent candidacy from Benipatti, Madhubani, and won two more times from Janata Dal (United) party in 2005 and 2010.
