= Baruar =

Baruar may refer to these places in India:

- Baruar, Hardoi district, Uttar Pradesh state
- Baruar, Kaimur district, Bihar state
- Baruar, Madhubani district, Bihar state

== See also ==
- Barua, a surname from Assam, India
- Barua (Bangladesh), a Buddhist community of Bangladesh
