= Sudhanshu Shekhar =

Indian politician

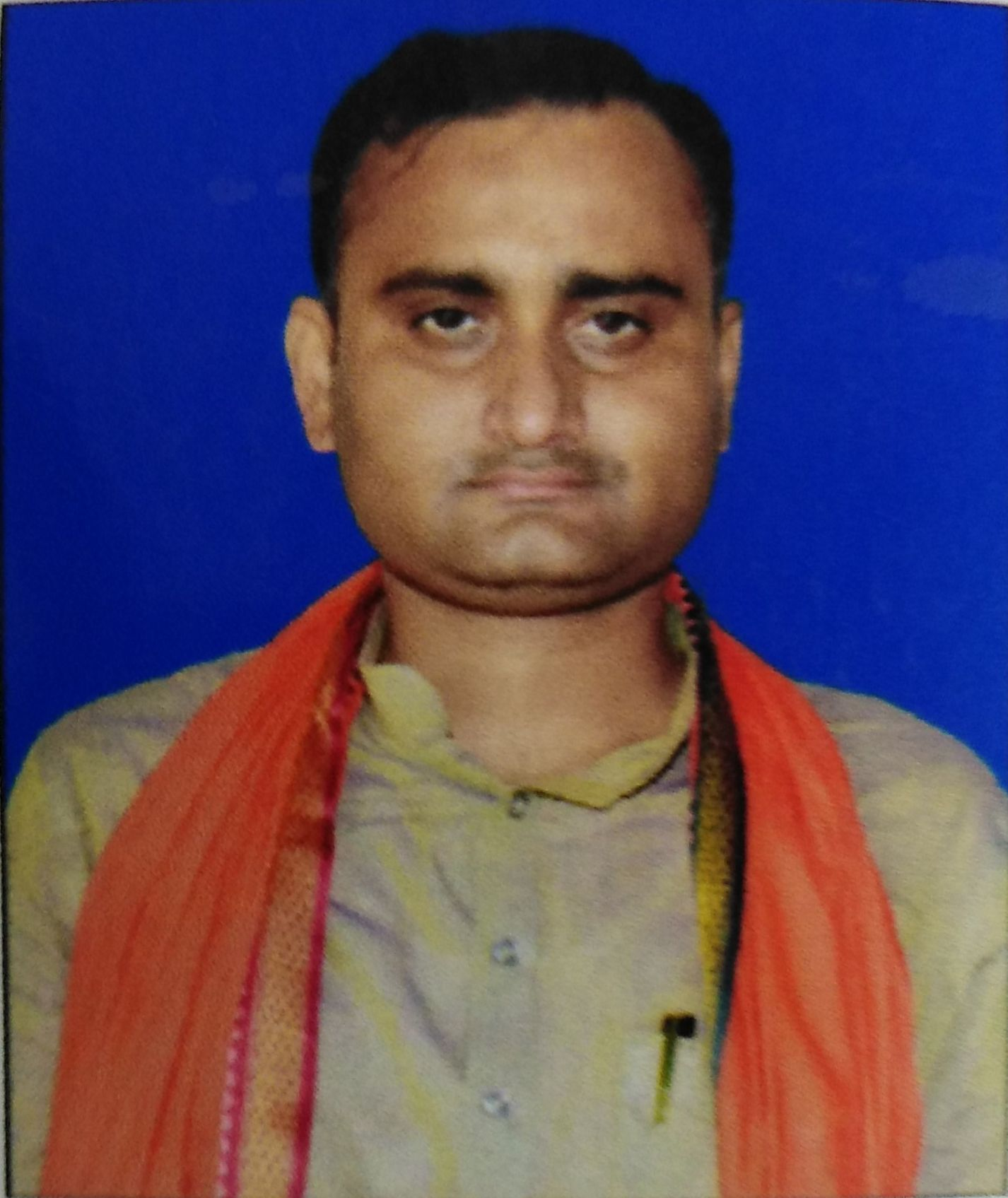

Member of the Bihar Legislative Assembly
- Incumbent
- Assumed office 2016
- Preceded by: Basant Kushwaha
- Constituency: Harlakhi

Personal details
- Party: Janata Dal (United)
- Other political affiliations: Rashtriya Lok Samata Party
- Parent: Basant Kushwaha (father)

Sudhanshu Shekhar (né Kushwaha) is an Indian politician based in Bihar, who has served as member of Bihar Legislative Assembly for two terms. Shekhar was elected to Bihar Legislative Assembly first in the year 2016, in a bypoll conducted for the Harlakhi Assembly constituency in Madhubani district of Bihar. In this bypoll, which followed the death of incumbent legislator from Harlakhi constituency, Basant Kushwaha, he defeated Mohammad Shabbir of Indian National Congress. This was followed by his second victory in 2020 Bihar Legislative Assembly elections, in which he retained this seat. Shekhar is the son of Rashtriya Lok Samata Party politician Basant Kushwaha.

== Political career ==
Shekhar contested the Assembly bypolls in the year 2016, which followed death of his father Basant Kushwaha in the same year. Kushwaha was elected to Bihar Legislative Assembly in 2015 Bihar Legislative Assembly elections by defeating the Indian National Congress candidate Mohammad Shabbir by a margin of 4000 votes. However, before assuming oath for the office of legislator, he died. The premature death of Kushwaha ensued a sympathy wave in the constituency, which resulted in Shekhar defeating his father's political rival Shabbir by a margin of over 18,000 votes. Both Kushwaha and Shekhar were elected on the symbol of Rashtriya Lok Samata Party of Upendra Kushwaha.

In 2018, Shekhar joined a revolt of the Rashtriya Lok Samata Party legislators against party president Upendra Kushwaha. At the time of this rebellion within party, RLSP had three member of parliament and two members in Bihar Legislative Assembly, besides a member in Bihar Legislative Council, Sanjeev Shyam Singh. The three legislators from the state's bicameral legislature, Lalan Paswan, Sanjeev Shyam Singh and Shekhar himself, declared themselves to be the real RLSP and caused a fraction within the party accusing Upendra Kushwaha of serving his own interest. The defecting legislators also demanded a ministerial berth in state council of ministers for Shekhar. Upendra Kushwaha had left National Democratic Alliance (NDA) by the time; his party RLSP had contested the 2014 Indian General Elections and 2015 Bihar Legislative Assembly elections as a part of NDA alliance. Shekhar and other defecting legislators announced in a press conference that they will remain in NDA.

In 2019, Shekhar along with his two other colleagues in RLSP joined Janata Dal (United) officially. Shekhar was fielded by JD(U) as its candidate from Harlakhi Assembly constituency once again in 2020 Bihar Legislative Assembly elections. He defeated Ram Naresh Pandey of Communist Party of India and retained the seat, becoming the MLA for the second time. Then in 2025 he won again 3rd consecutive time.

== See also ==
- Suryadev Singh
- Haridwar Prasad Singh
- Suchitra Sinha
- Maha Nand Singh
- Yogeshwar Jha
