= Harlakhi Assembly constituency =

Indian legislative assembly constituency

Coordinates: 26°37′30″N 85°58′14″E

Harlakhi
- Constituency No. 31 for the Bihar Legislative Assembly

Constituency details
- Country: India
- Region: East India
- State: Bihar
- District: Madhubani
- Established: 1951
- Total electors: 276,152
- Reservation: None

Member of Legislative Assembly
- 18th Bihar Legislative Assembly
- Incumbent Sudhanshu Shekhar
- Party: JD(U)
- Alliance: NDA
- Elected year: 2025

Harlakhi Assembly constituency is an assembly constituency in Madhubani district in the Indian state of Bihar.

== Overview ==
As per Delimitation of Parliamentary and Assembly constituencies Order, 2008, No. 31. Harlakhi Assembly constituency is composed of the following: Harlakhi and Madhwapur community development blocks; Karhara, Samada, Salha, Teoth, Mahamadpur, Pirokhar ,Betauna and Manpaur gram panchayats of Benipatti CD Block.

Harlakhi Assembly constituency is part of No. 6. Madhubani (Lok Sabha constituency).

== Members of the Legislative Assembly ==
Year	Name	Party
1952	Anak Kishore Devi	Indian National Congress
1962	Baidyanath Yadav	Communist Party of India
1967	Baidyanath Yadav	Communist Party of India
1969	Shakur Ahmed	Indian National Congress
1972	Shakur Ahmed	Indian National Congress
1977	Baidyanath Yadav	Communist Party of India
1980	Mithilesh Pandey	Indian National Congress (I)
1985	Mithilesh Pandey	Indian National Congress
1990	Veena Pandey	Indian National Congress
1995	Ram Naresh Pandey	Communist Party of India
2000	Sitaram Yadav	Rashtriya Janata Dal
2005	Ram Naresh Pandey	Communist Party of India
2005	Ram Naresh Pandey	Communist Party of India
2010	Shaligram Yadav	Janata Dal (United)
2015	Basant Kumar	Rashtriya Lok Samta Party
2016^	Sudhanshu Shekhar	Rashtriya Lok Samta Party
2020	Sudhanshu Shekhar	Janata Dal (United)
2025	Sudhanshu Shekhar	Janata Dal (United)

== Election results ==
=== 2025 ===
2025 Bihar Legislative Assembly election: Harlakhi
Party	Candidate	Votes	%	±%
JD(U)	Sudhanshu Shekhar	85,486	46.6	+10.5
CPI	Dr. Rakesh Pandey	49,250	26.85	+1.27
Independent	Md. Shabbir	22,041	12.02	−4.42
JSP	Ratneshwar Thakur	7,982	4.35	
Independent	Anil Jha	3,240	1.77	
Independent	Sanjeet Kumar Badal Gupta	3,164	1.72	
Janshakti Janta Dal	Jitender Yadav	1,907	1.04	
NOTA	None of the above	6,978	3.8	+3.06
Majority		36,236	19.75	+9.23
Turnout		183,437	66.43	+8.91
JD(U) hold		Swing		

=== 2020 ===
2020 Bihar Legislative Assembly election: Harlakhi
Party	Candidate	Votes	%	±%
JD(U)	Sudhanshu Shekhar	60,393	36.1	
CPI	Ram Naresh Pandey	42,800	25.58	+9.9
Independent	Md. Shabbir	27,499	16.44	
RLSP	Santosh Kumar Singh	6,807	4.07	−23.86
LJP	Vikash Kumar Mishra	6,177	3.69	
Independent	Shravan Kumar Yadav	3,698	2.21	
Independent	Mangesh Jha	3,039	1.82	
JAP(L)	Santosh Kumar Jha	2,960	1.77	
Independent	Mandakini Chaudhary	2,932	1.75	
Independent	Ajay Bhagat	1,865	1.11	
Independent	Archana Devi	1,854	1.11	
Sanyukt Vikas Party	Devan Mukhiya	1,665	1.0	
Independent	Satish Kumar	1,591	0.95	
NOTA	None of the above	1,242	0.74	−1.2
Majority		17,593	10.52	+7.84
Turnout		167,300	57.52	+1.43
JD(U) gain from RLSP		Swing		

=== 2016 bypoll ===
By-election, 2016: Harlakhi
Party	Candidate	Votes	%	±%
RLSP	Sudhanshu Shekhar	62,434	46.32	
INC	Muhammad Shabbir	43,784	32.48	
CPI	Ram Naresh Pandey	19,835	14.71	
NOTA	None of the above	8,326	5.81	
Majority		18,650	13.03	
Turnout		1,43,127	55.38	
RLSP hold		Swing		

=== 2015 ===
2015 Bihar Legislative Assembly election: Harlakhi constituency
Party	Candidate	Votes	%	±%
RLSP	Basant Kumar	40,468	27.93	
INC	Muhammad Shabbir	36,576	25.25	
CPI	Rishi Kumar Rai	22,709	15.68	
Independent	Ramashish Yadav	21,670	14.96	
Independent	Madan Chandra Jha	5,085	3.51	
Independent	Vishweshwar Chaupal	3,054	2.11	
BSP	Hiralal Sah	2,109	1.46	
SS	Rajnish Ram	1,608	1.11	
Independent	Purushottam Jha	1,512	1.04	
SP	Shaligram Yadav	1,474	1.02	
NOTA	None of the above	2,810	1.94	
Majority		3,892	2.68	
Turnout		144,866	56.09	
RLSP gain from JD(U)		Swing		

=== 2010 ===
In the November 2010 state assembly elections, Aditya Thakur of JD(U) won the Harlakhi assembly seat defeating his nearest rival Rishi Kumar Rai of CPI. Contests in most years were multi cornered but only winners and runners are being mentioned. Rishi Kumar Rai of CPI defeated Anuj Kumar of RJD in October 2005 and February 2005. Anuj Kumar of RJD defeated Rishi Kumar Rai of CPI in 2000. Rishi Kumar Rai of CPI defeated Vanya Yadav of Congress in 1995. Vanya Yadav of Congress defeated Rishi Kumar Rai of CPI in 1990. Bhuneshwar Jha of Congress defeated Vipul Borraha of CPI in 1985 and 1980. Pandey of CPI defeated sarpanch of Congress in 1977.
