= Vidyapati Tower, Benipatti =

Iconic tower dedicated to Vidyapati at Benipatti town

Vidyapati Tower
- विद्यापति टावर
- Established: June 18, 2025
- Location: Samsari Pokhair, Benipatti
- Coordinates: 26.4475141°N 85.9122518°E
- Type: Memorial Tower
- Key holdings: Museum, Vidyapati statue, and Park
- Collections: Statue of the Maithili poet Vidyapati
- Founder: Vinod Narayan Jha

Vidyapati Tower (Maithili: विद्यापति टावर) in the Benipatti town is an iconic tower dedicated to the prominent Maithil poet Vidyapati. It is located near the historical pond Samsari Pokhair in the Benipatti town of the Madhubani district in the Mithila region of Bihar in India. It was inaugurated by the BJP MLA Vinod Narayan Jha of the Benipatti Assembly Constituency in Bihar. The Vidyapati tower contains a statue of Vidyapati, a museum and a park around it dedicated to the Maithil poet Vidyapati. It was inaugurated on 18 June 2025.

== Description ==
The Vidyapati Tower in the Benipatti town of the Madhubani district was constructed at a cost of Rs 20 Lakh.
