= Bijlipur =

Bijlipur may refer to:

- Bijlipur, Punjab, a village in Ludhiana district, Punjab. Nationally noted for best child sex ratio in Punjab
- Bijlipur, India, a village in Bihar, India
