= Gisara =

Area in Sitamarhi, Bihar, India

- Location in Bihar, India Gisara (India)
- Coordinates: 26.48°N 85.39°E
- Country: India
- State: Bihar
- District: Sitamarhi
- Elevation: 55 m (180 ft)

Population (2011)
  - Total: 20,821
  - Density: 150/km^{2} (390/sq mi)
- PIN: 843311
- STD Code: +91-6226

Gisara urf Gidhsara is an area in the Sitamarhi district of the state of Bihar, in north-east India. Due to frequent flooding, Gisara has significant alluvial deposits. Because of its geography, the area is rich in agriculture. The main market areas pertaining to the tertiary sector are around Gisara Bazar and Gisara Chauraha (or square).

== Geography ==
The town is 50 kilometres (31 mi) from Muzaffarpur, the biggest town of north Bihar, and 14 kilometres (8.7 mi) from Sitamarhi, its district headquarters. Gisara has an average elevation of 55 metres (180 ft). The Gisara panchayat lies in the middle portion of Sitamarhi district. It is bordered by the Runni Saidpur panchayat. On the north, it borders the Belsand panchayat.

There is a 24-hour bus service connecting both Muzaffarpur and Sitamarhi with Gisara, both run by private operators. The nearest railway stations are in Muzaffarpur and Sitamarhi. The nearest airport is in Patna, approximately 125 kilometres (78 mi) from Gisara. The area is prone to flooding as it lies between two rivers, the Bagmati River and the Lakshmana (Lakhandey) River.

== Demographics ==
According to the 2001 India census, Gisara had a population of 20,821. Males constituted 53% of the population, and females 47%. 19% of the population was under 6 years of age. The total working population is 39.84% of the total population (63.67% of men, 13.56% of the women). The main working population is 33.68% of the total population (60.08% of men, 4.57% of women). The marginal working population is 6.16% of the total population (3.59% of men, 8.99% of women). 60.16% of the total population (36.33% of men, 86.44% of women) is non-working.

The literacy rate of the village was 28.57% compared to the literacy rate of state 47%, which is less than the state literacy rate. The female literacy rate was 14.28%, compared to male literacy rate of 41.52%.

== Industry ==
The major food crops of Gisara are rice, wheat and maize. The area is also a major producer of sugarcane, tobacco and other cash crops. Lentils, sunflowers and mustard are grown. Agriculture has given rise to many agro-based industries.

== Culture ==
The major festival of Gisara is Chhath Puja during which people offer prayers to the Hindu Sun God, Surya, also known as Surya Shashti. It is generally celebrated at home with family members and villagers. The festivals of Holi and Diwali are also widely celebrated. Other festivals such as Dusshera, Makar Sakranti, the Eid al-Fitr, Eid al-Adha, and Christmas are celebrated to varying extents.

Khichdi constitutes the lunch for most on Saturdays and is a staple food. It consists of rice and lentils seasoned with spices and served with items such as curd, chutney, pickles, papads, ghee and chokha (boiled mashed potatoes, seasoned with finely cut onions, green chilies). Afternoon meals mostly consist of rice, lentil and vegetables, while dinner consists of roti and vegetables. Gisara is also known for the sweet delicacies of Bihar, including Chhena ka jalebi and Kala Jamun.

A number of its buildings are ruins dating from the British occupation, including a high school and a place of worship, Gisara math. There is a bazaar near the Matha.
