= Dhaneshwar Nath Mahadev Mandir =

Ancient Lord Shiva temple in Mithila

- धनेश्वर नाथ महादेव मंदिर

Religion
- Affiliation: Hinduism
- District: Madhubani district
- Deity: Lord Shiva

Location
- Location: Belarahi village, Jhanjharpur subdivision, Mithila region
- State: Bihar
- Country: India
- Interactive map of Dhaneshwar Nath Mahadev Mandir
- Coordinates: 26.2564°N 86.2909°E

Architecture
- Established: 1844 AD
- Inscriptions: Mithilakshara (Tirhuta script)

Dhaneshwar Nath Mahadev Mandir (Maithili: धनेश्वर नाथ महादेव मंदिर) is a temple of Lord Shiva at Belarahi village in the Mithila region. It is located in the Jhanjharpur subdivision of the Madhubani district in Bihar. It is a mythical temple in the village. It is also known as Gaurishankar Mahadev Sthan. Its present architecture was built in the year 1844. It is locally also called as Baba Dhaneshwar Nath Mahadev Mandir.
