= Khajauli Assembly constituency =

Constituency of the Bihar legislative assembly in India

- Constituency No. 33 for the Bihar Legislative Assembly

Constituency details
- Country: India
- Region: East India
- State: Bihar
- District: Madhubani
- Lok Sabha constituency: 7. Jhanjharpur
- Established: 1951
- Total electors: 293,616
- Reservation: None

Member of Legislative Assembly
- 18th Bihar Legislative Assembly
- Incumbent Arun Shankar Prasad
- Party: BJP
- Alliance: NDA
- Elected year: 2025
- Preceded by: Sitaram Yadav

Khajauli Assembly constituency is an assembly constituency in Madhubani district in the Indian state of Bihar. It is an open seat now but was earlier reserved for scheduled castes.

== Overview ==
As per Delimitation of Parliamentary and Assembly constituencies Order, 2008, No. 33 Khajauli Assembly constituency is composed of the following: Jainagar and Basopatti community development blocks; Nararh East, Mahua Ekdara, Datwar, Sarabe, Rasidpur, Betakakarghati and Khajauli gram panchayats of Khajauli CD Block.

Khajauli Assembly constituency is part of No. 7 Jhanjharpur (Lok Sabha constituency).

== Members of the Legislative Assembly ==
Year	Name	Party
1952	Shakur Ahmed	Indian National Congress
1957	Shakur Ahmed	Indian National Congress
1962	Shakur Ahmed	Indian National Congress
1967	Narmedeshwar Singh	Praja Socialist Party
1969	Narmedeshwar Singh	Praja Socialist Party
1972	Mahendra Narayan Jha	Indian National Congress
1977	Ram Karan Paswan	Janata Party
1980	Ram Lakhan Ram Raman	Communist Party of India
1985	Bilat Paswan Vihangam	Indian National Congress
1990	Bilat Paswan Vihangam	Indian National Congress
1995	Ram Lakhan Ram Raman	Communist Party of India
2000	Ram Lakhan Ram Raman	Rashtriya Janata Dal
2005	Ram Prit Paswan	Bharatiya Janata Party
2005	Ram Prit Paswan	Bharatiya Janata Party
2010	Arun Shankar Prasad	Bharatiya Janata Party
2015	Sitaram Yadav	Rashtriya Janata Dal
2020	Arun Shankar Prasad	Bharatiya Janata Party
2025	Arun Shankar Prasad	Bharatiya Janata Party

== Election results ==
=== 2025 ===
Bihar Assembly election, 2025: Khajauli
Party	Candidate	Votes	%	±%
BJP	Arun Shankar Prasad	101,151	49.36	▲4.85
RJD	Braj Kishor Yadav	88,025	42.95	▲10.58
JSP	Rupam Kumari	4,637	2.26	
Independent	Rakesh Kumar Raushan	2,670	1.3	
Independent	Ram Babu Yadav	2,508	1.22	
NOTA	None of the above	3,522	1.72	▲1.08
Majority		13,126	6.41	▼5.73
Turnout		204,944	69.8	▲8.69
BJP hold		Swing	NDA	

=== 2020 ===
Bihar Assembly election, 2020: Khajauli
Party	Candidate	Votes	%	±%
BJP	Arun Shankar Prasad	83,161	44.51	+7.47
RJD	Sitaram Yadav	60,472	32.37	−11.19
JAP(L)	Braj Kishor Yadav	13,589	7.27	+6.57
Independent	Ambika Prasad Singh	8,355	4.47	
Independent	Dilip Kuwar	3,689	1.97	
Samajwadi Janata Dal Democratic	Virendra Kumar Yadav	2,782	1.49	
Independent	Amit Kumar Mahto	2,174	1.16	
NOTA	None of the above	1,193	0.64	−0.72
Majority		22,689	12.14	+5.62
Turnout		186,837	61.11	+2.35
BJP gain from RJD		Swing		

=== 2015 ===
2015 Bihar Legislative Assembly election: Khajauli
Party	Candidate	Votes	%	±%
RJD	Sitaram Yadav	71,534	43.56	
BJP	Arun Shankar Prasad	60,831	37.04	
CPI	Amiruddin	7,568	4.61	
Independent	Pursottam Jha	5,523	3.36	
Independent	Brajesh Raut	2,440	1.49	
BSP	Murari Thakur	2,281	1.39	
SP	Ram Kumar Yadav	1,837	1.12	
Independent	Sonu Kumar Jha	1,782	1.09	
ABHM	Sudhakar Kumar	1,657	1.01	
Independent	Vishwanath Yadav	1,636	1.0	
NOTA	None of the above	2,240	1.36	
Majority		10,703	6.52	
Turnout		164,227	58.76	
