= Vishwambharnath Mahadev Mandir =

Lord Shiva temple in Benipatti Town

- विश्वंभरनाथ महादेव मंदिर

Religion
- Affiliation: Hinduism
- District: Madhubani district
- Deity: Lord Shiva
- Festival: Mahashivratri

Location
- Location: Benipatti Town, Mithila region
- State: Bihar
- Country: India

Vishwambharnath Mahadev Mandir (Maithili: विश्वंभरनाथ महादेव मंदिर) is a Hindu temple of Lord Shiva in the Benipatti town of the Mithila region in the state of Bihar in India. It is a famous temple in the town. It is known for organising various Vedic celebrations like Mahayajna and Ramayana Paath. A large number of devotees come in temple from different villages near the town during the festivals of Mahashivratri, Sawan Sombari, etc. The Shivalinga of the temple is locally called as Baba Vishwambharnath Mahadev. The temple is managed by an organisation known Shree Shree 1008 Baba Vishwambharnath Mahadev Mandir Puja Samiti.
