= Arun Shankar Prasad =

Indian politician

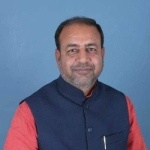

Minister of Labour Resources & Migrant workers Welfare Government of Bihar
- Incumbent
- Assumed office 7 May 2026
- Chief Minister: Nitish Kumar
- Preceded by: Samrat Choudhary(as Chief Minister)

Minister of Youth, Employment & Skill Development Government of Bihar
- Incumbent
- Assumed office 7 May 2026
- Chief Minister: Nitish Kumar
- Preceded by: Samrat Choudhary(as Chief Minister)

Member of Bihar Legislative Assembly
- Incumbent
- Assumed office 10 November 2020
- Preceded by: Sitaram Yadav
- Constituency: Khajauli
- In office 2010–2015
- Preceded by: Ramprit Paswan
- Succeeded by: Sitaram Yadav
- Constituency: Khajauli

Minister of Tourism Government of Bihar
- In office 20 November 2025 – 15 April 2026
- Chief Minister: Nitish Kumar
- Preceded by: Raju Kumar Singh
- Succeeded by: Samrat Choudhary(as Chief Minister)

Minister of Art and Culture Government of Bihar
- In office 20 November 2025 – 15 April 2026
- Chief Minister: Nitish Kumar
- Preceded by: Moti Lal Prasad
- Succeeded by: Samrat Choudhary(as Chief Minister)

Personal details
- Born: 31 December 1960 (age 65)
- Party: Bharatiya Janata Party
- Occupation: Politician

Arun Shankar Prasad is an Indian politician from Bharatiya Janata Party, Bihar and a three term Member of Bihar Legislative Assembly from Khajauli Assembly constituency. He has served as the minister of Tourism, Art, Culture and Youth of Bihar.He is currently serving as the Minister of Labour Resources & Migrant workers Welfare and Minister of Youth, Employment & Skill Development of Bihar.

He has been a sitting MLA from Khajauli Assemby since 2010 with an exception of 2015 Bihar Legislative Assembly election, when he lost to Sitaram Yadav of RJD.
