= Matras, Madhubani =

Village in Bihar, India

Coordinates: 26°15′05″N 86°27′00″E

Matras is a village situated in the Indian state of Bihar. It is a part of Madhuban Raj in Madhubani. It is a large village located in Madhepur Block of Madhubani district. It is located 15 km northeast of Madhepur City. Matras is part of the Jhanjharpur Division. The word "Madhuban" means "forest of honey", from which Madhubani is derived, but sometimes it is also known as "madhu"+"vaani" meaning "sweet" "voice/language".

== Vasantinav Vikas Foundation ==
This foundation works towards development of the Village in various sectors includes, education, health and culture heritage. And at present the foundation is working towards Bhagwati Mandir construction which is in its initial phase. Construction work is going on smoothly as each and every members of the Village is dedicatedly involved in this project and contributing financially to complete this project as soon as possible.

== Demographics ==
Matras is a large village located in Madhepur Block of Madhubani district, Bihar with total 1164 families residing. The Matras has population of 5510 of which 2871 are males while 2639 are females as per Population Census 2011.

In Matras population of children with age 0-6 is 1084 which makes up 19.67% of total population of village. Average Sex Ratio of Matras is 919 which is higher than Bihar state average of 918. Child Sex Ratio for the Matras as per census is 1041, higher than Bihar average of 935.

The village has lower literacy rate compared to Bihar. In 2011, literacy rate of Village was 54.99% compared to 61.80% of Bihar. In Matras Male literacy stands at 70.43% while female literacy rate was 37.68%.

As per constitution of India and Panchyati Raaj Act, Matras village is administrated by Sarpanch (Head of Village) who is elected representative of village. The village has one School situation near Matras Chauk adjacent with Bhagwati Mandir.
