= Sitaram Yadav =

Sitaram Yadav may refer to:

- Sitaram Yadav (politician, born 1946)
- Sitaram Yadav (politician, born 1952)
