= Lakhnaur =

- Village
- Location in Bihar, India Lakhnaur (India)
- Coordinates: 26.19°N 86.29°E
- Country: India
- State: Bihar
- District: Madhubani

Languages
  - Spoken: Maithili
- Time zone: UTC+5:30 (IST)
- PIN: 847403
- Website: www.lakhnaur.in

Lakhnaur is a village located near Jhanjharpur (a subdivision in the Madhubani district). It is located 15 km from the Koshi River, in the state of Bihar, India. The local language is Maithili.

The land is fertile, supporting the growth of mango, orchids, rice, wheats and makhana. There are also fish ponds. Nearby is the Badka Mahadev Lord Shiva temple, known for its mythological stories.

Lakhnaur has its own website, which is moderated by local villagers. In this block, the village of Umari is known for its five ponds and its fish exports, so is the cattle market at Laufa, where cows and buffaloes are traded.

== Educational Institutions ==
- Middle school, Lakhnaur
- Girls' school, Lakhnaur
- Dharawati high school, Lakhnaur
- Girls' high school, Lakhnaur
- Sanskrit school, Lakhnaur
- Kasturba Gandhi Balika Vidyalaya, Lakhnaur

== Places to visit ==
- Radha Krishna Mandir, Lakhnaur
- Baba Lakshminath Gosai Kuti, Lakhnaur
- Sita Ram Mandir, Lakhnaur
- Baba Somnath Mahadev Mandir, Lakhnaur
- Baba Bhuteshwar Nath Mandir, Lakhnaur
- Baba Dihvar Sthan, Lakhnaur
- Maa Durga Sthan, Lakhnaur

== Popular crossroads ==
- Dihvar chowk, Lakhnaur
- Ram chowk, Lakhnaur
- Bans chowk, Lakhnaur
- Mahakal chowk, Lakhnaur
- Durgasthan chowk, Lakhnaur

== Popular ponds ==
- Pakka Pokhair, Lakhnaur
- Bhavansar, Lakhnaur
- Baidaka Pokhair, Lakhnaur
- Navi Pokhair, Lakhnaur
- Bhutta Pokhair, Lakhnaur
