= Benipatti Assembly constituency =

Coordinates: 26°27′14″N 85°54′56″E

Benipatti
- Constituency No. - for the Bihar Legislative Assembly

Constituency details
- Country: India
- Region: East India
- State: Bihar
- District: Madhubani
- Established: 1951
- Total electors: 290,195
- Reservation: None

Member of Legislative Assembly
- 18th Bihar Legislative Assembly
- Incumbent Vinod Narayan Jha
- Party: BJP
- Alliance: NDA
- Elected year: 2025

Benipatti is one of the 243 Assembly Constituencies in Bihar in India.

== Overview ==
As per Delimitation of Parliamentary and Assembly constituencies Order, 2008, No. 32. Benipatti Assembly constituency is composed of the following: Kaluahi community development block; Bishunpur, Basaitha, Behata, Bankata, Pali, Parsauna, Dhagjara, Barhampura, Akaur, Nagwas, Naokarhi, Chatra, Parkhauli Tikuli, Anrer South, Anrer North, Paraul, Parjuar Dih, Dhanga, Mureth, Nagdah Balain, Kapasia, Barri, Shahpur, Meghben, Benipatti, Ganguli and Kataia gram panchayats of Benipatti CD Block.

Benipatti Assembly constituency is part of No. 6. Madhubani (Lok Sabha constituency).

== Members of the Legislative Assembly ==
Benipatti Assembly constituency known as Benipatti East and Benipatti West from 1952 to 1967.

- In 1952 Benipatti East and Benipatti West elected as Subodh Narayan Yadav and Shafi respectively.
- In 1957 Benipatti East and Benipatti West elected as Subhchandra Mishra and Chhote Prasad Singh respectively.
- In 1962 Benipatti East and Benipatti West elected as Rajkumar Purbey and Tej Narayan Jha respectively.

Year	Name	Party
1952	Subodh Narayan Yadav	Independent
1957	Chhote Prasad Singh	Indian National Congress
1962	Rajkumar Purbey	Communist Party of India
1967	Tej Narayan Jha	Communist Party of India
1969	Baidyanath Jha	Samyukta Socialist Party
1972	Tej Narayan Jha	Communist Party of India
1977	Tej Narayan Jha	Communist Party of India
1980	Yogeshwar Jha	Indian National Congress
1985	Yogeshwar Jha	Indian National Congress
1990	Yogeshwar Jha	Indian National Congress
1995	Shaligram Yadav	Independent
2000	Ramashish Yadav	Janata Dal (United)
2005	Yogeshwar Jha	Indian National Congress
2005	Shaligram Yadav	Janata Dal (United)
2010	Vinod Narayan Jha	Bharatiya Janata Party
2015	Bhawana Jha	Indian National Congress
2020	Vinod Narayan Jha	Bharatiya Janata Party
2025	Vinod Narayan Jha	Bharatiya Janata Party

== Election results ==
=== 2025 ===
2025 Bihar Legislative Assembly election: Benipatti
Party	Candidate	Votes	%	±%
BJP	Vinod Narayan Jha	87,153	49.74	−0.89
INC	Nalini Ranjan Jha	63,221	36.08	+6.41
Independent	Dr. Mrinal Jha	10,643	6.07	
JSP	Parvez Alam	4,220	2.41	
Independent	Pankaj Kumar Ram	1,964	1.12	
NOTA	None of the above	2,113	1.21	+0.15
Majority		23,932	13.66	−7.3
Turnout		175,220	60.38	+8.4
BJP hold		Swing	NDA	

=== 2020 ===
2020 Bihar Legislative Assembly election: Benipatti
Party	Candidate	Votes	%	±%
BJP	Vinod Narayan Jha	78,862	50.63	+12.62
INC	Bhawana Jha	46,210	29.67	−11.85
Independent	Rajesh Kumar Yadav	9,572	6.14	
Independent	Niraj Kumar Jha	3,878	2.49	
Independent	Vinod Shankar Jha	3,559	2.28	
Independent	Lalan Kishor Jha	2,299	1.48	−0.43
Independent	Vinodanand Kamat	2,128	1.37	
BSP	Nagendra Prasad Yadav	1,857	1.19	−0.3
The Plurals Party	Anuradha Singh	1,841	1.18	
NOTA	None of the above	1,648	1.06	−0.05
Majority		32,652	20.96	+17.45
Turnout		155,770	51.98	+2.35
BJP gain from INC		Swing		

=== 2015 ===
2015 Bihar Legislative Assembly election: Benipatti
Party	Candidate	Votes	%	±%
INC	Bhawana Jha	55,978	41.52	
BJP	Vinod Narayan Jha	51,244	38.01	
CPI	Kripanand Jha	9,758	7.24	
Independent	Vinodanad Kamat	2,825	2.1	
Independent	Lalan Kishor Jha	2,580	1.91	
BSP	Mishri Lal Yadav	2,011	1.49	
Independent	Rakesh Singh	1,878	1.39	
SP	Md. Akhtar Hussain	1,387	1.03	
NOTA	None of the above	1,492	1.11	
Majority		4,734	3.51	
Turnout		134,834	49.63	
