= Mehath =

Village in Bihar, India

Mehath is a village in Madhubani District, Bihar, India, about 3.2 km from Jhanjharpur. The village comes under Jhanjharpur assembly constituency. Maithili is the local language here, according to the 2011 census, Maithili is the language spoken by 98.7% of the people here.

== Demographics ==
The total population of the village is 4,923. The literacy rate is 84.00%. The female literacy rate is 7.9%. The male literacy rate is 8.7.%. The number of households in Balni Mehath is 1132; all the households are rural households. The working population is 64.00% of the total population. 69.00% of the men are working population; 58.00% of the women are working population.

Cast brahmin 87%, Yadav 5%, other castes 8%

== Climate ==
has a humid subtropical climate with hot summers from late March to early June, the monsoon season from late June to late September and a mild winter from November to February. The highest temperature ever recorded is 46.6 °C, in 1996;, the lowest ever is 2.3 °C, in 2003. The highest rainfall was 204.5 mm, in 1997. The table below details historical monthly averages for climate variables.

Climate data for Mehath
Month	Jan	Feb	Mar	Apr	May	Jun	Jul	Aug	Sep	Oct	Nov	Dec	Year
Mean daily maximum °C (°F)	23.3 (73.9)	26.5 (79.7)	32.6 (90.7)	37.7 (99.9)	38.9 (102.0)	36.7 (98.1)	33.0 (91.4)	32.4 (90.3)	32.3 (90.1)	31.5 (88.7)	28.8 (83.8)	24.7 (76.5)	31.53 (88.75)
Mean daily minimum °C (°F)	9.2 (48.6)	11.6 (52.9)	16.4 (61.5)	22.3 (72.1)	25.2 (77.4)	26.7 (80.1)	26.2 (79.2)	26.1 (79.0)	25.7 (78.3)	21.8 (71.2)	14.7 (58.5)	9.9 (49.8)	19.65 (67.37)
Average precipitation mm (inches)	19 (0.7)	11 (0.4)	11 (0.4)	8 (0.3)	33 (1.3)	134 (5.3)	306 (12.0)	274 (10.8)	227 (8.9)	94 (3.7)	9 (0.4)	4 (0.2)	1,130 (44.5)
Source: worldweather.org

Village - Balni Mehath, P.S - Bhairabsthan, Block - Jhanjharpur, Dist. - Madhubani (Bihar)

== Education ==
Schools near by Balni Mehath

- Government Primary School MEHATH.NO.(2)
- Government Middle School MEHATH.
- High school:- Dev narayan uchch vidyalaya. Bharam

Colleges near by Balni Mehath

- L. N. Janta College Jhanjharpur.
- Shivnandan Nandkishor mishra Mithila Mahavidyalaya Bhairavsthan.
