= Belarahi =

Village in Bihar

- Village
- Country: India
- State: Bihar
- Region: Mithila region
- District: Madhubani
- Sub division: Jhanjharpur Nagar Parishad
- Demonym: Maithil

Language
  - Official language: Hindi

Additional language
  - Mother language: Maithili
- PIN code: 847404

Belarahi is a historical village in the Mithila region of Bihar. It is located in the territory of the Jhanjharpur Nagar Parishad in the Madhubani district. A notable temple in the village is Dhaneshwar Nath Mahadev Mandir. Another but one of the oldest Ram Janki Mandir situated at the heart of village. originally build by Janki Ram Das, 200 years before, which is re-built by young villagers led by Sulok Kumar, Gunjan, Pintu, Amit, Sumant, Avinash in 2024.
