= Mohanpur, Madhubani =

Village in Madhubani, India

Mohanpur
- Village
- Country: India
- State: Bihar
- District: Madhubani
- Block: Pandaul
- Language: Maithili, Hindi
- PIN code: 847212
- Vehicle registration: BR 32

Mohanpur is an Indian village in the Mithila region of Bihar. It is about 4 kilometres away from the district headquarters, Madhubani.

== Demographics ==
Maithili is the language spoken here.

== Culture ==
The major festival of this area is Chhath Puja in which people offer prayers to Lord Sun. Holi, Diwali, Dussehra, Makar Sankranti and Christmas are celebrated.

== Transportation ==
Bus services are available here for the district headquarters Madhubani and various other famous places in the region.
