= Rampatti =

Village in Bihar, India

Coordinates: 26°20′N 86°09′E

Rampatti is a village in Madhubani District, Bihar, India. The hamlet has a central jail and a Jawahar Navodaya Vidyalaya.

Rampatti is part of the Rajnagar Vidhan Sabha constituency. The local language is Maithili.
