= Mohna =

Muslims in Mohna before Independence 1947

Mohna is a village in Jhanjharpur in the Bihar, India. Mohna is a village of Simra panchayat. It is surrounded with three main villages, Simra panchayat (Majhaura, Simra, Maheshpura) as well as Kanhauli.

NH 57 is the main road which connects Mohna from Darbhanga and Patna in Bihar and Silliguri of West Bengal. This National Highway is also known as the East- West Corridor. The length of this corridor is about 3,214 km. It starts from Porbandar in Gujarat and ends at Silchar in Assam.
