= Bhawana Jha =

Indian politician (born 1973)

Bihar Legislative Assembly
- In office 2015–2020
- Preceded by: Vinod Narayan Jha
- Succeeded by: Vinod Narayan Jha
- Constituency: Benipatti

Personal details
- Born: 3 December 1973 (age 52)
- Party: Indian National Congress
- Parent: Father - Yogeshwar Jha

Bhawana Jha is an Indian politician and was the former member of Bihar Legislative Assembly from Benipatti (Vidhan Sabha constituency). In the 2015 Bihar Assembly Election, she contested from Benipatti (Vidhan Sabha constituency), Madhubani district and defeated senior BJP leader Vinod Narayan Jha.
