= Sujit Paswan =

Indian politician

Sujit Kumar

Member of the Bihar Legislative Assembly
- Incumbent
- Assumed office 14 November 2025
- Preceded by: Ram Prit Paswan
- Constituency: Rajnagar

Personal details
- Party: Bharatiya Janata Party

Sujit Kumar is an Indian politician from Bharatiya Janata Party and a member of Bihar Legislative Assembly from Rajnagar, Bihar Assembly constituency seat.
