= Maibi, Madhubani =

Coordinates: 25.6516°N 85.5126°E

Maibi is a panchyat in Bihar state, India. It is one of seven villages in this panchayat Maibi panchayat

- Baswan
- Amarupi
- Biharpur
- Maibi
- Bahera
- Sonbarsha
- Manmohan

in the Lakhnaur block, Jhanjharpur subdivision, Madhubani District of Bihar.

Maibi is populated by various castes, such as

1. Yadav
2. Brahmins,
3. Koir
4. , Chamar,
5. Dom,
6. as well as by Muslims.

Elected Representative of this panchayat Manisha Devi till 2026

== Items of Note ==
- Baba Tapneshwarnath Temple of Shiva
- The Janmashtmi and the Durga Puja festivals are celebrated in Maibi.
- Major Durga Puja was celebrated on historical land at Braham Asthan Biharpur
