= Mahrail =

Village in Bihar, India

Mahrail Mahrail
- Village
- Interactive map of Mahrail
- Coordinates: 26.296389°N 86.270717°E
- Country: India
- State: Bihar
- District: Madhubani
- Block: Andhratharhi

Population
  - Total: 800
- Postal code: 847404
- ISO 3166 code: IN-BR

Mahrail is a village in the Madhubani district in Bihar, India. It is one of the 48 villages in the Andhratharhi Block of the Madhubani district. According to government records, the village has a population of 30,800 and comprises 3,526 households.

Mahrain is situated on the banks of the Kamala River. The village is home to several schools and is traversed by National Highway 57. Jhanjharpur, a nearby town, is 4 kilometres (2.5 miles) from the Mahrain railway station. Both railway and bus services are available for commuting to the village.

The total geographical area of Mahrain is 1,562 hectares (3,860 acres).

The village is renowned for its cricket tournament.

== Population ==
Mahrain's population is 30,800, with 15,200 males and 15,600 females. There are 4,280 children aged between 0 and 6 years, of whom 2,612 are boys and 2,315 are girls.

== Literacy ==
The literacy rate in Mahrain village stands at 78%. Out of the total population of 30,800, 24,024 individuals are literate. The male literacy rate is 70%, while the female literacy rate is 68%.

Schools:

- Aadya Devi Prathmik Sah Madhya Sanskrit School
- P L K Sanstrit high School Mahrail Rajkiya Madhya Vidyalaya Primary School
- Rajkiya Uchya High School

College:

- Kirti narayan Kamakhya Sanskrit Mahavidyalaya Mahrail

== Employment ==
Employed individuals constitute 71% of the village's population. Approximately 5% of the total population is entirely dependent on farming. The majority of the population is engaged in agricultural activities.

== History ==
In 1988, Mahrain village was devastated by the Bihar earthquake. At that time, the population exceeded 10,000.
