= Imadpatti =

- village
- Location in Bihar, India
- Coordinates: 26°27′N 86°27′E
- Country: India
- State: Bihar
- Region: Mithila
- District: Madhubani

Area
  - Total: 1.234 km^{2} (0.476 sq mi)
- Elevation: 58 m (190 ft)

Population (2011)
  - Total: 1,694
  - Density: 1,373/km^{2} (3,555/sq mi)

Languages
  - Official: Maithili, Hindi
- Time zone: UTC+5:30 (IST)
- PIN: 847404
- Telephone code: +91-06273

Imadpatti is a village in Jhanjharpur block of Madhubani District of Bihar. It falls under Jhanjharpur assembly constituency, represented by Nitish Mishra. It falls under Jhanjharpur Lok Shabha constituency, represented by Ramprit Mandal. Census location code for Imadpatti is 220703. The total area of the village is 123.4 hectares, 58.7 hectares of which is under non-agricultural usage, 8.8 hectares is culturable waste-land, 55.9 hectares is net area sown. The surrounding villages are Walipur, Khaira and Banaur.

== Administration ==
Imadpatti has Village Gram Panchayat. It comes under Jhanjharpur block and Madhubani district.

== Demography ==
As per 2011 Census, Imadpatti has a population of 1694 of which 808 (47.7%) are female and 886 male. It has 359 households. Literacy rate is 52.41% (64.58% for males, and 38.9% for females).

== Education ==
Imadpatti has a Government Middle School. The nearest Government Secondary School is at Khaira-Shivottar which is at a distance of 3 km.

== Climate ==
Climate is warm from April till September. Maximum temperature is experienced in May of 30.1 °C and minimum of 16.3 °C in January. The variation in temperature throughout the year is 13.8 °C. Monsoon rain is received in months of June, July, August and September. Maximum precipitation of 289mm is received in July.
