= Subodh Narayan Yadav =

Indian politician

- Born: Madhubani, Bengal presidency
- Died: Madhubani, Bihar
- Occupation: Politician

Subodh Narayan Yadav was an Indian politician.He was elected as a member of Bihar Legislative Assembly from (Benipatti East, Benipatti) constituency, Bihar.
