= Bardepur =

Village under Kaluahi block of Madhubani district in Bihar, India

Coordinates: 26°30′17.1″N 86°4′25.1″E

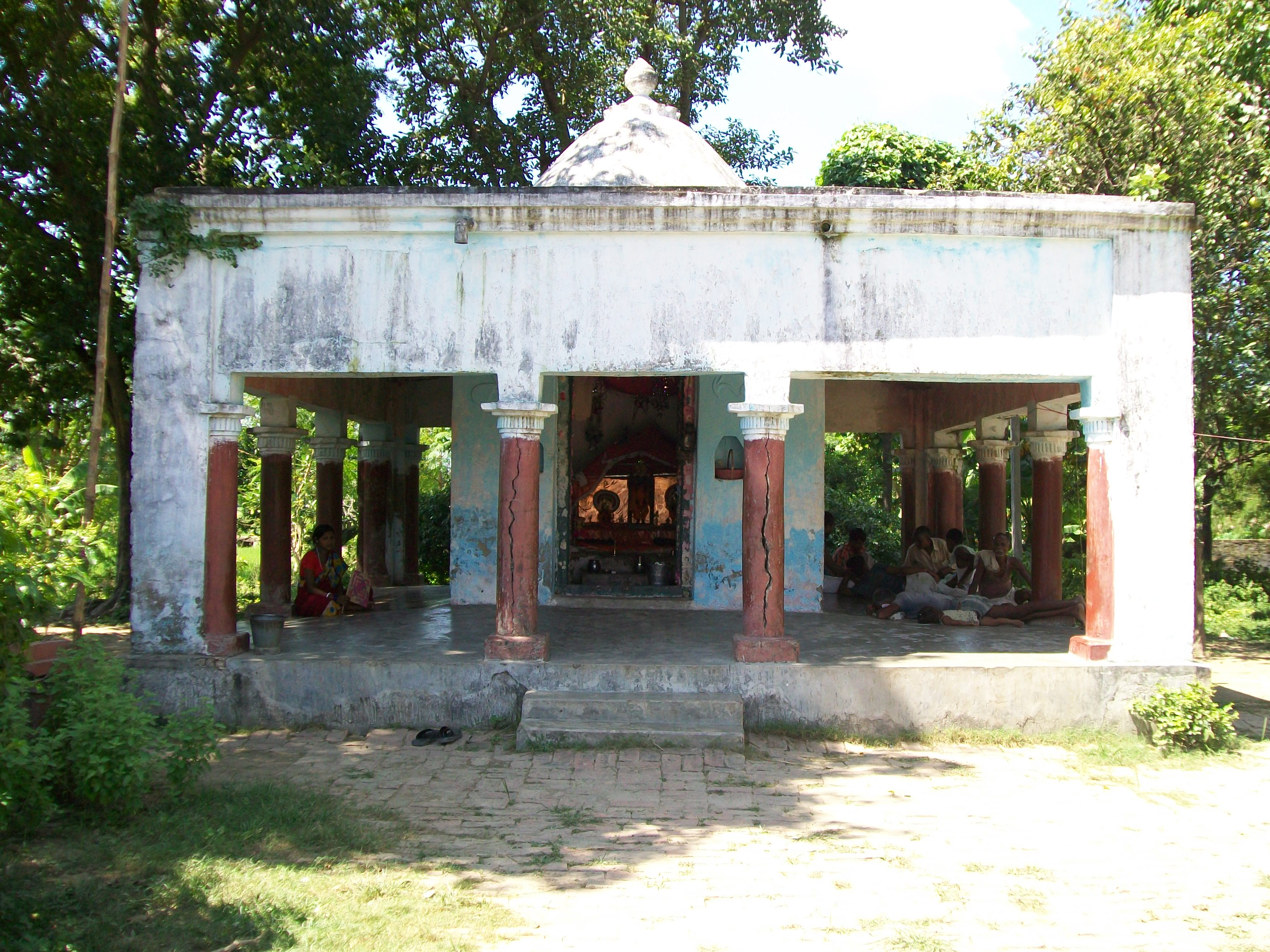
An ancient temple in Bardepur

Bardepur is a small village in the Kaluahi Block in the Madhubani District of the Indian state of Bihar. It is located on National Highway 105 (Darbhanga to Jainagar).

Geographically it is surrounded by a small and seasonal stream that is considered by the locals to be an origin point of the Jeevachh river. It is located 18 km north of Madhubani, 4 km from Kaluahi, and 159 km from Patna. The nearest train station to the village is in Jainagar.

The primary languages spoken in Bardepur are Maithili, Hindi, and Urdu. The village used to be well known for its cattle market, which led to it receiving the nickname Baradaha, derived from Baradahaat. The first syllable of Baredepur, Barde, is derived from this. The second syllable, pur, is the Sanskrit word for village or town.

As of the census of 2001, the population of this village was approximately 2000.
