= Rajaur =

Village in Bihar, India

Rajaur Village is situated on the bank of River Kamla in Jhanjharpur tehsil of Madhubani district. The population of the village is approximately 2500. It is in Baghwanpur PanchyatWard No 1.

The nearest village is Thengha, and the nearest police station and market are in Madhepur. In this village there are markets on the afternoons of Tuesday and Friday.

== Culture ==
In this Village there are three temples: Baba Vishwnath Mandir, Hanuman Mandir and a Seeta shrine. A Festival occurs in the Month of Kartik name as Kartik Kuwanr every year. The 'Chhath Pooja' is organised by all communities of the village

== Demographics ==
The village hosts communities including Maithil Brahmin, Barai, Suri, Taili and Harijans.

== Education ==
The village has Primary school

== Transport ==
The area has one Texi stand near Kamla Bandh

== Economy ==
Mostly people are farmers
