= Bhoj Pandaul =

BhojPandaul or Bhojparaul Simri-Bhojpandaul, simri-bhojparaul
- village
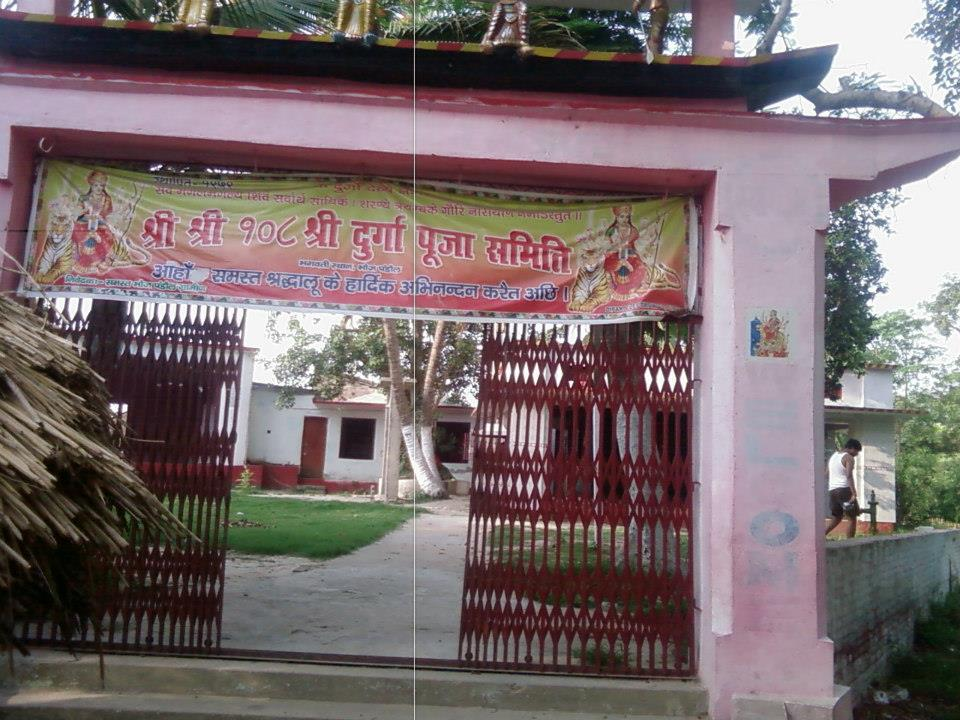
- Shri-Shri 108 Durga Sthan, Entrance Gate, Dakshinbai tole

- Location in Bihar, India
- Coordinates: 26°21′2″N 85°57′36″E
- Country: India
- State: Bihar
- Region: Mithila
- District: Madhubani

Area
  - Total: 5 km^{2} (1.9 sq mi)

Population (2015-2016)
  - Total: 8,000 Approximate
  - Rank: 2nd in Madhubani Dist. after Malmal Village
  - Density: 1,600/km^{2} (4,100/sq mi)

Languages
  - Official: Maithili, Hindi
- Time zone: UTC+5:30 (IST)
- PIN: 847121
- Telephone code: +919584466509
- ISO 3166 code: IN-BR
- Vehicle registration: BR 32
- Coastline: 0 kilometres (0 mi)
- Nearest city: Madhubani
- Sex ratio: 51:49 ♂/♀
- Literacy: 75%%
- Lok Sabha constituency: Madhubani
- Vidhan Sabha constituency: Bisfi
- Current M.L.A.: Dr. Haribhushan Thakur (BJP)
- Climate: Normal (Köppen)

Bhoj Pandaul or Bhojparaul is a village situated around 15 km from Madhubani, district headquarters of Madhubani district, Bihar state, India.

The village has an area of 5 square kilometers and a population of approximately 8,000. It is in the Bisfi Block and Bhojpandaul Panchayat.
