= Nabtol =

- village
- Interactive map of Nabtol
- Coordinates: 26°18′11.5″N 86°14′05″E
- Country: India
- State: Bihar
- District: Madhubani

Languages
  - Official: Hindi, Maithili
- Time zone: IST

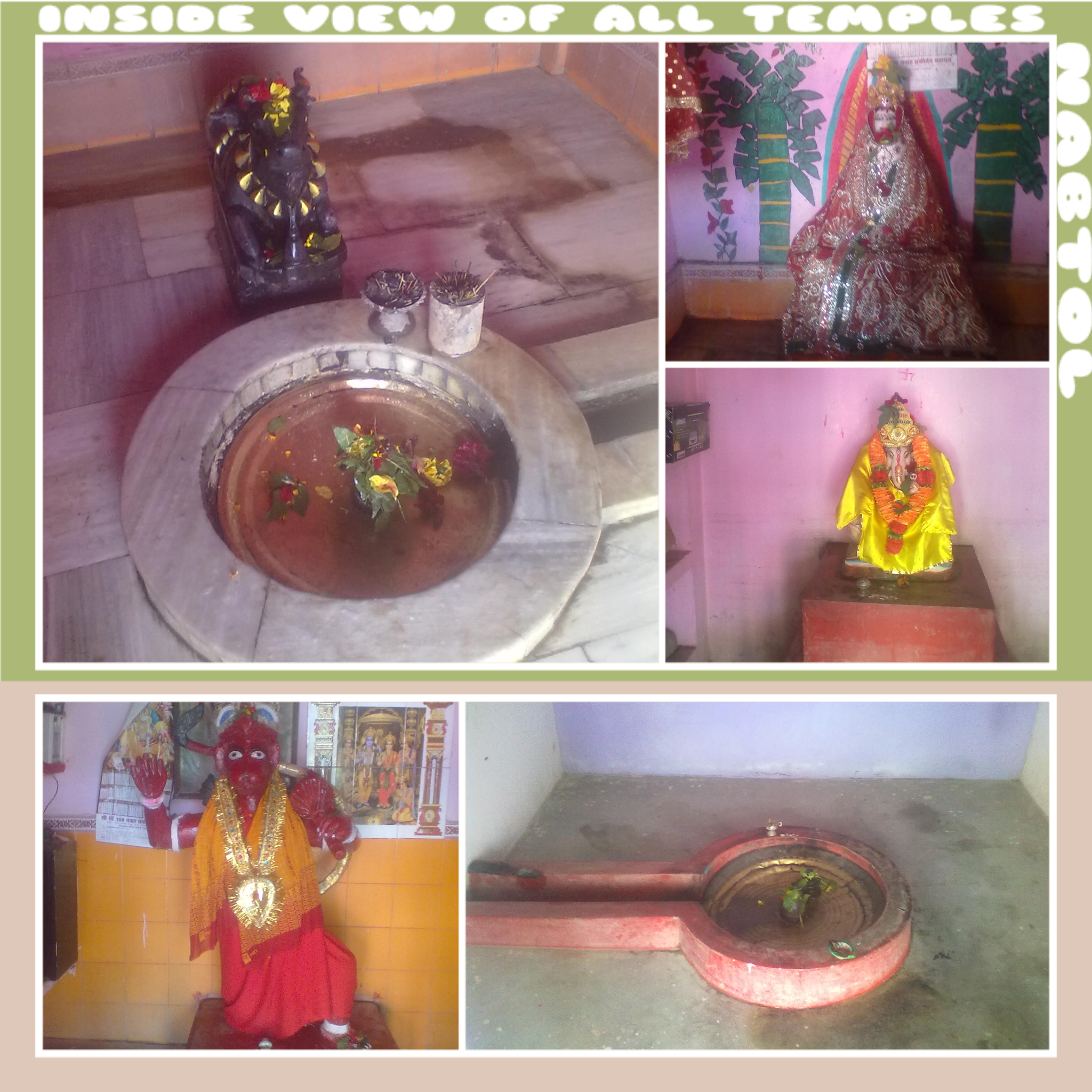
Inside view of all the five temples in Nabtol.

Nabtol is a village in northern Bihar, India. It is situated in Jhanjharpur Block of Madhubani District in the Indian State of Bihar. The village is near National Highway 527A, and is only 3 kilometer from National Highway 27. Its PIN code is 847404.

Nearby villages include Bharam, Kothia, Menhat, Narayanpur, Shankarpur, Gopalpur, and Pattitol. The nearest railway station is Lohna Road Railway Station. The nearest police station is Bhairav Sthan Police Station. The nearest hospital is Darbhanga Medical College and Hospital (DMCH). This village is on the banks of Kamala River.

This village and nearby areas are prone to annual flooding. The Koshi river is believed to be flowing through this village several years back, however due to consecutive floods the river changed its course of flow.

Maithili is the local language of the village. The village is small, but has a mixed culture, a boon for the village. The temples of Shiva, Parvati, Ganesha, Hanuman, and Bhairava are situated in this village. The village deity is named Dihvaar Baba.

Village includes a Primary Government School, a Middle Government School, and Bharam High School. There are no colleges or universities in this village, students seeking higher education move to the cities.

People in this village earn their livelihood directly or indirectly from agriculture, primary crops being Rice and Wheat. The village is also known for its mango orchards. There are some ponds that are the sources of fisheries for local consumers. A considerable number of people have migrated from the village in search of better education and livelihood to cities across India.
