= University of ancient Lohana =

Ancient university at Lohana

- लोहना विश्वविद्यालय (Maithili)
- Location: Lohana village, Madhubani district, Bihar, India
- Region: Mithila region
- Part of: Ancient universities in Indian Subcontinent

The University of ancient Lohana was a learning centre of Sanskrit education in the Mithila region of the Indian subcontinent. It was located at the Lohana village in the Madhubani district of Bihar. It was destroyed during the British rule in India. The ruins of the ancient university still exist in the village of Lohana. There is a small railway station known as Lohana Road Station near the site of the ruins. Presently there is a Sanskrit College on the site of the ruins which was built and patronised by the king of Raj Darbhanga.

== History ==
According to the historians, Mithila was ruled by Hindu rulers during the period Muslim rule in the northern part of India. During this period, the village of Lohana emerged as a prominent center of Sanskrit education in the patronages of the Brahmins kings of Mithila. It is said that when the universities of Nalanda and Vikramshila were destroyed by the Muslim invaders, then the village of Lohana became the shelter for the Sanskrit scholars who fled from Nalanda and Vikramshila. After that the learning centre of the Lohana village took the form of a university. The Sanskrit scholars from different parts of the Indian subcontinent flocked to the university of Lohana for learning Sanskrit education.

After the arrival of British rule in the sub-continent, when the British rulers took control on the Bengal presidency, then they felt the university of Lohana as an obstacle for expansion of the western culture and the British rule in the region of Mithila. So the British rulers destroyed the university of Lohana and converted it into ruins. Later the university of Lohana gradually disappeared.
