= Baruar, Hardoi district =

Baruar is a village in Hardoi district of Uttar Pradesh state, India. According to the 2011 census of India, it had a population of 1,003 people (532 males; 471 females).
