= Lohna, Himachal Pradesh =

Coordinates: 32.1198°N 76.5418°E

Lohna is a village situated in Palampur, Himachal Pradesh in Kangra district of India.
