= Nahari, Madhubani =

Village in Bihar, India

Nahari
- Village
- Location in Bihar, India Nahari (India)
- Coordinates: 26.493240°N 86.444869°E
- Country: India
- State: Bihar
- Division: Darbhanga division
- District: Madhubani district
- Block: Khutauna
- Time zone: UTC+5:30 (IST)
- Nearest city: Khutauna
- Lok Sabha constituency: Jhanjharpur
- Vidhan Sabha constituency: Laukaha

Nahari is a village in the Khutauna block in the Madhubani district of Bihar in India. There are six villages under Nahari panchayat and they include Bela, Donwari, Sihula, Purvitola, Badi Uthba and Choti Udhba. Nahari is located 6 km from Khutauna, near the Nepalese Border. It belongs to the Darbhanga division. The middle schools and the high schools in the village make an education available to local children. There are also many private English schools. Durga Puja is celebrated in Nahari Chowka and is the biggest festival of the year. Muharram is also famous and is celebrated in Nahari Panchayat. There are many castes in the village such as: Kushwaha, Paswan, Salhaita, Jha, Thakur, and Muslim.
