= Trimuhan =

Village in Madhubani district

- Village
- Trimuhan
- Interactive map of Trimuhan
- Country: India
- State: Bihar
- Region: Mithila
- Division: Darbhanga
- District: Madhubani
- Subdivision: Benipatti
- Block: Madhwapur
- Demonym: Maithil

Language
  - Official: Hindi

Regional languages
  - Mother tongue: Ancient: Maithili; Sanskrit

Trimuhan is a village in the Mithila region of Bihar in India. It is located in the Madhwapur block of the Madhubani district in Bihar. It is a flood prone village, since it is situated near the bank of the Dhouns river. The mother tongue of the village is Maithili. The village of Trimuhan is connected by State Highway 75 from Madhwapur to Darbhanga.
