= Bilat Paswan Vihangam =

Indian writer and politician

- Born: 1940 vill+Po-Eakhuttha, PS-Khutauna, Disst-Madhubani Bihar, India
- Died: October 5, 2017; Patna
- Occupations: Writer; Politician
- Known for: Hindi & Maithili literature
- Spouse: late Bhulkun Devi
- Parent: late Bhutai Paswan
- Awards: Padma Shri

Bilat Paswan, who wrote under the pen name Vihangam, was an Indian writer and politician, known for his writings in Hindi & Maithili literature. He was a former chairman of Bihar Public Service Commission & former chairman of Bihar Inter University Board. Born in 1940 to Bhutai Paswan in Bihar, he represented Rajnagar (Vidhan Sabha constituency) at the Bihar Legislative Assembly for two terms in 1968 and 1972 & Khajauli (Vidhan Sabha constituency) at the Bihar Legislative Assembly for two terms in 1985 and 1990, contesting under Indian National Congress candidature, defeating Ram Lakhan Ram of the Communist Party of India on both the elections. He also contested two elections unsuccessfully, in 1980 and 2000. The Government of India awarded him the fourth highest civilian honour of the Padma Shri, in 2005, for his contributions to literature.

== See also ==
- Maithili literature
