= Public Health Engineering Department =

The Public Health Engineering Department (PHED) is a public agency in Pakistan and India that is responsible for rural water supply.

During natural disasters the agency has the responsibility to get drinking water to the public as well as collaborating with aid organisations for this purpose. For example, during a cyclone in Sindh in 2007 PHED submitted a proposal to UNICEF for a permanent solution to clean drinking water Sibi District. The agency also coordinated relief efforts with UNICEF in Ziarat District during the 2008 earthquake.

Historically the PHED had been responsible for all water and sanitation projects at the district level, however following the devolution of 2001 become subordinate to elected nazims at district and tehsil level.
