= Vinod Narayan Jha =

Indian politician

Minister of Public Health Engineering Department Government of Bihar
- In office 29 July 2017 – 16 November 2020
- Chief Minister: Nitish Kumar
- Preceded by: Krishnanandan Prasad Verma
- Succeeded by: Ram Prit Paswan

Member of Bihar Legislative Assembly
- Incumbent
- Assumed office 2020
- Preceded by: Bhawana Jha
- Constituency: Benipatti
- In office 2010–2015
- Preceded by: Shaligram Yadav
- Succeeded by: Bhawana Jha
- Constituency: Benipatti
- In office 2005–2010
- Preceded by: Naiyar Azam
- Succeeded by: constituency defunct
- Constituency: Pandaul

Member of Bihar Legislative Council
- In office 3 June 2016 – 11 November 2020
- Succeeded by: Mukesh Sahani
- Constituency: elected by Legislative Assembly members

Personal details
- Born: 28 February 1957 (age 69) Ghonghour, Madhubani, Bihar
- Party: Bharatiya Janata Party
- Spouse: Smt Meena Jha
- Children: Son – Vibhay Kumar Jha & 2 daughters

Vinod Narayan Jha is an Indian politician and currently cabinet minister of PHED department, Government of Bihar. He has served as vice-president and chief spokesperson of Bharatiya Janata Party in Bihar. On 3 June 2016 he was elected unopposed to the Bihar Legislative Council and served as cabinet minister in Government of Bihar.

== Political career ==
He is one of the senior most politicians from Bihar who participated actively in Jayaprakash Narayan – Bihar Movement. He was jailed for three months in Buxar central jail as political prisoner. On the invitation of American council of young political leaders he visited America to cover George H. W. Bush presidential election and travelled eleven states of United States to participate in Democratic Party (United States) conferences.

== Minister of Public Health Engineering Department ==
He is known for successful implementation of comprehensive "Nal Jal Yojna – हर घर नल-हर घर जल" and his commitment on providing Arsenic-free water across Bihar by 2020. He created a controversy in 2019 General elections in India by stating only beauty can win the election referring to Priyanka Gandhi. Under his tenure 110 quality-testing labs across its 38 districts were set up and arrangements were made to provide drinking water from the surface of Ganges instead of sourcing from underground water. As a minister of PHED, he campaigned for mass awareness on water quality and ensured that all citizens can get certificate about quality of drinking water within 24 hours of submitting samples. His effort on maintaining water hygiene and consuming clean drinking water among all people of the state was appreciated by many established NGOs in the region.

=== Positions held ===
- Cabinet minister – Public Health Engineering Department – Government of Bihar
- Vice President -: Bharatiya Janata Party – Bihar State (2000 to 2003).
- Chief Spokesperson: Bharatiya Janata Party- Bihar State (2006 to 2010).
- Member of the Legislative Assembly – Pandaul Constituency – 79 ( Madhubani, Bihar ). (2005 to 2010).
- Member of the Legislative Assembly – Benipatti Constituency – 32, ( Madhubani, Bihar ).
- Member : National Council – Bharatiya Janata Party
- Vice Chairman- : Bihar State Textbook Publishing Corporation Ltd, Patna.
- Director – : Saran Engineering Company, Ministry of Textiles Government of India (1990 to 1995).
- Member-: Hindi Salahkar Samiti , Ministry of Power and Renewable Energy, Government of India (1998 to 2000).
