= Navtol =

Coordinates: 26°14′13.43″N 86°09′12.59″E

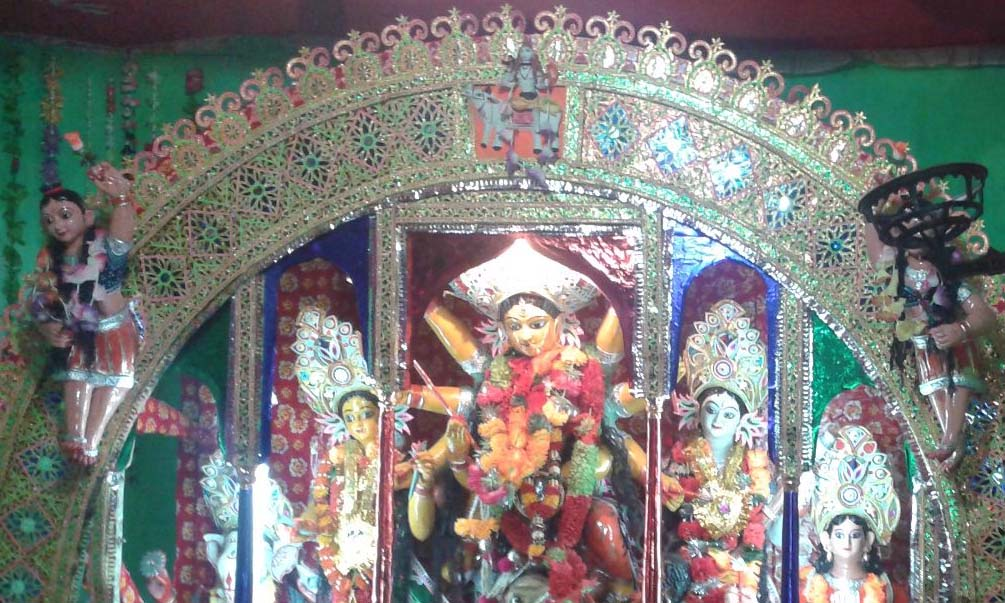
Navtol Durga

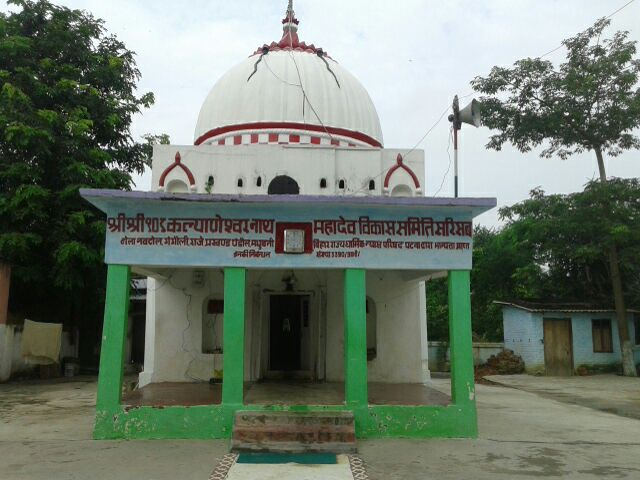
Shiv temple Navtol

Navtol is a small village of sarisab-pahi west panchayat of Pandaul block in Madhubani district of Bihar State in India. It is located 1.5 kilometres north of National Highway-57, Ganguli chawk. The village Navtol "Sarisabpahi" is situated at 16–17 kilometers south-east from district headquarters (Madhubani), in Darbhanga commissionary of state Bihar. It is an important Tola of revenue village Sarisab alise Sarisab-pahi. Now there are two Panchayats, Sarisab-pahi to the East and Sarisab-pahi to the West. Other Tolas are Pahitol and Bitthotol. Total area of Navtol now is 1.5 km^{2}. The population of this village is 6500–7000. Hindi, Maithili and English are spoken and written in this area, Maithili being the main language of this village. And scripts of this village are Devnagari, Roman and Mithilakshar (tirhuta). Durga pooja celebrated in Navtol, every year in "Ashwin" since 1840 (1258 saal). It is near jhanjharpur railway station. This place is famous for durgapuja.

== History ==
According to Skanda Purana (Chapter 52, Shloka 6–7), Siddharth Kshetra is situated to 2 Yojan (16 mi) in Aagney kon (south-east) to Kapil Muni ashram Madhubani. Kapil Ashram is now known as Kapileshwar Sthan in Madhubani district. This place was the site of Brahmin practices and education center (Vidyamandir). It was the head of the center of Mithila Nyayvishesh. The ancient name of Sarisabpahi was Siddharth Kshetra according to Brihad Vishnupuran and Skand Puran
