= Nagdah Balain, Madhubani =

Nagdah Balain
- Village
- Location in Bihar, India Nagdah Balain (India)
- Coordinates: 26.25°N 86.0°E
- Country: India
- State: Bihar
- District: Madhubani
- Elevation: 56 m (184 ft)

Population (2011)
  - Total: 8,658

Languages
  - Official: Maithili, Hindi
- Time zone: UTC+5:30 (IST)
- Postal code: 847222
- Telephone code: 06276
- ISO 3166 code: IN-BR
- Sex ratio: 1000/942 ♂/♀
- Lok Sabha constituency: Madhubani
- Vidhan Sabha constituency: Madhubani, Bisfi

Nagdah Balain, also known simply as Nagdah, is located in Madhubani District, Bihar in India.

Nagdah is surrounded by four lakes, and is located three kilometers from Kapsiya, and two kilometers from Arer, Madhubani, Bihar. Nagdah's Pin Code is 847222.

Nagdah village contains the Durga Temple. The Durga Puja festival is a festival celebrated in Nagdah village in October and March, during which the "Natak" is played by local boys, at the direction of the senior residents of the village. Vidaya Pati Samroh is another celebration held in Nagdah.

This village is also known by the name of its great son Dr. Subhadra Jha (9 July 1909 - 13 May 2000) . He was a famous linguist cum polyglot(he knew more than 18 languages) and was Sahitya Academy Awardee for Maithili Literature. He was the first D.Litt. in Bihar. Later he earned 2nd D.Lit from University of Paris. He was the first foreign invitee to visit Germany after WWII. He wrote several books and stories in different languages. Another famous person of this village is Shri Budhi Nath Jha known for his creation of Om Mahabharath which is first ever epic on Maithili literature.

== Geography ==
Nagdah is located at 26.25°N 86.0°E.

== Language and culture ==
- Maithili is the main language, while Hindi, English and Urdu are also spoken.

== Places of interest ==
The 3 most popular Durga temples in Madhubani are Raj Rajeshwari Mandir (in Dokhar), Bhagwati Temple (in Nagdah) and Maata Durga Mandir ( in Uchaith).( Bharam Sathan in ) Raja Mandal
