= Baruar, Kaimur district =

Baruar is a village in Kaimur district of Bihar state, India. According to the 2011 census of India, the population was 506 people (250 males; 256 females).
