= Sudai =

Coordinates: 26°18′N 86°24′E

- Village
- Interactive map of Sudai
- Country: India
- State: Bihar
- District: Madhubani
- Named for: Shailesh Mishra (Mishra_shailesh)

Languages
  - Official: Maithili, Hindi
- Time zone: UTC+5:30 (IST)
- ISO 3166 code: IN-BR

Sudai is a village in the Madhubani district in the Indian state of Bihar.

Notable people from Sudai include Jagannath Mishra, Member of Parliament of the 5th Lok Sabha (1971–1977).

== See also ==
- Madhubani, India
- Bihar, India
- India
