= Yogeshwar Jha =

Former state education minister of Bihar Government

Prof Yugeshwar Jha
- प्रो युगेश्वर झा
- Born: 24 June 1944; Basuki Bihari
- Died: 9 July 2008; IGIMS, Patna
- Citizenship: Indian
- Education: M. Sc (Physics)
- Alma mater: Langat Singh College, Bihar University
- Occupations: Professor, Minister and Political Leader
- Political party: Indian National Congress
- Father: Shree Sushil Jha

Yugeshwar Jha (Maithili: युगेश्वर झा) was a former state education minister in the Jagarnath Mishra's cabinet of Bihar Government .

== Early life ==
As per the record of the Bihar Vidhan Sabha, Yogeshwar Jha was born on 3 January 1944 in Basuki Bihari North village of Madhubani district in the Mithila region of Bihar. He was born in a middle-class family of Maithil Brahmins. His father name was Shree Sushil Jha. His father was a farmer or agriculturist.

== Academic career ==
Yogeshwar Jha completed his post graduation (Master of Science) education from Langat Singh College, Muzaffarpur. He was specialised in the subject of physics. He started his academic career as a professor of physics department in the same college. It is said that he was an eminent educationist. Later he also served as secretary of Ram Niranjan Janta College at Madhwapur in the Madhubani district.

== Political career ==
Yogeshwar Jha was considered a hardworking social worker who never compromised with the circumstances, and even his opponents praised him. He had good relations with the chief minister Jagarnath Mishra of Bihar in India. He focused on the development of the Mithila region.

It is said that Yogeshwar Jha came into political limelight during 1981-1982 from an movement originated in Chanpura village of Benipatti subdivision in Madhubani district for construction of a ring dam around the village. He was elected as MLA of Benipatti assembly constituency four times. In the year 1980, he was first time elected as an MLA from the Benipatti assembly constituency. After that in the years 1985 and 1990, he was continuously elected as the MLA of the assembly constituency. He became the state minister of education during 1990 in cabinet of Jagarnath Mishra's government in Bihar.

In the year 1995, he lost the election in the hand of independent candidate Shaligram Yadav. In the year 2005, Yogeshwar Jha was again elected as the MLA of the Benipatti assembly constituency. But due to non achievement of the majority figure by his political alliance in the legislative assembly of the state, government was not formed in the state and finally re-election was conducted in the month of October in the same year. In this re-election, Yogeshwar Jha lost his assembly membership by his opponent candidate Shaligram Yadav.

== Legacy ==
In the year 1982-83, Yogeshwar Jha built the building of the public library called as Adarsh Pustakalaya at Tyauth village in the Benipatti sub-division. After his death, every year his birth anniversary is celebrated as Yogeshwar Jayanti in the region of Benipatti sub-division in the Madhubani district of Bihar. Similarly his death anniversary is also remembered. On this day, some political leaders give speeches to praise him. He was a prominent leader from the Mithila region in the state of Bihar, India.

The sub-divisional headquarter of the Indian National Congress party at Benipatti has been named as Yugeshwar Jha Ashram. It is located near Indira Chowk at the Benipatti Bazaar. There his memorial statue was installed, where different political leaders come to pay tribute by garlanding his statue on the occasion of his memorial day. Similarly, on 27 December 2011, in a meeting held at the premises of R N J College, Madhwapur under the chairmanship of the professor Modrif Nadaf, it was decided to install a marble statue of Yugeshwar Jha in the premises, since he was the former secretary of the college.

The political legacy of Yogeshwar Jha was carried out by his own daughter Bhawana Jha after his death. His daughter Bhawana Jha was elected as member of Bihar legislative assembly from the Benipatti assembly constituency in the year 2015.
