= Kapsiya =

Kapsiya is situated 13 km away from Madhubani District in Bihar State, India. It is one of the well known villages in Madhubani District. It belongs in Benipatti Block. Kapsiya is part of the Benipatti Vidhan Sabha electoral constituency. The local language is Maithili.

== Geography ==
Nearby places include: Loha, Pokhrauni, Saurath Sabha.
