= Gangdwar =

Village in Bihar, India

Gangdwar is a large village located in Andhratharhi Block of Madhubani district, Bihar, India with total 1,142 families residing. The Gangdwar village has population of 5,293 of which 2,831 are males while 2,462 are females as per Population Census 2011.

In Gangdwar village population of children with age 0-6 is 860 which makes up 16.25% of total population of village. Average Sex Ratio of Gangdwar village is 870 which is lower than Bihar state average of 918. Child Sex Ratio for the Gangdwar as per census is 842, lower than Bihar average of 935.

Gangdwar village has lower literacy rate compared to Bihar. In 2011, literacy rate of Gangdwar village was 56.42% compared to 61.80% of Bihar. In Gangdwar Male literacy stands at 67.81% while female literacy rate was 43.40%.

As per constitution of India and Panchyati Raaj Act, Gangdwar village is administrated by Sarpanch (Head of Village) who is elected representative of village.

- Gangdwar Data

Particulars	Total	Male	Female
Total No. of Houses	1,142	-	-
Population	5,293	2,831	2,462
Child (0–6)	860	467	393
Schedule Caste	1,113	590	523
Schedule Tribe	5	2	3
Literacy	56.42%	67.81%	43.40%
Total Workers	2,311	1,396	915
Main Worker	1,467	33,357	0
Marginal Worker	844	443	401
