= Rajnagar, Bihar Assembly constituency =

Coordinates: 26°24′N 86°11′E

Rajnagar, Bihar
- Constituency No. 37 for the Bihar Legislative Assembly

Constituency details
- Country: India
- Region: East India
- State: Bihar
- District: Madhubani
- Established: 1967
- Total electors: 313,288
- Reservation: SC

Member of Legislative Assembly
- 18th Bihar Legislative Assembly
- Incumbent Sujit Paswan
- Party: BJP
- Alliance: NDA
- Elected year: 2025

Rajnagar Assembly constituency is an assembly constituency in Madhubani district in the Indian state of Bihar. It is reserved for scheduled castes.

== Overview ==
As per Delimitation of Parliamentary and Assembly constituencies Order, 2008, No. 37 Rajnagar Assembly constituency is composed of the following: Rajnagar and Andhratharhi community development blocks.

Rajnagar Assembly constituency is part of No. 7 Jhanjharpur (Lok Sabha constituency).

== Members of the Legislative Assembly ==
Year	Name	Party
1967	Ram Krishna Mahato	Indian National Congress
1969	Bilat Paswan Vihangam	Indian National Congress
1972	Bilat Paswan Vihangam	Indian National Congress
1977-2008: Constituency defunct
2010	Ram Lakhan Ram Raman	Rashtriya Janata Dal
2014^	Ramawtar Paswan	Rashtriya Janata Dal
2015	Ram Prit Paswan	Bharatiya Janata Party
2020	Ram Prit Paswan	Bharatiya Janata Party
2025	Sujit Paswan	Bharatiya Janata Party

== Election results ==
=== 2025 ===
2025 Bihar Legislative Assembly election: Rajnagar
Party	Candidate	Votes	%	±%
BJP	Sujit Paswan	108,362	56.79	+5.37
RJD	Bishnu Deo Mochi	66,177	34.68	−5.75
JSP	Surendra Kumar Das	5,669	2.97	
Aam Janta Pragati Party	Rampari Devi	3,568	1.87	
Bhartiya Chetna Party	Maheshwar Paswan	1,838	0.96	
NOTA	None of the above	2,889	1.51	−0.96
Majority		42,185	22.11	+11.12
Turnout		190,800	60.9	+8.37
BJP hold		Swing		

=== 2020 ===
In the Bihar Legislative Assembly election of 2015, the Communist Party of India (CPI) won Rajnagar seat by defeating rival Ramavtar Paswan of RJD.

2020 Bihar Legislative Assembly election: Rajnagar
Party	Candidate	Votes	%	±%
BJP	Ram Prit Paswan	89,459	51.42	▲5.19
RJD	Ramawatar Paswan	70,338	40.43	▼1.77
Independent	Rakesh Kumar	2,017	1.16	▼0.31
Voters Party International	Raja Ram Chaupal	1,612	0.93	
Jago Hindustan Party	Arun Kumar Mandal	1,600	0.92	
NOTA	None of the above	4,303	2.47	▲0.24
Majority		19,121	10.99	▲6.96
Turnout		173,977	52.53	▲0.33
BJP hold		Swing		

=== 2015 ===
2015 Bihar Legislative Assembly election: Rajnagar
Party	Candidate	Votes	%	±%
BJP	Ram Prit Paswan	71,614	46.23	
RJD	Ramawatar Paswan	65,372	42.2	
BSP	Maheswar Ram	2,650	1.71	
Independent	Rakesh Kumar	2,271	1.47	
Independent	Vishnath Paswan	2,029	1.31	
CPI(ML)L	Utim Paswan	1,945	1.26	
NOTA	None of the above	3,447	2.23	
Majority		6,242	4.03	
Turnout		154,905	52.2	
