= Bijlipur, India =

Bijlipur
- Village
- Location in Bihar, India Bijlipur (India)
- Coordinates: 26.13°N 86.20°E
- Country: India
- State: Bihar
- Region: Mithila
- District: Madhubani
- Elevation: 59 m (194 ft)

Population (2001)
  - Total: 1,002

Languages
  - Official: Maithili, Hindi
- Time zone: UTC+5:30 (IST)
- PIN: 847404
- Telephone code: 06273

Bijlipur is a small village and a notified area in Berma Panchayat, Kachua post, Madhepur thana in the Madhubani district in the Indian state of Bihar, India.

== Geography ==
Bijlipur located at 26.27°N 86.28°E. It has an average elevation of 59 metres (193 feet). Bijlipur is a small village located near the Tamoria Railway station, Deep Halt and Jhanjharpur City. In the British time this village name was Laxmipur. This village is surrounded by many roads to protect from flood. If the flood water came in the village that means all near village & city totally dipped with flood water.

== Demographics ==
This is a small village with different community of people living here. Main communities are Barai, Yadav, Taili, Kanwar.

== Economy ==
=== Agriculture ===
The main crops grown in this area are paddy rice, wheat, rice, paan, peas, makhana, mango, green vegetables, bamboos and sugar cane.

=== Markets ===
There are three important business hubs of the village Deep Halt market (4 kilometres (2.5 mi)), Jhanjharpur market (8 kilometres (5.0 mi)) and Madhepur market (12 kilometres (7.5 mi)).

== Tourist attractions ==
- Jattu Thakur Ji Gaon Dihwar Sthan
- Barre Sthan
- Garhiya Kalam
- Prachin Shiv temple Brari Tolla.
