= Lohna, Bihar =

Lohna Lohana
- Village
- Lohna
- Country: India
- State: Bihar
- Region: Mithila
- District: Madhubani
- Block: Jhanjharpur
- Named for: Lohni Bhagwati

Population (2011)
  - Total: 7,060
- Demonym: Maithil

Languages
  - Official language: Mother language: Hindi; Maithili

Lohna is a village situated in Jhanjharpur Block of Madhubani District in the Indian state of Bihar. It is well connected by road and railways. The nearest railway station is Lohna Road Station which is at distance of around 2 km from the village. Total area of the village is 2200 Bigha (About 880 Lac sq Feet). The river Lakshmana (Lakhandey) divides the village in two equal parts. The name Lohna came from Lohini Bhagwati which was on the bank of the river Lakshmana.

The village of Lohna is administratively divided into two gram panchyats. They are Lohna North and Lohna South gram panchayats.

== Demographics ==
According to the population census 2011, the total population of the village is 7,060. Out of the total population, 3572 are males and 3488 are females. The total number of households in the village is 1671.

== Description ==
A description about the village is given in "Skanda Purana". In the early period, the village was a major centre for Sanskrit and Vedic learning in Mithila. In the medieval period, the university of Lohana was famous for Sanskrit education. Later it was destroyed during the British empire in India. Presently a Sanskrit Mahavidyalay (College) is on the ruins of the university in the village, which is about to take its last breath. 60/70 years before it was a popular Sanskrit Mahavidyalay, 400 to 500 students were studying there. The diminished building is yet evidencing it. Several prominent personalities of the region belong to this village.

There is a Hindu shrine named Bideshwar Sthan. The presiding deity of the shrine is Lord Shiva. The temple of Lord Shiva is known as Videshwarnath Mahadev Mandir. In the campus of the shrine there is also a temple of Goddess Parvati. Gram Devata named Maksudan Baba is near Bideshwar Asthan. People also come here for worship and blessings rituals after Mundan and Upanayana of their sons.

The village is well connected by a national highway NH 57 and Lohna Road railway station.

Legendary poet Mahakavi Umapati (author of Rukmini Swember) was born in Lohna.

Postal Pin Code for Lohna(West) and Lohna(East) are 847424 & 847407 respectively.

On 24 April 2025, prime minister Narendra Modi arrived in the village to laid the foundation stone of several development projects in the region on the occasion of the National Panchayati Raj Day.
