= Ram Prit Paswan (Indian politician) =

Indian politician from Bihar

Minister of Public Health Engineering Department Government of Bihar
- In office 16 November 2020 – 9 August 2022
- Chief Minister: Nitish Kumar
- Preceded by: Vinod Narayan Jha

Member of Bihar Legislative Assembly
- In office 2015 term start2. =2020 – 2025
- Preceded by: Ramawatar Paswan
- Succeeded by: Sujit Paswan
- Constituency: Rajnagar
- In office 2005–2010
- Preceded by: Ram Lakhan Ram Raman
- Succeeded by: Arun Shankar Prasad
- Constituency: Khajauli

Personal details
- Born: 21 March 1963 (age 63)
- Party: Bharatiya Janata Party

Ram Prit Paswan (born 21 March 1963) is an Indian politician from Bihar. He is a two time MLA and also served as a minister of public health engineering department in the Government of Bihar. He won the 2020 Bihar Legislative Assembly election representing Bharatiya Janata Party from Rajnagar Assembly constituency which is reserved for Scheduled Caste community in Madhubani district.

== Early life and education ==
Paswan is from Rajnagar, Madhubani district, Bihar. He has a doctorate from Lalit Narayan Mithila University, Darbhanga.

== Career ==
Paswan first won as an MLA winning the Rajnagar seat in the 2015 Bihar Legislative Assembly election defeating Ramawatar Paswan of RJD. He won for a third time in 2020 election..He was also a Sabhapati (Zero Hour) of Bihar Legislative Assembly.
