= Siriyapur =

Siriyapur is a small village which is under the region of Madhubani district in Bihar, India. Madhubani district is well known for Mithila painting. It is historical palace which is well known by Mithila. This is the land of king Janaka who is the father of goddess Sita.

Siriyapur Village life is a mixture of tranquillity, serenity, quietude and innocence. Along with numerous small and big grass fields, one river (Bachharaja nadi), a famous temple (Mohan Baba Mandir. It is called the pride of Siriyapur. All the devotees who keep their vows sincerely in this temple, their wishes are fulfilled When the vow is fulfilled, there is a saint-bhandara of chura, curd and sugar.There is neither a priest nor a Bhandari in this temple, but still a Bhandara of 500 people is held here daily.) Speaking in a low voice the tale of languishment and love to the big and clear blue sky give a mesmerizing, captivating and bewitching effect to the similar Indian villages. A majority of the persons living in siriyapur village have involved themselves in agriculture and associated with teaching profession, and have thus made the country the educatedand empowers .

Geographical detail's

Locality Name : Siriyapur

Block Name : Basopatti

District : Madhubani

State : Bihar

Division : Darbhanga

Language : Maithili, Hindi, English

Time zone: IST (UTC+5:30)

Telephone Code / Std Code: 06246
