= Ram Naresh Pandey =

Indian politician

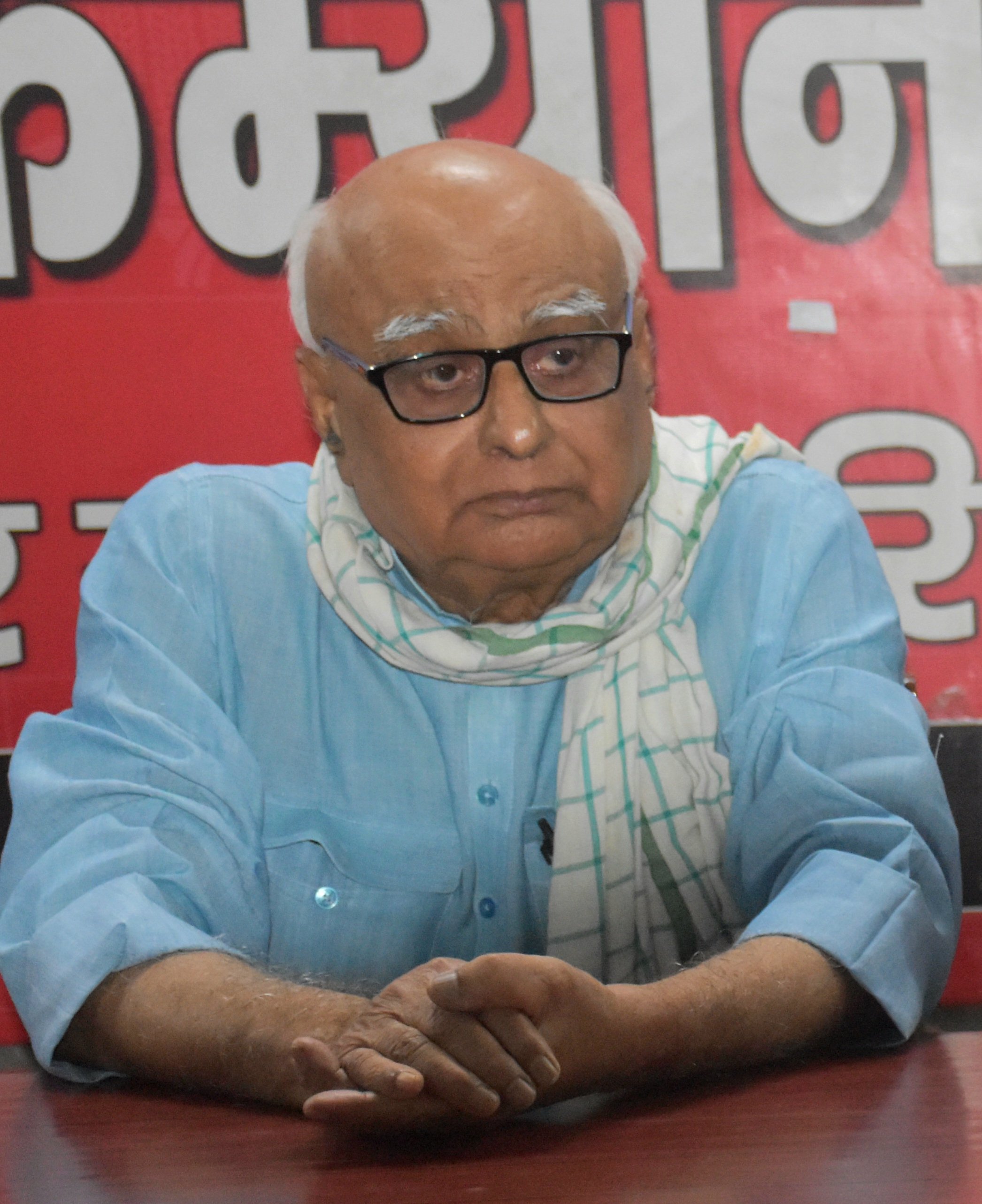

Member of Bihar Legislative Assembly
- In office 2005–2010
- Constituency: Harlakhi constituency

Personal details
- Party: Communist Party of India

Ram Naresh Pandey is an Indian politician and former member of the Bihar Legislative Assembly. He was the representative from the Harlakhi constituency from 2005–2010 as a member of the Communist Party of India. He is the state secretary of CPI Bihar state council and is a member of the National Executive of the Communist Party of India from Bihar.
