= Bijlipur, Punjab =

Bijlipur
- Village
- Location in Punjab, India Bijlipur (India)
- Coordinates: 30.842°N 76.112°E
- Country: India
- State: Punjab
- District: Ludhiana

Languages
  - Official: Punjabi
  - Regional: Punjabi
- Time zone: UTC+5:30 (IST)
- Nearest city: Samrala

Bijlipur is a noted village located in the Ludhiana district of Punjab, India. It's known for having the highest sex ratio in Punjab and was also mentioned on the Canadian radio channels for the same. The number of females is nearly double that of the males.

== Geography ==
The village is approximately centered at 30°50′31″N 76°06′43″E and located near Samrala (8 km). Kubba, Ghulal, Neelon Kalan and Neelon Khurd are the surrounding villages. 9 km from Doraha

== History ==
The village is named after a woman named BIJLEE, who was born in Village Lall Kalan(the neighbouring village) and was married in Sahaulli, in Ludhiana District. The parents having BIJLEE, their only daughter, gave all their own land to their son-in-law, who built a new village BIJLI PUR, named after his wife, BIJLEE

== Culture ==
Punjabi is the mother tongue as well as the official language here.

=== Religion ===
The people are mostly Sikhs, followers of Sikhism.

== Education ==
There is a primary school with girls making up more than 50% of the student body.
