= Malmal =

Village in Bihar, India

Coordinates: 26°29′N 86°03′E

- Coordinates

Malmal Village is a village in India, situated about 560 mi (or 902 km) east of New Delhi, the country's capital. It is situated 3 km from Kaluahi and approximately 17 km from Madhubani in the Indian state of Bihar.

Malmal is one of the largest of the 1,111 villages in Madhubani district. It has two Panchayats: North Malmal Village and South Malmal Village.

== Demographics ==
The population of the village is 21,153. The literacy rate is 87%, with a male literacy rate at 89.96% and a female literacy rate at 68.15%.
