= Bhairavsthan =

Coordinates: 28°55′N 81°26′E

Bhairavsthan भैरवस्थान
- Village development committee
- Interactive map of Bhairavsthan
- Country: Nepal
- Zone: Seti Zone
- District: Achham District

Population (2001)
  - Total: 3,486
  - Religions: Hindu
- Time zone: UTC+5:45 (Nepal Time)

Bhairavsthan is a village in Achham District in the Seti Zone of western Nepal. According to the 1991 Nepal census, the village had a population of 2869 living in 504 houses. At the time of the 2001 Nepal census, the population was 3486, of which 39% was literate.
