= Shibipatti =

Shibipatti is a village gram panchayat located in the Madhubani district of Bihar, India.
