= Laxmanaa Ganga River =

River in Mithila

Laxmanaa Ganga River Laxmanaa River
- Etymology: Laxmanaa Devi
- Nickname: Lakhandei River

Location
- Nation: India and Nepal
- State: Bihar and Madhesh Pradesh
- Geographical: Mithila region
- District: Dhanusha and Sitamarhi

Physical characteristics
- Mouth: Bagmati River
  - coordinates: 26°13′46″N 85°38′19″E

Laxmanaa Ganga (Maithili: लक्ष्मणा गंगा नदी) (also written as Lakshmanaa Ganga) is a river that flows on the plains of the Mithila region in the Indian subcontinent. It is simply called as Laxmanaa River. It originates from the Himalayan region in Nepal and flows on the plains of the Sitamarhi district in the Mithila region of Bihar in India. It is locally also known as Lakhandei River.

== Description ==
The Laxmanaa Ganga river is also a legendary river associated with the story of Goddess Sita in Ramayana. Laxmanaa Ganga Devi is a personified form of the river and believed to be the friend of Goddess Sita. The legendary description of the river can be traced from the local Hindu mythology.

The physical form of the river originates from the Himalayan region in Nepal and enters in India at Dularpur Ghat near Bharsar village of the Sonbarsa block in the Sitamarhi district of Bihar. The main part of the river lies in Nepal. In early times, this river used to flow eight to ten kilometers west of Lakshmipur from Sonbarsa and entered in India at Dulapur Ghat but later due to some construction in Nepal, the path of flow of the river changed. In Nepal, the main stream is filled with excessive silt. The direction of flow has changed due to no dredging since 1995–96 in Nepal. As a result, the course of the river changed in India too.

== Legends ==
According to legend, Laxmanaa Devi was one of the eight friends of the Goddess Sita. It is said in religious scriptures that before the manifestation of Goddess Sita, her eight friends came first on the earth. The names of her eight friends were Laxmanaa, Chandrakala, Charushila, Hema, Kshema, Saryu, Kamala and Doodhmati. Among the eight friends, Lakshmanaa Ganga incarnated in the form of Mahalakshmi to serve Goddess Sita. On the basis of holiness, Ganga is called Devi while Laxmanaa Ganga is Mahadevi herself.

=== Religious rituals ===
Everyday at evening, Laxmanaa Ganga Sandhya Aarti is being continuously performed by devotees at the bank of the river in Sitamarhi. The holy bank of the river, where the daily Laxmanaa Ganga Sandhya Aarti is performed is called as Sita Ghat. It is organised by Shree Sita Janmabhoomi Tirtha Kshetra Vikas Parishad. On the occasion of Guru Purnima some special prayers are also performed there. According to the local residents, Laxmanaa Ganga is first of all considered as Guru, so on the occasion of the Guru Purnima, a special Maha Aarti ritual dedicated to her is performed.

== Establishment of Idol ==
In the city of Sitamarhi, there is an area known as Laxmanaanagar named after the Goddess Laxmanaa Ganga. In the area of Laxmanaanagar, there is a shrine called as Peeli Kutti, where an idol of the personified form of the Goddess Laxmanaa Ganga Devi was installed around 1942 by the then Mahant Shri Ram Jagannath Sharanji Maharaj of the shrine.

It is believed that 80 years ago Shri Ram Jagannath Sharan Ji Maharaj in his night dream saw Goddess Lakshmanaa Ganga sitting on the river full of water. The old stream of the Lakshmanaa Ganga river had left its path and merged into the new stream. Then in the dream he saw Goddess Laxmanaa Ganga sitting on the water full in the old streams. And the Goddess said to him "I am here, don't worry, I am always in Sitamarhi". Next day in the morning, he called a sculptor and explained him the form of the Goddess Laxmanaa Ganga appeared in his dream. Then the sculptor installed the idol of the Goddess Lakshmanaa Ganga at the Peeli Kutti Mutt. After that the idol of the Goddess Laxmanaa Ganga is worshiped as a friend of Goddess Sita. In evening, Vandana and Aarti is devoted to her is performed. Symbolically, Goddess Lakshmanaa Ganga is the identity of Sitamarhi. It is believed that Goddess Sita still lives in Saket Lok with her eight friends.
