= Sitaram Yadav (politician, born 1952) =

Indian politician

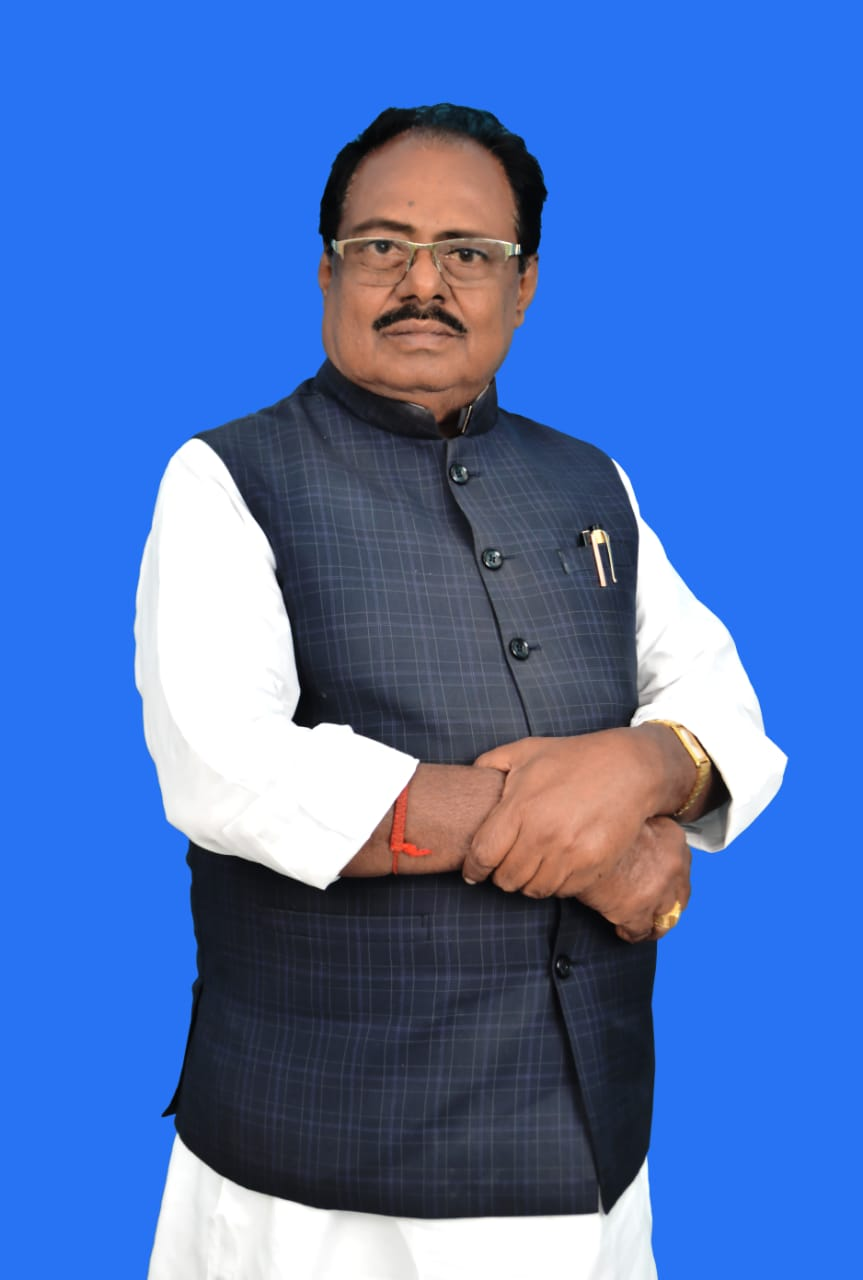
- Member of Bihar State Legislature

Member of Bihar Legislative Assembly
- In office 2015–2020
- Preceded by: Arun Shankar Prasad
- Succeeded by: Arun Shankar Prasad
- Constituency: Khajauli

Personal details
- Born: 14 April 1952 (age 74) Vill. Narkatia, Post. Madiya, PS. Basopatti, district-Madhubani, Bihar, India
- Party: Rashtriya Janata Dal
- Education: MA
- Profession: Politician

Sitaram Yadav is an Indian politician. He was elected to the Bihar Legislative Assembly from Khajauli in the 2015 as a member of the Rashtriya Janata Dal.
