= Pandaul =

Village in Bihar, India

- Village
- Location within Bihar Location within India
- Coordinates: 26°15′24″N 86°05′01″E
- Country: India
- State: Bihar
- District: Madhubani
- Block: Pandaul

Government
  - Type: Sarpanch

Area
  - Total: 10.65 km^{2} (4.11 sq mi)
- Elevation: 53 m (174 ft)

Population (2011)
  - Total: 32,689
  - Density: 3,069/km^{2} (7,950/sq mi)

Languages
  - Common: Maithili, Hindi
- Time zone: UTC+5:30 (IST)
- PIN: 847234
- STD code: 06276
- Vehicle registration: BR-32

Pandaul is a village and the administrative center of Pandaul Block, located in the southern portion of Madhubani District, Bihar, India. The village had a population of 32,689 in the 2011 census.

== Etymology ==
It is named after the Pandavas of the Mahabharata, who are said to have resided here for sometime during their agyatvaas.

== Transportation ==
Pandaul has a railway station where various passenger and local trains stop. Darbhanga Airport is at a distance of 24km from here.

== Education and Livelihood ==
There are many government schools and colleges. People in the area are mainly employed in agriculture, pisciculture and construction. There is also an industrial area here. Mango farming is also a major source of income here.

== History ==
Majority of its parts were established by Padmapati Kanth, his descendants the Kanths of Kamalpur were the Zamindars of this region.

== Geography ==
Pandaul is situated about 10 kilometres south of the district capital Madhubani, at an average elevation of 53 metres above the sea level. It has a total area of 1065.4 hectares.

== Pandaul ==
Pandu has a Humid Subtropical Climate (Cwa). The lowest average rainfall occurs in November, with around 4 mm of precipitation, while the highest rainfall occurs in July, with around 366 mm of precipitation.

Climate data for Gania
Month	Jan	Feb	Mar	Apr	May	Jun	Jul	Aug	Sep	Oct	Nov	Dec	Year
Mean daily maximum °C (°F)	22.4 (72.3)	26.3 (79.3)	32.2 (90.0)	36.0 (96.8)	35.3 (95.5)	33.5 (92.3)	31.5 (88.7)	31.5 (88.7)	30.9 (87.6)	29.9 (85.8)	27.8 (82.0)	24.1 (75.4)	30.1 (86.2)
Daily mean °C (°F)	16.4 (61.5)	19.9 (67.8)	25.3 (77.5)	29.5 (85.1)	29.8 (85.6)	29.3 (84.7)	28.2 (82.8)	28.1 (82.6)	27.4 (81.3)	25.4 (77.7)	22.0 (71.6)	18.1 (64.6)	25.0 (76.9)
Mean daily minimum °C (°F)	10.6 (51.1)	13.5 (56.3)	18.2 (64.8)	22.9 (73.2)	24.7 (76.5)	25.6 (78.1)	25.7 (78.3)	25.6 (78.1)	24.7 (76.5)	21.3 (70.3)	16.4 (61.5)	12.2 (54.0)	20.1 (68.2)
Average rainfall mm (inches)	12 (0.5)	15 (0.6)	16 (0.6)	27 (1.1)	85 (3.3)	214 (8.4)	366 (14.4)	320 (12.6)	254 (10.0)	67 (2.6)	4 (0.2)	6 (0.2)	1,386 (54.5)
Source: Climate-Data.org

== Demographics ==
In the 2011 Census of India, Pandaul had a population of 32,689 in 6,590 households. The working population made up 31.30% of the overall population. The average literacy rate was 50.61%, with 9,999 literate males and 6,545 literate females.
