= Baruar, Madhubani district =

Baruar is a village in Bhatchaura panchayat of Babubarhi block in Madhubani district, Bihar state, India. Its distance about 8 km from Babubarhi. The population is almost 9000 people of all castes. There is almost all the caste are leaving. Full name is Vishnu Baruar. This village is famous for its Lakshmi Naryan Tample which is historic and also for Ramnavmai mela which is celebrate on the occasion of Ramnavmi.
