= Basant Kushwaha =

Indian politician (died 2015)

Basant Kushwaha was an Indian politician who was elected as a member of the Bihar Legislative Assembly from the Harlakhi Assembly constituency, Madhubani. He was a leader of Rashtriya Lok Samata Party (RLSP). Kushwaha contested and won the assembly elections in 2015 as a candidate of the RLSP, but he died that year from a cardiac attack before taking the oath of office. In the by-polls conducted after one year, in 2016, his son, Sudhansu Shekhar won the constituency for the first time.
