= Benipatti =

Town in Bihar, India

Coordinates: 26°26′34″N 85°54′09″E

Benipatti बेनीपट्टी
- Town
- Benipatti
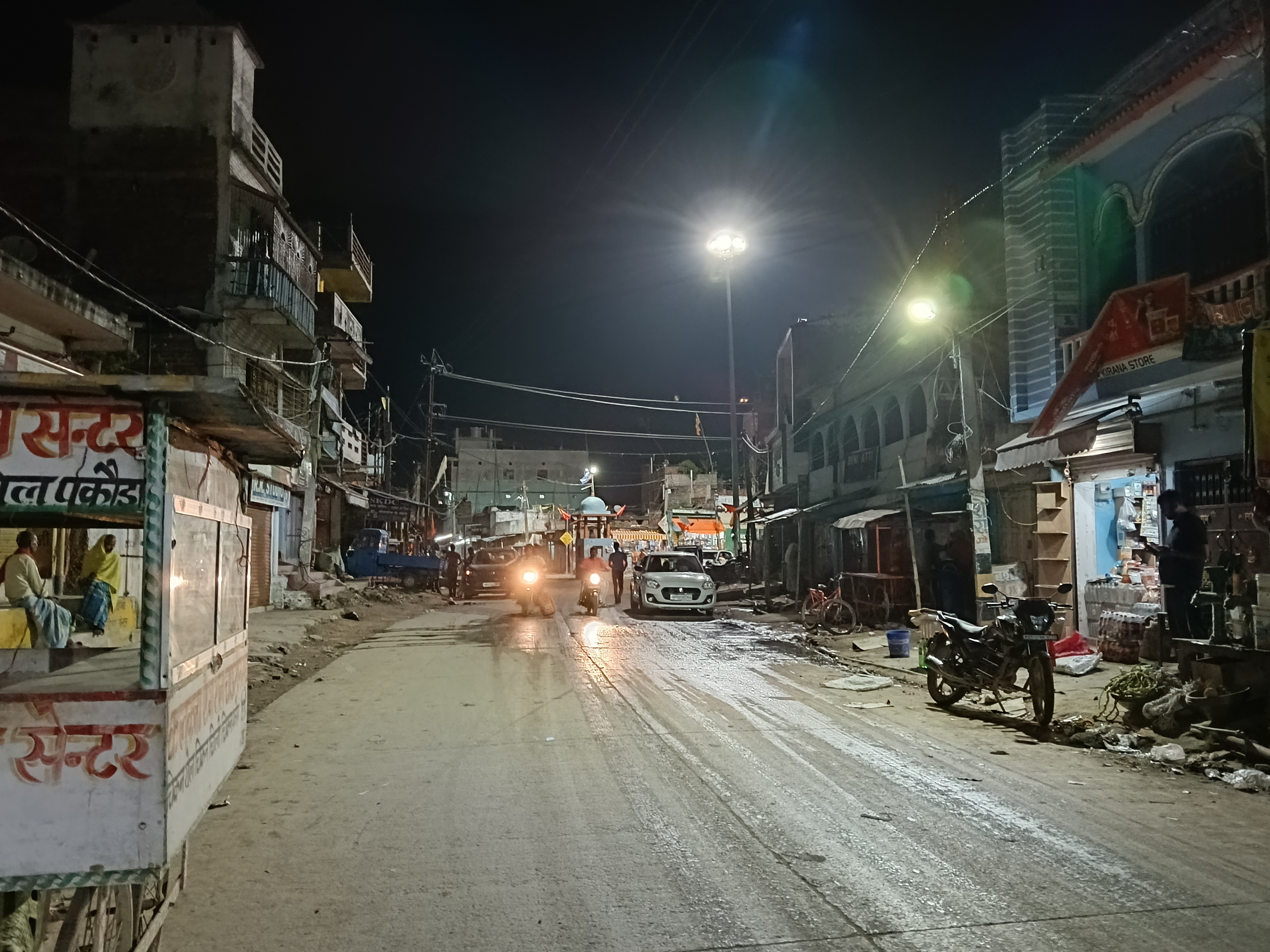
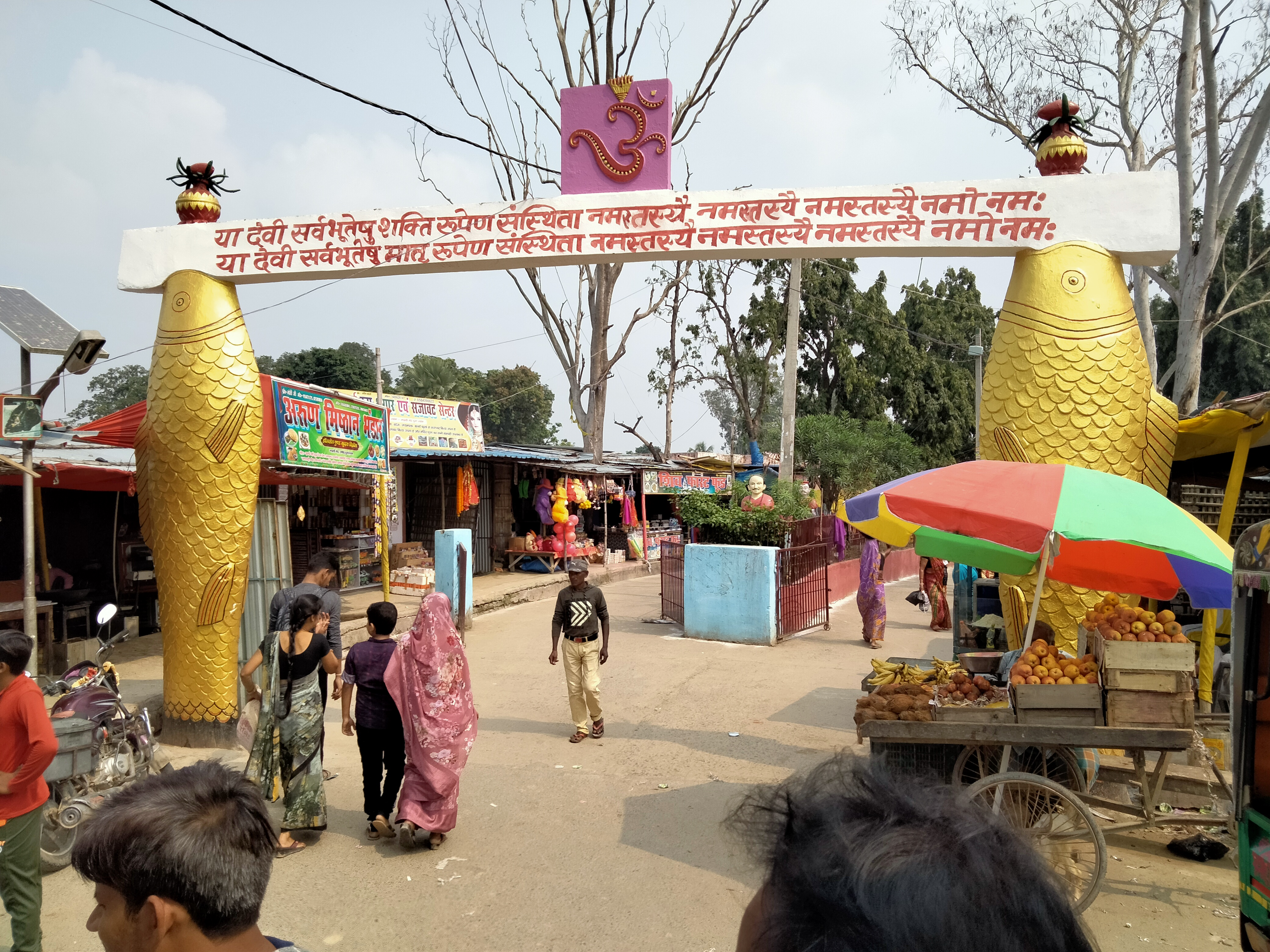
- Night view of Benipatti town Entrance corridor of Uchchaith Bhagwati Mandir
- Interactive map of Benipatti
- Country: India
- State: Bihar
- Region: Mithila
- Division: Darbhanga
- District: Madhubani
- Demonym: Maithils

Languages
  - Official: Mother tongue; Ancient: Hindi; Maithili; Sanskrit

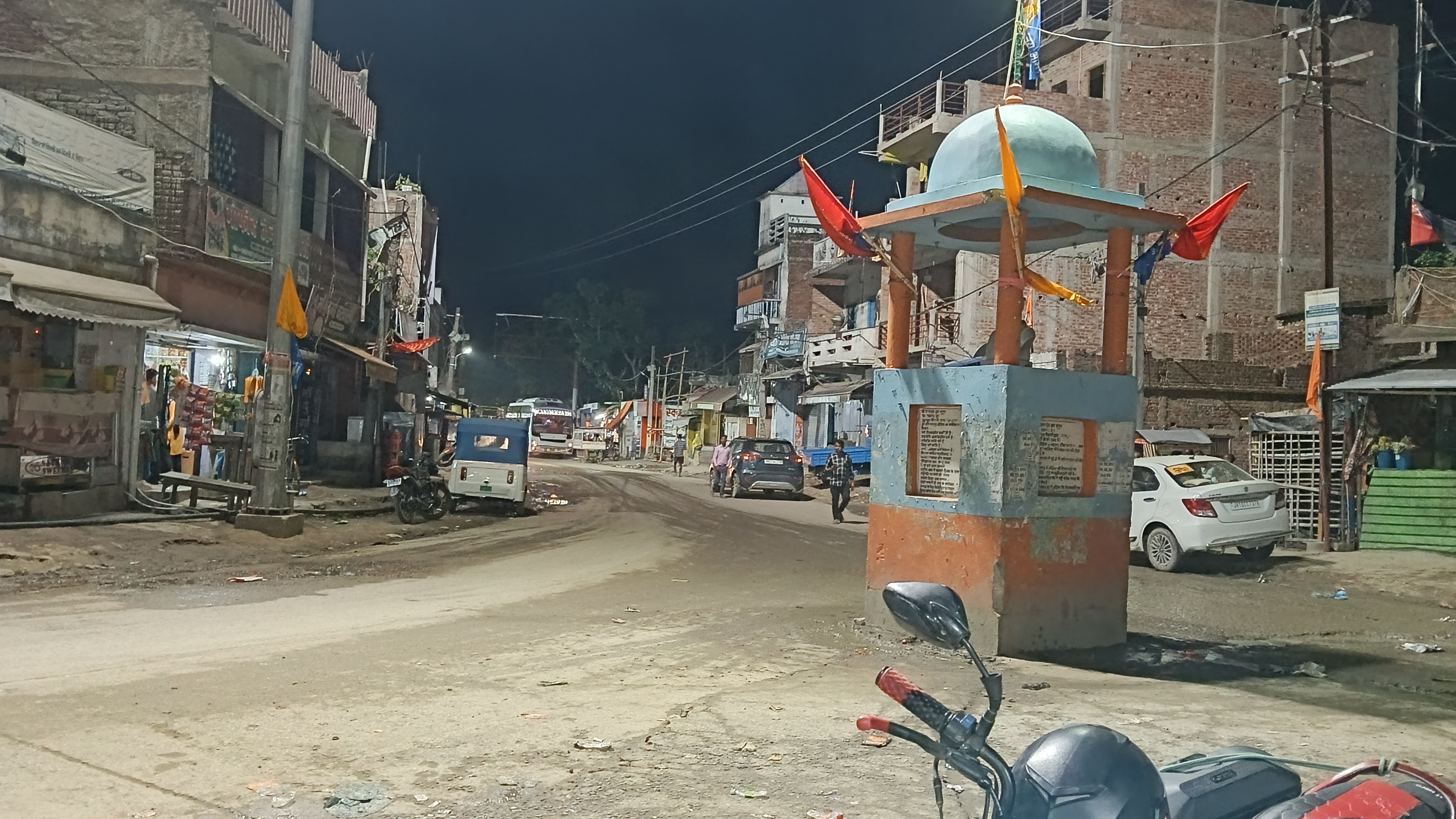
Night view at Lohiya Chowk in the town of Benipatti.

Benipatti is a town and headquarter of sub-division Benipatti in the Madhubani district of the Mithila region in Bihar, India. The native language of Benipatti is Maithili, while the official languages are Hindi and Urdu. In the early times, Benipatti was a centre of traditional learnings in the Mithila region.

In the modern era, professor Yugeshwar Jha was a prominent leader in the region of the Benipatti subdivision. In the town of Benipatti, there is a historical location Yugeshwar Jha Ashram named after him to remember his legacy in the region. He belonged to the village of Basuki Bihari near an Indo - Nepal border in the subdivision. He was a former state minister of the education department in the state of Bihar in India. Similarly, at the present times, the Maithili folk singer known as Maithili Thakur is a prominent young icon from the region of the Benipatti subdivision. She has recently been emerged as one of the youngest political leaders in the country.

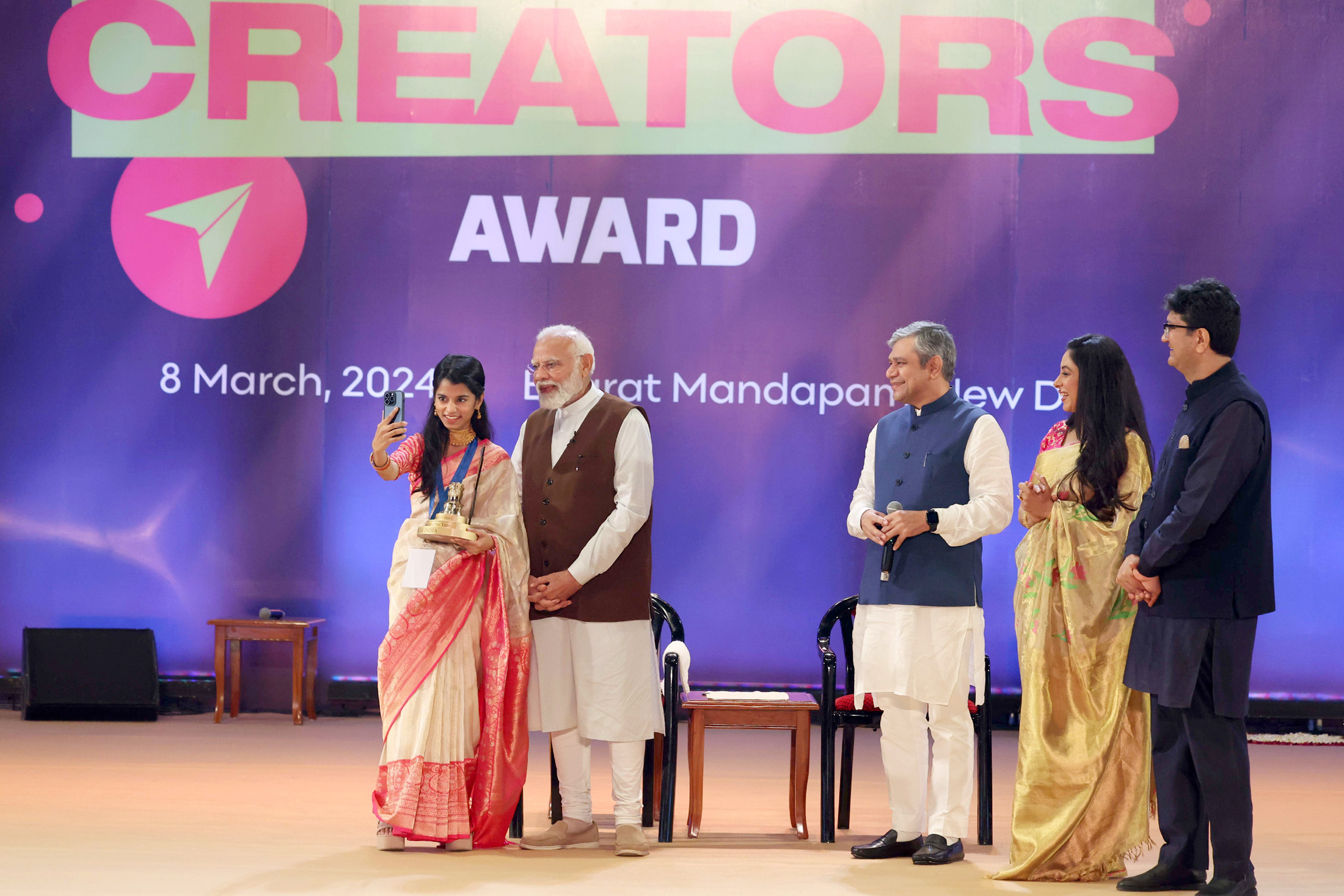
Maithili Thakur receiving Best Creator award (2024) from the Prime Minister Narendra Modi in New Delhi.

The town of Benipatti holds several government offices of the sub divisional administration. It holds the registry office of lands and revenues. In the fiscal year 2024-25, the registry office received revenue of Rs 28.78 crore from the purchase and sale of lands in the region of the subdivision.

== Culture ==
Benipatti has a versatile culture. Majority of people living here, speak Maithili. People traditionally wear dhoti, gamcha and saree. Madhubani painting is very famous here. Local cuisine includes thekua, litti, and other sweets. Durga Puja, Chhath Puja and Holi are popular festivals celebrated here.

The linguistic culture of the region is majorly influenced by the Maithili poems, songs and compositions of the Maithil poet Vidyapati. In the year 2024, a memorable museum known as Vidyapati Tower dedicated to the poet Vidyapati was constructed in the town near the Sansari Pokhair Chowk. It was inaugurated on 18 June 2025 by the local MLA Vinod Narayan Jha of the Benipatti Assembly Constituency in the region. Similarly, there is a chowk in the town named after the poet. A statue of the poet Vidyapati is installed at the chowk. The area where the chowk is established is known as Vidyapati Chowk.

At the north-west outskirts of the town, there is a legendary site known as Uchhaith Sthan also called as Durga Sthan dedicated to Goddess Bhagwati. There is an ancient temple of Goddess Kali at the site called as Uchhaith Bhagwati Mandir. According to legend, it is believed that the great Sanskrit scholar Kalidasa got his enlightenment in the temple by the Goddess Kali. The legendary site is also considered a Shaktipeetha in Hinduism.

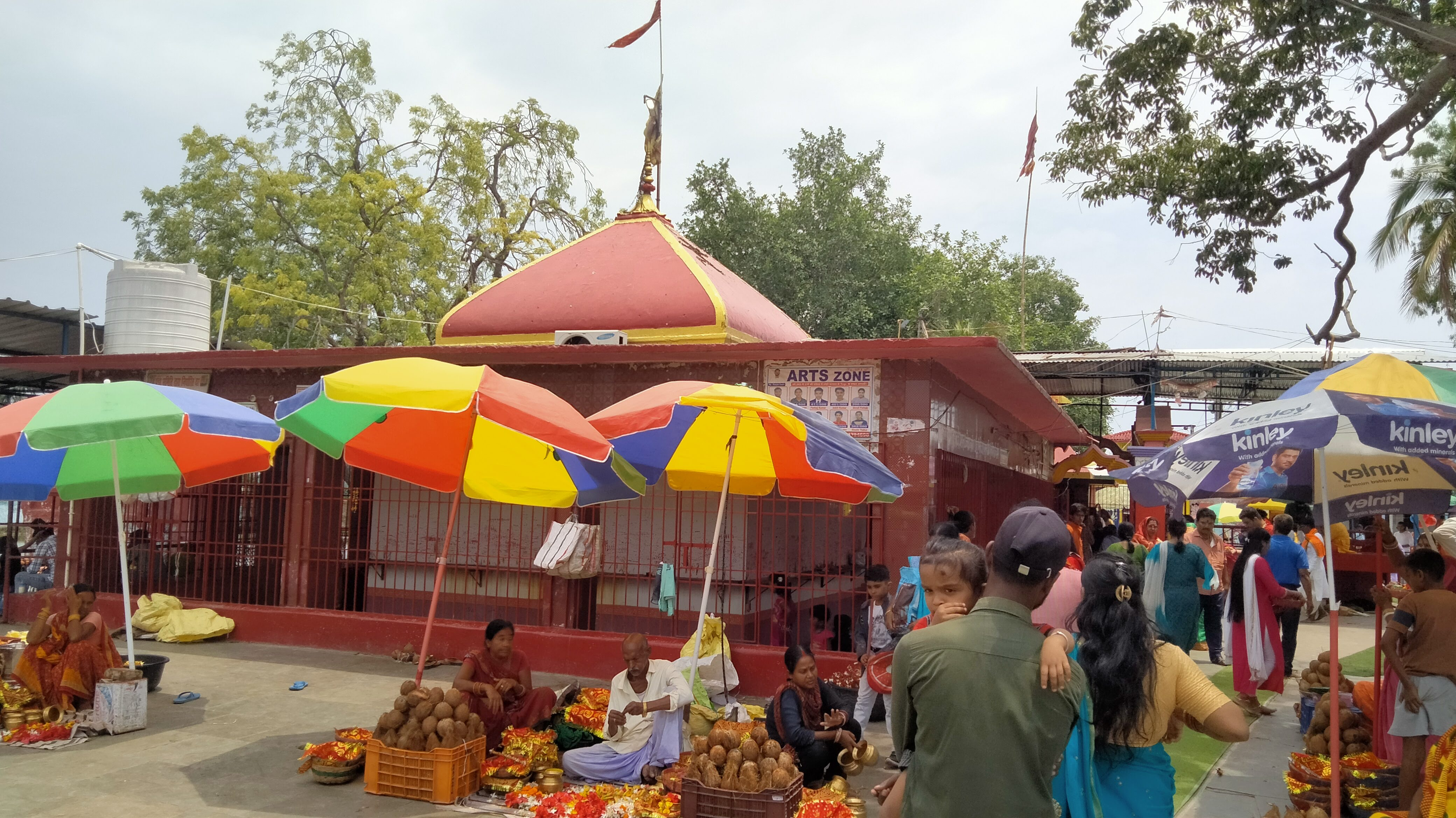
View of the Uchchaith Bhagwati Mandir

== Geography ==
Benipatti is situated near to the Himalayas and the Indo-Nepal frontier. Benipatti is close to the Bagmati river, and has many small rivers, canals and ponds, which make a diversified aquatic ecosystem. It is a flood prone region, receiving an annual rainfall of about 1270mm. The territory has vast cultivated fields, and moderately dense vegetation. Palm trees grow in large numbers in the region.

== Administration ==
The current administrative officers of Benipatti are:

- Sub-divisional magistrate — Sri Sarang Pani Pandey
- Deputy superintendent of police — Pushkar Kumar

== Economy ==
Benipatti is a hub of the bordering regions of Bihar. The main occupations are farming and business.

== Transportation ==
Benipatti is connected by road to the state capital Patna, and also to bordering towns of Nepal. Rail network is not directly available from the town, with the nearest railway station in Madhubani, 25 km away. The nearest airport is Darbhanga Airport approx 35 km away.

The town of Benipatti is being connected with the highway project of the Bharatmala in India. It will enhance the connectivity of the town across the country.

== Education ==
Government/Tagged Institutions

- Sri Liladhar High School, Benipatti
- +2 Project Girls High School, Benipatti
- Dr N. C. College, Benipatti
- K.V. Science College, Ucchaith Benipatti
- S. C. Mahila College, Benipatti

Private Institutions

- Madona English School
- Knowledge Development Kindergarten Academy
- Momentum Classes, Benipatti by Himanshu sir
- Nand niketan Arer. Vidya bharti public school January,
- Star Mission School
- D P S Benipatti
- Mithilanchal Pride Public School
- Central Public School
- S. S. Gyan Bharti Public School
- Mithila Academy Mahamadpur
