= Dhanga, Bihar =

Coordinates: 24°42′N 78°34′E

Dhanga is a village located in Madhubani district, Bihar, India.

language:- Maithili

Country :- India

Pincode:- 847229

State :- Bihar

District :- Madhubani
