= Kaluahi =

Village in India

- Village / Block
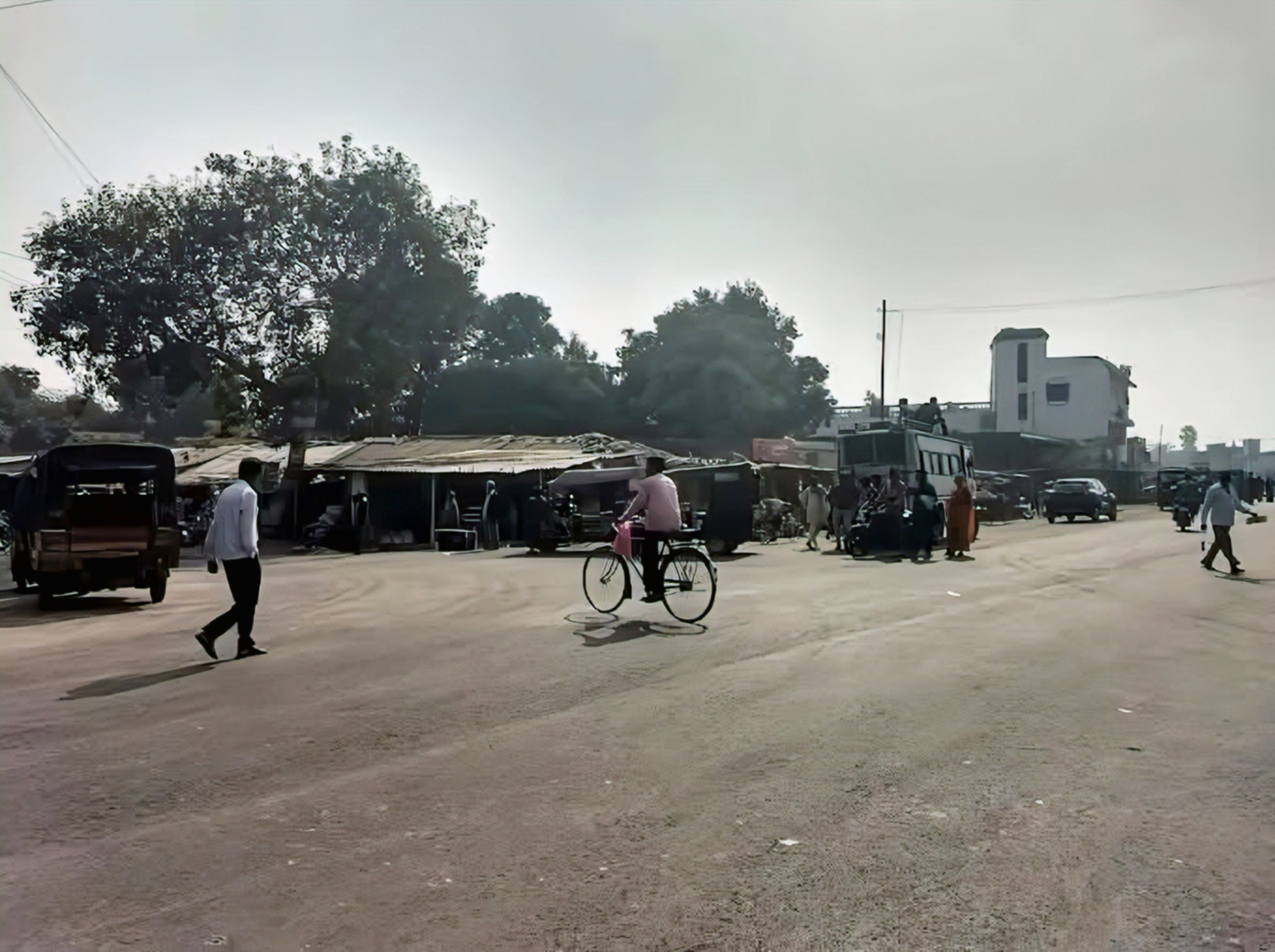
- ] Market area of Kaluahi town, Madhubani district, Bihar, India]

- Location in Bihar, India Kaluahi (India)
- Coordinates: 26.464°N 86.062°E
- Country: India
- State: Bihar
- District: Madhubani
- Block: Kaluahi

Population (2011)
  - Total: 841

Languages
  - Official: Hindi
  - Regional: Maithili

Demographics
  - Literacy: 44,79%
  - Sex ratio: 886
- Time zone: UTC+5:30 (IST)

Kaluahi is a village in Madhubani District, Bihar, India.
