= Jhanjharpur =

- Town
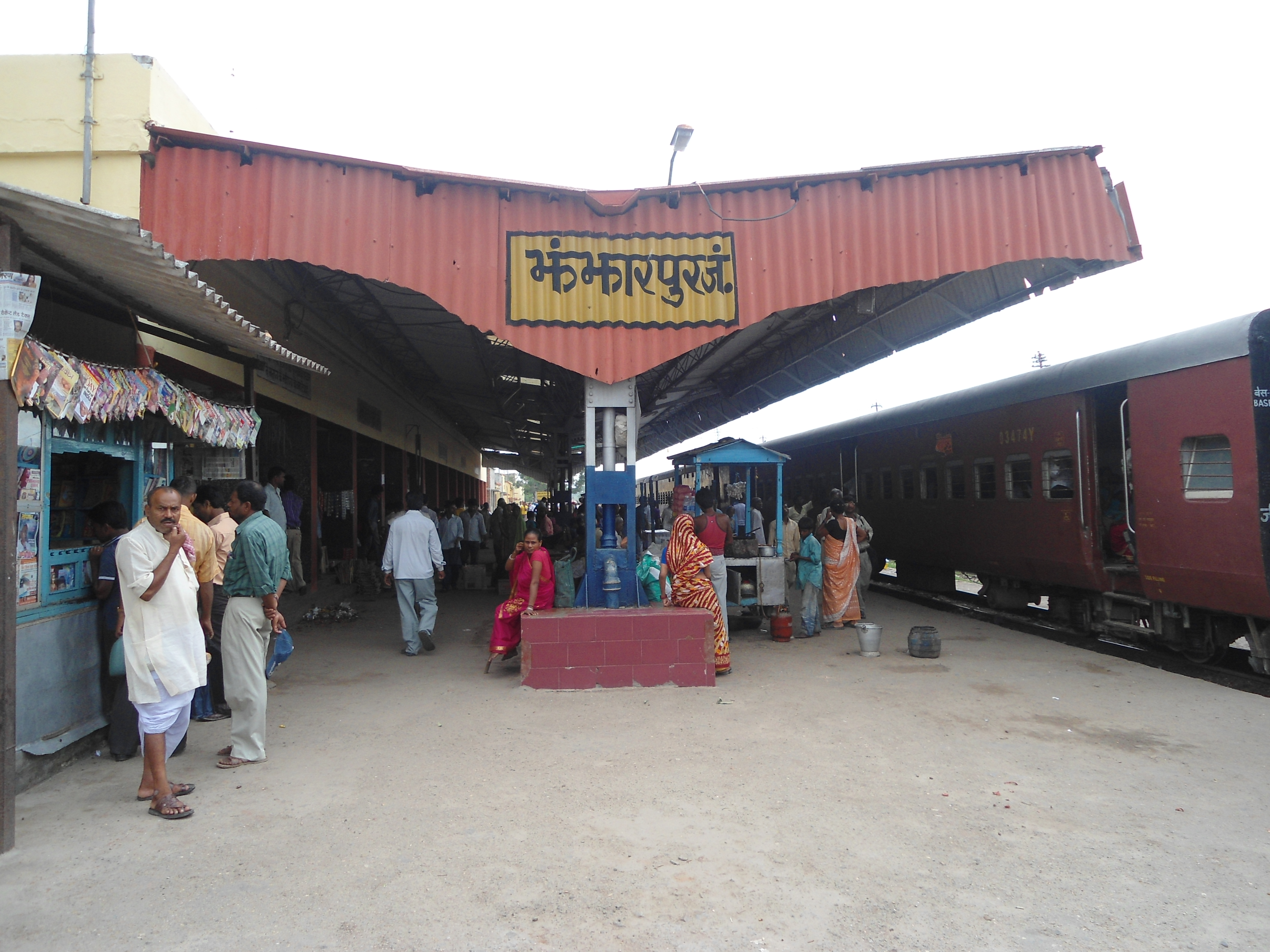
- Jhanjharpur Railway Station

- Location in Bihar, India
- Coordinates: 26.27°N 86.28°E
- Country: India
- State: Bihar
- District: Madhubani
- Elevation: 59 m (194 ft)

Population (2001)
  - Total: 24,102

Languages
  - Official: Maithili, Hindi
- Time zone: UTC+5:30 (IST)
- Lok Sabha constituency: Jhanjharpur
- Vidhan Sabha constituency: Jhanjharpur

Jhanjharpur is a town and a sub-division in the Madhubani district of the state of Bihar, India. It is well connected to the other cities of India with railways.

Jhanjharpur town is connected with, Kamla Balan bridge, a century-old 220 ft bridge built by the British in the early 1900s, being a rail-cum-road bridge (first rail-cum-road bridge in India) It facilitates the movement of dozen of trains and hundreds of vehicles every day to and from Jhanjharpur. Jhanjharpur is also connected to number of other places and destination via NH 57.

The nearest airport is Darbhanga Airport which is 48 km away from Jhanjharpur. People can also take their flights for the different cities of India from the Lok Nayak Jayprakash Narayan International Airport which is 191 km away from Jhanjharpur and present in the capital city of Bihar "Patna".

== Trade ==
Laukaha is a nearby town close to the border of Nepalese town of Thadi. Laukaha in India and Thadi in Nepal are a part of one of the agreed route for Mutual Trade between India and Nepal. Nepal Government of Nepal has set up a dedicated customs office in the town. and Government of India has set up a Land Customs Station with a Superintendent level officer.
