= Sita Devi (painter) =

Indian artist

- Born: 1914 near Saharsa, Bihar, British Raj (present-day India)
- Died: 2005 (aged 90–91); Jitwarpur, Madhubani district, Bihar, India
- Occupations: Painter, activist
- Movement: Madhubani art
- Awards: Padma Shri (1981)

Sita Devi (1914–2005) was an Indian artist, specializing in painting in the Madhubani tradition. She is one of the most well-known Madhubani artists from India, and was one of the first to receive national recognition for the art form, receiving a number of awards for her work including the Padma Shri (one of India's highest civilian honors) in 1981, as well as the Bihar Ratna Samman in 1984. She was influential in activism for local development in her village of Jitwarpur, in the state of Bihar, and taught Madhubani art to local residents, especially women, during her career in an effort to encourage financial stability. Her paintings have been praised for their individual style, particularly their use of color, have been widely exhibited, and are archived in India as well as in museums in France, the United States, the United Kingdom, and Japan.

== Biography ==
Sita Devi was born in a village near Saharsa in the state of Bihar in 1914, and moved to the village of Jitwarpur after her marriage. She belonged to a Mahapatra Brahmin caste family. She was illiterate, but learned to paint as child by using leftover paint from local potters, and painting on the walls of her home in the local traditional Madhubani style. She died in 2005 in Madhubani.

== Career ==
=== Art ===
Sita Devi learned to paint in the traditional Madhubani folk art style, and was one of the first artists who transitioned from the cultural practice of painting murals on walls, to working on paper, enabling her to sell Madhubani paintings. This was done at the encouragement of government officials, who, instructed by Prime Minister Indira Gandhi, encouraged local residents in Bihar to sell their paintings to counteract the financial impact of a state-wide drought. She was a forerunner in bringing Madhubani art, originating in her state of Bihar, to national attention in India. In 1969, the Bihar government honored her with a state award for her contribution to arts and she went on to win several other awards, including one of India's highest civilian honors, the Padma Shri.

In the 1960s and 70s, Sita Devi, along with fellow artists Ganga Devi and Baua Devi, were some of the most notable forerunners and innovators in the Madhubani art style in India. Notably she popularised the bharni (filled) form of Madhubani art, employing color and shading applied over line art. Her imagery drew from traditional Mithila / Madhubani motifs, including figures from mythology and the natural world, but later incorporated scenes from places that she had traveled to, including the World Trade Center, Arlington National Cemetery, and skylines from New York City. in 1981, at the invitation of Japanese curator, Tokio Hasegawa, she was one of several Madhubani artists who visited Japan to paint and help establish the Mithila Museum in Tokamachi, and incorporated Japanese landscapes into her art during this visit.

She was an artist-in-residence at India's National Handicrafts and Handloom Museum, Delhi, where her work was popular in political circles, and particularly amongst former prime ministers such as Indira Gandhi and Lal Bahadur Shastri. In 1978, she was commissioned to create a series of murals at the Akbar Hotel in New Delhi, a project on which she spent over a year.

During her lifetime, her work was exhibited widely in India and internationally, and is part of the permanent collections at the Victoria & Albert Museum in London, the Los Angeles County Museum of Art, the Philadelphia Museum of Art, the Musée du Quai Branly in Paris, and the Mithila Museum in Japan. It continues to be in commercial demand in public and private collections.

=== Activism ===
Sita Devi was active in local politics in Bihar, chiefly in the fields of local infrastructure development and art education. Utilizing the public attention she had gained as an artist, she agitated for improvements to her village of Jitwarpur, such as the construction of roads, access to electricity, and the construction of schools. In addition, she taught Madhubani art to local residents, especially young women, and lobbied for government grants to teach painting.

== Honors and awards ==
- 1969: Bihar State Government Award for Madhubani art
- 1976: "Master Craftsman" Award from the President of India, Fakhruddin Ali Ahmed
- 1981: Padma Shri, Government of India, for art
- 1984: Bihar Ratna Samman
