= 108 metres Mithila's Ramayana painting =

108 metres Mithila painting

- The 108 metres Mithila Painting
- Year: 2026
- Completion date: 14 August 2026
- Subject: 51 episodes from the Ramcharitmanas based Ramayana of Tulsi Das
- Dimensions: 100 cm × 10800 cm (39 in × 4,300 in)
- Condition: Inaugurated on 15 August 2026
- Location: Mithila Chitrakala Sansthan, Madhubani; 26.3888393°N 86.0410357°E
- Owner: Mithila Chitrakala Sansthan

The 108 metres Mithila's Ramayana painting or simply 108 metres Mithila painting refers to the world longest Ramayana painting created in August 2026 at the Mithila Chitrakala Sansthan at the Saurath village near the city of Madhubani in the Mithila region of Bihar in India. This historic painting of Ramayana has been included in the World Record of the World Records Union. It is recorded as "The world's longest Ramayana-themed Mithila (Madhubani) painting". It was created on the special canvas paper by the 160 artists of the Mithila Chitrakala Sansthan. The special canvas paper was brought from the city of Indore in Madhya Pradesh. The width of the painting is 1 metre. In the grand painting, 51 key episodes from the Ramcharitmanas have been depicted.

== World record description ==
The complete painting was inaugurated on the occasion of the 80th Independence Day of India, at the premises of the Mithila Chitrakala Sansthan in Saurath village. On Independence Day, 15 August 2026, the team of World Records Union officially approved this achievement after thoroughly inspecting the entire painting. The World Records Union representative Christopher handed over the provisional certificate to the Mithila Chitrakala Sansthan in a ceremony organised at the premises. On 8 September 2026, the World Records Union has officially published the world record as the "Longest Madhubani painting".

The painting is permanently displayed in the main gallery of the Mithila Chitrakala Sansthan.

== Painting description ==
According to the director of the Mithila Chitrakala Sansthan, Chandrashekhar Prasad Singh, the artwork includes 51 episodes from the epic Ramayana based on the Ramcharitmanas. It begins with Lord Rama’s childhood life, and the major episodes included on the painting are associated with the legendary events such as the Dhanush Yajna, Sita-Ram Swayamvar and, Kagbhusundi Prasanga, exile, etc. For creating 51 episodes, different teams of artists for each theme, were formed. For each theme, around three artists were involved in the creation of the grand art work. The artwork included traditional Madhubani paintings as well as verses and couplets from the Ramcharitmanas. The inclusion of paintings, verses, and couplets made the art a unique confluence of art, literature, spirituality, and the region's folk cultures.

== History ==
The entire large painting was created over four days. The creation of the painting started on 10 August 2026 under the supervision of the four Padma Shri awardees, Shanti Devi, Dulari Devi, Shivan Paswan, and Bauaa Devi. Apart from the Padma Shri awardee, the National Award winners Dr. Rani Jha, Pratik Prabhakar, and Sanjay Jaiswal also guided the artists during the creation of the artwork. The painting was completed on 14 August 2026, and on the occasion of the 80th Independence Day, a large ceremony was organized at the premises of the Mithila Chitrakala Sansthan in Madhubani with the help of the Madhubani District Administration. The Rajya Sabha MP Sanjay Kumar Jha and the District magistrate Anand Sharma were the two major dignitaries of the ceremony.

The painting of the Kagbhusundi Prasanga (episode) was completed by the team of the Maithil painter Purnima Jha from Thalwara village in Darbhanga. The Kagbhushundi Prasanga is a famous episode in the epic Ramayana. The episode is associated with the devotion of Kagbhushundi to Lord Rama in the Ramayana. The episode is depicted in the traditional style of the Madhubani art in the painting.

The young Maithil artist Khushboo Kumari, also known as Khushbu Chaudhary, from the Jiraul village in the Harlakhi block of the Benipatti subdivision, was also the part of the artists involved in the Mithila painting.

After the creation of the grand painting, the Art, culture and youth affairs minister Pramod Kumar of the Bihar Government has launched a government initiative called Mukhyamantri Guru-Shishya Parampara Yojana on 2 September 2026, to preserve the endangered art forms of the Mithila paintings.
