= Karpoori Devi =

Indian folk artist (1929–2019)

- Born: 1929; Ranti, Madhubani, Bihar, India
- Died: 30 July 2019 (aged 89–90)
- Occupation: Folk artist
- Known for: Madhubani art, Sujni embroidery
- Awards: National Award for Sujni Art (1986); Bihar State Art Award (1980); Best Craftsman Award (1983)

Karpoori Devi (1929–30 July 2019) was an Indian folk artist, known for painting in the Madhubani art tradition and creating textile art in the Sujni tradition. who achieved both critical and commercial success by selling Madhubani art. Her work is archived in collections in India, as well as in Japan, Australia, and the United States.

== Career ==
Devi was taught Madhubani art techniques by her mother, and spent her early childhood painting on floors and walls made with dried cow dung. Her formal education was limited to early schooling.

Devi belonged to an early generation of Madhubani (sometimes known as Mithila) artists who gained public recognition for their work and style of art. Lalit Narayan Mishra, a Minister in the government led by former Prime Minister Indira Gandhi, advocated for the preservation of the Madhubani art tradition, drawing on his personal roots in the region, and Indira Gandhi herself was known to appreciate Devi's art herself. At the encouragement of Mishra, Gandhi established a branch of the All India' Crafts Council in the Madhubani region in Bihar. The Crafts Council encouraged artists like Devi to move their work from floors and walls, onto handmade paper, which enabled them to sell these paintings. Devi encountered social resistance to her work in the early years, particularly in relation to social taboos concerning women in the public sphere. In an interview, Devi stated she initially painted in secret for two years, because of disapproval from her husband's family regarding her art.

In addition to the Madhubani style, Devi was also skilled in the techniques of Sujni art, a lesser-known folk style in which traditional motifs and patterns are embroidered on cloth by hand. Her work in Madhubani art was a mix of the 'kachni' (line drawing) and 'bharni' (coloured styles). Although the use of these styles was traditionally confined to members of a particular caste, Devi's work transcended social boundaries by embracing both.

Devi's work was repeatedly exhibited in Japan, where the establishment of a Mithila Art Museum allowed her to share her work. She visited Japan nine times over the course of her career, beginning in 1987, and worked at the Museum to create art, and teach techniques, along with fellow Madhubani artist, Mahasundari Devi. Her works have also been exhibited in the United States of America, the United Kingdom, and France and is collected there in museums and private collections. Her work was featured in an exhibition titled 'Painting is my Everything', at the Asian Art Museum in San Francisco, as part of an exhibit on Madhubani art. Sujni-style embroidered panels made by Devi are a part of the collections of the National Gallery of Victoria in Australia.

Devi won multiple awards from the state government of Bihar and the union government of India during the course of her career, including the National Award for Sujni art in 1986 by the Ministry of Textiles, Union Government; a Bihar state art award for her work in Madhubani art in 1980, and a state government award for 'Best Craftsman' in 1983.

Devi maintained a close professional and collaborative relationship with fellow Madhubani artist, Mahasundari Devi, who was also her sister-in-law. In addition to teaching her daughter the traditional art techniques of Madhubani and Sujani art, Devi mentored and taught Dulari Devi, a Padma Shri award-winning Madhubani artist.

== Personal life ==
Karpoori Devi was born and lived in the village of Ranti, in the Madhubani district of the state of Bihar. Her daughter, Moti Karn, is also a Madhubani artist. Her husband, Krishkant Das, also taught art in Ranti, Bihar. She died in 2019 after a prolonged illness.
