= Kameshwar Choupal =

Indian politician (1956–2025)

Member of Bihar Legislative Council
- In office 7 May 2002 – 6 May 2014
- Constituency: elected by Legislative Assembly members

Personal details
- Born: 24 April 1956; Kamrail, Supaul district, Bihar, India
- Died: 7 February 2025 (aged 68); Delhi, India
- Political party: Bharatiya Janata Party
- Children: 3
- Education: M. A. (Economics)
- Alma mater: Jagdish Nandan College, Lalit Narayan Mithila University

Kameshwar Choupal (24 April 1956 – 7 February 2025) was an Indian politician who was a member of the Bihar Legislative Council. He was elected to Bihar Council in 2002. He is well known for laying the first brick of the Ram Mandir in Ayodhya on 9 November 1989. He received the status of first Kar Sevak by the organisation Rashtriya Swayamsevak Sangh.

Choupal contested the 2014 Lok Sabha elections from Supaul, Bihar on the Bharatiya Janata Party ticket. He died in Delhi on 7 February 2025, at the age of 68.

== Early life ==
Kameshwar Choupal was born on 24 April 1956 at Kamarail in the Supaul district of the Mithila region in Bihar, into a Dalit family. He graduated from the J N College in Madhubani. Later he did his MA (Economics) from the Lalit Narayan Mithila University, Darbhanga in 1958.

== Later life ==
In the later life, he joined as a member of Vishwa Hindu Parishad. Later he became co-organization minister of the organisation for the territory of Bihar. In 1991, he contested an election against Ram Vilas Paswan. But he was not able to defeat him and lost the election. In 1995, he contested in the Bihar Assembly election from the Bakhari assembly constituency of the Begusarai district but again lost the election.
