= July 15, 1972 =

Live album by Taj Mahal Travellers
- Released: 1972
- Recorded: July 15, 1972
- Genres: Free Improvisation, Drone
- Length: 49:56
- Label: CBS Japan SOCM-95
- Producer: Go Hamada

July 15, 1972 is the second album by Taj Mahal Travellers. It was recorded live at the Sogetsu Hall in Tokyo, Japan on July 15, 1972.

== Track listing ==
No.	Title	Length
1.	"Between 6:20 and 6:46 PM"	25:36
2.	"Between 7:03 and 7:15 PM"	11:15
3.	"Between 7:50 and 8:05 PM"	13:05

== Personnel ==
- Takehisa Kosugi - electronic violin, vocals and radio oscillators
- Ryo Koike - electronic contrabass, santur, sheet iron, and harmonica
- Yukio Tsuchiya - vibraphone,
- Michihiro Kimura - electronic guitar & percussion
- Seiji Nagai - electronic trumpet, harmonica, castanets
- Tokio Hasegawa - vocals
- Hideo Yamashita - cover illustration
