= Amrish =

Amrish is a masculine given name. Notable people with the name include:

- Amrish Singh Gautam (born 1956), Indian politician
- Amrish Ranjan Pandey (born 1988), Indian youth leader
- Amrish Patel (born 1952), Indian politician
- Amrish Puri (1932–2005), Indian actor
