= Jagdamba Devi =

Indian artist (1901–1984)

- Born: 25 February 1901; Bhajparaul, Darbhanga, Bengal Presidency, British India
- Died: 8 July 1984 (aged 83); Jitwarpur, Madhubani, Bihar
- Known for: Mithila Painting
- Awards: Padma Shri (1975)

Jagdamba Devi (25 February 1901 – 8 July 1984) was an Indian artist and pioneer Madhubani painter.. She played a crucial role in transforming Mithila painting, traditionally painted on mud walls, into an internationally recognized art form on paper and canvas. She is the first Madhubani painter to receive national recognition for this art form, receiving one of India's highest civilian honours, Padma Shri award, in 1975 from the Government of India.

== Early and personal life ==
Jagdamba Devi was born on 25 February 1901 in Bhajparaul, Darbhanga, Bengal Presidency, British India, into a Maithil Karna Kayastha family.Her father was died when she was 5 and after a year her mother also passed away. During the early 20th century, school education was limited for girls and their skills and potential were measured by folk arts, including singing and cooking. She didn't go to school and learn the Madhubani art from village kids. She married Bal Krishna Das, a resident of Jitwarpur, at the age of 9. Her married life was awful as her husband died with in a month.

== Career ==
She began her artistic career by creating Mithila art paintings on clay pots and engaging in sikki crafts. Her major source of income during those days was paintings on mud walls during Maithil Vivah. The availability of chemical colours was limited during British raj in Jitbarpur, so she made different natural colours out of the edible gum, goat milk, lampblack, bark of sacred fig, desi gulab and har singaar flower.

Bihar was hit by a drought during the 1966-67 season, resulting in widespread food shortage. Then AIHB head and close friend of the then Indian Prime Minister Indira Gandhi, Pupul Jayakar commissioned Bombay-based artist Bhaskar Kulkarni to visit Madhubani district and support the local traditional women artists by supplying Basaha Kagaj. This is an experimental scheme, and the motif is to encourage them to paint Madhubani art on portable medium so they can earn money to run their livelihoods.During the visit, Kulkarni reached Jitwarpur and was captivated by the paintings of Jagdamba Devi, depicting Ramayana and Mahabharata scenes, which she had painted on her cottage mud walls.

Kulkarni took her Mithila painting to Delhi for exhibition at the Central Cottage Industries Emporium, where it received praise from art lovers.

== Recognition ==
She received the National Award from the president of India, V.V. Giri, in 1970. On September 4, 1973, the Government of Bihar honored her with the Daksh Shilpi Samman for her remarkable contributions to the development of Madhubani painting. In 1975, she was the first artist in the Madhubani painting genre to receive the Padma Shri award from the Government of India.

== Death ==
Devi died on 8 July 1984 at the age of 83.
