= Taj Mahal Travellers =

Japanese experimental music band

- Origin: Japan
- Genres: Experimental
- Years active: 1969–?
- Past members: Takehisa Kosugi; Ryo Koike; Yukio Tsuchiya; Seiji Nagai; Mini-Korg; Michihiro Kimura; Tokio Hasegawa; Kinji Hayashi

The Taj Mahal Travellers (also given variously as Taj Mahal Travelers, Taj-Mahal Travellers, etc.) were a Japanese experimental music ensemble founded in 1969 by former Group Ongaku leader and Fluxus member Takehisa Kosugi. The rest of the group were several years younger than Kosugi, and were all inspired by the spirit of the day. They chose mainly to perform their music outdoors, often on beaches and hilltops, creating spontaneously improvised drones (compare with Dronology), often using standard musical instruments, albeit in unconventional ways (e.g., a bowed double bass placed flat on its back). The group's sound was heavily reliant on electronic processing, particularly delay effects.

== Personnel ==
- Takehisa Kosugi: electric violin, harmonica, voice etc.
- Ryo Koike: electric double bass, santur, voice, etc.
- Yukio Tsuchiya: tuba, percussion, etc.
- Seiji Nagai: trumpet, Mini-Korg synthesizer, tympani, etc.
- Michihiro Kimura: voice, percussion, mandolin, etc.
- Tokio Hasegawa: voice, percussion, etc.
- Kinji Hayashi: electronic technique

== Discography ==
- Live Stockholm July 1971
  - First issue (unauthorized): Double CD, Drone Syndicate DS-01/02, 2001
  - Second issue (authorized): Double CD, Super Fuji Discs FJSP-51/52, 2008
- July 15, 1972
  - album, CBS Japan SOCM-95, 1972
  - Re-issue: CD, Showboat SWAX-501, 2002
- Oz Days Live Compilation also featuring Les Rallizes Denudes and Acid Seven Group (Taj Mahal Travellers has one track only)
  - Double LP, with Les Rallizes Dénudés, 1973
- August 1974
  - Double LP, CBS Japan OP-7147-8-N, 1975
  - Re-issue: Double CD, P-Vine PCD-1463/4, 1998
