= Dulari Devi (artist) =

Indian folk Madhubani artist

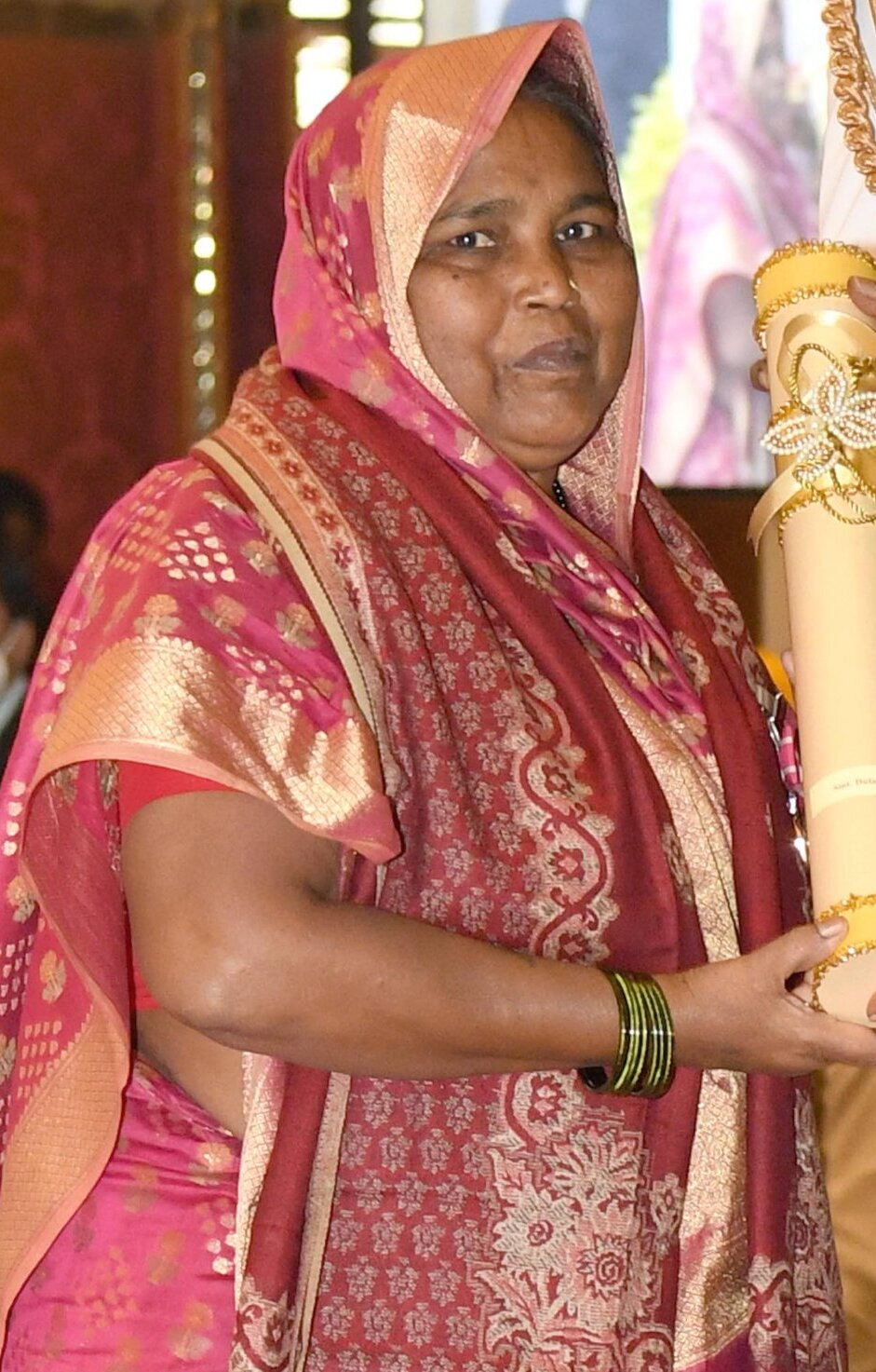
- Known for: Madhubani Art
- Style: Bharni, Kachnhi
- Awards: Padma Shri

Dulari Devi (born 1968) is an Indian artist and illustrator, working in the Mithila art tradition. In 2021, she was a recipient of the Padma Shri, a civilian honour granted by the Government of India, for her contributions to art.

== Life and education ==
Devi lives in the village of Ranti, in the State of Bihar, in India, and was born into the marginalised Dalit Mallaah caste. She was married at the age of thirteen, but returned to live with her family at the age of eighteen, after the death of her child. She did not receive any formal education, and learned to draw and illustrate in the Madhubani style while she was working as a domestic servant in the home of Madhubani artist Mahasundari Devi. Mahasundari Devi introduced her to another artist, Karpoori Devi, who also taught Dulari Devi Madhubani art and techniques.

== Career ==
Dulari's work follows the Madhubani art tradition (sometimes called Mithila art), a folk art school that developed in the Indian state of Bihar. She practices both, the ‘Kachnhi' (line sketching) ‘and ‘Bharni’ (colored) styles of Madhubani but has indicated a preference for the latter. Although the usage of these styles has traditionally been confined to membership in specific castes, critic Sunil Kumar has described her work as being able to move between traditional stylistic divisions and occupy both fields, praising her "immense skill." In addition, her choice of themes and description has been cited as an example of the increasing expression of empowerment among women. Her work has also been described as "...combining community traditions with modern themes".

Cover of Following My Paint Brush

Her work has been featured as part of course material in the Maithili language at the Indira Gandhi National Open University. In 2005, her work was curated as part of an exhibition focusing on the use of traditional imagery in Madhubani art by Narendra Narayan Sinha. In 2010, Devi and several other folk artists recorded tribal folklore in their art, which was anthologized by publisher Tara Books in a volume of silk-screen prints, titled Sun and Moon. In 2018, her painting titled "Prime Minister Narendra Modi arriving at a village in a helicopter" was part of a curated exhibit of Madhubani art at the Asian Art Museum in San Francisco. The exhibition, titled 'Painting is My Everything', curated by Qamar Adamjee, was named after a quote taken from Devi's description of her own career as an artist. In addition to painting, Devi has completed a number of murals for the Central and state governments in India, and teaches Madhubani art techniques to children. She is an instructor at the Madhubani Art Institute, located in Madhubani, in Bihar.

In 2011, Devi published an illustrated autobiography titled Following My Paint Brush, which she co-wrote with writer and publisher Gita Wolf. Her recent paintings, documenting the impact of COVID-19 lockdowns in her community, have been acquired by Princeton University for their Graphic Arts Collection. Her work has also been featured at an exhibition called 'Tradition and Transformation: Mithila Art of India' at the William Benton Museum of Art following a donation of her art pieces from the Ethnic Art Foundation and Katherine Myers. Director Nataša Urban is in research to build a documentary starring her, called "Better to be a tree than a girl". It is a documentary about a group of young women painters from Bihar, India, who use the ancient Mithila painting style to fight discrimination and patriarchy.

== Awards ==
- 2021 - Padma Shri
- 2012 - State of Bihar Award for Excellence in Art
