= Amrish Ranjan Pandey =

National Media Incharge & Chief Spokesperson IYC
- In office 2017 – July 2020

National Secretary and In-Charge (West Bengal) IYC
- Incumbent
- Assumed office 2020

National Media Coordinator IYC
- In office 2015–2017

National Media Incharge & Spokesperson NSUI
- In office 2012–2015

Personal details
- Born: Amrish Ranjan Pandey (Age 30) Madhubani, Bihar
- Party: Indian National Congress
- Occupation: Politician and lawyer
- Known for: Politician and lawyer
- Website: amrishranjanpandey.in

Amrish Ranjan Pandey is a youth leader and is currently officiating as the National Secretary of the Indian Youth Congress. He was appointed the National Secretary of IYC in March 2020 and is currently the IYC In-charge for the State of West Bengal and was given the charge in July 2020, as West Bengal Assembly polls are also approaching. He is a practising lawyer in the Delhi-NCR region.

He started his political career with Congress Party's student Wing NSUI. He has been very active in both student and youth politics at IYC and NSUI.

== Early life ==
Amrish was born in Bihar on 25 October 1988, as son of Smt. Rajkumari Pandey and Shri Arun kumar Pandey. He traces his lineage to Shri Damodar Pande, who was the Mulkaji of Nepal from 1803 to 1804 and is also popularly known as the first Prime Minister of Nepal. Another significant face from Amrish's family is Rana Jang Pande, who was the third Mukhtiyar or Prime Minister of Nepal. After a political conspiracy, Amrish's forefathers shifted to Madhubani, Bihar and the family has been settled there since. Having completed his primary and secondary education from Watson High School, Madhubani, Amrish has strong ties with Madhubani.

== Education ==
In year 2008, Amrish completed his Bachelor's degree in Philosophy from Zakir Hussain College, University of Delhi, where he took part in student politics and joined the National Students Union of India. Thereafter, he completed his master's degree from University of Delhi. He also holds a Bachelor of Law degree from Campus Law Center Delhi University.

== Career ==
Amrish has been an active participant at various Konrad Adenauer School for Young Politicians Programme (KASYP) established by Konrad Adenauer Foundation. He was first granted a fellowship by the foundation in 2013. Since then Amrish has attended several KASYP workshops. He was also called on to attend the Legislative Fellow Program by U.S. Department of State in 2016, wherein, Amrish worked with the office of the Speaker, Columbus, Ohio. Thereafter, he also attended the Professional Fellows Congress (Office of Citizen Exchanges), Washington D.C.

=== Administrative roles ===
1. Founder and Director – The Democratic Mirror– A Unique talk show on Media and Politics.
2. President – Center For Public Initiatives (NGO)
3. Former Secretary – Gandhi Study Circle at Zakir hussain College
4. Associate Volunteer – Gandhi Smriti and Darsan Samiti New Delhi.
5. Amrish is also the host and Director for a weekly talk show titled "Unveiling Political Truths", where he hosts renowned political personalities, journalists, educationists, and academicians etc. The show has hosted several personalities so far including Punya Prasun Bajpai, Sandeep Dikshit, Vivek Tankha, Rajiv Tyagi and Jaiveer Shergill etc.
6. Amrish and his media team also launched a nationwide oratory competition named Young India Ke Bol.

=== Political career ===
Amrish first joined NSUI in 2005 while studying at Zakir Hussain College. He was made the National Media Coordinator of NSUI in 2011. Thereafter, he became the National Spokesperson of NSUI in 2013.

Looking at his impeccable credentials, Amrish was called on to become the National Media Coordinator of IYC in the year 2015 and holds the post since then. He was Appointed the National Spokesperson of IYC in 2016.

Amrish was made the National Secretary of IYC in March 2020.

Amrish has also been a member of the All India Congress Committee Vichar Vibhag since 2011 and has fulfilled various responsibilities during the assembly elections in UP, Uttarakhand, Punjab, Goa and Manipur.
