= Ram Krishna College =

Degree college in Bihar

- Established: 1940
- Founders: Baboo Ram Krishna Purbey
- Affiliations: Lalit Narayan Mithila University
- Vice-Chancellor: S.P. Singh
- Principal: A K Mandal
- Location: Madhubani, Bihar, India
- Website: rkclnmu.ac.in

Ram Krishna College is a constituent college of Lalit Narayan Mithila University, Darbhanga. It was established in 1940. The college is Re-Accredited by NAAC by Grade-B. At present, the college imparts both Graduate and Post Graduate education to student across all the three facilities i.e. Arts, Science and Commerce. This college has separate blocks for Arts, Science and Commerce blocks, Administrative blocks.

== History ==
Ram Krishna College was established by Baboo Ram Krishna Purbey in August 1940 as an undergraduate college in the city of Madhubani. The college started courses in Arts, Science and Commerce in 1941 after getting affiliation from Patna University. In 1975, Ram Krishna College became one of the constituent colleges of Lalit Narayan Mithila University.

Post Graduate studies commenced in the college in 1983.

== Campus ==
Ram Krishna College spans over 52 acres of land which has Wi-Fi connectivity. Facilities are available for both indoor and outdoor sports including lawn tennis court, volleyball court, basketball court, cricket ground, football ground, table tennis, carrom, chess and badminton. The campus also houses a shooting range, lecture theatre, AC conference room and college library.

== Administration ==
Ram Krishna College is a constituent colleges of Lalit Narayan Mithila University since 1975, before which it was affiliated to Patna University. Shambhu Kumar Yadav is the principal of the college since 1 December 2016. S.K. Singh is the vice-chancellor.

== Geography ==
It is situated in Madhubani City, sapta, State Highway 52, Madhubani Bihar.
