= Godawari Dutta =

Indian painter (1930–2024)

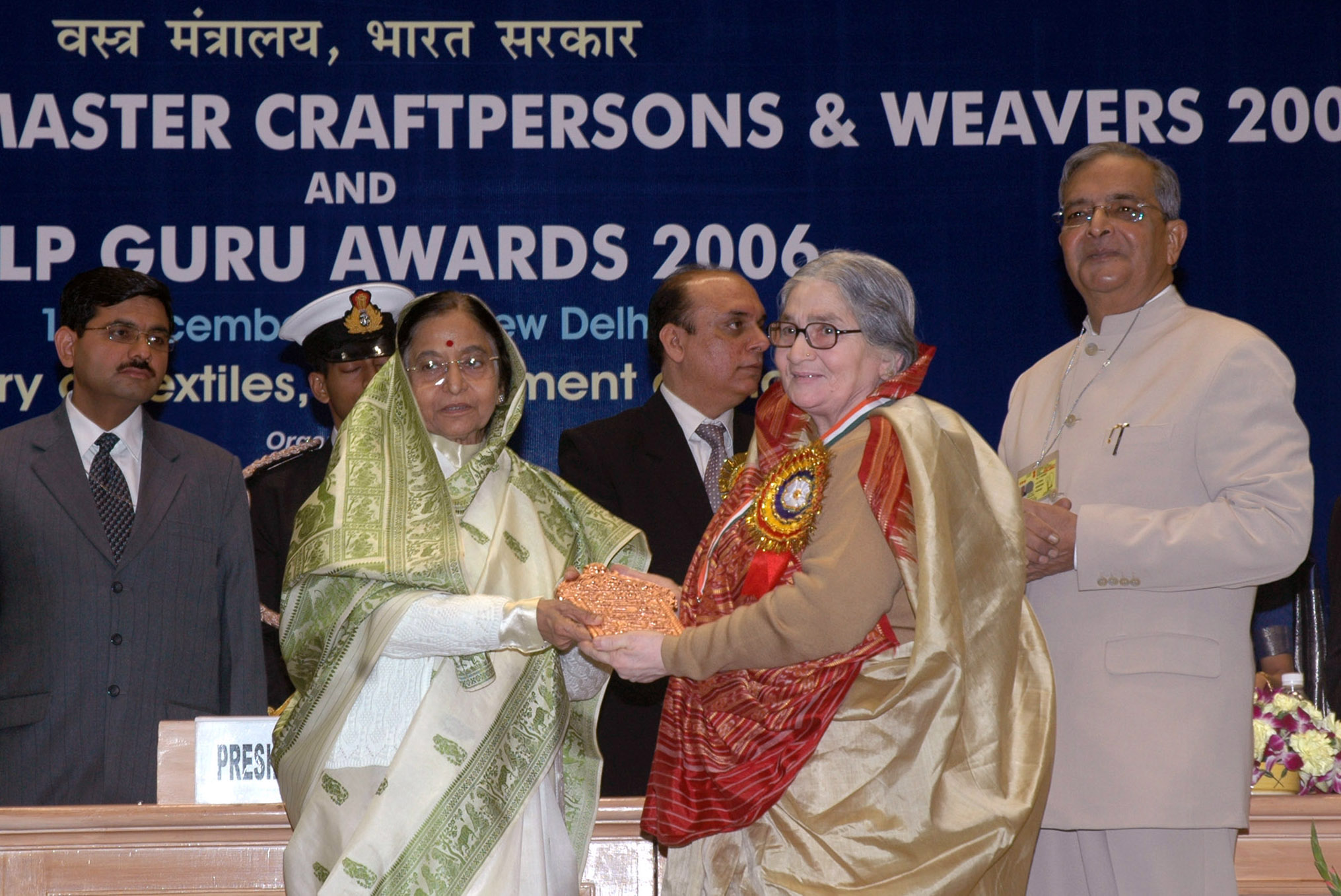
- Dutta (second from right) receiving the Shilp Guru award in 2008
- Born: 1930; Bahadurpur, Darbhanga district, Bihar and Orissa Province, British India
- Died: 14 August 2024 (aged 93); Ranti, Madhubani district, Bihar, India
- Known for: Painter
- Movement: Madhubani
- Awards: National Award; Shilp Guru; Padma Shri Award

Godawari Dutta (1930 – 14 August 2024) was an Indian painter, known for her Madhubani paintings. She was a recipient of India's fourth highest civilian award, the Padma Shri.

== Early life ==
Godawari Dutta was born in 1930 in Bahadurpur, Darbhanga district, Bihar, India. She was taught to paint by her mother, Subhadra Devi, herself an artist. At 10 years old, Dutta's father died and together with her three siblings she was brought up by her mother. Dutta married in 1947 and gave birth to a son whom she raised alone.

== Work and career ==
Dutta began painting at the age of six, first on walls and then on paper only in 1971. Dutta was well versed in the Kayastha style of Mithila paintings, which favours black and white contrasts, and she used bamboo sticks to paint. Reoccurring themes of her art are the portrayal of characters from Ramayana and Mahabharata, as well as events of daily life such as marriage or dance. Dutta trained both students and teachers under India's Centre for Cultural Resources and Training.

Dutta had frequently visited Germany and Japan, where she would stay at times for up to a year. A set of works that she created during that time were displayed in Mithila Museum in Tōkamachi, Japan, and Fukuoka Asian Art Museum.

In December 1983, Dutta founded Mithila Kala Viaks Samiti, an NGO that aims to fight poverty through education, and to promote the Madhubani style of painting. The organization is engaged in designing and implementing programmes for disadvantaged communities. Dutta also helped rural women to become financially independent, and was a proponent of girls’ education.

In 2019, Dutta was awarded the Padma Shri by President Ram Nath Kovind.

== Death ==
Dutta died on 14 August 2024, at the age of 93.

=== Awards ===
- National Award (1980)
- Shilp Guru (2006)
- Padma Shri Award (2019)
