= Madhubani art =

Indian/Nepalese style of painting

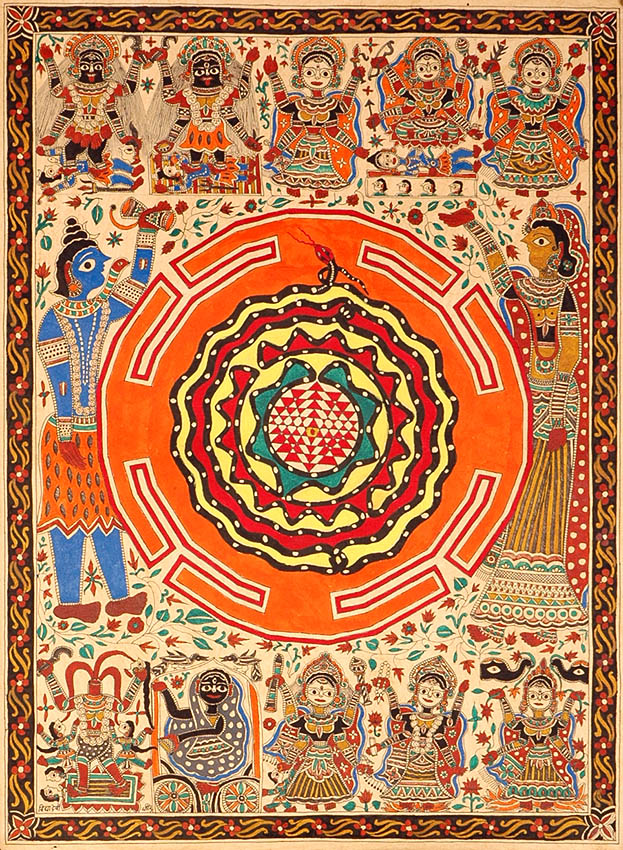
Mithila painting featuring God Shiva-Parvati and the Mahavidyas

Madhubani art (also known as Mithila art) is a style of painting practiced in the Mithila region of Nepal and Bihar. Janakpurdham, Jitwarpur, Ranti and Rasidpur are most notable cities associated with the tradition and evolution of Madhubani art. The art was traditionally practiced by female members. Artists create these paintings using a variety of mediums, including their own fingers, or twigs, brushes, nib-pens, and matchsticks. The paint is created using natural dyes and pigments such as Ochre and lampblack are used for reddish brown and black respectively. The paintings are characterized by their eye-catching geometrical patterns. There is ritual content for particular occasions, such as birth or marriage, and festivals, such as Holi, Surya Shasti, Kali Puja, Upanayana, and Durga Puja.

Traditionally, painting was one of the skills that was passed down from generation to generation in the families of the Mithila region, mainly by women. It is still practiced and kept alive in institutions spread across the Mithila region. Janakpurdham (ancient capital of Mithila), Kalakriti in Darbhanga, Vaidehi in Benipatti in Madhubani district and Gram Vikas Parishad in Ranti are some of the major centres of Madhubani painting which have kept this ancient art form alive.

== Origin and tradition ==
Madhubani paintings were first created at Mithila, the birthplace of the Hindu goddess Sita. When Sita and her husband King Rama were to be married, King Janak, father of Sita, asked for paintings to capture moments of the marriage. Madhubani painting (or Mithila painting) was traditionally created by the women of various communities in the Mithila region of the Nepal and Bihar. This painting as a form of wall art was practiced widely throughout the region; the more recent development of painting on paper and canvas mainly originated among the villages around Madhubani, and it is these latter developments that led to the term "Madhubani art" being used alongside "Mithila Painting."

The paintings were traditionally done on freshly plastered mud walls and floors of huts, but now they are also done on cloth, handmade paper and canvas. Madhubani art has been interpreted by scholars as a form of domestic ritual expression, closely tied to women's roles in preserving cultural memory and religious practices within the Mithila region. Madhubani paintings are made from the paste of powdered rice. Madhubani painting has remained confined to a compact geographical area and the skills have been passed on through centuries, the content and the style have largely remained the same. Thus, Madhubani painting has received GI (Geographical Indication) status. Madhubani paintings use two-dimensional imagery, and traditionally colors derived from nature. Traditional pigments used were: vermilion powder mixed with grounded mustard seeds for red, cow dung mixed with lampblack for greenish black, rice paste for white, Pevdi for lemon yellow, turmeric for yellow ochre, indigo for blue, palash flower for orange, bilva leaf for green, and red clay for red. Gum arabic or goat's milk formed the paint's binder, gum arabic was used for painting on paper and goat's milk was used mainly for wall paintings. Chemical powder pigment from Calcutta also became available in the 1940's. Artists continue to utilize traditional brushes, which consist of bamboo slivers, rags, and sticks.

== Symbols ==
Mithila paintings mostly depict people and their association with nature and scenes and deities from the ancient epics. Natural objects like the sun, the moon, and religious plants like tulsi are also widely painted, along with scenes from the royal court and social events like weddings. In these paintings generally, no space is left empty; the gaps are filled by paintings of flowers, animals, birds, and even geometric designs.

== Styles ==
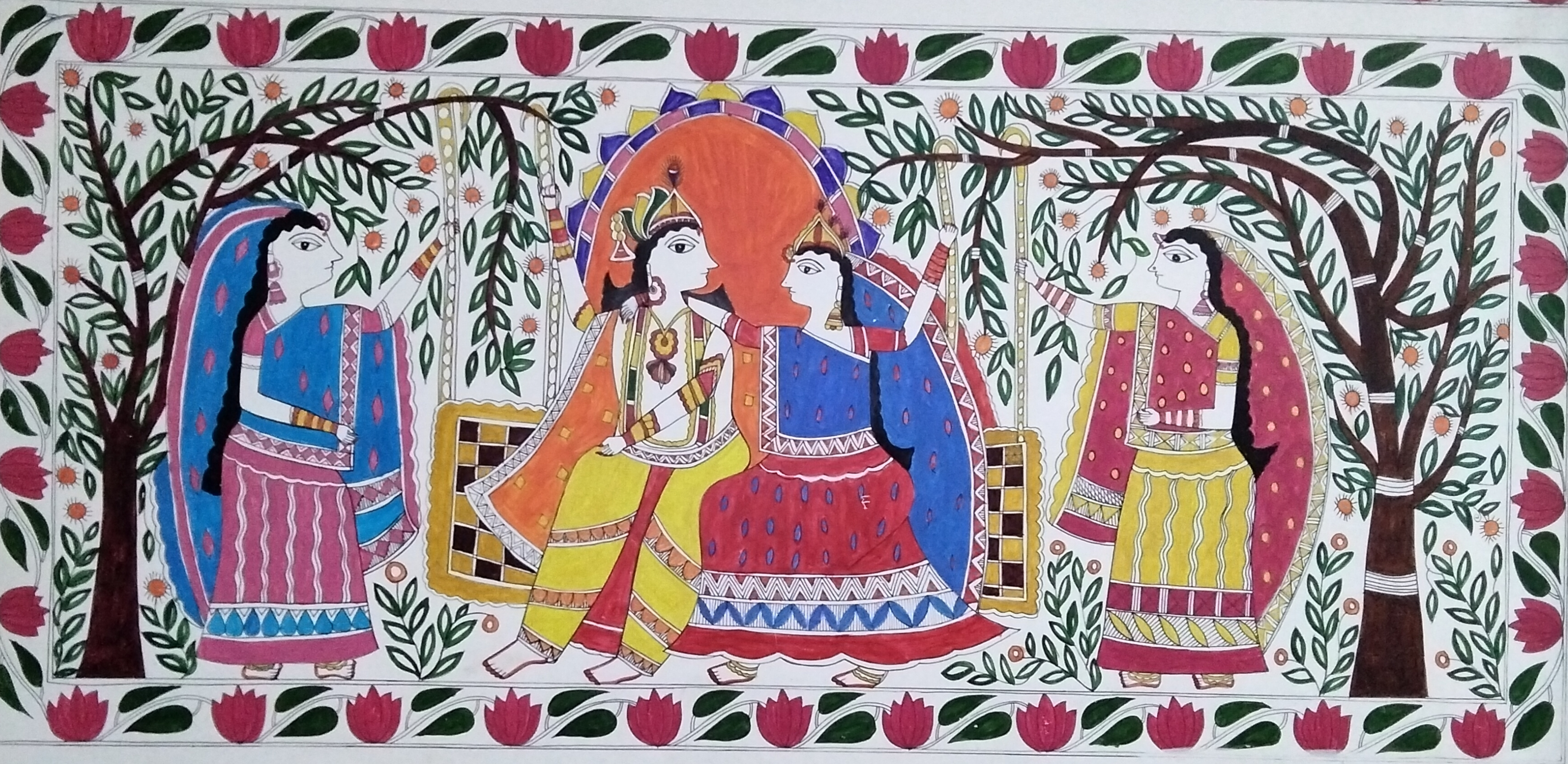
Mithila Painting mural at Patna Junction

Mithila art has five distinctive styles:

- Bharni
- Kachni
- Tantrik
- Godna
- Kohbar

In the 1960s, Bharni and Tantrik styles of Madhubani art were predominantly created by Brahmin women in India and Nepal, focusing on religious themes and depictions of gods and goddesses. Artists from other castes incorporated elements from their daily lives, local legends like the story of Raja Shailesh, and various symbols into their paintings. In contemporary times, Madhubani art has evolved into a global art form, transcending caste distinctions. Artists now freely work across all five styles, and Mithila art has gained international recognition. Khobar style, also known as puren, is traditionally painted on the wall of a Mithila wedding chamber, where a bride and groom spend their first night together. They most often depict circular motifs made up of feminized faces, and lines drawn in red and black ink. There are both Brahman and Kayastha versions of the Khobar style.

== Contributions ==
In the 1960s, Madhubani painters began to paint on canvas and paper in an effort to raise new sources of income for women in the impoverished Mithila region.

The Madhubani painting tradition played a key role in the conservation efforts in India in 2012, where there was frequent deforestation in the state of Bihar. Gram Vikas Parishad, an NGO, led the initiative to protect local trees in Bihar from being cut down for development and road expansion. Local painters were employed to paint trees with a mixture of lime, glue and synthetic enamel as a deterrent to deforestation. Paintings included gods and other religious and spiritual images such as those of Radha-Krishna, Rama-Sita, scenes from Ramayana and Mahabharata and other epics.

This art form has ties to the Self-Employed Women's Association (SEWA) of Madhubani. Madhubani artists have been featured in multiple museum collections and exhibitions, including a UNESCO Christmas card collection, and an exhibit from San Francisco's Asian Art Museum titled Painting is My Everything: Art From India's Mithila Region in 2018.

Notable artists include Karpoori Devi, Sita Devi, Jagdamba Devi, Ganga Devi, Baua Devi, Mahasundari Devi, and Gadavari Datta.

== Global recognition ==
Around 1982, a group of students from Japan came to visit in the Mithila region for a tourism trip. The students bought some pieces of the Madhubani art or paintings during their trip. After returning to their home country Japan, they approached to Tokio Hasegawa, with 80 Madhubani paintings seeking a suitable place for conducting exhibition. After that Tokio Hasegawa established an art museum known as Mithila Museum dedicated to the Madhubani paintings or art at his address Tokamachi in Japan.

== Awards ==
Madhubani painting received official recognition in 1969 when Sita Devi received the State award by the Government of Bihar. Mamta Devi from the village Jitwarpur also received the National Award. Jagdamba Devi from Bhajparaul, Madhubani was given Padma Shri in 1975 and the National Award to Sita Devi of Jitwarpur village near Madhubani. Jagdamba Devi's foster son Satya Narayan Lal Karn and his wife Moti Karn are also well-regarded Mithila artists, and they won the National Award jointly in 2003. Sita Devi received the Padma Shri in 1981. Sita Devi was also awarded by Bihar Ratna in 1984 and Shilp Guru in 2006.

In 1984 Ganga Devi was awarded by Padma Shri. Mahasundari Devi received the Padma Shri in 2011. Baua Devi, Yamuna Devi, Shanti Devi, Chano Devi, Bindeshwari Devi, Chandrakala Devi, Shashi kala Devi, Leela Devi, Godavari Dutta, Asha Jha Tira Devi and Bharti Dayal were also given the National award. Shree. Chandra Bhushan Lal Das (Rasidpur, Madhubani) received the National Award in 2003. Ambika Devi (Rasidpur, Madhubani) received the National Award in 2009. Smt. Manisha Jha (Raghopur Balat, Madhubani), Smt. Asha Jha (Kathalwadi Belabhor, Dharbhanga) and Shree. Devendra Kumar Jha (Jitwarpur, Madhubani) received the National award jointly in 2013. In 2020, Madhubani artist Dulari Devi won the Padma Shri for contributions to art.

== Gallery ==
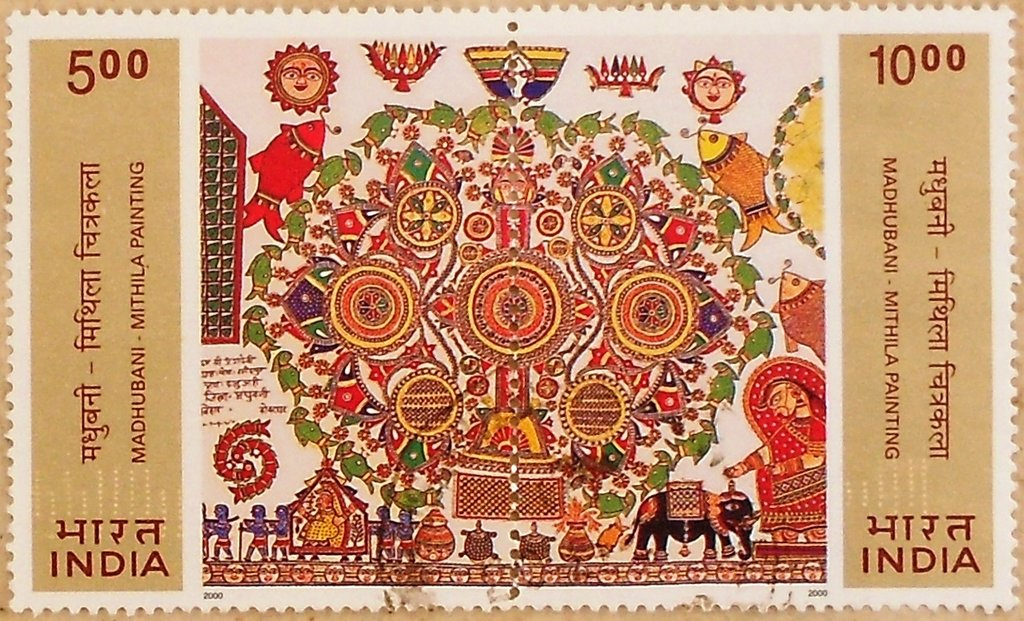
Madhubani Painting on Stamp of India, 2000

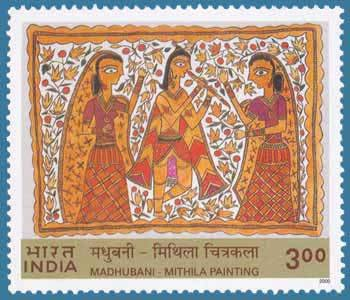
Krishna with Gopis on Stamp of India, 2000

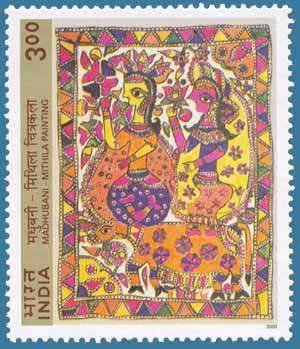
Bull and Sugriva on Stamp of India, 2000

Madhubani paintings on the wall of the Madhubani Railway Station.

== See also ==
- Fresco
- Mithila Chitrakala Sansthan
- 108 metres Mithila's Ramayana painting
