= Mahasundari Devi =

Indian artist

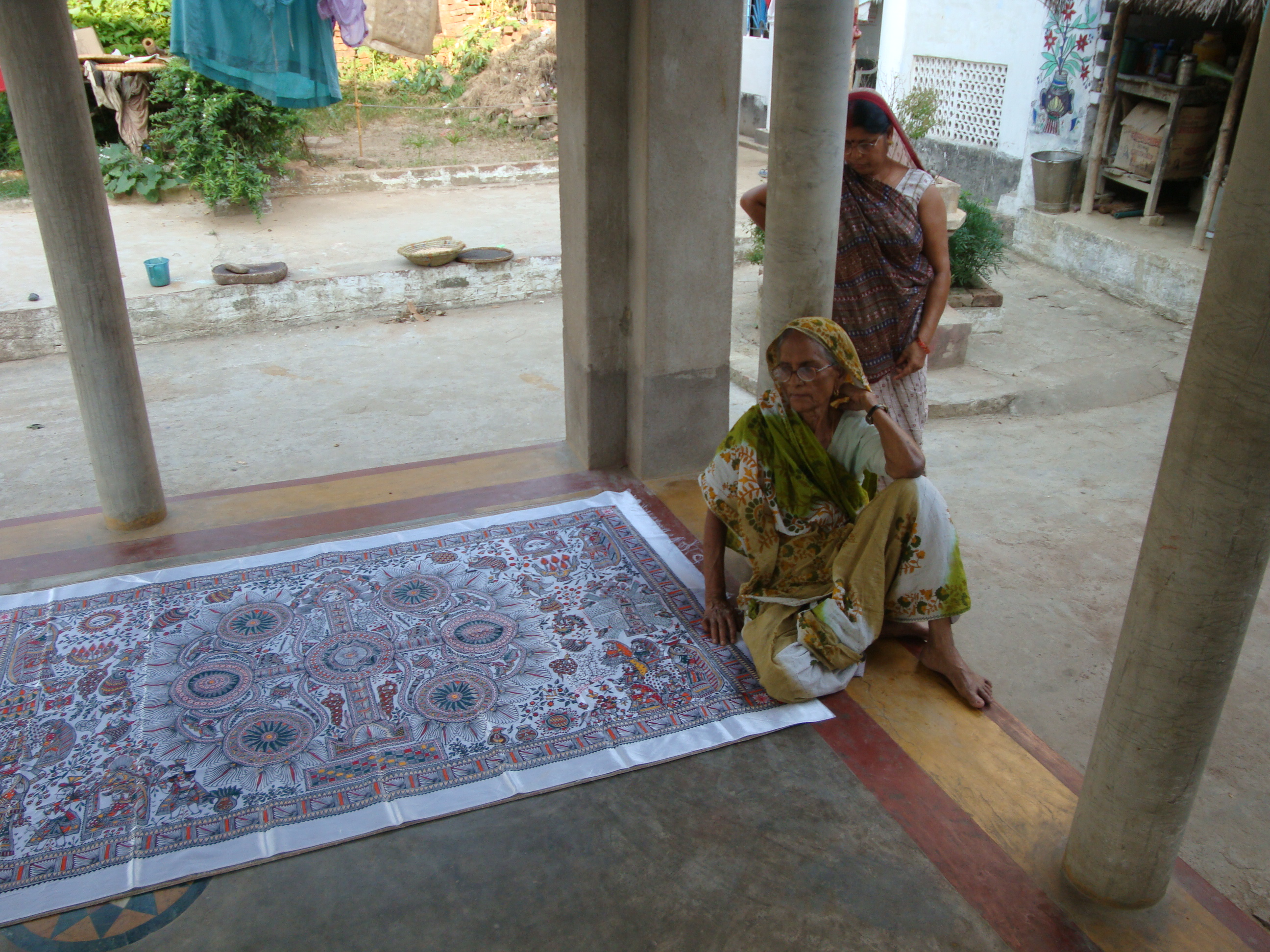
- Mahasundari Devi working
- Born: 6 April 1922; Benipatti, Madhubani, Bihar
- Died: 4 July 2013 (aged 91); Ranti, Madhubani, Bihar
- Known for: Mithila Painting
- Spouse: Krishna Kumar Das
- Awards: Padma Shri (2011)

Mahasundari Devi (6 April 1922 – 4 July 2013) was an Indian artist and Madhubani painter. She was awarded the Tulsi Samman by the Government of Madhya Pradesh in 1995, and in 2011 she received the Padma Shri award from the Government of India.

== Early and personal life ==
Mahasundari Devi was born on 6 April 1922 in Benipatti, Madhubani, Bihar, India into a Maithil Karna Kayastha family. She was barely literate but began painting and learning the Madhubani art from her aunt.She married a school teacher, Krishna Kumar Das, when she was 18.Devi was a resident of Ranti village located in Madhubani, Bihar and had two daughters and three sons.

== Career ==
In 1961, Devi left the purdah (veil) system, which was prevalent at the time and created her own niche as an artist. She founded a cooperative society called Mithila Hastashilp Kalakar Audyogki Sahyog Samiti, which supported the growth and development of handicrafts and artists. In addition to Mithila painting, Devi was known for her expertise in clay, papier-mache, sujani, and Sikki. According to her family, Devi created her last painting in 2011.

== Recognition ==
She received her first felicitation in 1976 from the Bhartiya Nritya Kala for an illustration of the struggles of a Maithil girl. She received the National Award from the president of India, Neelam Sanjeeva Reddy, in 1982. Devi was considered a “living legend” of the art of painting. She was awarded the Tulsi Samman by the Government of Madhya Pradesh in 1995, and the Shilp Guru award in 2007. She received the Padma Shri award from the government of India, in 2011, for her contributions to the field of art.

== Death ==
Devi died on 4 July 2013 in a private hospital, with sources citing her age at 92. She was cremated with full state honours the next day.

== Legacy ==
Mahasundari Devi daughter-in-law, Bibha Das, is also a Madhubani painter, as is her sister-in-law, Karpoori Devi.
