= Lalit Narayan Mithila University =

Public university in Darbhanga, Bihar, India

Coordinates: 26.1610°N 85.8965°E

- Motto: Ātmā vā are draṣṭavyaḥ
- Motto in English: Only this soul is worthy of knowing
- Type: Public
- Established: 1972 (54 years ago)
- Chancellor: Governor of Bihar
- Vice-Chancellor: Sanjay Kumar Choudhary
- Location: Darbhanga, Bihar, India
- Campus: Urban
- Website: www.lnmu.ac.in

The Lalit Narayan Mithila University (LNMU) is a public university in India. Beginning in 1972, the university initially functioned from the Mohanpur House at Sara Mohanpur village on the Darbhanga-Sakri route. In 1975, it shifted to a new campus on the grounds of the former royal palace of the Raj Darbhanga dynasty.

The university is in Darbhanga town, Mithila, an ancient cultural region of North India that lies between the lower range of the Himalayas and the Ganges river. The university imparts education in fields such as humanities, social science, life science, commerce, and medicine, with both undergraduate and postgraduate courses. More than 400 faculties are engaged in teaching and research.

The institute has a residential campus of about 230 acres with modern facilities and support services for its students and faculty. The university has the privilege of having major Student unions such as NSUI, AISF, JAAP, JDU, RJD, and ABVP Student Unions.

== Colleges ==
Its jurisdiction extends over 4 districts - Begusarai, Darbhanga, Madhubani, and Samastipur.

=== Constituent colleges ===
S.No	College	College Code	Location
1	A.N.D. College	401	Shahpur Patori, Samastipur
2	A.P.S.M. College	101	Barauni, Begusarai
3	B. M. A. College	201	Baheri, Darbhanga
4	B. M. College	301	Rahika, Madhubani
5	Bali Ram Bhagat College	402	Samastipur
6	Chandra Mukhi Bhola College	302	Deorh, Ghoghardiha, Madhubani
7	C. M. J. College	303	Donwarihat, Khutauna, Madhubani
8	C. M. Science College, Darbhanga	204	Darbhanga
9	C. M. College	202	Darbhanga
10	D.B. College	304	Jainagar
11	D. B. K. N. College	403	Narhan
12	Dr. Karpoori Bishweshwar Das College	404	Tajpur, Samastipur
13	G. D. College	103	Begusarai
14	G.K.P.D College	413	Karpoorigram, Samastipur
15	G. M. R. D. College	405	Mohanpur
16	H. P. S. College	305	Madhepur, Darbhanga
17	Janta Koshi College	205	Biraul, Darbhanga
18	J. M. D. P. L. College	306	Madhubani
19	Jagdish Nandan College	307	Madhubani
20	J. N. College, Nehra	206	Nehra, Darbhanga
21	Kunwar Singh College	207	Darbhanga
22	K. V. Science College	308	Uchchaith, Benipatti, Madhubani
23	L. N. Janta College	309	Jhanjharpur, Madhubani
24	Maharani Kalyani College	208	Laheriasarai, Darbhanga
25	M. K. S. College	209	Trimuhan(Chandauna), Darbhanga
26	B.P.S College	310	Babhangama, Bihariganj
27	M. L. S. M. College	210	Darbhanga
28	M. R. M. College	211	Darbhanga
29	Marwari college	212	Darbhanga
30	Millat College	213	Laheriasarai, Darbhanga
31	R. B. College	406	Dalsingsarai, Samastipur
32	R. B. S. College	106	Andaur, Mohiuddinnagar
33	R. C. S. College	104	Manjhaul
34	R. k. College	311	Madhubani
35	R. N. A. R. College	408	Samastipur
36	Rash Narayan College	312	Pandaul (Madhubani)
37	S. K. Mahila College	105	Begusarai
38	Samastipur College	409	Samastipur
39	Uma Pandey College	411	Pusa, Samastipur
40	U. R. College	410	Rosera, Samastipur
41	Vishweshwar Singh Janta College	313	Rajnagar, Madhubani
42	Women's College	412	Samastipur

=== Affiliated colleges ===
S.No.	Name	College Code	Location
1	Ayachi Mithila Mahila College	214	Bahera, Darbhanga
2	Bahera College	215	Bahera, Darbhanga
3	C R College		Kishanpur, Samastipur
4	Dev Narayan Yadav College	315	Madhubani
5	K S R College	415	Sarairanjan, Samastipur
7	Lohiya Charan Singh College	222	Darbhanga
8	Mahatma Gandhi College	223	Darbhanga
9	Mithila Mahila College	226	Darbhanga
10	Mithila Minority Dental College & Hospital		Darbhanga
11	Maharaja Mahesh Thakur Mithila College	224	Darbhanga
12	Maharaja Rameswar Singh Memorial College	225	Anandpur, Darbhanga
13	Nagendra Jha Mahila College	229	Laheriasarai, Darbhanga
14	B.P.S INTER AND DEGREE College	317	Babhangama, Madhepura
15	P L M College	318	Jhanjharpur, Madhubani
16	Qaji Ahmad Degree College	231	Jale, Darbhanga
17	Ram Ballabh Jalan College	232	Darbhanga
18	R C S Smarak College		Bihat, Begusarai
19	R L S R S M Degree College		Shivaji Nagar, Samastipur
20	S K College		Thatiya, Samastipur
21	S M J College	319	Khajedih, Madhubani
22	S.N.K.M. College	320	Bhairavsthan, Madhubani
23	S M R C K College		Samastipur
24	Vidhi Mahavidyalaya		Samastipur
25	Lutan Jha College		Nanur
26	Lalit Narayan Mishra Teachers Training College		Saharsa
27	C M B college Deorh, Ghoghardiha		Madhubani

28 B P S DEGREE COLLEGE BABHANGAMA BIHARIGANJ MADHEPURA, Bhola Paswan Shastri Degree College Babhangama Bihariganj Madhepura ।

29 B P S College Babhangama Bihariganj Madhepura[Director-Dinanath Prabodh][GANDHI GYAN MANDIR BABHANGAMA BIHARIGANJ MADHEPURA] (Principal-Atulesh Verma, BABUL JEE)

== Departments ==
- Department of Ancient Indian History
- Department of Bio-technology
- Department of Botany
- Department of Physics
- Department of Chemistry
- Department of Commerce & Business Administration
- Department of Economics
- Department of English
- Department of Hindi
- Department of Geography
- Department of Home Science
- Department of Maithili
- Department of Political Science
- Department of Psychology
- Department of Sanskrit
- Department of Sociology
- Department of Sports & Culture
- Department of Urdu
- Department of Zoology
- Department of Mathematics
- Department of Music and Dramatics
- Department of Sports
- Department of Philosophy
Campus Buildings

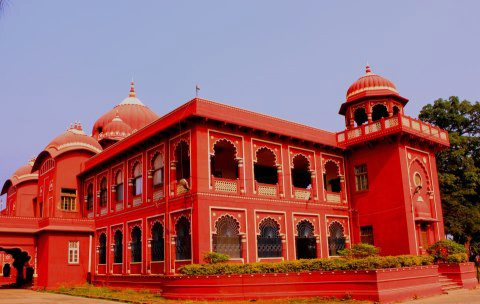
Main Campus (Raj Darbhanga Place)

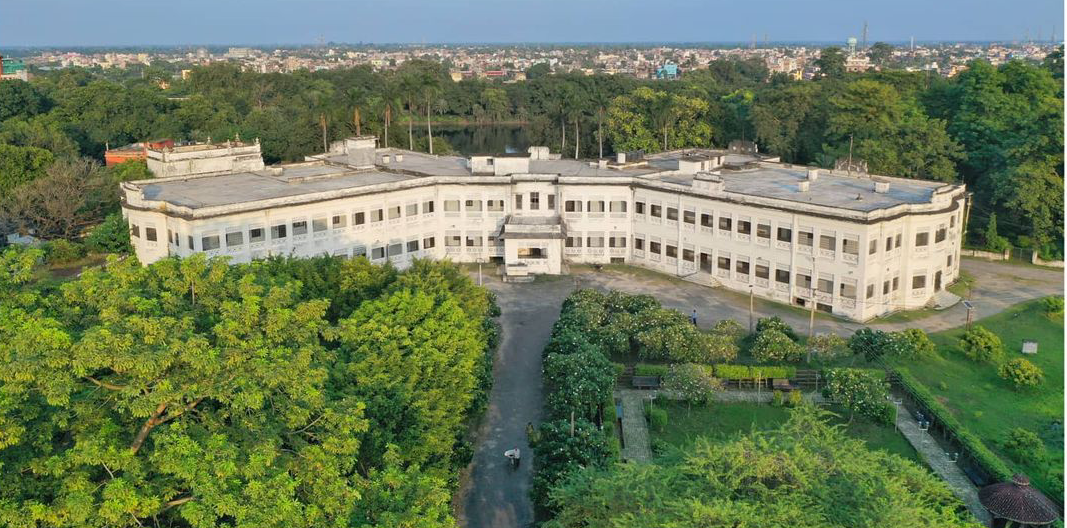
University Departments and Maharajadhiraj Kameshwara Singh Museum (Nargona Palace)

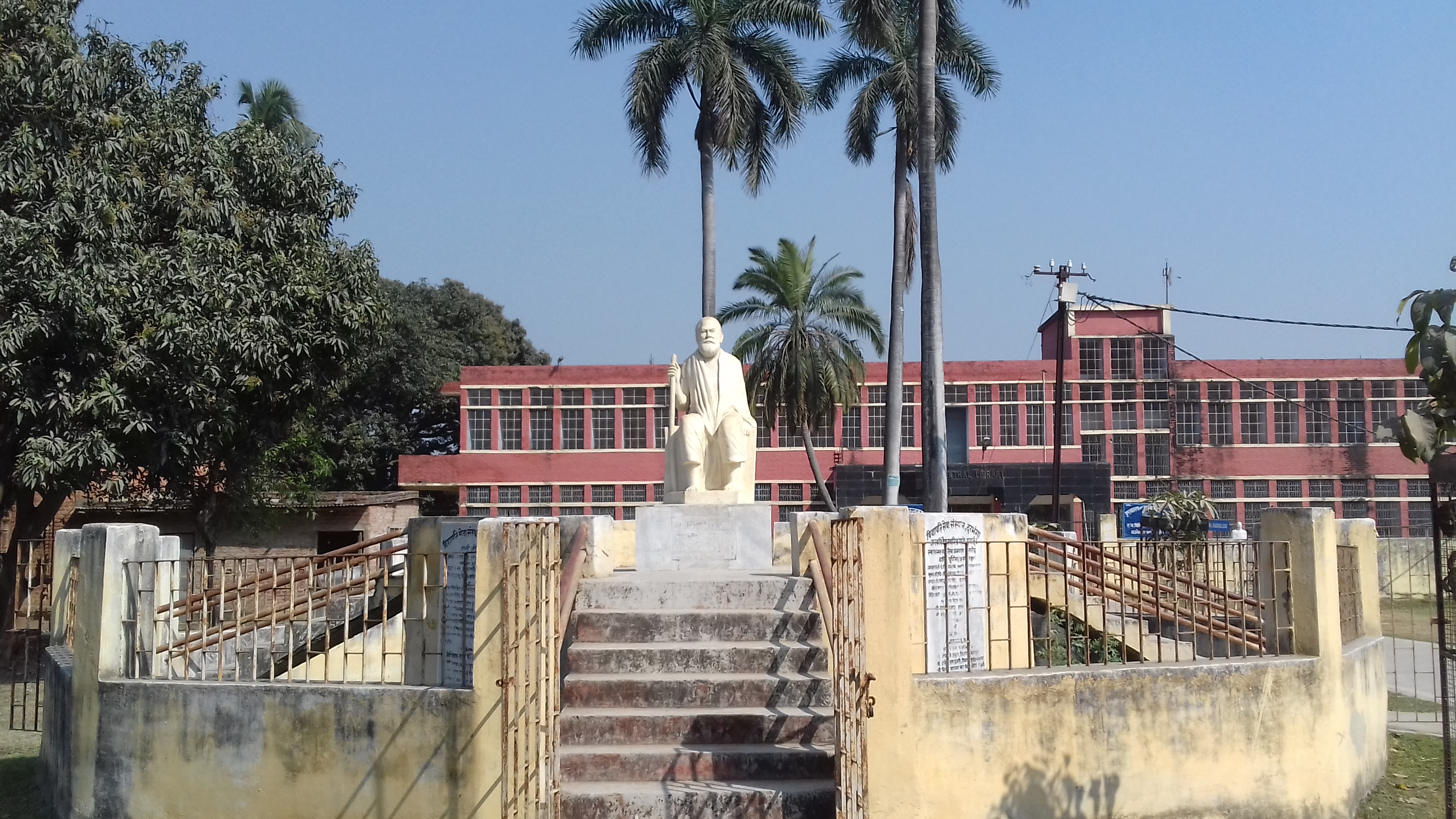
Library and park

== Major buildings ==
- Nagendra Jha Stadium
- Jubilee Hall
- Nargauna Palace
- Gandhi Guest House
- Muiltipurpose Hall

== Notable alumni ==
- Gopal Jee Thakur, member of Parliament From Darbhanga (Lok Sabha Constituency)
- Sharda Sinha
- Ram Baran Yadav, first president of Nepal
- Simon Britto Rodrigues, former member of the Kerala Legislative Assembly
- Subrata Roy

Notable faculty alumni

- Saket Kushwaha Vice-Chancellor of Rajiv Gandhi University and former Vice-Chancellor of Lalit Narayan Mithila University
