= Mithila Chitrakala Sansthan =

Madhubani (Mithila) painting institute in Bihar

Coordinates: 26.389°N 86.041°E

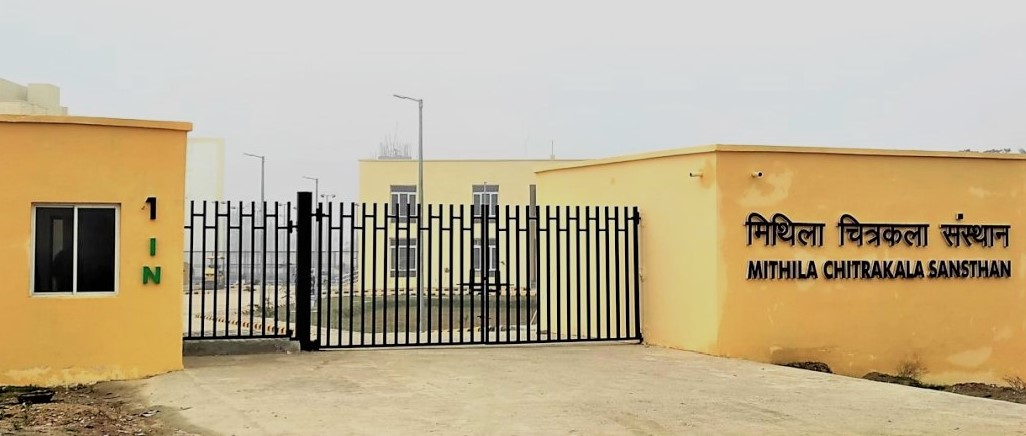
- View of main entrance of the Mithila Chitrakala Sansthan
- Other name: मिथिला चित्रकला संस्थान
- Founder: Nitish Kumar
- Mission: Preservation of the cultural art and painting in the Mithila region.
- Focus: Madhubani painting
- Location: Saurath Sabha, Madhubani, Bihar, India

The Mithila Chitrakala Sansthan (Maithili: मिथिला चित्रकला संस्थान) (lit. 'Mithila Painting Institute') is a cultural art institute dedicated to the cultural heritage of Madhubani painting in the Mithila region of Bihar in India. It is located near the Saurath Sabha on the outskirts of Madhubani in Bihar. The art institute was established to promote the cultural legacy of Madhubani painting (also known as Mithila painting) by training professionals in the field. The establishment of the institute has helped Madhubani painting gain more recognition in recent years. The institute was established by the initiative of the then chief minister Nitish Kumar in the state of Bihar. The institute offers certificate and degree courses.

== History ==
The Mithila Chitrakala Sansthan was inaugurated on 5 May 2022 by the chief minister Nitish Kumar through an online video conference.

On 15 August 2026 during the occasion of the 80th Independence Day of India, the world longest 108 metres Mithila's Ramayana painting was inaugurated by the Rajya Sabha MP Sanjay Kumar Jha in the presence of the District Magistrate Anand Sharma, an IAS officer.
