= Mohan Mishra =

Indian physician (1937–2021)

- Born: 19 May 1937; Koilakh, Madhubani, Bihar, India
- Died: 6 May 2021 (aged 83); Laheriasarai, Darbhanga, Bihar
- Occupation: Physician
- Spouse: Manjula Mishra
- Children: Matangi, Muktakeshi, Narottam, Udbhatt
- Awards: Padma Shri; Dr Rajendra Prasad Oration Award; Delhi Administration Award; Wishing Shelf Award

Mohan Mishra (19 May 1937 - 6 May 2021) was an Indian physician, known for his studies on Visceral leishmaniasis, (Kala Azar) and its treatment using Amphotericin B, regarded by many as a pioneering attempt. The Government of India honoured him, in 2014, with the award of Padma Shri, the fourth highest civilian award, for his contributions to the fields of medicine.

== Biography ==
Mohan Mishra was born in Koilakh, in the Madhubani district of the Indian state of Bihar on 19 May 1937. After securing his medical credentials, Dr. Mishra started his career as a resident medical officer at Darbhanga Medical College and Hospital (DMCH) in 1962 where he continued till 1995. During his stint at the DMCH, he took a sabbatical in 1970 to secure MRCP from the UK. In 1979, Mishra became the Professor of the General Medicine department. Another higher degree of FRCP was obtained in 1984 from Edinburgh and two years later, in 1986, he became the Head of the Department of General Medicine at the DMCH. He also secured an FRCP from London in 1988. Dr. Mishra retired in 1995, voluntarily ending his career at the DMCH.

== Legacy ==
Mishra's studies on Visceral leishmaniasis are considered by many as his most notable contribution. Leishmaniasis, the second largest parasitic killer after Malaria and known locally as Kala Azar, was a common disease in the area and, after extensive research funded by the World Health Organization, Dr. Mishra proposed the use of Amphotericin B (Fungizone) to combat the disease through an article he published in Lancet in 1991. The proposal is regarded as a pioneering one and the drug is the one most commonly used the world over to treat Kala Azar.

Mishra is also credited with research on arsenic in drinking water. His studies on the subject, assisted by his son, Narottam Mishra who is an information scientist at the Kameshwar Singh Darbhanga Sanskrit University, have been successful in finding a cost-effective way to eliminate arsenic from drinking water by using food-grade alum.

He has shown that Brahmi (Bacopa monnieri), a herb traditionally used in India, can be effective in the treatment of Dementias. This study is registered in a WHO Primary Registry (ISRCTN18407424).

His study was presented as an eposter at the Innovation in Medicine 2018 RCP annual conference, London 25–26 June 2018 (RCP18-EP-196: BRAHMI (Bacopa monnieri Linn) in the Treatment of Dementias- A Pilot Study) and it has been published in Future Healthcare Journal.

Dr. Mishra is the author of A Textbook of Clinical Medicine, published by the Oxford University Press and Clinical Methods in Medicine a guide on clinical examination of patients.

- Mohan Mishra (2006). Clinical Methods in Medicine. BI Publications. p. 232. ISBN 9788172252298.

He has also written several non fiction books such as:

- Unfinished Story: A History of the Indian Freedom Movement 1857-1947
- Building an Empire - Chanakya Revisited
- Mangal Pandey to Lakshmibai: A Story of the Indian Mutiny 1857
- India Through Alien Eyes

Mishra has also written many articles in international scientific journals such as Lancet and British Medical Journal.

Mohan Mishra lived in Bengali Tola in Laheriasarai, the twin city of Darbhanga, in North Bihar engaging himself with social activities such as free medical camps in remote villages in the Darbhanga, Jhanjharpur and Madhubani districts.

== Positions ==
Mohan Mishra has served on two expert committees on Kala Azar set up by the Government of Bihar and the Government of India and has been an expert member of the Union Public Service Commission (UPSC). He has also served as the Inspector of the Medical Council of India for the master's degree examinations of Assam University, Silchar and Tamil University, Tanjavur. His research paper presentations at various national and international scientific conferences included the annual conferences of the Association of Physicians of India and the World Congress of Cardiology, held in 1986 at Washington DC.

== Awards and recognition ==
Mohan Mishra is a recipient of the Dr Rajendra Prasad Oration award which the Rajendra Prasad Memorial Research Institute, Patna conferred on him for his studies on Kala Azar. He has been honoured by the Delhi Administration for his literary work on the Indian freedom movement. His book, India Through Alien Eyes, won the Wishing Shelf Award in 2012. The Government of India awarded him the Padma Shri, in 2014, by including him in the Republic day honours.

== Publications ==
- Mohan Mishra (1976). "A Textbook of Clinical Medicine". Oxford University Press. p. 228.
- Mohan Mishra (2006). Clinical Methods in Medicine. BI Publications. p. 232. ISBN 9788172252298.
- Mohan Mishra, Narottam Mishra (2012). India Through Alien Eyes. Balboa Press. p. 180. ISBN 978-1452504537.
- Mohan Mishra (1988). "Unfinished Story: A History of the Indian Freedom Movement 1857-1947". National Library. p. 137.
- Mohan Mishra (2004). Building an Empire - Chanakya Revisited. Rupa and Co. p. 300. ISBN 978-8129104755.
- Mohan Mishra (2009). Mangal Pandey to Lakshmibai: A Story of the Indian Mutiny 1857. PublishAmerica. p. 130. ISBN 978-1448919260.

== See also ==
- Leishmaniasis
- Amphotericin B
