= Bharti Dayal =

Indian artist

- Born: December 1961 (age 64); Samastipur, Bihar, India
- Occupation: Painter
- Years active: 1984–present
- Known for: Madhubani (Mithila) paintings
- Website: https://bhartidayal.com/

Bharti Dayal (born December, 1961 in Samastipur) is an Indian artist who specializes in Madhubani art.

== Biography ==
Dayal was born in the Samastipur district of North Bihar, the Mithila region famous for Madhubani painting. She has completed her Bachelors in Science (B.Sc) and completed her postgraduation with a Masters in Science (M.Sc).

Since 1991, she has lived in Delhi.

== Work ==
Bharti Dayal showing how Madhubani Paintings are made.

From a young age, Dayal was taught Madhubani painting by her mother and grandmother. She pursued the art form professionally from 1984. She has worked to bring innovation in the traditional art practiced in Mithila, and train other women artists from the region at her studio in New Delhi.

Her style is known for bringing a contemporary cast to traditional Madhubani art using modern media such as acrylic and canvas. She paints with natural, vegetable-based colors. Her renditions of Krishna and Radha are said to depict undercurrents of "love, longing, and peace".

== Exhibitions ==
Dayal has held numerous exhibitions of her work nationally and internationally. Her Madhubani art was the subject of a documentary shown on French television in 1995. An exhibition of her works in acrylic on canvas painted between June 2015 and June 2016 was organized by the Museum of Sacred Art (MOSA).

Dayal's seven Madhubani paintings, which are a combination of traditional art with contemporary modern subjects, are included in the book The New Bihar. Her illustration for the book's cover includes a girl riding a bicycle, symbolizing the "empowerment of women and the quest for education", and a fish, which denotes the theme of "rainbow agriculture", or the blending of agricultural pursuits to enhance rural income. Book authors N.K. Singh and Nicholas Stern have observed: "Bharti's use of the traditional style on contemporary themes can contribute to the revival of Madhubani art".

== Awards ==
- AIFACS
- Millennium award
- National Merit awards
- 2006: India's National Award for excellence in handicrafts

== Publications ==
- Madhubani Art. Niyogi Books. 2016. ISBN 978-9385285080.

Cover art

- Brueck, Laura R. (2014). Writing Resistance: The Rhetorical Imagination of Hindi Dalit Literature. Columbia University Press. ISBN 978-0-231-16604-1.
- Singh, N. K.; Stern, Nicholas (2013). The New Bihar. HarperCollins Publishers India. ISBN 978-93-5029-642-4.
- Cover Art for 'Language Politics and Public sphere in North India. Making of the Maithili Movement by Mithilesh kumar jha. Publisher: Oxford University Press; ISBN 0-19-947934-8

== Bibliography ==
- Singh, N. K.; Stern, Nicholas (23 August 2013). The New Bihar. HarperCollins Publishers India. ISBN 978-93-5029-642-4.
