= Prem Chandra Mishra =

Indian politician

Chairperson - Zero Hour Committee Bihar Legislative Council
- Incumbent
- Assumed office 3 June 2021

Media Panelist AICC
- Incumbent
- Assumed office 2013

President Of Bihar NSUI
- In office 1987–1995

Personal details
- Born: 25 December 1961 (age 64) Madhubani, Bihar, India
- Party: Indian National Congress
- Spouse: Suman Mishra
- Children: 2
- Education: Patna University B.A, M.A (History)

Prem Chandra Mishra is an Indian politician and member of the Bihar Legislative Council. In the elections on 23 March, 11 candidates were elected unopposed. He is also the AICC media panelist.

== Early life and career ==
Mishra was born on 25 December 1961. He studied in Watson School, Madhubani. He joined the NSUI at the age of 17. He participated in many events in Madhubani. He was recognised by the then Prime Minister Shri Rajiv Gandhi and senior leaders like Sitaram Kesri and was made All India NSUI General Secretary. He was given the charge of A number of states like Haryana, Punjab, Himachal Pradesh, Delhi and Jammu and Kashmir. He conducted massive rally's for the congress party and got appointed as the President of Bihar NSUI. Since his early days he was passionate about social work. In his pursuit of passion, he actively participated in the politics since school days.

== Political career ==
=== Petition In Fodder Scam ===
- He is popularly known for being one of the chief petitioner's in the fodder scam against the then Chief Minister Lalu Prasad Yadav. The other petitioner's were Sushil Modi from BJP, Shivanand Tiwari from Rjd, Saryu Rai from BJP and Rajiv Ranjan alias Lallan Singh from JD(U). He was suspended from the party by Sitaram Kesri for doing so but later brought back when Mrs. Sonia Gandhi took charge as the Indian National Congress President. It is believed that the Congress party lost its golden opportunity to take a firm stand against Lalu Prasad Yadav and make itself strong again in Bihar when his stand was disowned.
- His Anti Lalu Stand caused him to lose the chance of becoming the President of All India Youth Congress. Sitaram Kesri who had a soft corner for Lalu Yadav and leaders like Jagannath Mishra (accused in fodder scam) in 1994 convinced the then Congress President P.V. Narasimha Rao to cancel his appointment with immediate effect. The reason was the standby support by Lalu's Party in the loksabha to the Indian National Congress.

=== Role in Bihar Politics ===
- Mishra surrounded the Bihar Legislative Assembly in 1994 with around 15000 NSUI workers in a reaction to the shooting of a student by Bihar Police in Dalsinghsarai. The then Patna SP Ajoy Kumar who later joined the congress in jharkhand was unable to control the angry crowd. Ultimately, The Chief Minister had to give monetary concession to the injured student and the medical expenses were taken care of as a result of the protest.
- After he left the post of Bihar NSUI President in 1995 the NSUI in Bihar became weaker. Many leaders from under his tenure left the NSUI to join other regional parties. Ajit Kumar became a minister in Nitish Kumar's Government and Kaushal Yadav became a MLA too.

=== Maithili Language ===
- He has been addressing a lot of people on a lot of occasions in Bihar and in Delhi about the political avarice Mr. Nitish Kumar has for Maithili Language. He thanked Former Prime Minister Shri Atal Bihari Vajpayee in the Bihar Legislative Council for inclusion of Maithili Language in the Eighth Schedule to the Constitution of India but went on to say that it's very sad that for past 2 decades Maithili isn't being taught in the schools of Bihar. He believes that this will not allow people to become Civil Servants by opting Maithili as an optional subject in the UPSC CSE because no teachers have been appointed. He says Mr. Nitish Kumar should make Maithili a compulsory subject in the schools of Bihar because Majority of People in Bihar speak in Maithili Bhasha.

== Positions Held in Org. ==
- Madhubani District NSUI President.
- All India NSUI Secretary/ General Secretary.
- Bihar NSUI President.
- Secretary Bihar Pradesh Congress Committee.
- Chief Spokesman Bihar Pradesh Congress Committee.
- General Secretary Bihar Pradesh Congress Committee.
- Vice President Bihar Pradesh Congress Committee.
- All India Congress Committee Media Panelist Spokesman.
