= Chandramani Datta =

Indian writer

Chandramani Datta was a 13th-century Maithili writer born in Madhubani, Bihar, India.
