= Jagdish Nandan College =

College in Madhubani district

Coordinates: 26.3600°N 86.0722°E

- जगदीश नंदन कॉलेज
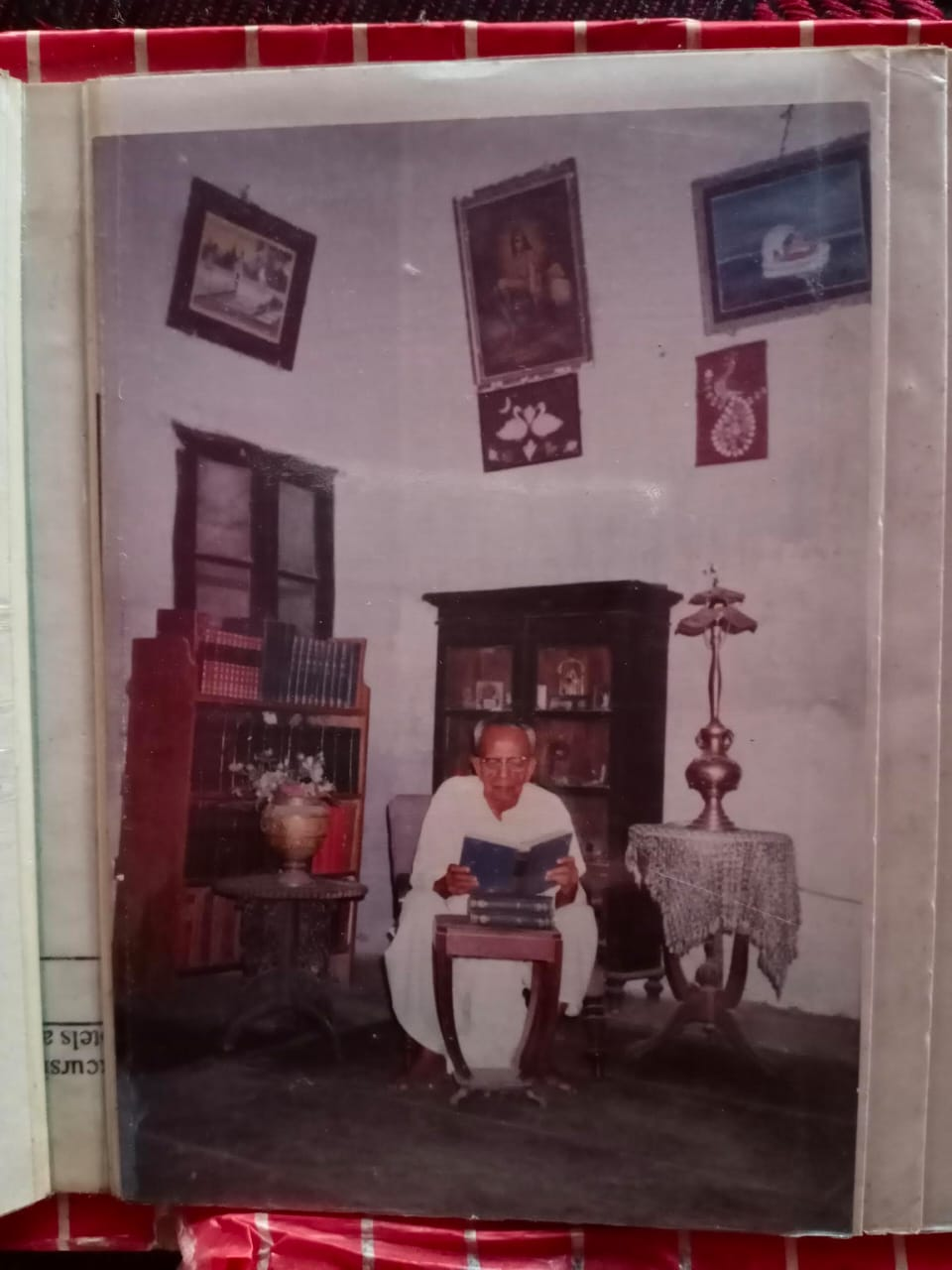
- Babusaheb Jagadish Nandan Singh, founder of the college in the 1990s at Madhubani Deorhi.
- Type: Government college
- Established: 1959
- Founder: Babushaeb Jagadish Nandan Singh
- Parent institution: Lalit Narayan Mithila University
- Affiliations: Lalit Narayan Mithila University
- Principal: Dr Phulo Paswan
- Location: Madhubani, India
- Campus: Urban
- Website: jncollegemdb.com

Jagdish Nandan College also known as J. N. College, Madhubani is a constituent degree college of the Lalit Narayan Mithila University, Darbhanga. It is located in the city of Madhubani in the Mithila region of Bihar. It is a co-educational institute providing education up to graduation in the stream of science, commerce, humanities and social sciences. It is also affiliated to the Bihar School Examination Board, Patna for +2 (intermediate college) students admitted in the college.

The college holds more than 8,000 students. The examinations of the students enrolled in the college, are conducted and examined by the Lalit Narayan Mithila University.

== History ==
The college was initially established at Babubarhi in the year 1959. Later in the year 1962, it was transferred in the city of Madhubani. The foundation of the college was incepted by Babushaeb Jagadish Nandan Singh in 1962. Babu Jagdish Nandan Singh was born on 1 October 1913. He was the son of Babu Hitendra Singh of Madhubani Deorhi(chota traf). The college was named after him.Babu Jagadish Nandan Singh died on 5 June 1997. His wife was Gunjeshwari Bahuaasin, who also played an important role in this.She was born in 1928 at his paternal village Ujaan (Barka Gaam) and died on 30 May 2024 at Madhubani Deorhi.

== Administration ==
The present principal of the college is Dr. Phulo Paswan, since 28 September 2024. Before him Dr. Anil Kumar Chaudhary was the principal.

== Notable alumni ==
- Kameshwar Choupal - A former trustee of the Ram Janmabhoomi Tirtha Kshetra Trust and former member of the Bihar Legislative Council and former provincial president of Vishwa Hindu Parishad.
- Chandra Shekhar Jha Azad - The former associate professor of the college and currently an author cum correspondent at the India's popular magazine The Times of India.
- Dr. Nagendra Narayan Jha - Born on 28 April 1942.

A former reader and lecturer in the Maithili Department and the "Gold Medalist" in M.A.(Master of Arts) from the Patna University in 1965-67. He served the college from 1968 to 2004 almost 36 years. He was the prominent member of Madhubani Deorhi chota traf. He died on 30 September 2025.
