= Shanti Devi Paswan =

Indian artist

- Born: 4 March 1958 (age 68); Laheriyaganj, Bihar, India
- Occupation: Indian Mithila Folk Artist
- Known for: Godna style of Mithila painting
- Spouse: Shivan Paswan
- Parents: Ramchandra Paswan (father); kaushalya Devi (mother)
- Awards: Padma Shri

Shanti Devi Paswan is an Indian artist from Bihar, known for her work in the Godna style of Mithila painting. She belongs to the Dusadh caste, a community traditionally associated with this region. Shanti has adapted Godna painting, which has its origins in tattooing practices, into a notable form of Mithila art. Her work has been showcased internationally, including in the United States, Japan, Denmark, Malaysia, Germany and Hong Kong.

In January 2024, Shanti was awarded the Padma Shri, India's fourth-highest civilian honor, for her contributions in Godna painting.

== Early life and career ==
Shanti Devi, born in Laheriaganj in the Madhubani district, started her journey in Mithila painting, facing challenges due to her Dalit background. She played a role in developing the Godna style.

Together with her husband, Shivan Paswan, Shanti Devi has trained over 20,000 artists in the Godna style, contributing to the preservation of this traditional art form. In 2023, her paintings were featured at the G20 meeting in New Delhi, India.

== Awards and honours ==
In 1979–80, she received the State Award from the Government of Bihar for her contributions.

In 2024, Shanti Devi received the Padma Shri from the Government of India for her contributions to the Godna style of Mithila painting.
