= Laheriasarai railway station =

Railway station in Darbhanga, Bihar, India

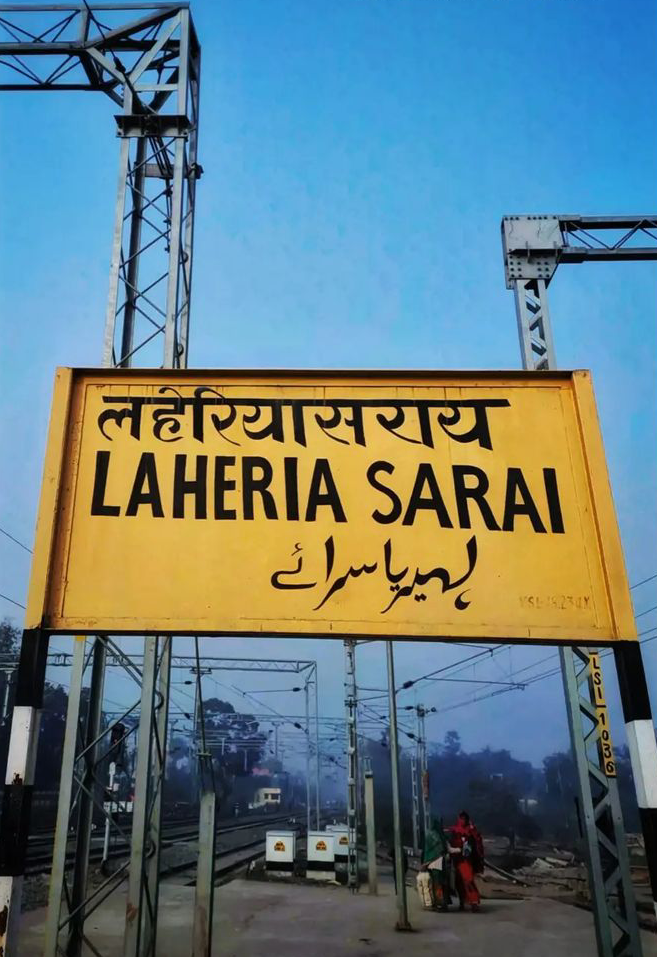
- Laheriasarai Station

General information
- Location: Kabipur, Laheriasarai, Darbhanga, Bihar; India
- Coordinates: 25.1719°N 86.093°E
- Elevation: 55 metres (180 ft)
- System: Indian Railways station
- Owner: Indian Railways
- Operator: East Central Railways
- Line: Barauni–Gorakhpur, Raxaul and Jainagar lines
- Platforms: 3
- Tracks: 5

Construction
- Structure type: Standard on ground
- Parking: Available

Other information
- Status: Functional
- Station code: LSI
- Zone(s): East Central Railway zone
Location
- Location within Bihar Location within India

Laheriasarai railway station, (station code: LSI), is the railway station serving Laheriasarai in the Darbhanga district in the Indian state of Bihar. The laheriasarai railway station is connected to most of the major cities in India by the railway network.

Laheriasarai has trains running frequently to Sitamarhi and Kolkata.

== Platforms ==
There are three platforms in Laheriasarai railway station. The platforms are interconnected with one foot overbridge (FOB).

== Trains ==
Laheriasarai Junction railway station is a station of the East Central Railways. It is located on the Samastipur to Darbhanga rail route. Trains like Swatantra Senani Superfast Express and Jaynagar–Anand Vihar Garib Rath Express, halts here.

== Nearest airports ==
The nearest airports to Laheriasarai Station is:

- Darbhanga Airport, Darbhanga

== See also ==
- Darbhanga
