= Ambika Devi (artist) =

Indian folk artist

Ambika Devi is an Indian artist, who works in the Madhubani art tradition. In 2009, she received the National Handicrafts Award for her contributions to art.

== Life ==
Devi was born in Rasidpur village in Madhubani district, Bihar, and married into a family that was sustained by farming. She has stated that she initially painted at night, when work on the farm was completed, but later turned to painting as a career when she and her husband moved to Delhi. Her mother, Leela Devi, and her sister are also both award-winning Madhubani artists.

== Career ==
Devi has stated that she learned to paint and draw in the Madhubani style from her mother, Leela Devi, who was a well-known Madhubani artist herself. Her initial paintings were in the traditional form, done with white paint made from powdered rice, on the walls and floors of her home. Her childhood was spent in the Madhubani region in Bihar, where Madhubani art originates and she has described her early interest in the art as stemming from its prevalence: "As a child, I saw my mother and people at home painting everyday, so I was naturally drawn to this art at a very young age." Devi uses traditional motifs and patterns in her art, drawing from Hindu religious imagery as well as themes from nature. Devi prepares both, the paper and the paints that she uses herself, making handmade khadi paper and dyes sourced from plant and mineral material such as brown rice, tamarind, and charcoal. Devi has described Madhubani art as being an essential part of religious rituals in her community, with paintings used in religious and social ceremonies, including worship and marriage. In 2020, she and other Madhubani artists responded to the COVID-19 pandemic and subsequent lockdowns in India through art, depicting face masks, the washing of hands, and themes of isolation in the Madhubani style. In addition to her own art, Devi teaches Madhubani techniques and art to students, running workshops for the Government of India.

Devi's work has been part of multiple curated exhibitions and is sold to collectors as well. Her work was one of fifteen artists represented in the Dastkar Fashion Show, an event organised by the magazine Marie Claire to bring together traditional Indian art and handicrafts with modern fashion design. Her work was also exhibited at the Nantong International Contemporary Craft Biennale in 2014.

In 2009, she received the President of India's National Handicrafts Award for her contributions to art. The award was presented for a painting that she prepared on a large canvas, measuring 3 feet across and 5 feet long, depicting the Hindu god Krishna. In 2018, the Crafts Council of India awarded her the Kamala Award for Excellence in Craftsmanship. In 2021, she was awarded the Sanmaan Award for excellence in handicrafts by the Crafts Council of Telangana.
