= Madhubani Municipal Corporation =

Local civic body in Madhubani, Bihar, India

Type
- Type: Municipal corporation

History
- Founded: 2020; 6 years ago
- Seats: 45

Website
- nagarseva.bihar.gov.in/madhubani

Madhubani Municipal Corporation is the civic body governing Indian city of Madhubani. Municipal Corporation mechanism in India was introduced during British Rule with formation of municipal corporation in Madras (Chennai) in 1688, later followed by municipal corporations in Bombay (Mumbai) and Calcutta (Kolkata) by 1762. Madhubani Municipal Corporation is headed by Mayor of city and governed by Commissioner.

== History and administration ==
Madhubani Municipal Corporation was formed in year 2020 to improve the infrastructure of the town as per the needs of local population. Madhubani Municipal Corporation has been categorised into various wards and each ward is headed by councillor for which elections are held every 5 years.

Madhubani Municipal Corporation is governed by an elected Mayor and administered by Municipal Commissioner.

== Functions ==
Madhubani Municipal Corporation is created for the following functions:

- Planning for the town including its surroundings which are covered under its Department's Urban Planning Authority.
- Approving construction of new buildings and authorising use of land for various purposes.
- Improvement of the town's economic and Social status.
- Arrangements of water supply towards commercial, residential and industrial purposes.
- Planning for fire contingencies through Fire Service Departments.
- Creation of solid waste management, public health system and sanitary services.
- Working for the development of ecological aspect like development of Urban Forestry and making guidelines for environmental protection.
- Working for the development of weaker sections of the society like mentally and physically handicapped, old age and gender biased people.
- Making efforts for improvement of slums and poverty removal in the town.

== Revenue sources ==
The following are the Income sources for the corporation from the Central and State Government.

=== Revenue from taxes ===
Following is the Tax related revenue for the corporation:

- Property tax
- Profession tax
- Entertainment tax
- Grants from Central and State Government like Goods and Services Tax
- Advertisement tax

=== Revenue from non-tax sources ===
Following is the Non Tax related revenue for the corporation:

- Water usage charges
- Fees from Documentation services
- Rent received from municipal property
- Funds from municipal bonds

== See also ==
- List of municipal corporations in India.
