= Watson High School, Madhubani =

Watson High School
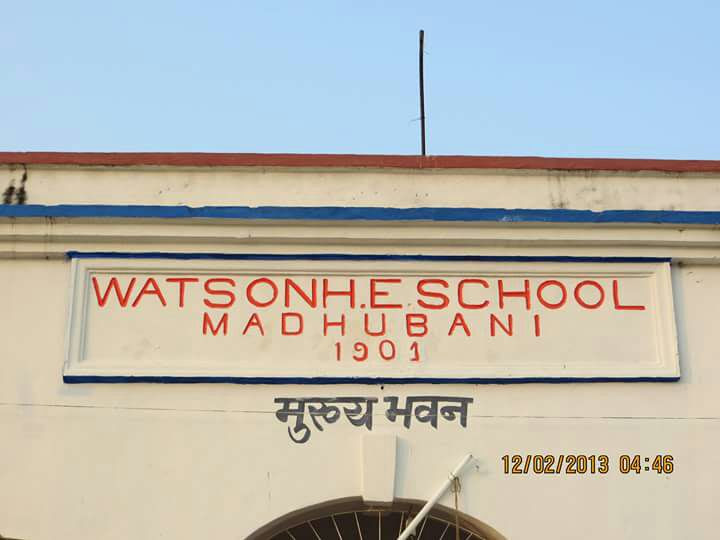

Location
- Madhubani, Bihar, 847211; India
- Coordinates: 26.3434°N 86.0735°E

Information
- Other name: Suraj Narayan Singh Dev Narayan Gurmaita Watson Boys High School
- Type: Sr. Sec. School/10+2
- Motto: Service Before Self
- Established: 1901; 125 years ago
- Founder: A. W. Watson
- Classes: IX to XII
- Campus type: Urban
- Affiliations: Bihar School Examination Board, BSEB

Watson High School Madhubani is a high school located in Madhubani, Bihar, India. It was established in 1901 by A. W. Watson, who was Sub-Divisional Officer in Madhubani from November 1900 to April 1903.

The school is affiliated to BSEB, Patna, and offers schooling from IX to Class XII.

Renamed as : Suraj Narayan Singh Dev Narayan Gurmaita Boys High School after 1997.

== Campus ==
Watson School is located at a highly visible site on Madhubani-Darbhanga highway .

== Alumni ==
- Dr. Ranjeet Kumar Jha (Ph.D., USA) (2004, Xth School Test Topper; Currently working at IIT Bombay)
- Dr. S.P. Narayan (PhD IISC, BANGALORE)

(1965-1966, IX & IX special) Former Chief Scientist at CSIR-AMPRI, Bhopal since 1987 to 2013.
