= Jitwarpur =

Cultural village in Mithila

- Village
- Jitwarpur
- Interactive map of Jitwarpur
- Country: India
- State: Bihar
- Region: Mithila
- District: Madhubani
- Block: Rahika

Population (2011)
  - Total: 3,319
- Demonym: Maithil

Languages
  - Official: Mother tongue; Ancient: Hindi; Maithili; Sanskrit

Jitwarpur is a historical village in the Madhubani district of the Mithila region in the state of Bihar in India. It is known for crafting arts of Madhubani paintings. It is located in Rahika block at a distance of 4 kilometres from the district headquarter of Madhubani. Maithili is the local language of the village. The village has been recognised as the first Shilpgram of Bihar. The total population of the village is 3319.

== Description ==
The village is situated at the north direction near the outskirts of the Madhubani town. The people of Jitwarpur village are known for crafting the arts of Madhubani paintings in the region. They are preserving the living tradition of the Madhubani painting also known as Mithila painting. The walls of houses in the village are generally decorated by the Madhubani arts and paintings.

The village is considered as the hub of Mithila arts and paintings, where women artists have been preserving and practicing the traditional arts and paintings of the Mithila region from several generations.

== Demographics ==
According to the population census 2011 of India, the total number of households in the village is 670. The total population of the village is 3319. Out of the total population, the number of males and females are 1721 and 1598 respectively.

The population of literate person in the village is 1586. As per the population census 2011, the literacy rate of the village is 47.79%.
