= Mithila Museum =

Museum for Madhubani art in Japan

Coordinates: 37°06′34″N 138°48′16″E

- Established: 1982
- Location: Tōkamachi, Niigata Prefecture, Japan
- Type: Art museum
- Founder: Tokio Hasegawa
- Architect: Karpuri Devi

Mithila Museum is a cultural heritage art museum in Japan. It was created by the Maithil artist Karpuri Devi from the Mithila region. It is located at Tokamachi hills in the Niigata region of Japan. It is housed in a converted schoolhouse in Tokamachi. It was established by Tokio Hasegawa in the year 1982. He was a lover of the Madhubani art and painting. The museum exhibits around two thousand Madhubani paintings having different themes and styles. In the year 2008, it became a treasure house of 15,000 exquisite Madhubani paintings.

== History ==
According to the founder, Tokio Hasegawa, the idea of establishing the Mithila Museum came to his mind in 1982, when a group of students approached him with 80 Madhubani paintings, which they purchased during their trip to Bihar in India. The group of students was looking for a place to exhibit these paintings. After that, the founder decided to establish a museum. In 1982, he established the Mithila Museum with 80 Madhubani paintings. In the year 1987, the Maithil artist Karpuri Devi from the Ranti village of the Madhubani district in the Mithila region of Bihar in India was invited to work in the Mithila Museum at Tokamachi in Japan. Karpuri Devi worked there and led to the development of the artworks in the museum. The founder of the museum, Tokio Hasegawa, was impressed by her works. She visited the museum nine times.

When the Mithila Museum was fully furnished, the founder, Tokio Hasegawa, invited the artist Karpuri Devi to inaugurate it. The artist Karpuri was felicitated by the museum authorities. The establishment of the Mithila Museum in Japan led to the gain of international recognition of the Madhubani art and paintings.
