= Rajiv Tyagi =

Indian politician (1967–2020)

- Born: 29 September 1967; India
- Died: 12 August 2020 (aged 52); Ghaziabad
- Education: MBA from the P. M. M.B.A. College Ghaziabad
- Occupation: Politician
- Political party: Indian National Congress
- Spouse: Sangeeta Tyagi
- Children: 2

Rajiv Tyagi (29 September 1967 – 12 August 2020) was a leader and spokesperson for Indian National Congress, known for being a prominent figure in news debates. He died on 12 August 2020 in Ghaziabad, shortly after a television appearance; his cause of death was reported variously as either a heart attack or cardiac arrest.

== Education and career ==
Tyagi had a post-graduate degree in Business administration.

A prominent Youth Congress Party leader, he was appointed the official spokesperson of Congress while serving as the General Secretary at Uttar Pradesh Congress Committee.

== Death ==
Tyagi was a participant in a TV debate on Hindi news channel Aaj Tak on the issue of 2020 Bangalore riots, when he likely suffered a heart attack. He collapsed just after the debate, following which he was brought to Yashoda Hospital, Ghaziabad, where doctors were unable to revive him.

According to his wife, his last words were 'They killed me,' referring to the TV debate format and Sambit Patra.
