= Ganga Devi (painter) =

Indian painter

Ganga Devi (1928 – 21 January 1991) was an Indian painter, considered by many as one of the leading exponents of Madhubani painting tradition. She is credited with popularizing the Madhubani painting outside India. She was born in 1928 in Mithila in the Indian state of Bihar in a Kayastha family and took to the traditional painting craft, specialising in the kachni (line drawing) style. She traveled abroad with her art and was a part of the Festival of India in the United States, which yielded a number of paintings under the title, America series, including Moscow Hotel, Festival of American Folk Life, and Ride in a Roller Coaster. The Government of India awarded her the National Master Craftsman Award and followed it up with the fourth highest civilian award of Padma Shri in 1984.

In the 1980s, Ganga Devi painted the famous mural Kohbar Ghar or bridal nuptial chamber at the Crafts Museum in Delhi. The Mural was painted over a period of three to four months while Ganga Devi was undergoing chemotherapy in a Delhi Hospital. The Mural was demolished as part of a renovation plan at the Museum in early 2015. A museum official told The Wire that Ganga Devi’s work was removed during renovation because it was deteriorating as the mud and paint were peeling off. The official assured that although recreating a kohbar ghar would be difficult, a new one would be created, possibly by Shanti Devi, a member of Ganga Devi’s family. The destruction has been heavily criticized as a case of indifference towards traditional arts.

== Early life ==
When Ganga Devi was still a child, she was handed her first brush by her mother, which was made of rice straw and a few threads drawn from the hem of her sari. Ganga Devi took soot scraped from the bottom of a cooking pot, or from the chimney of a hurricane lantern and used it as ink. It was a common practice to mix the soot with cattle urine, gum arabic dissolved in water, or sometimes even goat's milk. She learnt this from her cousin sisters and aunts, their mothers and grandmothers. Due to lack of paper in the village, she used to practice on a canvas made from the pages of her school notebook that were often glued onto cloth.

== Career ==
Ganga Devi got selected for the "Festival of India in US". She represented Indian art form in Russia and Japan. She narrated all her experiences through paintings, after which she was honored with the a National Award for Crafts by the Indian Government.

When Ganga Devi was detected with cancer, in the 1980s, she could not go back to Mithila as she was prescribed regular Chemotherapy.

== Notable Work ==
=== Ramayana Paintings ===
She created a series of paintings depicting the famous Indian epic, the Ramayana, employing a palette of subtle colors.

=== Manav Jivan (Life of Mankind) series ===
In this series, she painted the detailed lifecycle of a rural woman.

=== Artwork inspired from USA ===
When Ganga Devi traveled to the US, she translated her experiences into paintings. It was a series of her observations.

== Personal life ==
Ganga Devi's married life was tormented. She was abandoned by her husband, as she could not conceive a child. He married another woman, to whom she lost everything. However, her life changed when she was commissioned by a French art collector to create several paintings, a collaboration that marked the beginning of a significant expansion in her career.

== See also ==
- Madhubani painting
