= Baua Devi =

Bihar artist

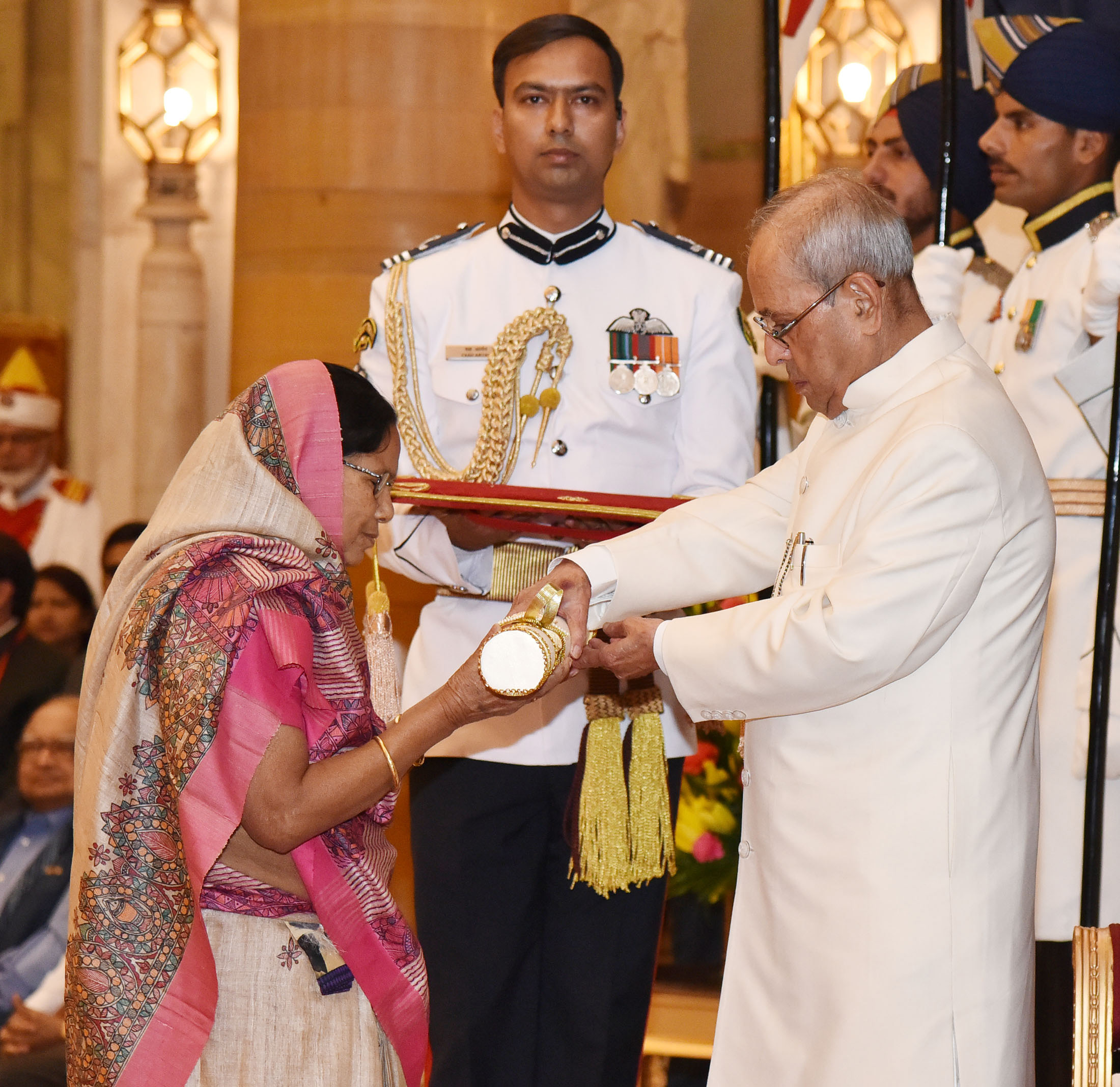
- Born: Jitwarpur, Madhubani district, Bihar
- Style: Mithila or Madhubani painting
- Awards: Padma Shri (2017), National Award (1984)

Baua Devi is a Mithila painting artist from Jitwarpur village of Madhubani District in Bihar. She is a recipient of the National Award, which she won in 1984, and was honored with the Padma Shri in 2017 for her contributions

== Early life ==
Devi got married at the age of 12, and was encouraged by her mother-in-law to pursue painting.

== Work ==
Mithila painting is an ancient folk art that originated in the region. It is recognized as a series of complex geometric and linear patterns traced on the walls of a house's inner chambers. It was later transferred to handmade paper and canvases. Baua Devi has been practising the Mithila art form for almost 60 years. In 1966, Pupul Jayakar, then director of the All India Handicrafts Board, an advisory body of the Ministry of textiles, sent Mumbai artist Bhaskar Kulkarni to Madhubani to find art and artists. Baua Devi was a teenager when she met Kulkarni and was the youngest of the group of artists who formally transferred Mithila art from walls, where it was traditionally practised as mural art, to paper. Bhaskar Kulkarni took their works to museums and later encouraged Baua Devi to come to the National Crafts Museum. She was paid Rs.1.50 per painting for the first year that she worked for Kulkarni. Her work has since travelled to galleries and museums in Spain, France and Japan. In 2015, one of her paintings was gifted by Prime Minister Narendra Modi to the Mayor of Hanover, Stefan Schosstok on his visit to India.

== Style ==
Over the past five decades, Madhubani art has grown in prominence and Baua Devi's work has won critical acclaim She was the only woman artist from India to show at the Magiciens de la Terre in 1989 at the Centre Pompidou. Her work ranges in scale from a small sheet of paper to murals up to 20 feet high. Her paintings tell the mythological stories of Lord Krishna and Ram and Sita, while emphasising on Sita's narrative of the story. Baua Devi uses handmade paper and natural colours for her paintings, predominantly using black, yellow, red and white in her palette.

== Awards ==
Baua Devi won the National Award in 1984 and received the Padma Shri in 2017.

- Padma Shri, 2017
- National Award, 1984
