= Laheriasarai =

Town in India

Laheriasarai लहेरियासराय
- Town
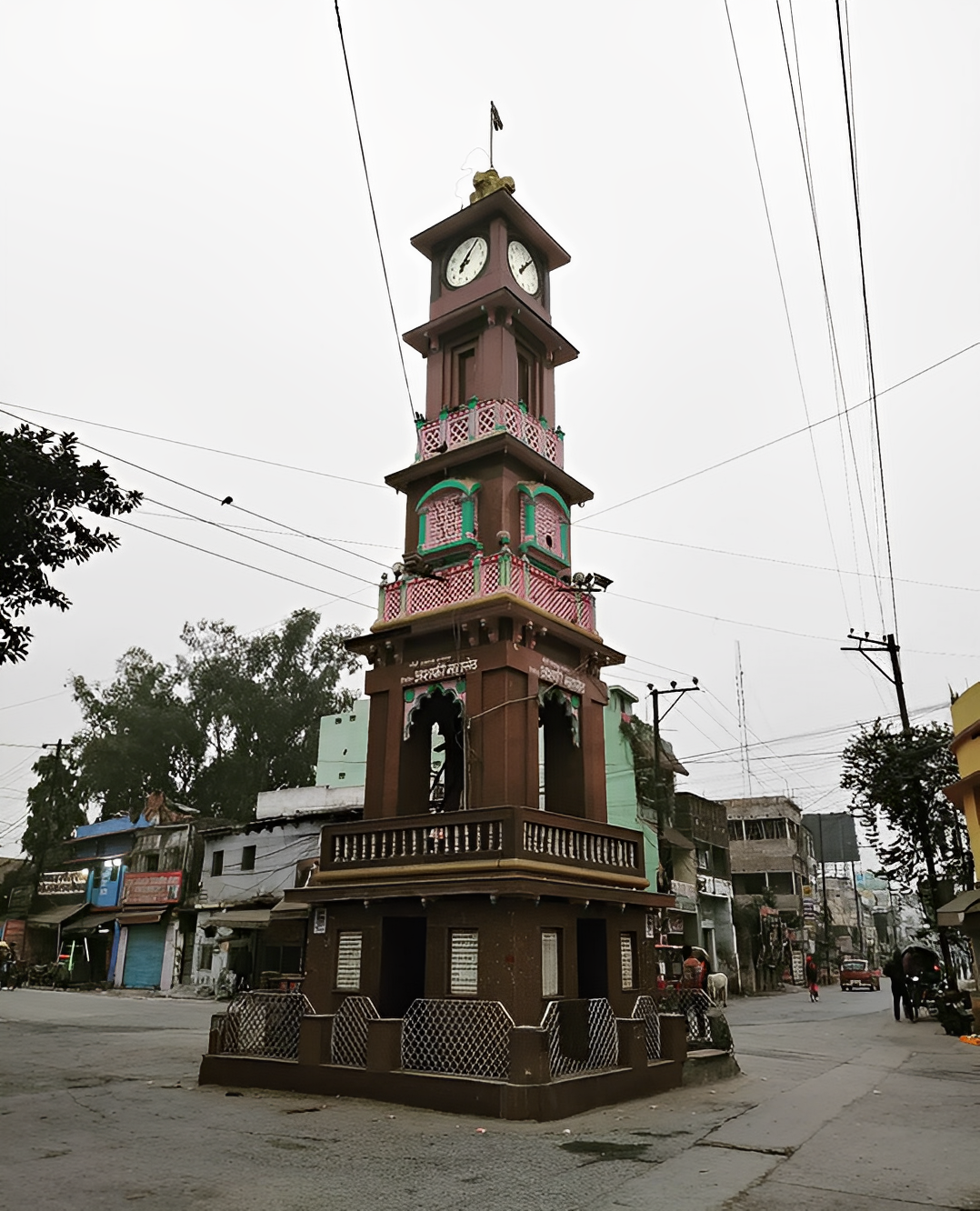
- Laheriasarai Tower Chowk

- Location in Bihar
- Coordinates: 26.119178°N 85.904715°E
- Country: India
- State: Bihar
- District: Darbhanga district

Area
  - Total: 14.52 km^{2} (5.61 sq mi)
- Elevation: 54 m (177 ft)

Population (2011)
  - Total: 41,591
  - Density: 2,864/km^{2} (7,420/sq mi)

Languages
  - Spoken: Maithili, Urdu, Hindi
- Time zone: IST (UTC+5:30)
- PIN: 846001

Survey map and Satellite picture of Laheriasarai

Laheriasarai is a town and serves as the administrative center for the Darbhanga district and division. It is situated within the urban expanse of Darbhanga. It is very close to Darbhanga city and is sometimes considered its twin city. It has a population of about 41,591. The male and female populations are 21993 and 19598 respectively. The size of the area is about 14.52 square kilometer.

== Origin ==
The town "Laheriasarai'' is named after the Laheri community who are known for its long-standing tradition of Lahthi-making. Even today, 50 households from this community continue to reside here.

== Connectivity ==
=== By Rail ===
Laheriasarai railway station is well connected to Delhi, Kolkata, Mumbai, Chennai, Hyderabad, Pune, Bengaluru, Amritsar, Ahmedabad, Patna and almost other major cities.

=== By Road ===
Frequent buses is available from the main roadways bus stand to all major cities. However to move to internal part of Darbhanga district.

=== By Air ===
Darbhanga Airport is the nearest airport to Laheriasarai and almost 7 km away from Laheriasarai railway station. Air services is presently available for Delhi, Mumbai, Bengaluru, Ahmadabad, Hyderabad, Kolkata and Pune.

== Educational institutions ==
- Jesus & Mary Academy Darbhanga
- Manas International School
- New Era Public School, Darbhanga
- Rose Public School

== See also ==
- Darbhanga district
- Laheriasarai railway station
- Darbhanga
