= Tokio Hasegawa =

Japanese musical artist cum patron of Mithila arts

- Citizenship: Japanese
- Occupations: Musical artist and Mithila art curator

Tokio Hasegawa is a Japanese musical artist cum patron of the Madhubani art or Mithila painting. He is the founder cum present director of the Mithila Museum in Japan. He is a great lover of the Mithila arts and paintings made by the Maithil community in the Indian subcontinent. In music, he is also known for Stone Music performance.
