= Ranti =

Cultural village in Madhubani district

- Village
- Ranti
- Interactive map of Ranti

Population (2011)
  - Total: 9,647
- Demonym: Maithil

Languages
  - Official: Hindi
  - Number of households: 1937

Regional languages
  - Mother tongue Ancient: Maithili; Sanskrit

Ranti is a historical village in the Mithila region of the Indian subcontinent. It is located in the Rajnagar block of the Madhubani district in the state of Bihar in India. It is famous as a hub for the traditional Madhubani paintings and arts in the region. The village has produced three Padma Shri awardee for the art. The village of Ranti lies at the outskirts of the Madhubani city.

== Demographics ==
According to the population census 2011 of India, the total population of the village is 9647. The total number of households in the village is 1937.
