= Madhubani, India =

District in Bihar, India

Madhubani Mithila
- District
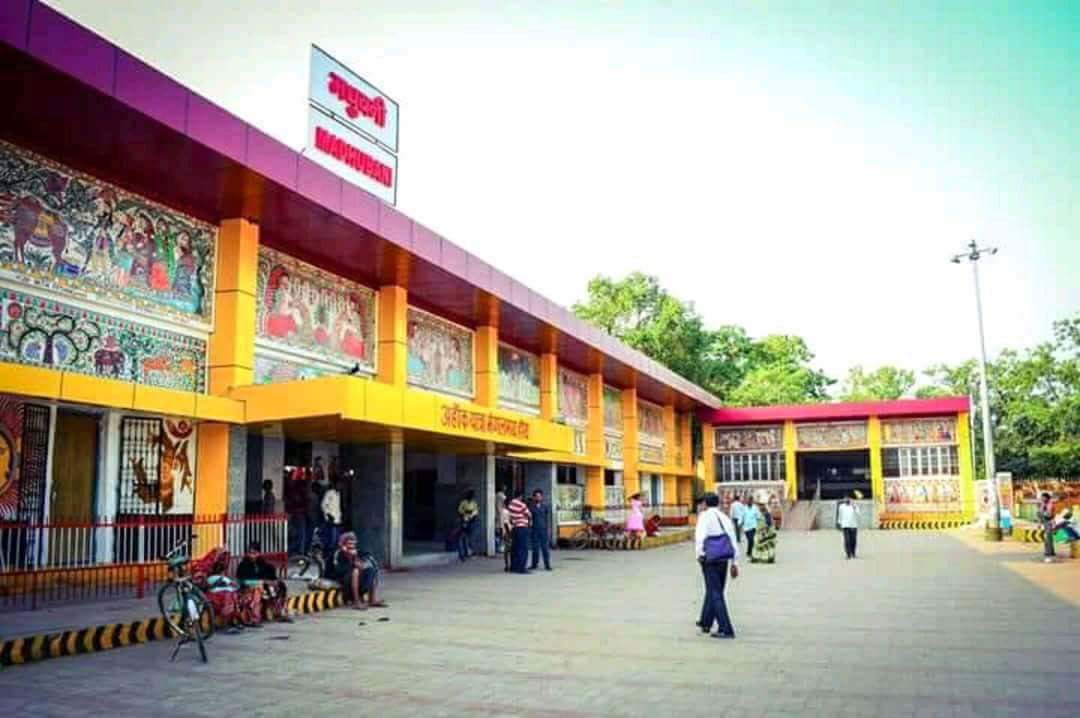
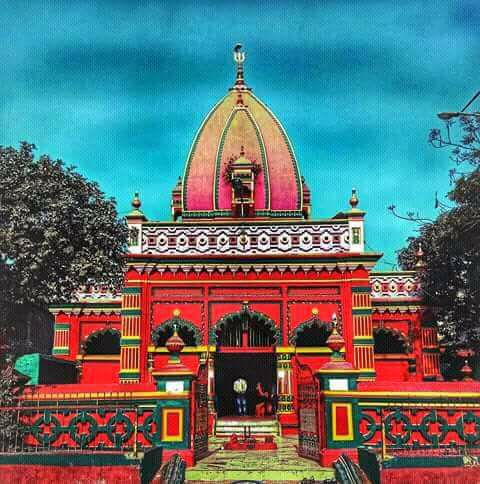
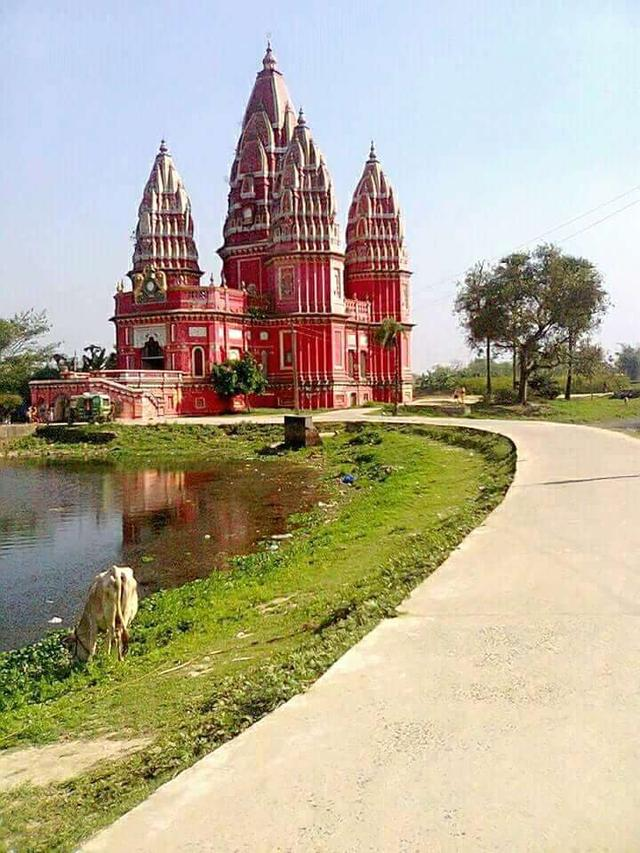
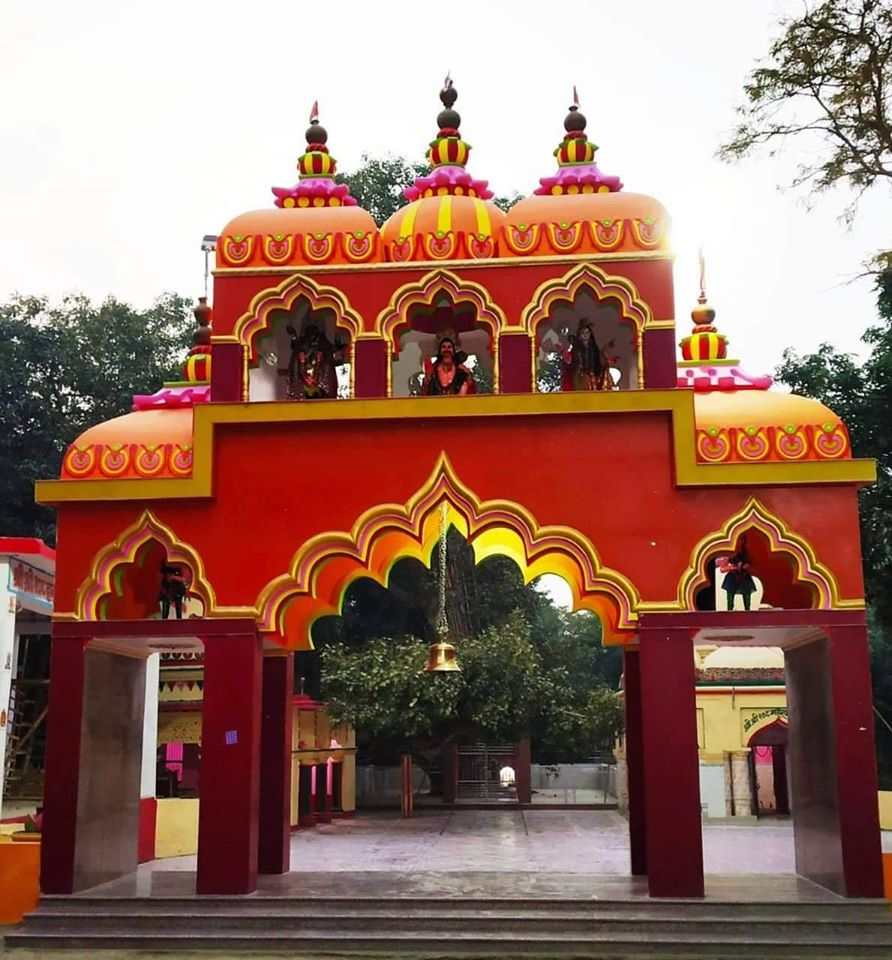
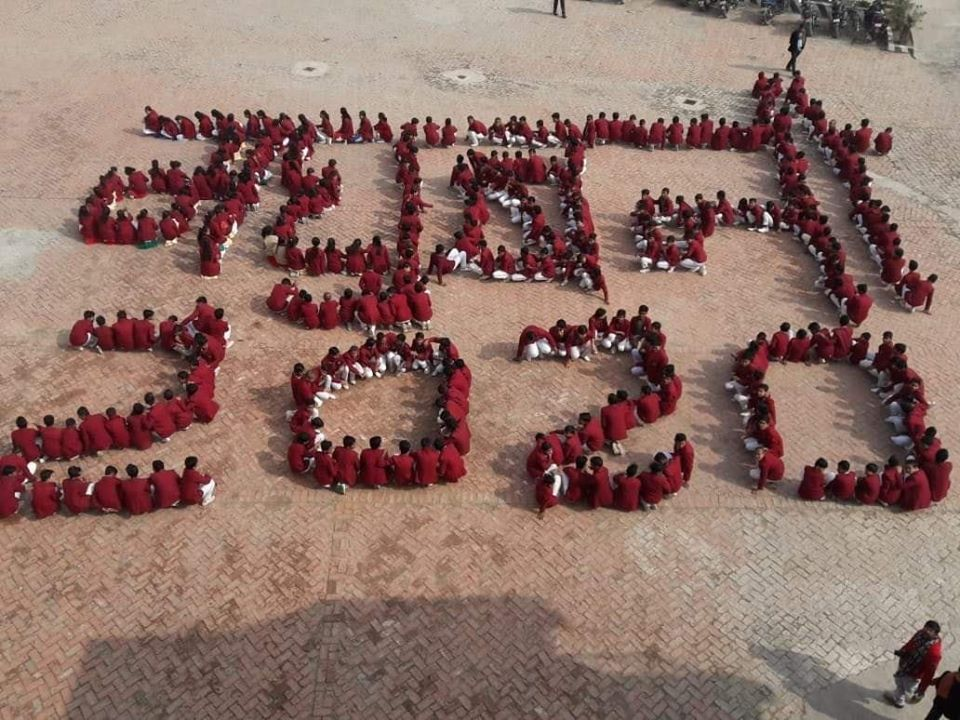
- Clockwise from top: Madhubani City skyline, Madhubani railway station, Kali Mandir, Police Line mandir, Hanuman Mandir, School Student.
- Nickname: Art City of Mithila
- Location in Bihar, India Madhubani (India)
- Coordinates: 26°21′07″N 86°04′19″E
- Country: India
- State: Bihar
- Region: Mithila (region)
- District: Madhubani
- Founder: Unknown

Government
  - Type: Municipal Corporation
  - Body: Madhubani Municipal Corporation

Area
  - Total: 46.56 km^{2} (17.98 sq mi)
- Elevation: 56 m (184 ft)

Population (2011)
  - Total: 164,156
  - Density: 3,526/km^{2} (9,131/sq mi)
- Demonym: Maithil

Languages
  - Official: Hindi
  - Additional official: Maithili
  - Regional Language: Maithili
- Time zone: UTC+5:30 (IST)
- PIN: 847211 (Madhubani)
- Telephone code: 06276
- ISO 3166 code: IN-BR
- Vehicle registration: BR-32
- Sex ratio: 1000/926 ♂/♀
- Lok Sabha constituency: Madhubani
- Vidhan Sabha constituency: Madhubani, Bisfi
- Website: madhubani.nic.in

Madhubani is a city in the Mithila region of Bihar in India. It is regulated by the Madhubani Municipal Corporation. It is the headquarter of the Madhubani district. It is part of Darbhanga Division, in the Indian state of Bihar. It is situated at 26 km northeast of Darbhanga City. The Madhuban Raj in Madhubani was created as a consequence. The word "Madhuban" means "forest of honey", from which Madhubani is derived, but sometimes it is also known as "madhu"+"vaani" meaning "sweet" "voice/language".

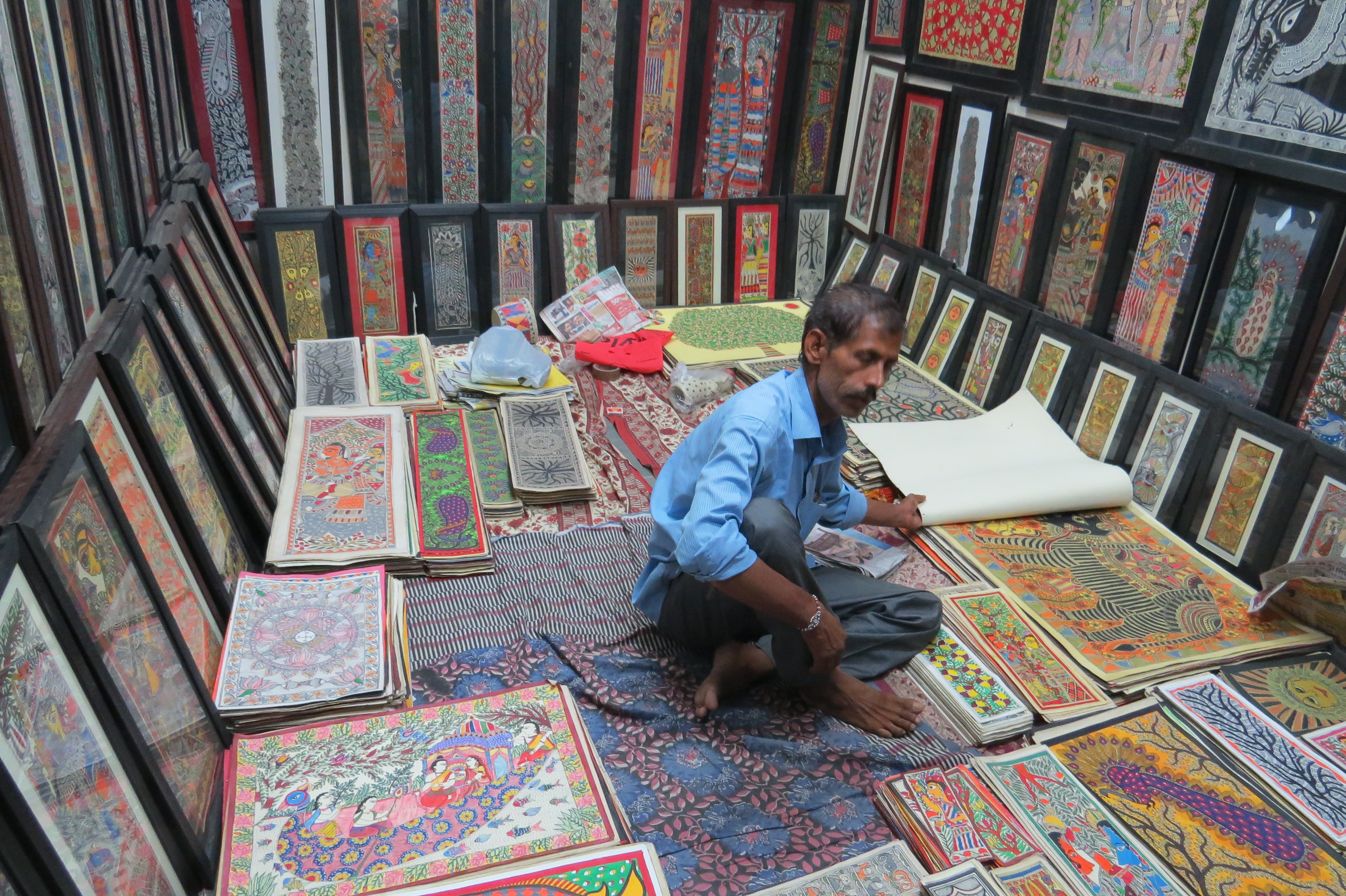
Iconic traditional Madhubani art being sold in the store, Madhubani

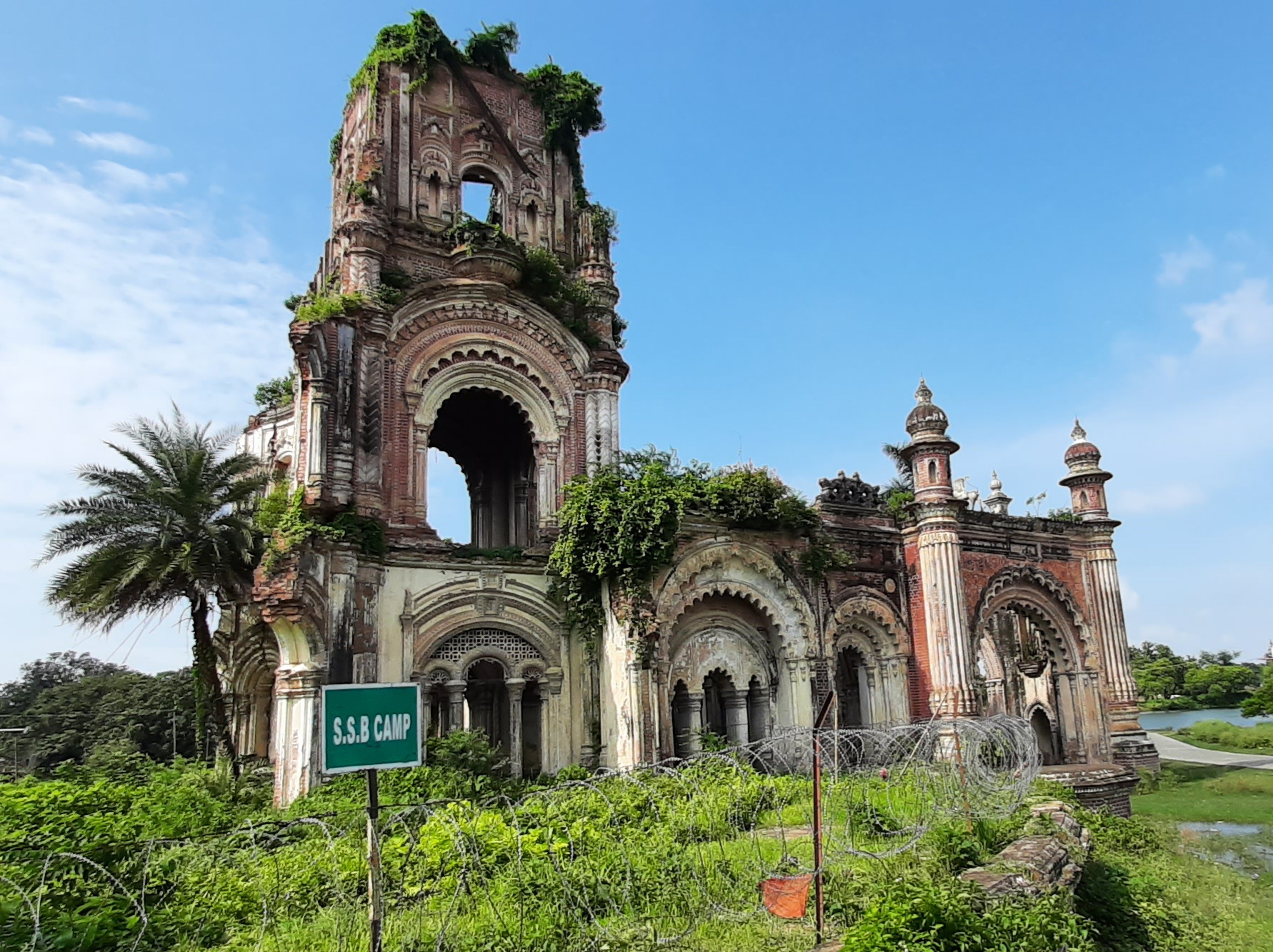
Ruins of Rajnagar palace, Madhubani

== History ==
Madhubani is a major historical city in the region of Mithila in the Indian subcontinent. During the Khandawala Dynasty, it was the capital of Mithila. At the outskirts of the present city of Madhubani, there is a historical ruins of the royal palace of the mediaeval period Kingdom of Mithila. The royal palace is called Raj Nagar which translates to royal city. It is also known as Navlakha palace. It was built by the then Maharaja Rameshwar Singh of the Raj Darbhanga in Mithila.

== Geography ==
Madhubani is situated about 35 km from the Nepal Border, 26 km from Darbhanga, 180 km from Patna and 100 km from Saharsa.

Madhubani Town is located at 26.37°N 86.08°E. It has an average elevation of 56 metres.

== Demographics ==
As of 2011 India census, Madhubani Town had a population of 166,285. Males constitute 53% of the population and females 47%. Madhubani Town has an average literacy rate of 58.62, against the national average of 62.39%: male literacy is 70.14%, and female literacy is 46.16%. In Madhubani Town, 16% of the population is under 6 years of age.

== Urban Haat ==
The first urban haat of Bihar have built in Araria Sangram of Madhubani district, which is known as Mithilahaat, which is a park in Madhubhani, made by the Bihar State Tourism Development Corporation (BSTDC) and inaugurated by Bihar Chief Minister Nitish Kumar on January 11, 2023.

== Trade ==
Laukaha is a nearby town close to the border of Nepalese town of Thadi. Laukaha in India and Thadi in Nepal are a part of one of the agreed route for Mutual Trade between India and Nepal and import and export to Nepal happen via Laukaha. Government of Nepal has set up a dedicated customs office in the town. and Government of India has set up a Land Customs Station with a Superintendent level officer.

== Education ==
- Ram Krishna College
- Madhubani Medical College and Hospital
- Jagdish Nandan College
- Watson High School, Madhubani
- Sandip University, Sijoul
- Mithila Chitrakala Sansthan

== Notable people ==
- Nischalananda Saraswati , 145th Shankaracharya of the Govardhana Peetha at Puri.
- Bhogendra Jha
- Arknath Chaudhary
- Chandramani Datta
- Mahasundari Devi
- Sita Devi
- Ashish Jha
- Ganganath Jha
- Narendra Jha
- Sanjay Kumar Jha
- Yogeshwar Jha
- Sriram Jha
- Mangani Lal Mandal
- Ramprit Mandal
- Ram Prit Paswan
- Chaturanan Mishra
- Lalit Narayan Mishra
- Mohan Mishra
- Prem Chandra Mishra
- Maṇḍana Miśra
- Amrish Ranjan Pandey
- Mohammad Shams Aalam Shaikh
- Gajendra Thakur
- Vidyapati, Maithili poet
- Devendra Prasad Yadav
- Hukmdev Narayan Yadav
- Ashok Kumar Yadav
- Maithili Thakur
