= Kapila (name) =

Kapila is a given name and a surname. Notable people with the name include:

== Given name ==
- Kapila (7th-6th-century BCE), Vedic sage in Hindu tradition
- Kapila Abhayawansa, Sri Lankan academic
- Kapila Chandrasena (1964–2026), Sri Lankan airline and telecommunications executive
- Kapila Gunasekara, Sri Lankan academic
- Kapila Hingorani (1927–2013), Indian lawyer
- Kapila Jayampathy, Sri Lanka air force officer, 16th commander of the Sri Lanka Air Force
- Kapila Jayasekera, Sri Lankan civil service official and politician
- Kapila Samaraweera, Sri Lankan naval officer
- Kapila Vatsyayan (1928–2020), Indian scholar, bureaucrat and politician
- Kapila Venu (born 1982), Indian artist
- Kapila Wanigasooriya, Sri Lankan air force officer
- Kapila Wijegunawardene (born 1964), Sri Lankan cricketer

== Surname ==
- Achhroo Ram Kapila (1926–2003), Indian-born Kenyan lawyer
- Dhruv Kapila (born 2000), Indian badminton player
- Kusha Kapila, Indian social media personality
- Leela Kapila, British Indian paediatric surgeon
- Madhur Kapila (1942–2021), Indian novelist, journalist, art critic and a reviewer of Hindi literature
- Mukesh Kapila (born 1955), Indian author, medical doctor, professor and humanitarian
- Oumi Kapila (born 1984), British-born Australian musician
- Sunil Kapila (born 1958), Kenyan orthodontist and dental academic
- Yvonne Hernandez-Kapila, American periodontist and cell and molecular biologist

== See also ==
- Kapil (name)
- Kapila (disambiguation)
