= Kapila (disambiguation) =

Kapila (7th–6th-century BCE), also referred to as Cakradhanus, was a Vedic sage in Hindu tradition, regarded the founder of the Samkhya school of Hindu philosophy.

Kapila may also refer to:

== Literature ==
- Kapila Purana, an 11th century CE Hindu religious text and one of the 18 Upapuranas

== People ==
- Kapila (name), a list of people with the name

== Places ==
- Kabini river, also known as Kapila, a river in Kerala, India and a tributary of river Kaveri
- Kapila Ashram, a Hindu monastery of the Vedic sage Kapila in Madhubani district, Mithila region, Bihar, India
- Kapila River (Maharashtra), a river in Maharashtra, India and a minor tributary of the river Godavari
- Kapila Theertham, a Hindu temple in Tirupati, Andhra Pradesh, India

== See also ==
- Kapil (name)
- Kapilavastu (disambiguation)
