= Gangasagar Mela =

Hindu pilgrimage and festival celebrated in India

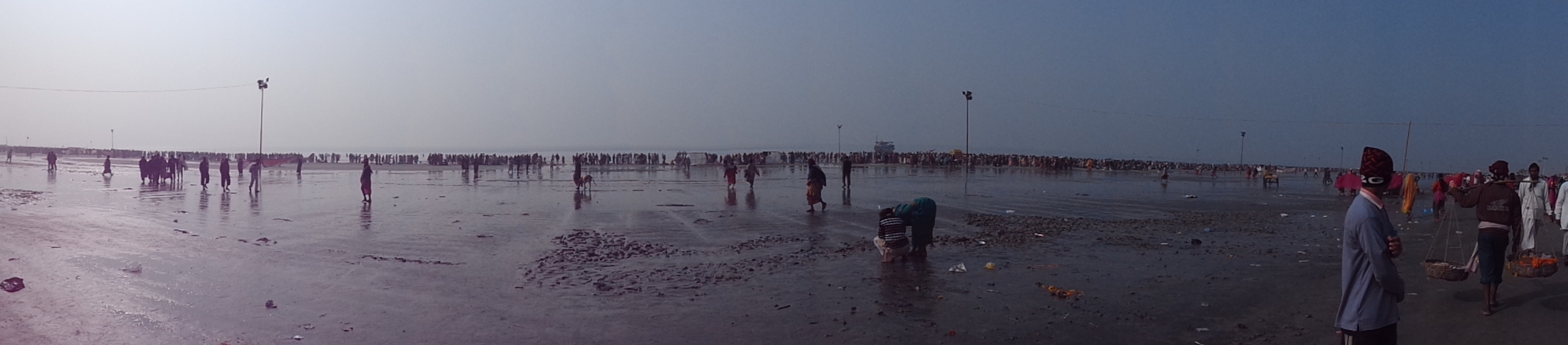
- Status: active
- Genre: Fair, Religious gathering
- Frequency: Every year
- Venue: Confluence of the Ganges and the Bay of Bengal
- Locations: Gangasagar, West Bengal
- Coordinates: 21.6367562°N 88.0554125°E
- Country: India
- Previous event: 2025
- Next event: 2026
- Participants: Pilgrims
- Sponsor: Government of West Bengal
- Website: gangasagar.in

Gangasagar Mela (Bengali: গঙ্গাসাগর মেলা) is a mela and festival in Hinduism, held every year at Gangasagar, West Bengal, India. The confluence of the Ganges and the Bay of Bengal is called the Gangasagar, the fair is held every year on Makar Sankranti at Kapilmuni's ashram located on the Gangasagar. The mela is celebrated on 14 or 15 January every year.

Gangasagar Mela is the second largest Hindu fair (after Kumbh Mela). Many people from different states of India come here every year to take a holy bath on Makar Sankranti day.

In 2024, Renowned Bengali Newspaper Aajkaal Quoted about 1.10 crore devotees gathered in the mela.

== History ==
=== Hindu scriptures ===
The Gangasagar is mentioned in the Mahabharata's Vana Parva, which provides proof of the existence of the pilgrimage site in 1500–2000 BC. According to the Mahabharata, the Pandavas traveled from the banks of the river Kaushik and reached the Gangesagarasangam, Confluence of Ganges and Sagara (Sea). According to Hinduism, the "Gangasagarasangam" mentioned in the Mahabharata is Gangasagar in Sagardwip, situated at the estuary of the Bhagirathi-Hooghly rivers – one of the two main branches of the Ganges– on the sea coast of West Bengal.

Legend has it that Kapilmuni, the progenitor of Samkhya philosophy, had an ashram at Gangasagara. Sixty thousand sons of Sagara King were consumed by Kapilmuni's wrath and their Ātmans (souls) were thrown into Naraka (hell). Bhagiratha, the grandson of the Sagara king, brought the Ganga from Svarga (heaven) to wash the remains of the Sagara's sons and free their Ātmans (souls).

=== Ancient times ===
The Gangasagar pilgrimage is also mentioned in Raghuvaṃśa, a Sanskrit epic poem written by the great poet Kalidasa in the fifth century AD. There is disagreement over the exact age of Kapil Muni's ashram. The temple of Kapil Muni is mentioned in the 16th century ancient Puthi Tirthaattvapradayini (Bengali: তীর্থতত্ত্বপ্রদায়িনী). An article about the Gangasagar Mela was printed on February 4, 1837, in the once popular Bengali newspaper Harkara (Bengali: হরকরা). It is written, "The one temple in this place (Sagar Dwip) has been known to people for 1400 years. In this temple there is established a Siddhapurusha named Kapil Muni.

Also, King Devapala of the Pala dynasty mentions in an inscription that he performed rituals at the confluence of the Gangasagar.

=== Middle Ages ===
During medieval times, pilgrims from every corner of the subcontinent defied many obstacles and dangers to reach Gangasagar on Makar Sankranti, namely attacks from the Bengal tiger inhabiting the mangrove forests, presence of the gharial in the waters & piracy activities of the Mog sponsored by the kingdom of Arakan & later the Portuguese. Enroute along the riverine course of the Adi Ganga was the small hamlet of Mograhat, named so because of the presence of a slave market operated by the Mog people, where captured Hindu pilgrims would be sold. During the perilous journey, the pilgrims faced diseases like cholera and small pox. Due to the danger and death faced by the pilgrims the Bengali phrase originated — saba tīrtha bāra bāra, gaṅgāsāgara ēkabāra ("Go to all tirthas again & again, but Gangasagar only once in life").

=== Modern era ===
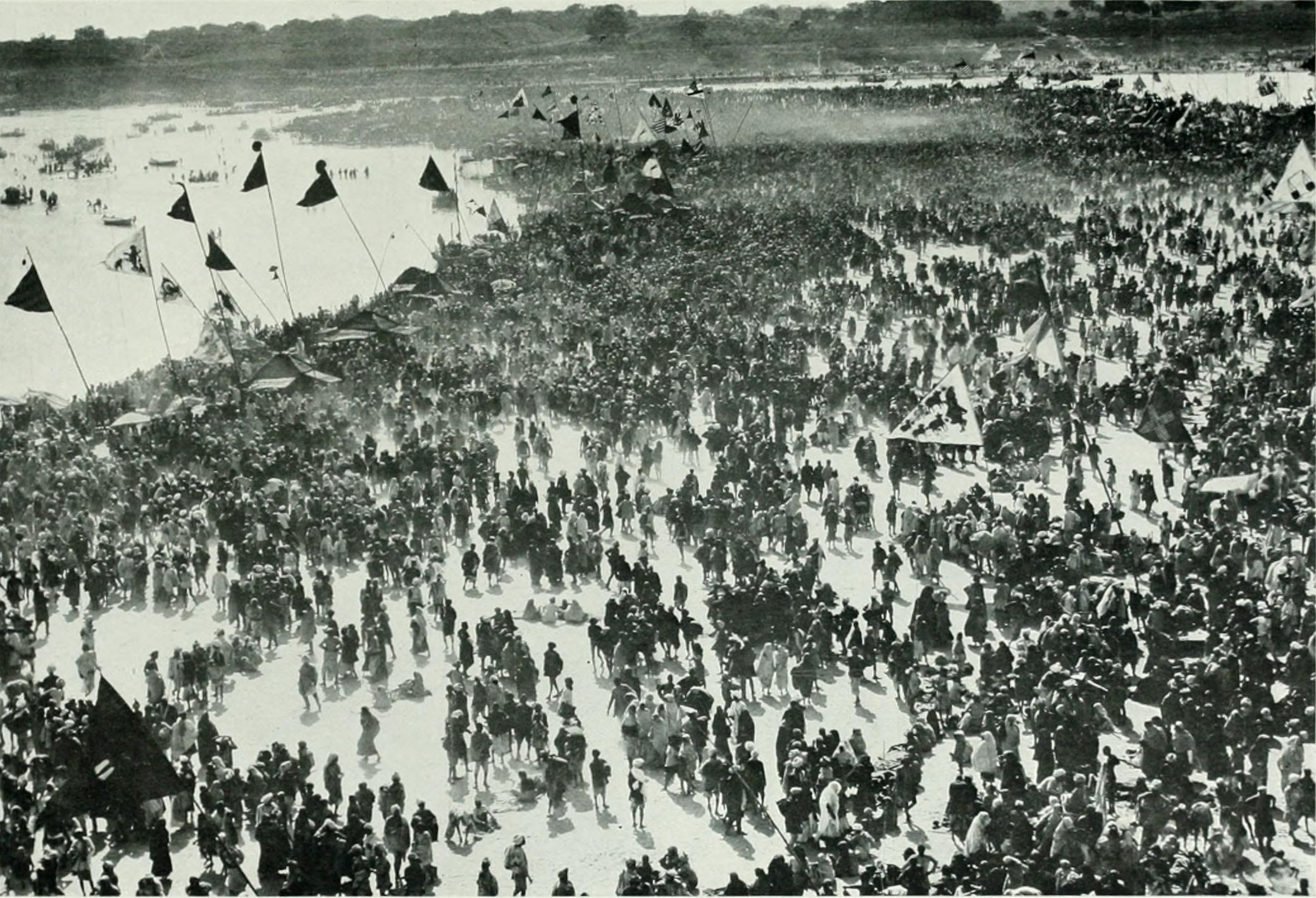
A photo (c. 1909) by Ada Lee. It shows a Hindu pilgrim gathering at Gangasagar Mela, Ganga Sagar, West Bengal – where river Ganges meets the Bay of Bengal.

In the year 1819, Warren Hastings cleared the northern parts of the island in order to resettle 500 Rohingya families fleeing persecution following the Konbaung dynasty's conquest of Arakan, who would cultivate crops in the cleared land. Shortly after this, the shrine of Kapilmuni situated at the south end of the island came under possession of Ramanandi sadhus from Ayodhya with the help of a local zamindar. Kapalkundala, a Bengali novel written by Bankim Chandra Chattopadhyay, depicts a perilous journey to reach the Gangasagar. In 1891, the festivities became the a hotspot for the 5th cholera pandemic. In 1914 AD, a man named Wilson mentions the temple of Kapilmuni in the District Gazetteer. According to the person's writings, Kapilmuni's temple was temporary structure surrounded by a bamboo fence. In front of the temple was a huge banyan tree, under which were murtis (idols) of Rama and Hanuman. Gangasagar Mela is mentioned in the Bhāratēra Tīrthayātrā (in en: India's Pilgrimage) by Shri Madhavachandra Varman published in 1336 Baṅgābda. This text mentions "three days of bathing in the Gangasagar during Makara Sankranti in Poush or Magh month, the fair lasts for five days".

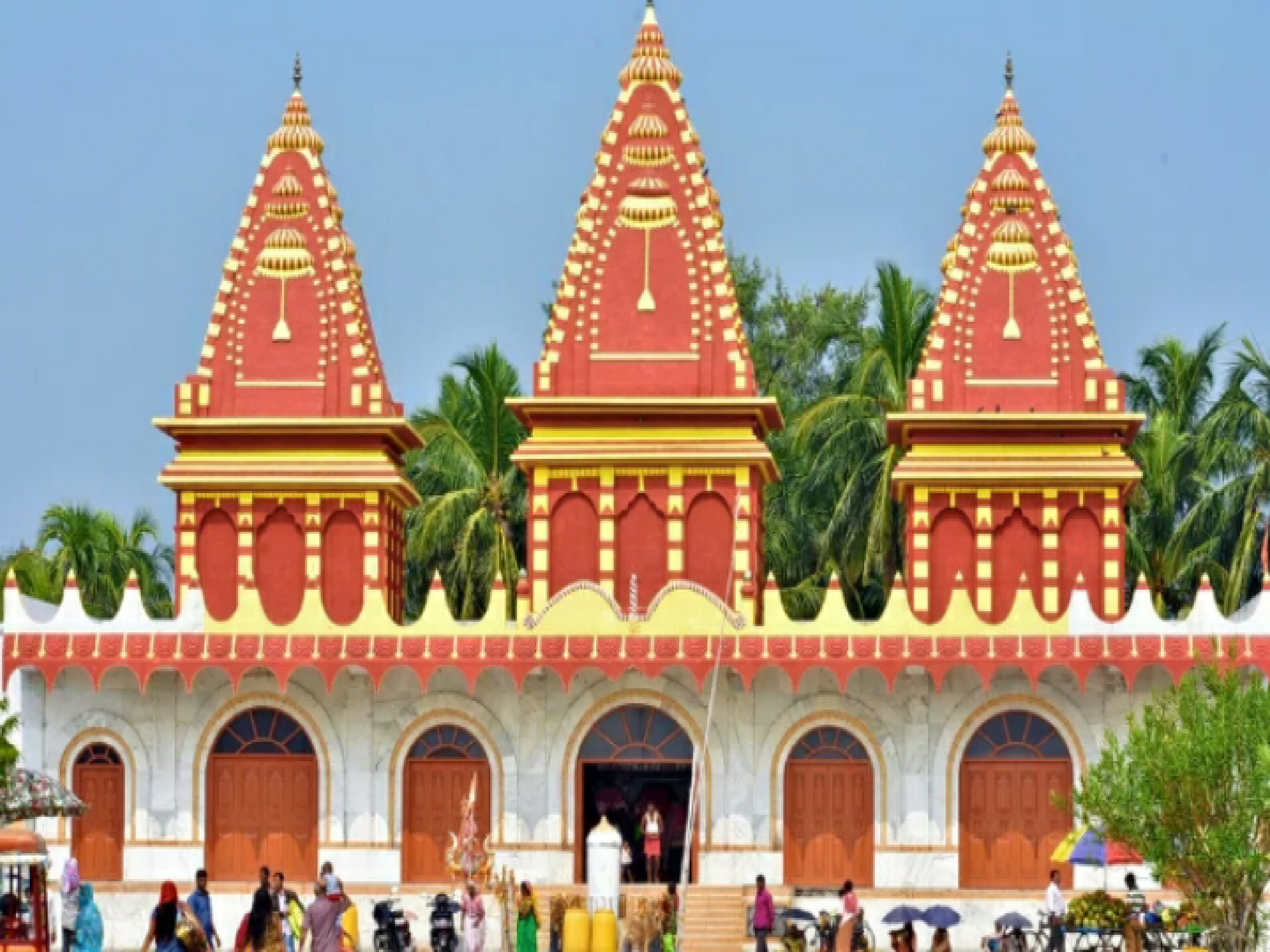
Kapil Muni Temple, its construction was completed in 1974.

After India's independence, the pilgrimage site began to flourish. Pictures of the temple were published in the Bengali book Gangasagar Mela O Pracina Aitihya by Tarundev Bhattacharya. According to the text, the permanent temple emerged in the form of a mature temple between 1964 and 1974. The West Bengal Government assisted in the construction of a permanent temple in the 1970s. In the following decades, the number of pilgrims to the fair increased. At present, millions of people congregate every year on the auspicious day of Makara Sankranti or Poush-Sankranti (mid-January) in the month of Poush to celebrate the Gangasagar fair and the pilgrimage site.

=== Pilgrims ===
In 2007, about 300,000 pilgrims took the holy dip where the Ganges (Hooghly) meets the Bay of Bengal on the occasion of Makar Sankranti. Almost five-hundred thousand pilgrims thronged Gangasagar in 2008. For the rest of the year about 500,000 people come to the island. According to reports on 14 January 2018, 1.8-2 million people had visited Gangasagar in 2018, against 1.5 million in 2017. In 2023, about 51 lakhs pilgrims gathered in the Gangasagar Mela.

== Dates, location and preparation ==
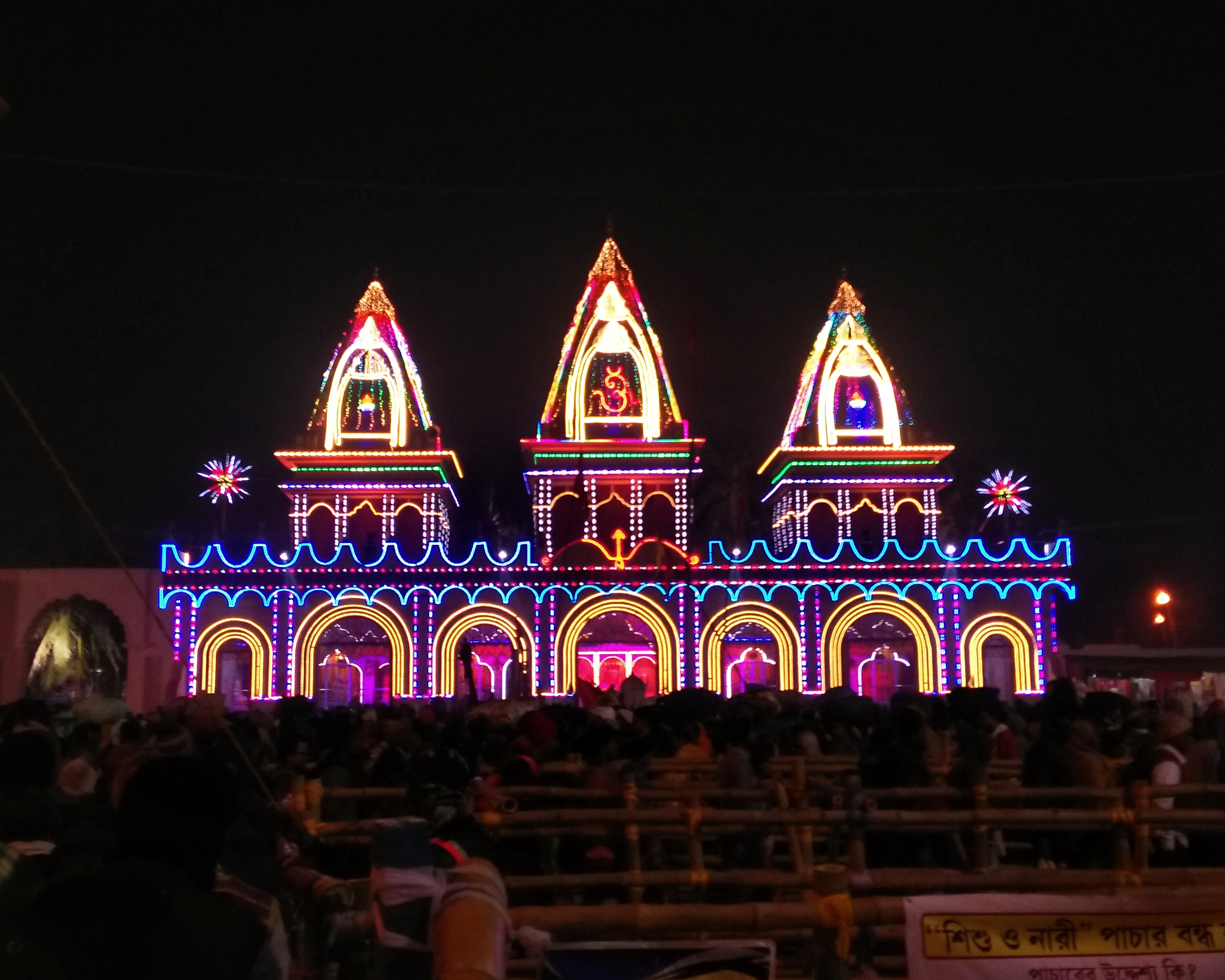
Kapil Muni Temple during the Gangasagar Mela in 2019.

=== Dates ===
The Gangasagar Mela is organized on the occasion of the holy dip on Makar Sankranti, usually on January 14 or 15. Makar Sankranti is set by the solar cycle and corresponds to the exact time astronomical event of the Sun entering Capricorn and is observed on a day that usually falls on 14 January of the Gregorian calendar, but on 15 January in leap years. Makar Sankranti's date and time is analogous to Sidereal time of Zodiac sign of Capricorn (when sun enters).

In 2023, holy dip started on January 14, 6:30 PM and ended on January 15, 6:53 PM.

=== Location ===
Gangasagar Mela is held at Gangasagar, Sagar Dwip. The place belongs to South 24 Parganas district, West Bengal. The Mela is organized around Kapil Muni's ashram. The site of the Mela is on the banks of the confluence of the Ganges and the Bay of Bengal.

=== Preparation for the fair ===
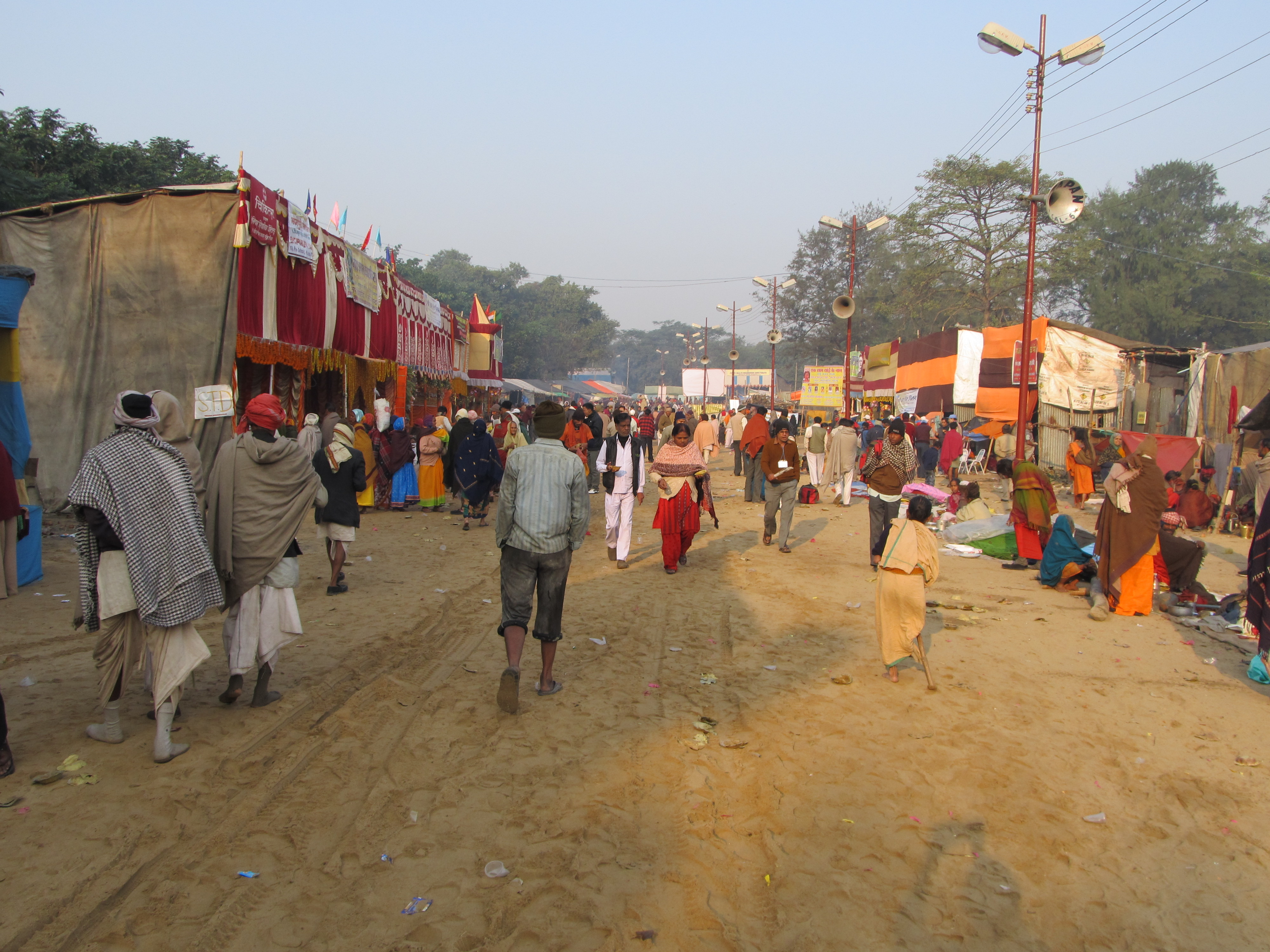
In 2012, a view of the temporary transit camp constructed in Kolkata.

Pilgrims from different states of India arrive on the occasion of Ganga bath and the Gangasagar Mela. Most of the pilgrims first arrive at Kolkata to visit Gangasagar. Transit camps are established in Kolkata every year for the convenience of pilgrims. All kinds of civic facilities are provided to these camps.

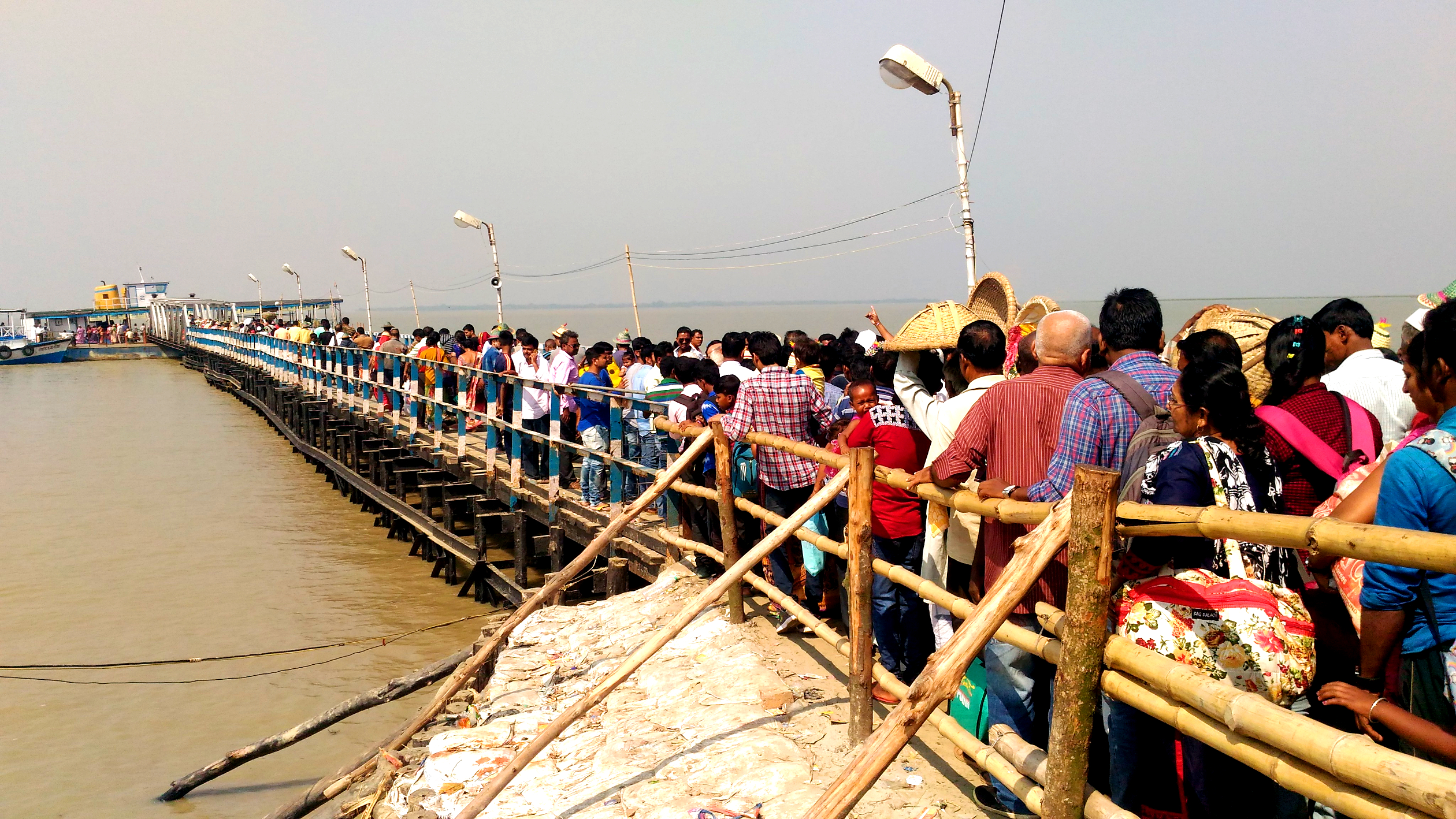
A temporary jetty built on the occasion of the fair, and a crowd of pilgrims.

The biggest obstacle to reaching Sagar Dwip is the Muri Ganga River; Pilgrims have to cross this river on their journey. However, due to the low navigability of the river, it is not possible to cross the river without tide. Every year, dredging is carried out in the river for uninterrupted ferry operation. Ferry services are operated between Kakdwip and Kachuberia, Sagar Dwip on the occasion of fairs and Ganga bath. Several temporary jetties were constructed for faster and more pilgrim transport. All vessels and buses can be monitored from a central control room. GPS and NAVIC (Navigation with Indian Constellation) technology is used in all the transport vehicles of Sagar Dwip for surveillance. Vessels are also provided with navigation lights to prevent visibility problems due to fog.

== Rituals ==
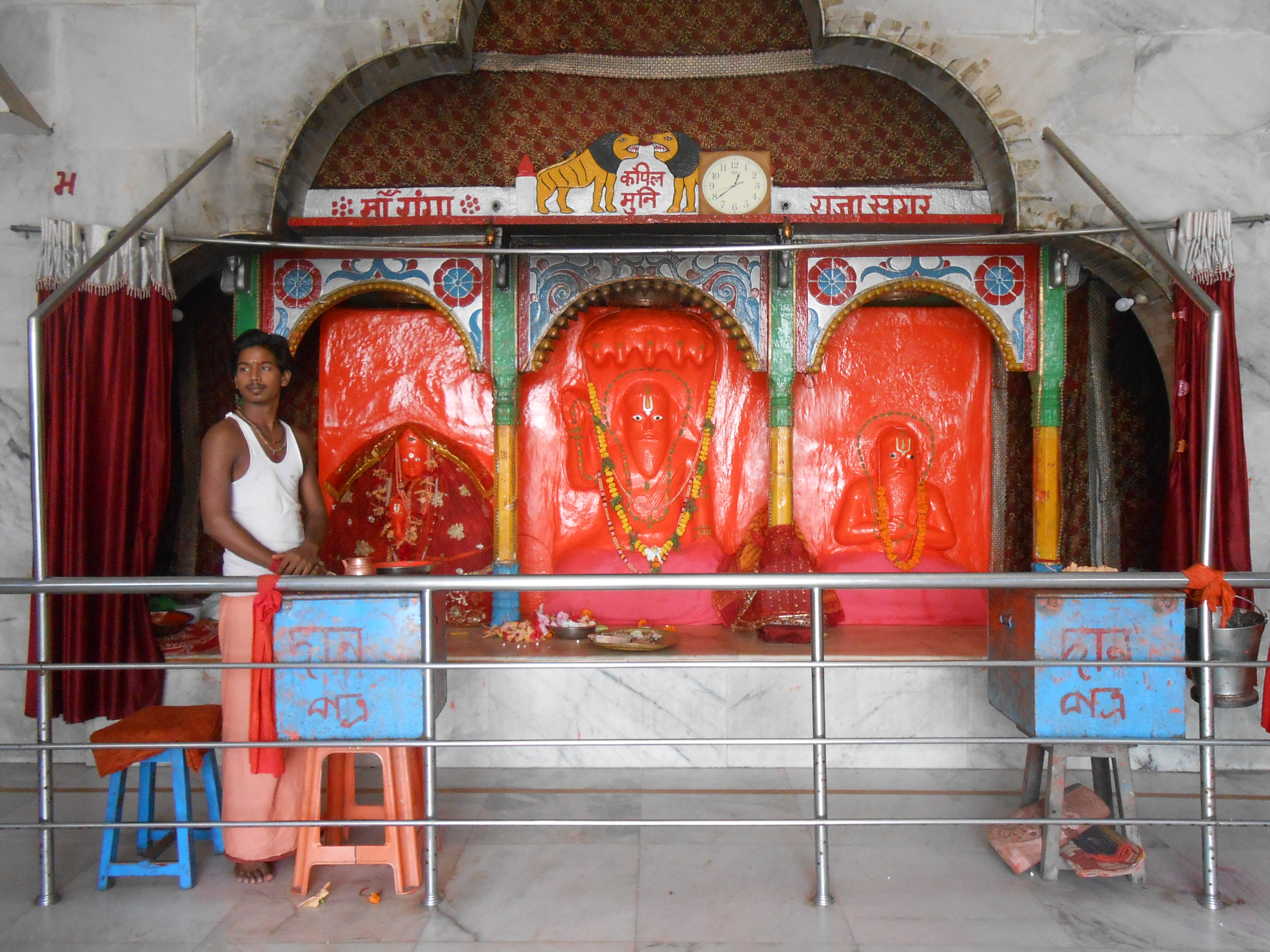
Sculptures of goddess Ganga, Kapilmuni and Sagar Raja in the Kapilmuni Temple.

On the day of Ganga Bathing, Hindu devotees gather early in the morning and take a holy dip in the Ganges River. They offer offerings to Lord Surya and chant Lord Surya Mantra.

After completing the rituals, people worship Kapil Muni and light a pradeep (Diya) with desi ghee. Some also perform Yajna and Homa on the day of Ganga bathing. Some devotees even observe a strict fast on Gangasana days. On this auspicious day of Ganga bathing, devotees express their gratitude to Goddess Ganga and seek forgiveness for their misdeeds knowingly or unknowingly.

== Special Certificate ==
The District Administration of South 24 Parganas handed over special certificates to all the pilgrims who came to Gangasagar Mela. Apart from the photo and phone number of the pilgrims, the certificates also contain a greeting message from the state government.

== Bibliography ==
- Basu, Rajshekhar (1954). মহাভারত (in Bengali). Kolkata: MCR Sarkar & Sons. ISBN 81-7157-006-2.
- Ghosh, Binoy (January 2020). পশ্চিমবঙ্গের সংস্কৃতি (in Bengali). Vol. 3rd. Kolkata: Deep Publishing. ISBN 978-93-89584-39-4.
- Ivermee, Robert (2021). Hooghly: The Global History of a River (1st ed.). Noida, Uttar Pradesh, India: HarperCollins. ISBN 978-93-5422-314-3.
