= Kapil =

Kapil is a masculine given name of Indian origin, and a surname. Notable people with the name include:

== Given name ==
- Kapil Dev Agarwal (born 1966), Indian politician
- Kapil Arya, Indian television actor
- Kapil Dev (born 1959), Indian cricketer and captain of the India national cricket team
- K. J. Kapil Dev (fl. 2006–2010), Indian volleyball player
- Kapil Deva Dvivedi, Indian academic
- Kapil Hoble (born 1998), Indian footballer
- Kapil Kak, Indian air force officer
- Kapil Deo Kamat (1951–2020), Indian politician
- Kapil Kapilan (born 1992), Indian playback singer and actor
- Kapil Kapoor (born 1940), Indian scholar of history, linguistics, literature and an authority on Indian intellectual traditions
- Kapil Muni Karwariya (born 1967), Indian politician
- Kapil Singh Lalwani (born 1990), Indian actor
- Kapil Mishra (born 1980), Indian politician
- Kapil Mohan (1929–2018), Indian army officer, entrepreneur and the chairman and managing director of Mohan Meakin
- Kapil Mohan (civil servant) (born 1963), Indian civil servant
- Kapil Nirmal, Indian television actor
- Kapil Hari Paranjape, Indian mathematician
- Kapil Parmar (born 2000), Indian para judo athlete
- Kapil Patil (born 1961), Indian politician
- Kapil Harishchandra Patil, Indian socialist politician, educationist, trade union leader and journalist
- Kapil Dev Prasad, Indian weaver
- Kapil Seth (1979–2016), Indian cricketer
- Kapil Sharma (born 1981), Indian stand-up comedian, television host, actor, dubbing artist, producer and singer
- Kapil Dev Sharma (1920–2006), Indian scientist and technologist
- Kapil Sibal (born 1948), Indian lawyer and politician
- Kapil Srivastava, Indian guitarist, music author, composer and trainer
- Kapil Talwalkar, Indian American actor and musician
- Kapil Krishna Thakur (1940–2014), Indian politician
- Kapil Narayan Tiwari (1929–2022), Indian activist and politician
- Kapil Tiwari, Indian academic and folk philanthropist
- Kapil Muni Tiwary (1932–2021), Indian professor and head of the department of Linguistics and Literature at Patna University
- Kapil Verma (1928–2016), Indian politician
- Kapil Yadav (born 1987), Indian cricketer

== Surname ==
- Aditi Kapil, American playwright and screenwriter
- Aneesh Kapil (born 1993), English cricketer
- Bhanu Kapil (born 1968), British Indian poet and author
- G. Kapil (born 1994), Indian politician
- Monika Kapil Mohta (born 1962), Indian diplomat and the ambassador of India to Switzerland
- Yashraj Kapil (born 1998), Indian singer

== See also ==
- Kapila (name)
- Kapila (disambiguation)
