= Kapileshwar Temple, Bihar =

Hindu temple in India

Kapileshwar Temple is situated in the Rahika region of Madhubani District, Bihar, India. A Shiva Linga was placed at this temple by the sage Kapila. The site is located in the Rahika Vidhan Sabha constituency. This is one of the famous Shiva temples in Madhubani District. A large pond was dug outside the temple with the help of the Raj Darbhanga; from there, people took water for Jalabhishek. It is surrounded by villages like Kharaua, Rampur, and Jagat. In the month of Shrawan, people from different parts of Bihar gather for the Jalabhishek of Shivlinga. The temple has a big boundary, and in the center of it, Lord Shiva temple is situated, whereas there are other temples also inside the boundary of it, like Parvati temple, Hanuman temples, etc. There are many sculptures here that are from history.

Another Temple named Kapileshwar is also located in supaul district's barauri.

== See also ==
- Ancient Mithila University
- Kapil Ashram
- Kapila Theertham
