= Kapila Ashram =

Gurukul of Ancient Mithila University

Kapil Ashram
- कपिल आश्रम
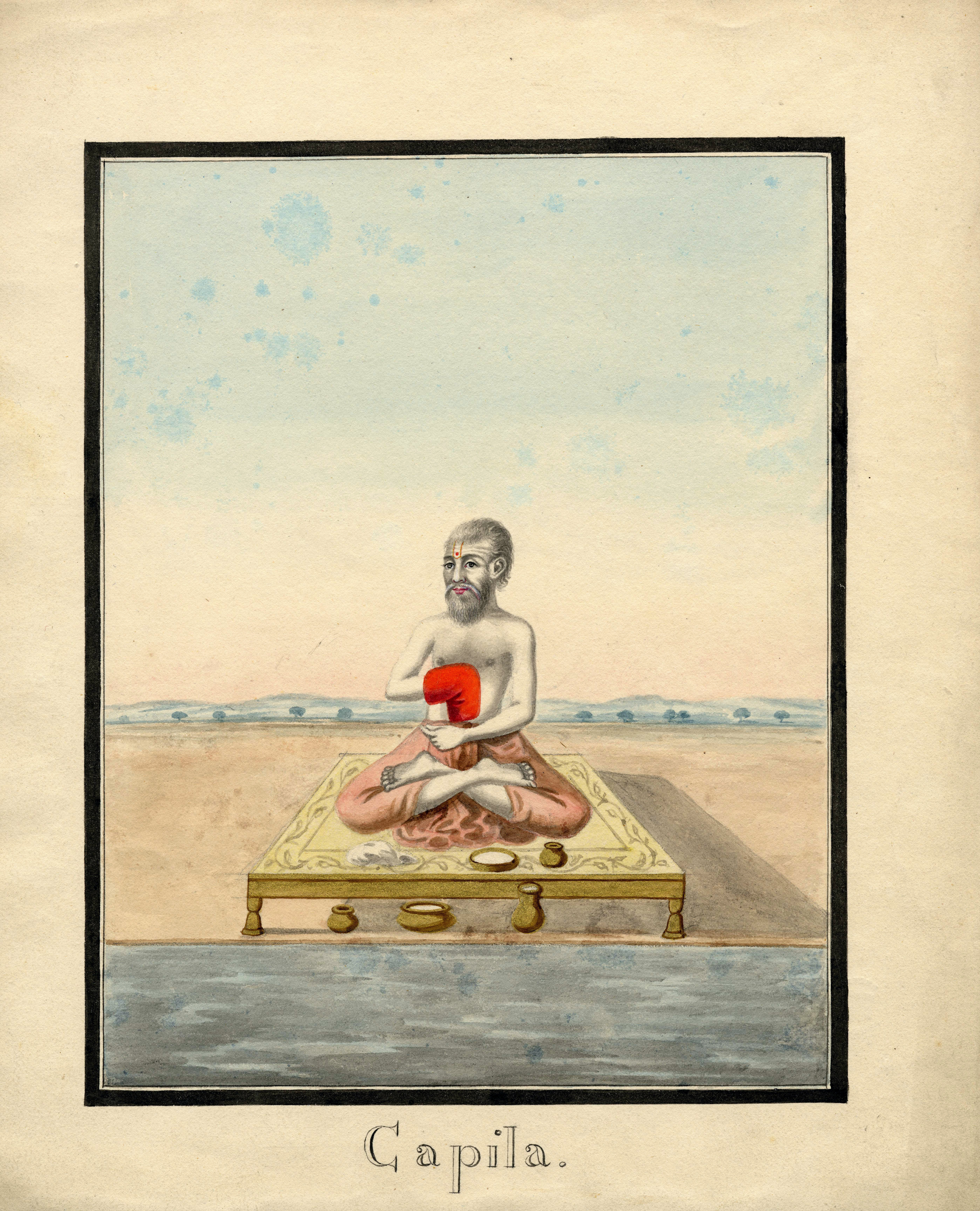
- Interactive map of Kapil Ashram

Monastery information
- Established: 8th Century - 7th Century BCE
- Dedication: Shankhya Shastra

People
- Founder: Kapila

Architecture
- Style: Hinduism

Site
- Location: Kakraul, Rahika, Madhubani district, Mithila
- Country: India
- Other information: Affiliation : Ancient Mithila University

Kapil Ashram ( Sanskrit : कपिल आश्रम ) was a Hindu monastery of the Vedic sage Kapila. He is the author of Shankhya Shastra of Ancient Indian philosophy. It is located at Kakraul village of Rahika block in Madhubani district of Mithila region of Bihar.

== Background ==
According to legend this place is related to Maharishi Kardam and Devhuti. Kapila was the son of Maharshi Kardam. It is believed that the Vedic sage Kapila was the devotee of Lord Shiva. He established Shivlinga at the Kakraul village known as Kapileshwar Sthan. There was an Ashram of Kapila where he developed and wrote the Shankhya Shastra of the Indian philosophy. There he taught his Shankhya Shastra to his disciples for many years. Seerdhawaja Janaka the king of Mithila also came here to study the Shankhya Shastra from the Vedic sage Kapila. This is the attractive tourist destination for Hindu pilgrims in the Mithila region. Hindu devotees from different parts of the district and the entire Mithila come here to worship the Shivlinga of the Kapileshwar Sthan temple.
