= Kapil Muni Temple =

Hindu temple in West Bengal, India

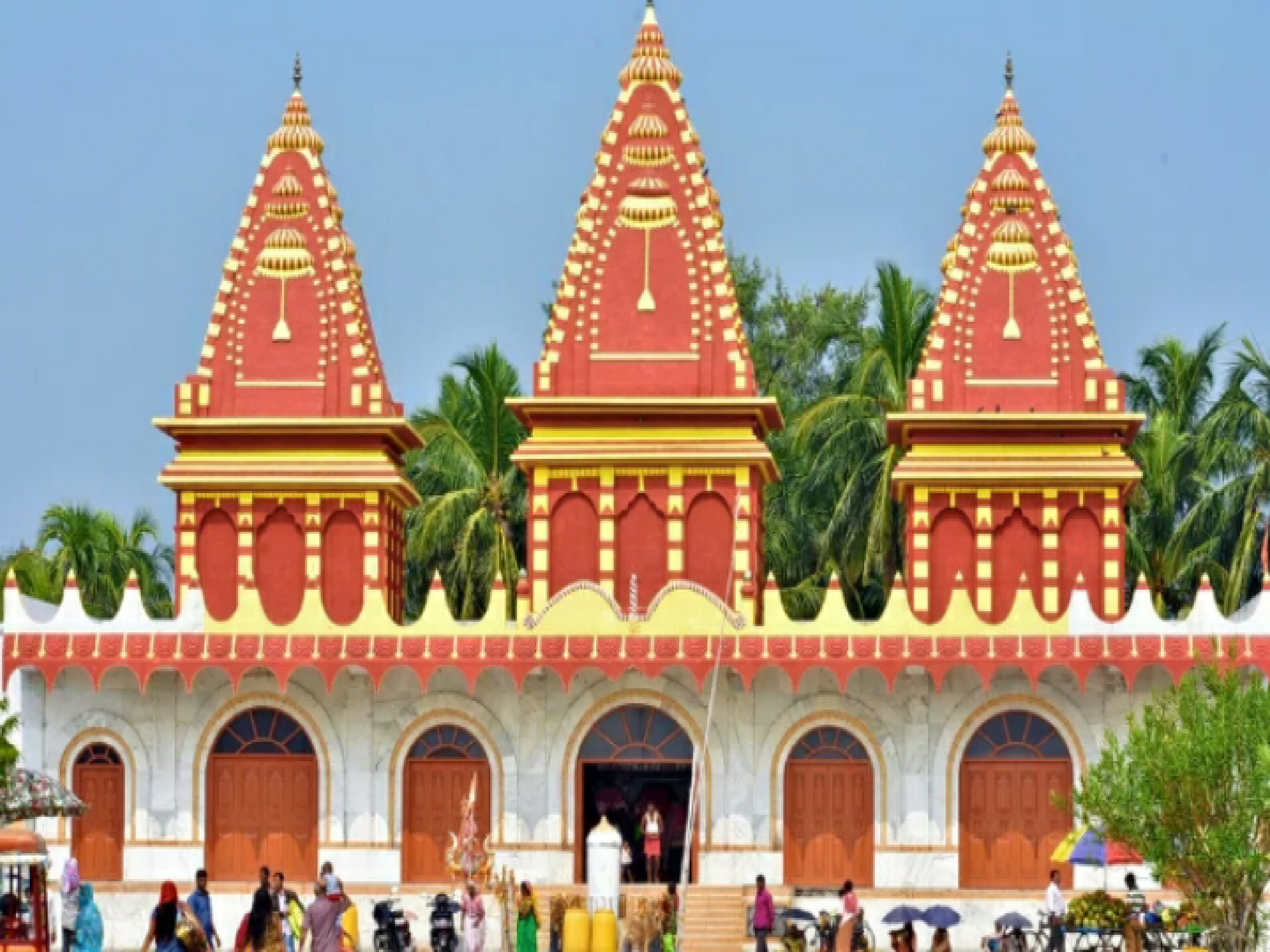

- Location within West Bengal

Religion
- Affiliation: Hinduism
- District: South 24 Parganas
- Deity: Ganga, Kapil Muni, King of the Sea
- Festival: Gangasagar Mela

Location
- Location: Gangasagar
- State: West Bengal
- Country: India
- Coordinates: 21.6365357°N 88.0733355°E

Architecture
- Creator: (Many reconstructions)
- Completed: 1974 (present structure)

Kapil Muni Temple or Kapil Muni Mandir (Bengali: কপিল মুনি মন্দির) is a Hindu temple located on the Gangasagar in the Indian state of West Bengal. It is one of the holiest pilgrimage sites for Hindus and it is believed that Kapil Muni did Tapas here.

== History ==
=== Ancient temples ===
A Gupta era temple existed on this spot. This temple was lost due to coastal erosion. Around the early 19th century, when Warren Hastings had the island cleared of vegetation and the site came under the zamindari of a local Bengali Hindu zamindar from Purba Medinipur called Yaduram who recovered the shrine of Kapilmuni. Then the site came under control of Ramanandi sadhus from Ayodhya. The old temple was made of bamboo which was destroyed in the late 50s or early 60s due to cyclones. The first brick-built temple was built in 1961 for Rs 20,000, and the roof of the temple was made of asbestos. The former Chief Minister Bidhan Chandra Roy contributed Rs 11,000 to the construction of the temple. The construction of the temple was done by "S Chakraborty & Co." The temple was smaller in size than the present temple.

=== New temple: 1974–present ===
The new temple was built in 1974. As the temple and temple premises are on the banks of the Ganges River and the Bay of Bengal, sea and river water enters the temple and temple premises occasionally during High tide or cyclonic storms. A strong tropical cyclone named Yaas formed in the Bay of Bengal in late May 2021. Due to the impact of this storm, tidal water entered Kapil Muni's Ashram and temple.
