= Kapilavastu =

Kapilavastu may refer to:

- Kapilavastu (ancient city), ancient city in the Indian subcontinent, capital of the Shakyas; proposed locations include:
  - Piprahwa, village in Siddharthnagar district, Uttar Pradesh, India
  - Tilaurakot, a village in Kapilvastu Municipality, Lumbini Province, Nepal
- Kapilvastu Assembly constituency, electoral constituency in Siddharthnagar district of Uttar Pradesh, India
- Kapilvastu District, district of Lumbini Province, Nepal
  - Kapilvastu Municipality or Taulihawa, a city in Lumbini Province, Nepal

== See also ==
- Kapila (disambiguation)
