= Sunil Kapila =

Sunil D. Kapila (born 1958) is an orthodontist and dental academic.

== Career ==
Kapila was trained as a dentist at the University of Nairobi, and completed a master's degree in orthodontics at the University of Oklahoma, funded partly via the Fulbright Program, then earned his doctorate in oral biology at the University of California, San Francisco. He then joined the UCSF faculty and was eventually appointed Eugene E. West Endowed Chair of Orthodontics. Kapila was named Robert W. Browne Endowed Professor of Dentistry at the University of Michigan in 2004. In 2013, while at Michigan, Kapila was granted fellowship by the International College of Dentists and invited to give by the American Association of Orthodontics to give the Jacob A. Salzmann Lecture. He returned to UCSF in 2016 to resume the West Chair of Orthodontics.

== Personal life ==
Kapila is married to Yvonne Hernandez-Kapila, a periodontist.
