= Kapil Mohan (civil servant) =

Indian civil servant

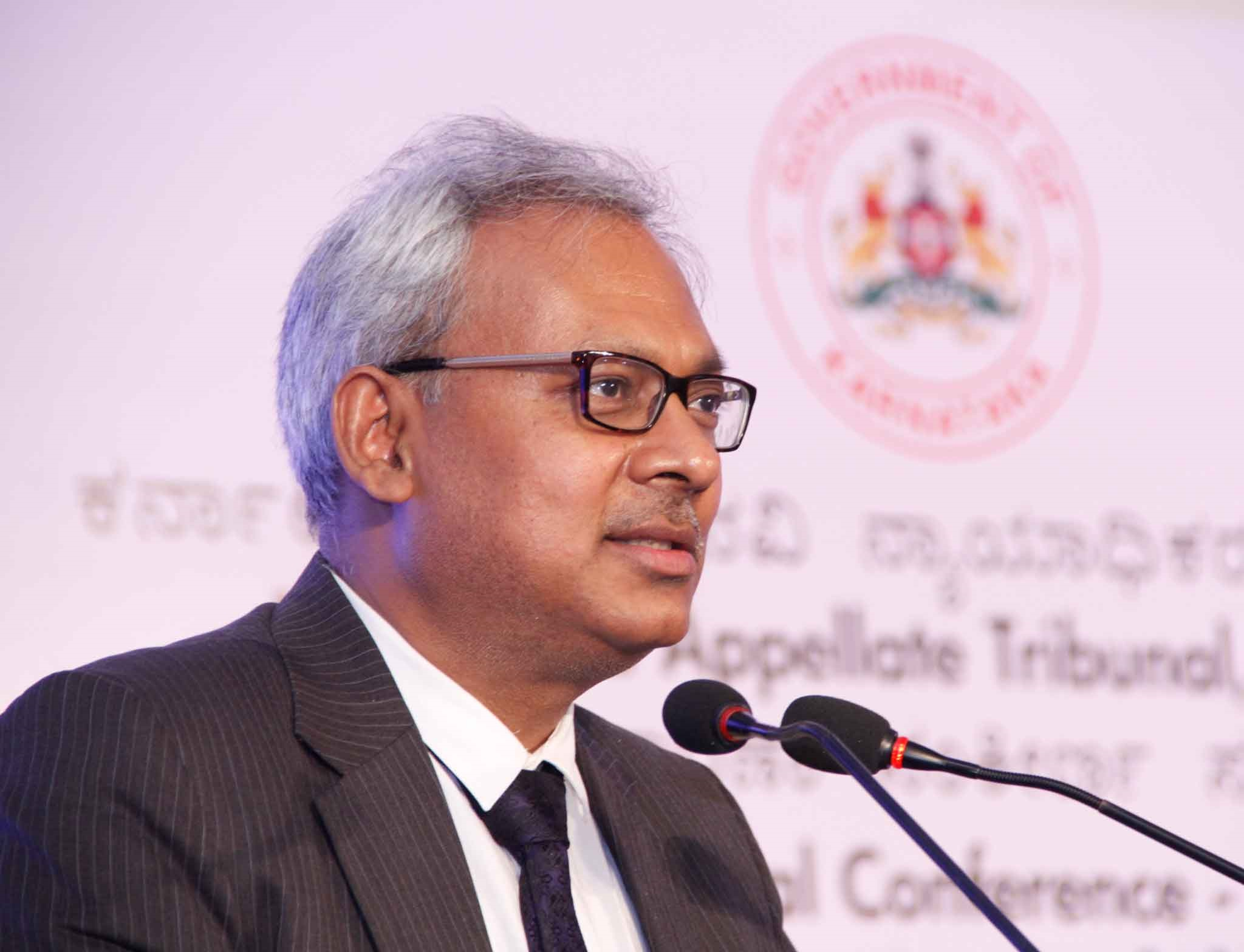
- Mohan at KAT National Conference 2017
- Born: 17 September 1963 (age 63); Bengaluru, Karnataka, India
- Education: B.Sc in Computer Science; MBA; MPP Certificate in Science, Technology and Environmental Policy from Princeton University, US
- Years active: 1990–present
- Employer: Government of India
- Organization: Indian Administrative Service
- Website: kapilmohan.in

Kapil Mohan is a 1990 batch Indian civil servant. He has served in the Ministry of Power for the Government of India during which he implemented the Restructured Accelerated Power Development & Reforms Program (RAPDRP) and the Rajiv Gandhi Grameen Vidyutikaran Yojana (RGGVY).

Currently he is the Principal Secretary and Chairman of BESCOM, Hubli Electricity Supply Company (HESCOM), CESCOM and Power Company of Karnataka Limited (PKCL). He also holds the concurrent charge as the principal secretary for Ports Infrastructure and Inland Water Transport.

He was previously serving as Principal Secretary to the State Government of Karnataka and looking after Infrastructure Development Department. The department looks after major infrastructure projects in Airports and Railways sectors.. He was previously working as Principal Secretary Housing, Govt of Karnataka and Interim Authority of Real Estate Regulatory Authority (RERA), Karnataka.

== Early life and education ==
Kapil Mohan was born in Bengaluru, Karnataka, India. He attended the Woodrow Wilson School of Public and International Affairs, Princeton University, USA, as a McNamara Fellowship in the areas of public policy and science, technology, and environmental policy. Kapil Mohan is a management graduate with a background in science.

== Career ==
He is a 1990 batch IAS officer of the Karnataka Cadre. He is also having the additional post as the Principal Secretary Housing Board, Govt of Karnataka. And he is also appointed as Interim Authority of Real Estate Regulatory Authority (RERA).

Mohan held the charge of Youth Empowerment and sports department which oversees youth affairs and sports development in the state. He held the charge of Education department which looks after primary and secondary education in the state.

He worked as Managing Director of Krishna Bhagya Jala Nigam Limited, a Govt. of Karnataka Undertaking. KBJNL is responsible for the development, operation, and maintenance of irrigation and maintenance of irrigation systems in Upper Krishna Project area. It is responsible for operation and maintenance of 6.07 lakh hectares of the command area.

== Awards and recognition ==
2001: Won the prestigious St Andrews Prize for the Environment awarded internationally competitive basis.

2004: Became Fellow of Leadership in Environment and Development (LEAD), an international organization working in the area of promotion of leadership in fields of environment and development.

2005: Elected as Director of LEAD in 2005

2008: Received Massachusetts Institute of Technology – IFMR award in an international competition on original work in urban development.

2009: Selected as Eisenhower Fellow from India on energy issue. The selection committee in India was headed by Mr. Kumarmangalam Birla and in USA by Gen. Colin Powell.

2013: Selected as one of the 60 Fellows who have made the transformational impact in 60 years of Eisenhower fellowship existence in 2013.
