= Gangasagara =

- village
- Location in Karnataka, India Gangasagara (India)
- Coordinates: 14.176357°N 77.256348°E
- Country: India
- State: Karnataka
- District: Tumkur
- Taluk: Pavagada
- Graama Panchayat: Ponnasamudra

Government
  - Body: Gram panchayat

Languages
  - Official: Kannada
- Time zone: UTC+5:30 (IST)
- Vehicle registration: KA

Gangasagara is a village in the Y N Hosakote Hobli of Pavagada taluk in Tumkur District, Karnataka, India. This place is approximately 200 kilometers away from Bengaluru, the capital city of Karnataka and situated near (2 km) to the state highway that connects Ballaari to Bengaluru.
