= Kapila Samaraweera =

Sri Lankan admiral

Rear Admiral Kapila Samaraweera
- Military career
- Allegiance: Sri Lanka
- Branch: Sri Lanka Navy
- Service years: 1985-2021
- Rank: Rear Admiral
- Unit: Executive branch
- Commands: Chief of Staff, Sri Lanka Navy; Deputy Chief of Staff; Commander Western Naval Area; Flag Officer Commanding Naval Fleet; Commander Southern Naval Area
- Conflicts: Sri Lankan Civil War
- Awards: Rana Sura Padakkama & Bar; Vishista Seva Vibhushanaya; Uttama Seva Padakkama

Rear Admiral Kapila Samaraweera, RSP, VSV, USP is a retired Sri Lankan admiral. He served as the Chief of Staff of the Sri Lanka Navy.

== Naval career ==
Having studied at the Dehiwala Maha Vidyalaya, Samaraweera joined the Sri Lanka Navy in 1985 as an Officer Cadet in the 13th intake in 1985 undergoing basic training at the Naval and Maritime Academy. On completion of his basic training at the Naval and Maritime Academy, he was commissioned as an Acting Sub Lieutenant in April 1987 and thereafter followed the Sub Lieutenant Technical Course in Pakistan and later specialized in Anti-Submarine Warfare at PNS Bahadur in Karachi.

Samaraweera had commanded Fast Attack Craft of the 4th Fast Attack Flotilla, SLNS Samudura, SLNS Udhara, SLNS Ranadheera and SLNS Hansaya. He had served as Naval Officer–in-Charge, Naval Complex Welisara; Director General (Coordinating), Office of the Chief of Defence Staff; Commandant, Naval Advanced Training Centre Boossa; Deputy Area Commander, Southern Naval Area; Director Naval Personnel; Flag Officer Commanding Naval Fleet and Commander, Southern Naval Area before his appointment as Deputy Chief of Staff and Commander, Western Naval Area.

He had followed the International Maritime Officers’ Course at the Coast Guard Training Centre, Yorktown and the National Defence College, Bangladesh. His awards include the Rana Sura Padakkama for combat gallantry and Vishista Seva Vibhushanaya for distinguished service. He was the Chairman of the Sri Lanka Navy Wrestling and Judo Pools from 2003 to 2013 and the founding Chairman of Karate and Wushu in the Navy in 2004 and 2009, having held Chairmanship until 2012. He retired on 15 January 2021, after 36 years of service in Navy.

Military offices
Preceded by Nishantha Ulugetenne	Chief of Staff of the Navy; September 2020} -	Succeeded by Incumbent
