= Yvonne Hernandez-Kapila =

American periodontist and cell and molecular biologist

- Education: BA, 1986, Stanford University; DDS, 1990, UCSF School of Dentistry; BSc, 1990, PhD, 1997, University of California, San Francisco
- Spouse: Sunil Kapila
- Scientific career
- Institutions: UCLA School of Dentistry; UCSF School of Dentistry; University of Michigan School of Dentistry
- Thesis: Specific domains of fibronectin modulate proteinase expression, apoptosis and invasion (1997)
- Website: dentistry.ucla.edu/research/labs/hernandez-kapila-lab

Yvonne L. Hernandez-Kapila is an American periodontist and cell and molecular biologist. She is a Professor of Dentistry in the Sections of Biosystems and Function and Periodontics, and the Felix and Mildred Yip Endowed Chair at the UCLA School of Dentistry. Hernandez-Kapila was elected a Fellow of the American Association for the Advancement of Science in 2025 for her work identifying "important host-microbe interactions and cellular and molecular mechanisms that govern oral cancer carcinogenesis and the pathogenesis of periodontal disease."

== Early life and education ==
Hernandez-Kapila completed her Bachelor of Arts degree at Stanford University in 1986 before enrolling at the University of California, San Francisco (UCSF). While at UCSF, she earned her Bachelor of Science degree, Dental degree, and PhD.

== Career ==
Following her PhD and professional training at UCSF, Hernandez-Kapila joined the faculty at the University of Michigan School of Dentistry in 2004. As an associate professor of Periodontics and Oral Medicine, her research team discovered that Ribosome-inactivating protein (RPI) plays a role in squamous-cell carcinoma cancer cells. They found that RPI communicated with a death receptor called Fas receptor and FAK during cell survival conditions. In November 2011, Hernandez-Kapila was appointed the inaugural Director of Global Initiatives at the School of Dentistry. As the Director, she launched three global engagement programs: the Kenya Summer Research Program, the Brazil-UM Exchange Program, and the United Nations Program. In 2013, Hernandez-Kapila was elected a Fellow of the International College of Dentists. The following year, she received the International Association for Dental Research 2014 Innovation in Oral Care Award. In 2015, Hernandez-Kapila led the first study into the effects of food-grade nisin on the oral microbiome.

Hernandez-Kapila left the University of Michigan in 2016 to join UCSF as the R. Earl Robinson Endowed Distinguished Professor of Periodontology and Chair of the Division of Periodontology. While in this role, her research team proved that bacteria associated with gum disease can also encourage the growth of cancers in the head and mouth. Hernandez-Kapila eventually left UCSF in 2022 to become a Professor of Dentistry in the Sections of Biosystems and Function and Periodontics, and the Felix and Mildred Yip Endowed Chair at the UCLA School of Dentistry. In 2024, she received the Norton M. Ross Award for Excellence in Clinical Research. The following year, she was elected a Fellow of the American Association for the Advancement of Science for her work identifying "important host-microbe interactions and cellular and molecular mechanisms that govern oral cancer carcinogenesis and the pathogenesis of periodontal disease."
