= Kapil Dev Prasad =

Indian weaver

Kapil Dev Prasad is a weaver from Bihar, India. He is known for popularising the Buddhist art of weaving ‘bawan buti’ (52 motifs) on sarees, bedsheets and curtains.

== Life and career ==
Kapil Dev Prasad was born in 1954. His family occupation involved the handloom. He comes from a small village named Basman Bigha village which is located 3 kilometres east-north of Bihar Sharif, Nalanda district headquarters in Bihar.

In 2023, he was awarded the Padma Shri, the country's fourth highest honour.
