= Kapil Singh Lalwani =

Indian actor

- Born: 1 November 1990 (age 34); Shivpuri, Madhya Pradesh (India)
- Occupation: Film actor
- Years active: 2012–present

Kapil Singh Lalwani (born 1 November 1990) is an Indian actor who appears in TV serials like Kundali Bhagya and Bade Achhe Lagte Hain. He is famous for playing Hirnasur in 2017 TV series Chandrakanta. Lalwani has also worked in Rajinikanth's film Darbar.

== Television ==
Year	Title	Role	Channel
2012	Savdhaan India	Inspector Rahul Deshmukh	Life OK
2013-2014	Bade Achhe Lagte Hain	Pranav Shukla	Sony TV
2015	Jodha Akbar	Raja Raghuveer	Zee TV
2015	Jai Jai Jai Bajrang Bali	Rudraketu	Sahara One
2017	Peshwa Bajirao	Abdullahh	Sony TV
2017	Devanshi	Raka	Colors TV
2018	Bahu Hamari Rajni Kant	Rana	Life OK
2018	Chandrakanta	Hirnasur	Colors TV
2021	Vighnaharta Ganesh	Yonda	Sony TV
2021	Kumkum Bhagya	Shetty	Zee TV
2022	Kundali Bhagya	Raja Bhai Don	Zee TV

== Filmography ==
Key
†	Denotes films that have not yet been released

Year	Film	Role	Notes
2014	Anjaan	-	Tamil-language action film
2016	Sarbjit	Troublemaker	based on a real life of Sarabjit Singh
2018	Teri Bhabhi Hai Pagle	Don	Distributed by Zee Music Company
2020	Darbar	-	stars Rajinikanth
