= Kapila Theertham =

Hindu temple in India

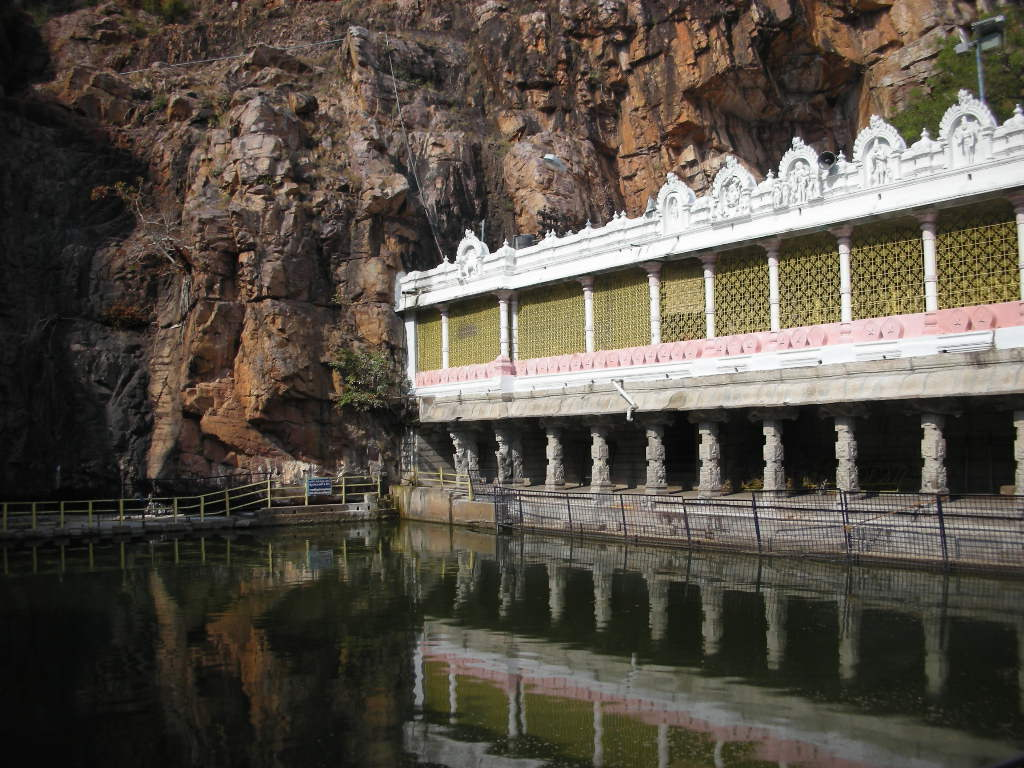

- Location in Andhra Pradesh

Religion
- Affiliation: Hinduism
- District: Tirupati
- Deity: Shiva as Kapileswara
- Festivals: Maha Shivaratri, Karthika Masam, Kapileswara Swamy Brahmotsavams
- Governing body: Tirumala Tirupati Devasthanams

Location
- Location: Tirupati
- State: Andhra Pradesh
- Country: India
- Interactive map of Kapila Theertham
- Coordinates: 13°39′23″N 79°25′15″E

Architecture
- Type: Dravidian architecture
- Temple: 9
- Inscriptions: Telugu and Dravidian languages

Website
- tirupati.org

Kapila Theertham is a small Shaivite temple and theertham, located at Tirupati in Andhra Pradesh, India. The idol of Shiva is believed to have been installed by Sage Kapila, so god Shiva here is referred to as Kapileswara.

The temple stands at the entrance to a mountain cave in one of the steep and vertical faces at the foot of the Tirumala hills, which are part of Seshachalam Hills, where the waters of the mountain stream fall directly into a temple tank.

At the temple entrance is a stone statue of Nandi, Shiva's bull mount.

== Etymology ==
The temple and Theertham had derived its name from Kapila Muni.

== Legend ==
According to temple legend, Kapila Muni had performed penance to Siva at this place and blissed with the Muni's devotion, Siva and Parvathi presented themselves. The Lingam is believed to be self-manifested. Kapila muni is believed to emerged from the Bilam (cavity) in the Pushkarini (Theertham) on to the earth.

== History ==
The temple received very good patronage from the rulers of Vijayanagara in the 13th thru 16th centuries, especially Saluva Narasimha Deva Raya, and the well known Sri Krishna Deva Raya, and some of the later rulers like Venkatapathi Raya, and Aliya Ramaraya, Sri Krishna Deva Raya's son-in-law.

== Administration ==
The present day temple is under the administration of Tirumala Tirupati Devasthanams(TTD). Under TTD this temple receives continued protection and sustainance, annual festivals that are celebrated great splendour.

== Religious importance ==
During 'Kartika' month on the occasion of its "mukkoti" on the 'Purnima' (full moon) day, all the teerthas situated in the three world's merge into this Kapila Teertham at noon for ten 'Ghatikas' (one ghatika is equivalent to 24 minutes). It is believed that persons bathing in it at that auspicious time will attain salvation from the cycle of birth and death ('Brahmaloka'). Moreover, those who have never offered Pindam (thidhi or thadhhina) to their departed ancestor souls can do it here and wash off your sins for non performance of it in past.

== Festivals ==
The temple celebrates all important festivals of Shaivism which includes Maha Shivaratri, Karthika Deepam, Vinayaka Chavithi, Adikirtika etc. Kapileswara Swamy Brahmotsavams is the biggest event of the temple celebrated by TTD during the month of February. It is a nine-day event where the processional deity of Lord Shiva and Parvathi will taken procession on different vahanams starting with Hamsa vahanam and ending with Trishula snanam (celestial bath to Siva Trident).

== Sub-shrines ==
There are many sub-shrines with-in the main temple premises. Temples for Kamakshi-concert of Shiva, Vinayaka, Subhramanya, Agasthesswara, Rukmini Satyabhama Sametha Sri Krishna are few among them.

== See also ==
- Hindu Temples in Tirupati
- Kapila
- Kapileshwar Temple, Bihar
