= Rahika =

Coordinates: 26.38°N 86.02°E

Rahika is a city in Madhubani district, Bihar, India. It is in the Darbhanga division Bisfi Vidhan Sabha constituency. The local language is Maithili. Rahika block is the headquarter block. Connected through various road from east to west and north to south. The centre point for Benipatti Jainagar madhubani and darbhanga. A political hub, the block has the ancient shiv mandir, Durga mandir and Vidyapati statue showing rich Maithil culture. The revenue village since British era the centre is known for its fish harvesting, various ponds etc. From several primary schools to the college, education infrastructure is the strong point of the block. Various tourist activities are here for the tourists.
