= Kapila =

Vedic Sage in Hindu tradition

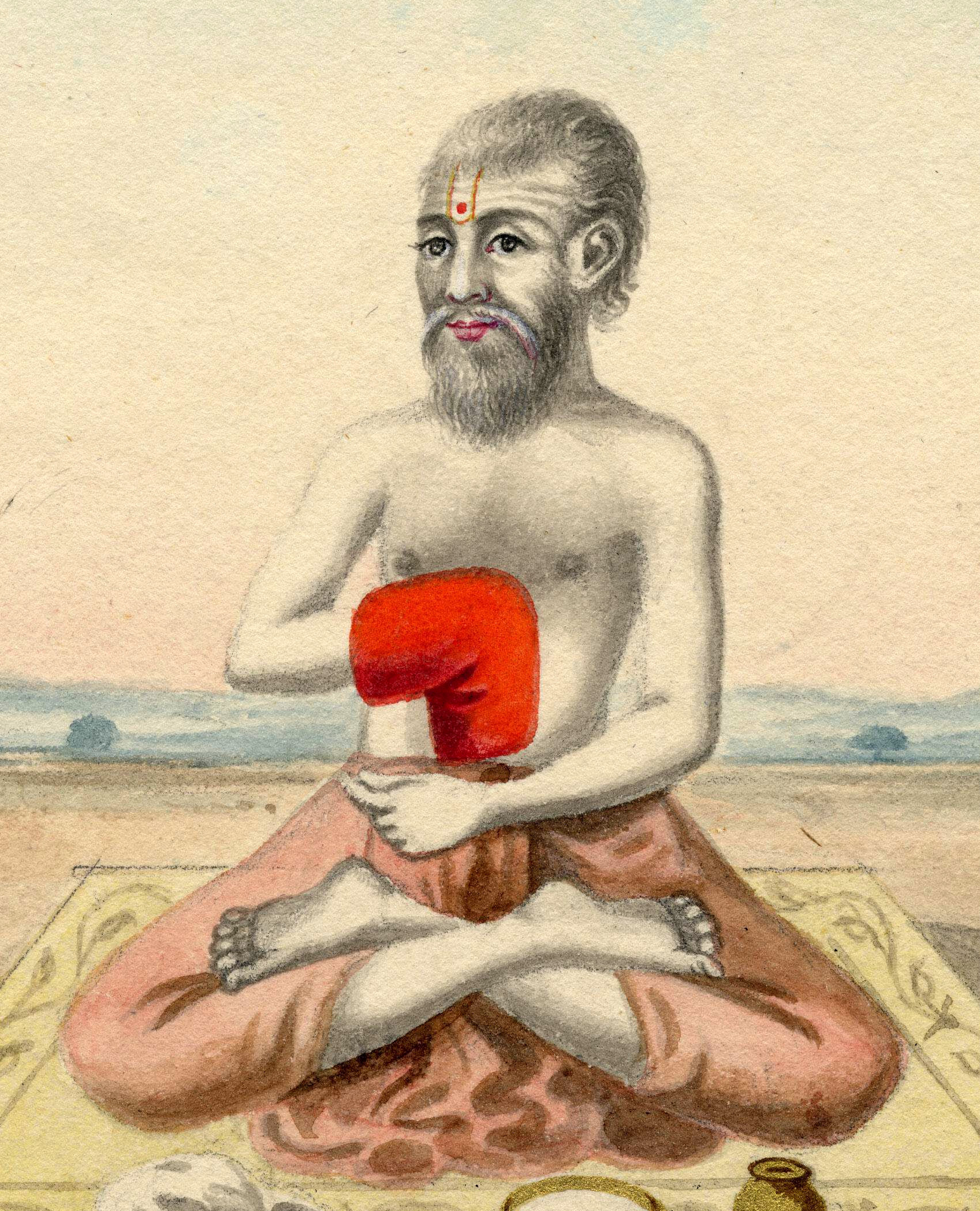
- Watercolour painting on paper of Kapila, a sage

Personal life
- Spouse: Dhriti
- Parent(s): Devahuti (mother), Kardama (father)

Religious life
- Religion: Hinduism
- Philosophy: Samkhya

Religious career
- Influenced: Buddha, Vyasa, Samkhya and Yoga philosophers

Kapila (Sanskrit: कपिल) (7th-6th-century BCE), also referred to as Cakradhanus, was a Vedic sage in Hindu tradition, (Note: The historicity of Kapila is debated. Several scholars have put forward that he is entirely mythological.) regarded the founder of the Samkhya school of Hindu philosophy.

His influence on Buddha and Buddhism has long been the subject of scholarly studies. There have been accusations by orthodox Buddhists that Sarvastivadins are heavily influenced by Samkhya school of philosophy.

According to the Brahmanda Purana, Kapila is described as an incarnation of Vishnu: "Bhagavān Nārāyaṇa will protect us all. The Lord of the universe has now been born in the world as Kapilācārya."

Many historic personalities in Hinduism and Jainism, mythical figures, pilgrimage sites in Indian religion, as well as an ancient variety of cow, are named after Kapila, or share his name.

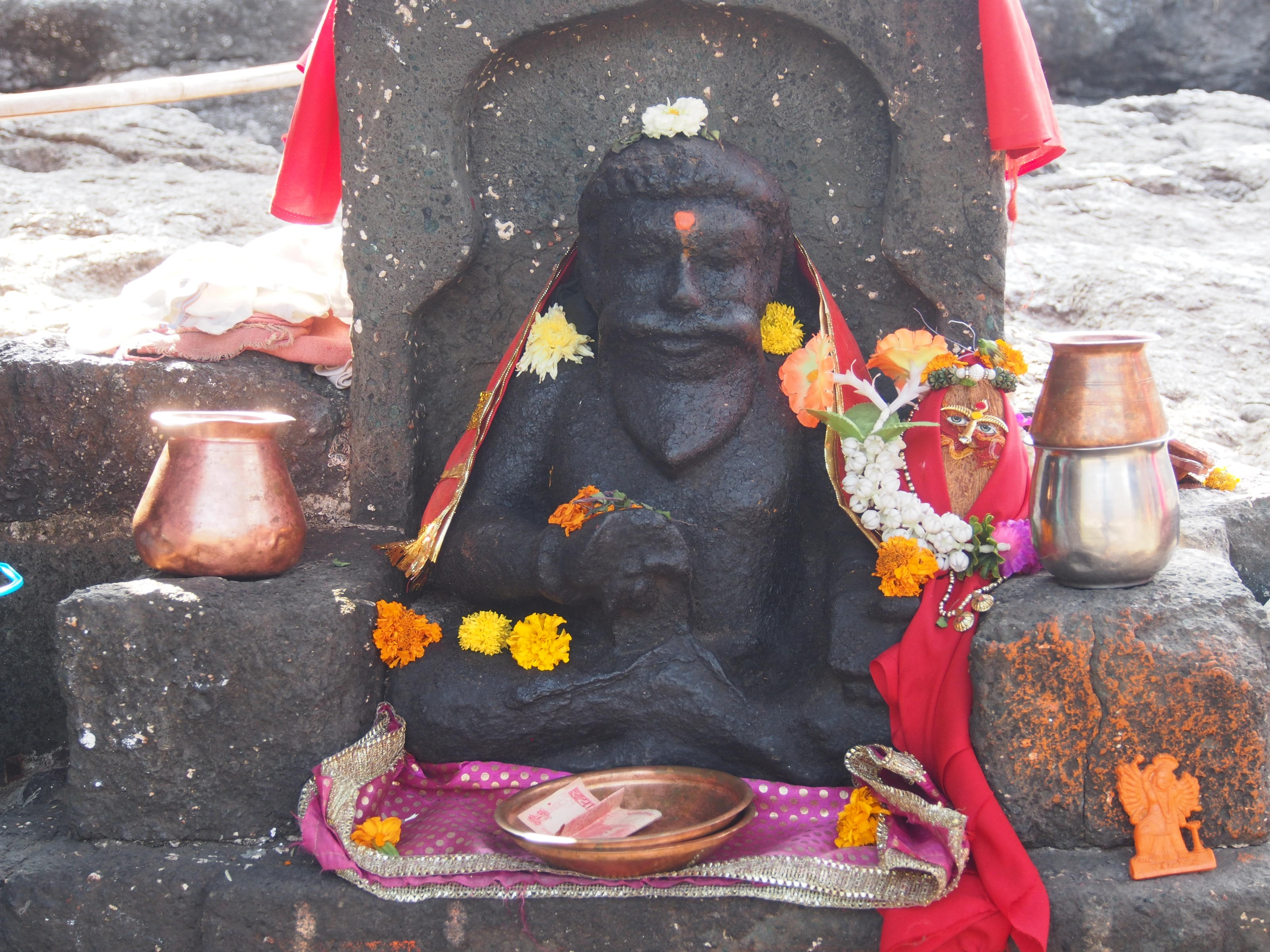
Statue of Kapila Maharshi, Nashik

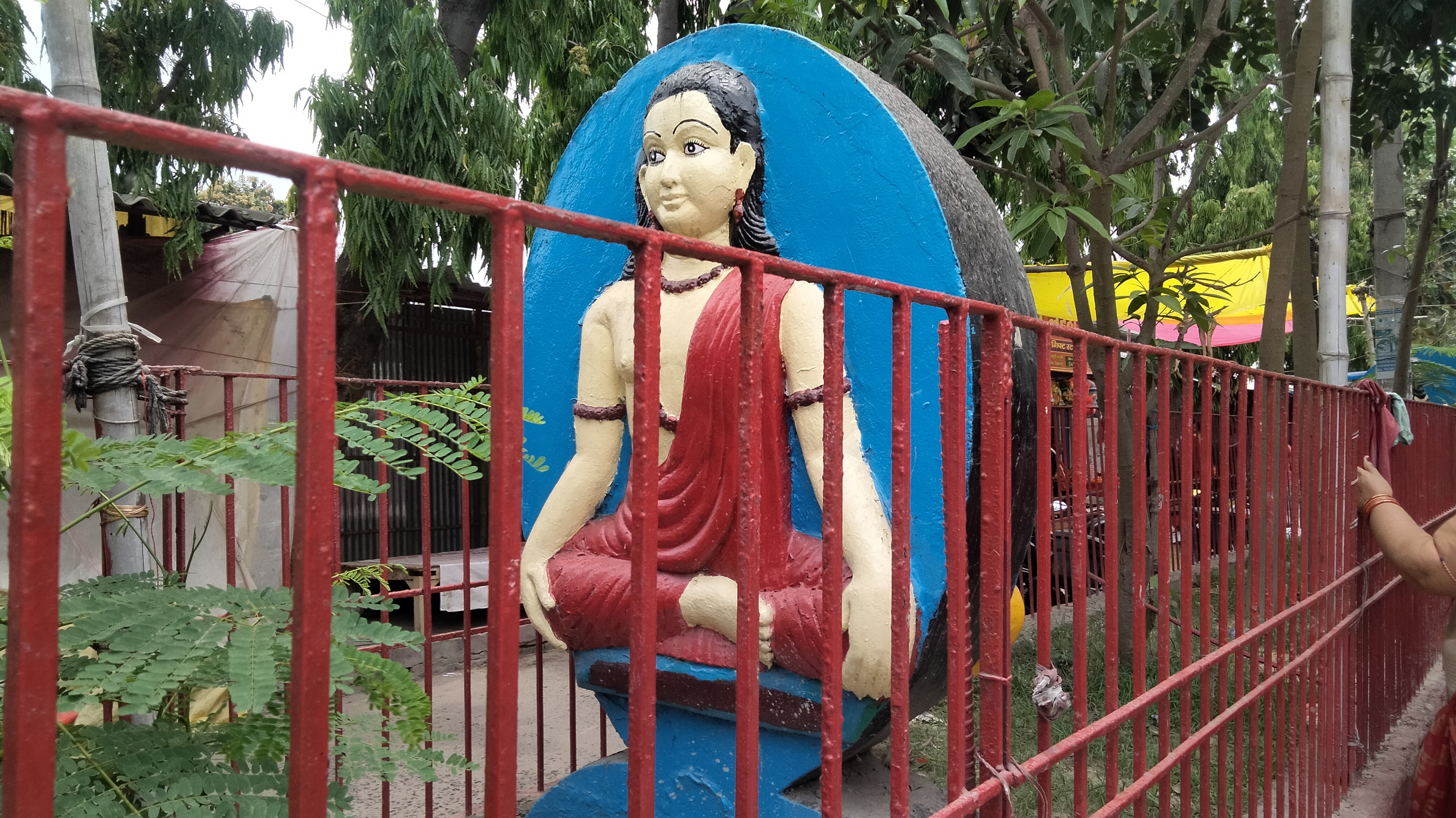
Memorial Statue of the sage Kapila at the entrance gate of the Uchchaith Bhagawati Mandir complex near Benipatti town in the Mithila region of Bihar

== Biography ==
The name Kapila appears in many texts, and likely refers to different people. The most famous reference is to the sage Kapila with his student Āsuri, who in the Indian tradition are considered the first masters of Samkhya school of Hindu philosophy. While he pre-dates Buddha, it is unclear which century he lived in, with some suggesting 6th century BCE. Others place him in the 7th century BCE. This places him in the late Vedic period (1500 BCE to 500 BCE), and he has been called a Vedic sage.

Kapila is credited with authoring an influential sutra, called Samkhya-sutra (also called Kapila-sutra), which aphoristically presents the dualistic philosophy of Samkhya. These sutras were explained in another well studied text of Hinduism called the Samkhyakarika. Beyond his Samkhya philosophy, he appears in many dialogues of Hindu texts, such as in explaining and defending the principle of ahimsa (non-violence) in the Mahabharata.

== Hinduism ==
Hindu texts give different accounts of Kapila. In the Bhagavata Purana, Kapila is described as an avatara of Bhagavan, born into the house of Kardama and as the teacher of Samkhya to his mother Devahūti.

=== Vedic texts ===
The Rigveda X.27.16 mentions Kapila (daśānām ekam kapilam) which the 14th-century Vedic commentator Sayana thought refers to a sage; a view that Chakravarti in 1951 and Larson in 1987 consider unreliable. Chakravarti suggests that the word refers to one of the Maruts, while Larson and Bhattacharya state that kapilam in that verse means "tawny" or "reddish-brown"; as it is also translated by Griffith. (Note: dashAnAmekaM kapilaM samAnaM taM hinvanti kratavepAryAya garbhaM mAtA sudhitaM vakSaNAsvavenantantuSayantI bibharti Translated by Griffith as: One of the ten, the tawny, shared in common, they send to execute their final purpose. The Mother carries on her breast the Infant of noble form and soothes it while it knows not.)

The Śata-piṭaka Series on the Śākhās of the Yajurveda mentions a Kapila Śākhā situated in Āryāvarta, which implies a Yajurveda school was named after Kapila. The term Kapileya, meaning "clans of Kapila", occurs in the Aitareya Brahmana VII.17 but provides no information on the original Kapila. (Note: Quote from Chakravarti's work: These Kapileyas are the clans of Kapila, but who was the original Kapila, we cannot know; for the text does not supply us with any further data. In his article on the Śākhās of the Yajurveda, Dr. Raghuvira acquaints us with one Kapila Śākhā that was situated in the Āryāvarta. But we do not know anything else as regards the Kapila with whom the said branch was associated. Further in the khilas of the Rgveda, one Kapila is mentioned along with some other sages. But the account of all these Kapilas is very meagre and hence cannot be much estimated in discussing the attitude of Sāṃkhya Kapila towards the Vedas. Though the Sāṃkhya vehemently criticises the Vedic sacrifices, but thereby it does not totally set aside the validity of the Vedas. In that case it is sure to fall under the category of the nāstika philosophy and could not exercise so much influence upon the orthodox minds; for it is well known that most of the branches of orthodox literature are more or less replete with the praise of Samkhya".) The pariśiṣṭa (addenda) of the Atharvaveda (at XI.III.3.4) (Note: The pariśiṣṭa to each Veda were composed after the Veda; Atharvaveda itself estimated to have been composed by about 1000 BCE.) mentions Kapila, Āsuri and Pañcaśikha in connection with a libation ritual for whom tarpana is to be offered. According to Larson, In verse 5.2 of Shvetashvatara Upanishad contains both the terms Samkhya and Kapila appear, with Kapila meaning colour as well as a "seer" (Rishi) with the phrase "ṛṣiṃ prasūtaṃ kapilam ... tam agre.."; which when compared to other verses of the Shvetashvatara Upanishad Kapila likely construes to Rudra and Hiranyagarbha. However, Max Muller is of the view that Hiranyagarbha, namely Kapila in this context is distinct and is later used to link Kapila and assign the authorship of Samkya system to Hiranyagarbha in reverence for the philosophical system.

=== Dharmasutras and other texts ===
Non-violence

Fearlessness to all living beings from my side,
Svāhā!

— Kapila, Baudhayana Grihya Sutra, 4.16.4
Translators: Jan E. M. Houben, Karel Rijk van Kooij

As son of Prahlada: The Baudhayana Dharmasutra mentions the Asura (Note: In Vedic texts, Asura refers to any spiritual or divine being. Later, the meaning of Asura contrasts with Deva.) Kapila is the son of Prahlada in the chapter laying rules for the Vaikhanasas. (Note: Baudhayana Dharma Sutra, Prasna II, Adhyaya 6, Kandika 11, Verses 1 to 34: 14. A hermit is he who regulates his conduct entirely according to the Institutes proclaimed by Vikhanas.(...); 28. With reference to this matter they quote also (the following passage): 'There was, forsooth, an Âsura, Kapila by name, the son of Prahlâda. Striving with the gods, he made these divisions. A wise man should not take heed of them.') The section IV.16 of Baudhāyana Gṛhyasūtra mentions Kapila as the one who set up rules for ascetic life. Kapila is credited, in the Baudhayana Dharmasutra, with creating the four Ashrama orders: Brahmachārya, Grihastha, Vānaprastha and Sanyāsa, and suggesting that renouncer should never injure any living being in word, thought or deed. He is said to have made rules for renouncement of the sacrifices and rituals in the Vedas, and an ascetic's attachment instead to the Brahman / ब्रह्मन् (not to be confused with Brāhmin). (Note: The Baudhayana Dharmasutra Prasna II, Adyaya 6, Kandiaka 11, Verses 26 to 34 dissuade the Vaikhanasas from sacrificial ritual works in the Vedas.) In other Hindu texts such as the Mahabharata, Kapila is again the sage who argues against sacrifices, and for non-violence and an end to cruelty to animals, with the argument that if sacrifices benefited the animal, then logically the family who sacrifices would benefit by a similar death. According to Chaturvedi, in a study of inscriptions of Khajuraho temples, the early Samkhya philosophers were possibly disciples of female teachers. (Note: Quote from p. 49–51: Of course, the Panchatantrikas accorded a place of honour to Kapila who was designated muni and paramarishi, and even identified with Narayana. The original concept of Kapila, the asura exponent of one of the oldest systems of philosophy is, however, preserved in the present inscription. (...) The Rūpamaņḍana and Aparājittapŗichha accounts of the deity mention a female face instead of Kapila which has puzzled scholars. In this connection, it may be pointed out that in the Mahabharata, Pañcaśīkha the disciple of Āsuri has been called Kapileya. He was so named because he was fed on the breast-milk of a brahmana lady, Kapila. According to Chattopadhyaya, "We have to take the story of Kapila breast-feeding Panchasikha ina figurative sense and if we do so the myth might suggest the story of an original female preceptor of the Samkhya system.")

=== Puranas ===
Kapila, states George Williams, lived long before the composition of the Epics and the Puranas, and his name is coopted in various later composed mythologies.

- As an ascetic and as Vishnu: In the Brahma Purana, when the king Vena abandoned the Vedas, declared that he is the only creator of dharma, and broke all limits of righteousness and was killed, Kapila advises hermits to churn Vena's thigh from which emerged Nishadas, and his right hand from which Prthu originated who made earth productive again. Kapila and hermits then went to Kapilasangama, a holy place where rivers meet. The Brahma Purana also mentions Kapila in the context of Sagara's 60,000 sons who looking for their Ashvamedha horse, disturbed Vishnu who is sleeping in the shape of Kapila. He woke up, the brilliance in his eyes burnt all but four of Sagara's sons to ashes, leaving few survivors carrying on the family lineage. Sagara's son is King Dilipa and his grandson is Bhagiratha. On the advice of his guru Trithala, Bhagiratha did penance for a thousand years (according to god timeline) to please Ganga, to gain the release his 60,000 great-uncles from the curse of saint Kapila.
- As Vishnu's incarnation: The Narada Purana enumerates two Kapilas, one as the incarnation of Brahma and another as the incarnation of Vishnu. The Bhagavata, Brahmanda, Vishnu, Padma, Skanda, Narada Puranas; and the Valmiki Ramayana mentions Kapila as an incarnation of Vishnu. The Padma Purana and Skanda Purana identify him as Vishnu himself. Bhagavata Purana identify him as Vedagarbha Vishnu. The Vishnusahasranama mentions Kapila as a name of Vishnu. Vijnanabhikshu, in his commentary on Samkhya sutras, mentions Kapila, the founder of Samkhya, as Vishnu. Jacobsen suggests that Kapila of the Veda, Śramaṇa tradition, and the Mahabharata is the same person as Kapila the founder of Samkhya; and this individual is considered as an incarnation of Vishnu in the Hindu texts.
- As son of Kardama muni: Book 3 of the Bhagavata Purana, states that Kapila is the son of Kardama Prajapati and his wife Devahuti. Kardama is born from Chaya, the reflection of Brahma. Brahma asks Kardama to procreate upon which Kardama goes to the banks of Sarasvati river, practices penance, sees Vishnu and is told by Vishnu that Manu, the son of Brahma will arrive there with his wife Shatarupa in search of a groom for their daughter Devahuti. Vishnu advises Kardama to marry Devahuti, and blesses Kardama that he himself will be born as his son. Besides Kapila as their only son, Kardama and Devahuti had nine daughters, namely Kala, Anusuya, Sraddha, Havirbhu, Gati, Kriya, Khyati, Arundhati and Shanti who were married to Marici, Atri, Angiras, Pulastya, Pulaha, Kratu, Bhrigu, Vashistha, and Atharvan respectively. H.H.Wilson notes that the Bhagavata adds a third daughter Devahuti to introduce the long legend of Kardama, and of their son Kapila, an account not found elsewhere. Kapila is described, states Daniel Sheridan, by the redactor of the Purana, as an incarnation of the supreme being Vishnu, in order to reinforce the Purana teaching by linking it to the traditional respect to Kapila's Samkhya in Hinduism. In the Bhagavata Purana, Kapila presents to his mother Devahuti, the philosophy of yoga and theistic dualism. Kapila's Samkhya is also described through Krishna to Uddhava in Book 11 of the Bhagavata Purana, a passage also known as the "Uddhava Gita".
- As son of Kashyapa: The Matsya Purana mentions Kapila as the son of Kashyapa and his wife Danu, daughter of Daksha Prajapati. Kapila is one among Danu's 100 sons, and her other sons (Kapila's brothers) mentioned in the Vishnu Purana include Dvimurddha, Shankara, Ayomukha, Shankhushiras, Samvara, Ekachakra, Taraka, Vrishaparvan, Svarbhanu, Puloman, Viprachitti and other Danavas.
- As son of Vitatha or Bharadwaja: In the Brahma Purana and in the Harivamsa Kapila is the son of Vitatha. Daniélou translates Vitatha to inaccuracy; and Wilson notes that Bharadwaja is also named Vitatha (unprofitable); while he is given in adoption to Bharata. Vishnu Purana notes Bhavanmanyu is the son of Vitatha but Brahma Purana and Harivamsa omit this and make Suhotra, Anuhotra, Gaya, Garga, and Kapila the sons of Vitatha. The Brahma Purana differs from other Puranas in saying that Vitatha is the son of Bharadwaja; upon the death of Bharata, Bharadwaja installed Vitatha as the king, before leaving for the forest.

=== Kapila Devahuti Samvada ===
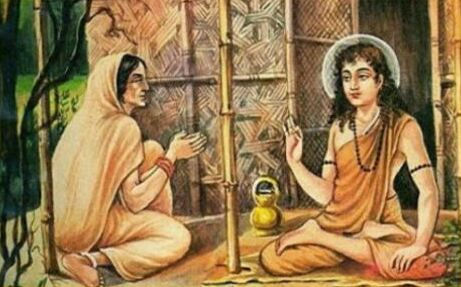
Kapila and Devahuti in dialogue

The Kapila-Devahuti Samvada, detailed in the Third Canto of the Bhagavat Purana, serves as a foundational dialogue for the theological presentation of Samkhya philosophy. Krishna also mentioned this concept briefly to Arjun amidst their conversation during the Mahabharata war, which has been mentioned in the Bhagavad Gita, Chapter 2, called Samkhya Yoga.

The narrative begins with Devahuti approaching her son Kapila, identified as the Supreme Lord, and expressing distress over a life spent in sense enjoyment, which she regards as wasted. She seeks fearlessness and liberation from suffering. She attributes her condition to bodily identification, articulated as aham mama iti ("I and mine"), and asks Kapila to remove her attachment to the physical body and its sense of ownership. Kapila responds by teaching Samkhya, described as a system of discriminative knowledge. By analyzing the constituents of material reality (tattvas), he distinguishes matter (prakriti) from spirit (purusa).

The dialogue aims to dispel identification with the body and mind, reduce attachment to material existence, and ground yoga, meditation on God, devotion, and intellectual stability in systematic knowledge of nature.

=== Imagery in the Agamas ===
Kapila's imagery is depicted with a beard, seated in Padmāsana with closed eyes indicating Dhyāna, with a Jaṭā-maṇḍala around the head, showing high shoulders indicating he is greatly adept in controlling breath, draped in deer skin, wearing the Yagñopavīta, with a Kamaṇḍalu near him, with one hand placed in front of the crossed legs, and feet marked with lines resembling outline of a lotus. This Kapila is identified with Kapila the founder of Sāṅkhya system; while the Vaikhānasasāgama gives somewhat varying description. The Vaikhānasasāgama places Kapila as an āvaraņadēvāta and allocates the south-east corner of the first āvaraņa. As the embodiment of the Vedas his image is seated facing east with eight arms; of which four on the right should be in abhaya mudra, the other three should carry the Chakra, Khaḍga, Hala; one left hand is to rest on the hip in the kațyavarlambita pose and other three should carry the Ṡaṅkha, Pāśa and Daṇḍa.

=== Other descriptions ===
- The name Kapila is sometimes used as an epithet for Vasudeva with Vasudeva having incarnated in the place named Kapila.
- Pradyumna assumed the form of Kapila when he became free from desire of worldly influences.
- Kapila is as one of the seven Dikpalas with the other six being Dharma, Kala, Vasu, Vasuki, Ananta.
- The Jayakhya Samhita of 5th century AD alludes to the Chaturmukha Vishnu of Kashmir and mentions Vishnu together with Varaha, Nrsimha and Kapila defeat the asuras appearing in zoomorphic forms with Nrsimha and Varaha posited to be incarnations of Vishnu and Kapila respectively.
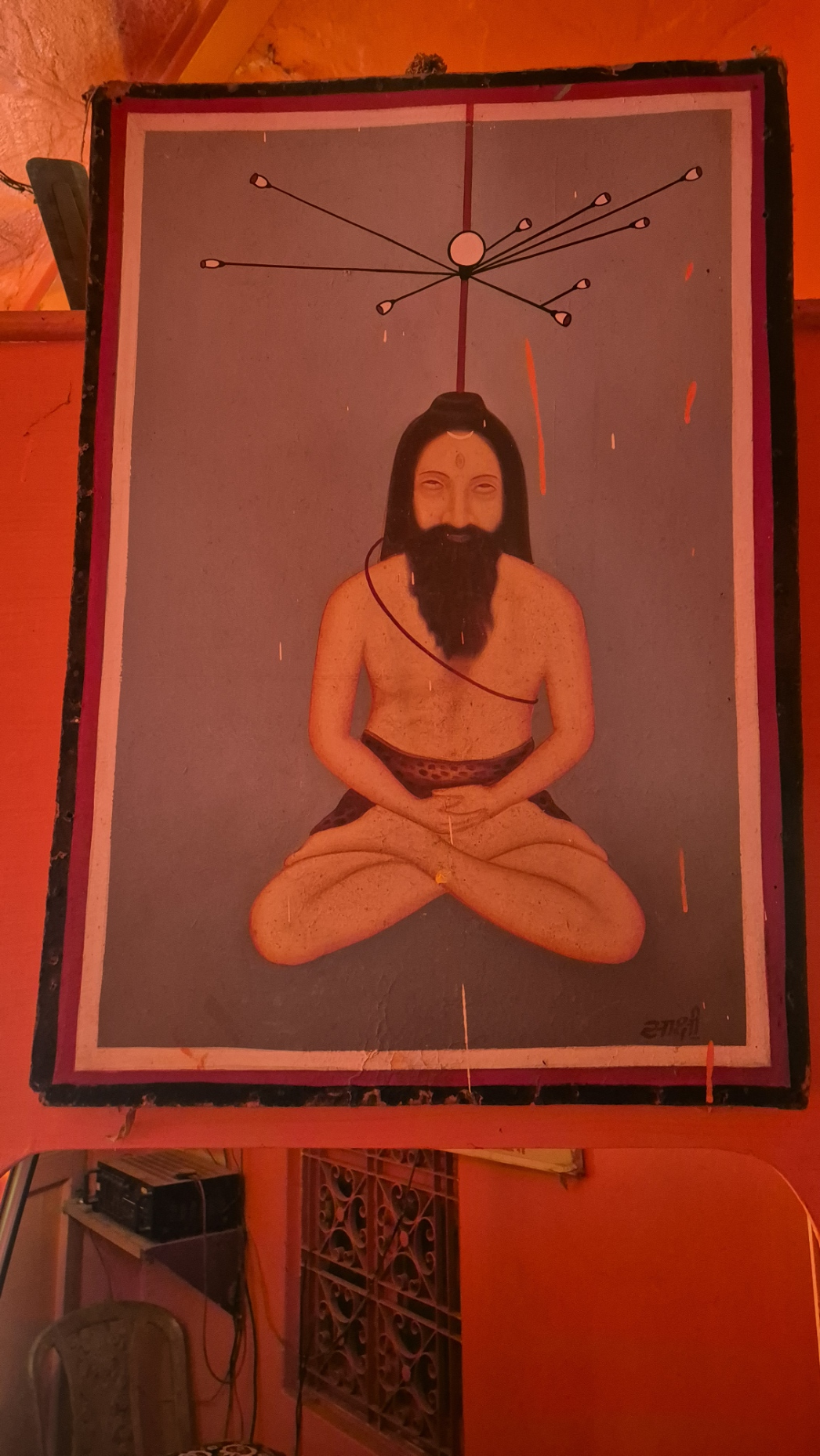
- Sketch of Kapil Muni at Kapil Sankhya Ashram, Varanasi
  In the Vamana Purana, the Yakshas were sired by Kapila with his consort Kesini who is from the Khasa class; the epics attribute the origin of Yakshas to a cosmic egg or to the sage Pulastya; while other puranas posit Kashyapa as the progenitor of Yakshas with his consort Vishva or Khasha.
- In some Puranas, Kapila is also mentioned as a female, a daughter of Khaśā and a Rākșasī, after whom came the name Kāpileya gaņa. In the Mahabharata, Kapila is a daughter of Daksha (Note: Section LXV of the Sambhava Parva of the Mahabharat states: The daughters of Daksha are, O tiger among men and prince of the Bharata race, Aditi, Diti, Danu, Kala, Danayu, Sinhika, Krodha, Pradha, Viswa, Vinata, Kapila, Muni, and Kadru ... The Brahmanas, kine, Gandharvas, and Apsaras, were born of Kapila as stated in the Purana.) and having married Kashyapa gave birth to the Brahmanas, Kine, Gandharvas and Apsaras.

== Jainism ==
Kapila is mentioned in chapter VIII of the Uttaradhyayana-sutra, states Larson and Bhattacharya, where a discourse of poetical verses is titled as Kaviliyam, or "Kapila's verses".

The name Kapila appears in Jaina texts. For example, in the 12th century Hemacandra's epic poem on Jain elders, Kapila appears as a Brahmin who converted to Jainism during the Nanda Empire era.

According to Jnatadharmakatha, Kapila is a contemporary of Krishna and the Vasudeva of Dhatakikhanda. The text further mentions that both of them blew their shankha (conch shell) together.

== Buddhism ==
Buddhists literature, such as the Jataka tales, state the Buddha is Kapila in one of his previous lives.

Scholars have long compared and associated the teachings of Kapila and Buddha. For example, Max Muller wrote (abridged),

There are no doubt certain notions which Buddha shares in common, not only with Kapila, but with every Hindu philosopher. (...) It has been said that Buddha and Kapila were both atheists, and that Buddha borrowed his atheism from Kapila. But atheism is an indefinite term, and may mean very different things. In one sense, every Indian philosopher was an atheist, for they all perceived that the gods of the populace could not claim the attributes that belong to a Supreme Being (Absolute, the source of all that exists or seems to exist, Brahman / ब्रह्मन्). (...) Kapila, when accused of atheism, is not accused of denying the existence of an Absolute Being. He is accused of denying the existence of an Ishvara.

— Max Muller et al., Studies in Buddhism

Max Muller states the link between the more ancient Kapila's teachings on Buddha can be overstated. This confusion is easy, states Muller, because Kapila's first sutra in his classic Samkhya-sutra, "the complete cessation of pain, which is of three kinds, is the highest aim of man", sounds like the natural inspiration for Buddha. However, adds Muller, the teachings on how to achieve this, by Kapila and by Buddha, are very different.

As Buddhist art often depicts Vedic deities, one can find art of both Narayana and Kapila as kings within a Buddhist temple, along with statues of Buddhist figures such as Amitabha, Maitreya, and Vairocana.

In Chinese Buddhism, the Buddha directed the Yaksha Kapila and fifteen daughters of Devas to become the patrons of China.

== Works ==
The following works were authored by Kapila, some of which are lost, and known because they are mentioned in other works; while few others are unpublished manuscripts available in libraries stated:

- Manvadi Shrāddha - mentioned by Rudradeva in Pakayajna Prakasa.
- Dṛṣṭantara Yoga - also named Siddhāntasāra available at Madras Oriental Manuscripts Library.
- Kapilanyayabhasa - mentioned by Alberuni in his works.
- Kapila Purana - referred to by Sutasamhita and Kavindracharya. Available at Sarasvati Bhavana Library, Varanasi.
- Kapila Samhita - there are 2 works by the same name. One is the samhita quoted in the Bhagavatatatparyanirnaya and by Viramitrodaya in Samskaras. Another is the Samhita detailing pilgrim centers of Orissa.
- Kapilasutra - Two books, namely the Samkya Pravacana Sutra and the Tattvasamasasutra, are jointly known as Kapilasutra. Bhaskararaya refers to them in his work Saubhagya-bhaskara.
- Kapila Stotra - Chapters 25 to 33 of the third khanda of the Bhagavata Mahapurana are called Kapila Stotra.
- Kapila Smriti - Available in the work Smriti-Sandarbha, a collection of Smritis, from Gurumandal Publications.
- Kapilopanishad - Mentioned in the Anandasrama list at 4067 (Anandasrama 4067).
- Kapila Gita - also known as Dṛṣṭantasara or Siddhāntasāra.
- Kapila Pancharatra - also known as Maha Kapila Pancharatra. Quoted by Raghunandana in Saṃskāra Mayukha.

Ayurveda books mentioning Kapila's works are:

1. Vagbhatta mentions Kapila's views in Sutrasthana.
2. Nischalakara mentions Kapila's views in his commentary on Chikitsa Sangraha.
3. Kapila's views are quoted in Ayurvedadipika.
4. The Kavindracharya list at 987 mentions a book named Kapila Siddhanta Rasayana.
5. Hemadri quotes Kapila's views in Ashtangahradaya (16th verse) of the commentary Ayurveda Rasayana.
6. Sarvadarsanasamgraha (Sarva-darśana-saṃgraha) mentions Kapila's views on Raseśvara school of philosophy.

== Significance ==
Kapila, the founder of Samkhya, has been a highly revered sage in various schools of Hindu philosophy. Gaudapada (~500 CE), an Advaita Vedanta scholar, in his Bhasya called Kapila as one of the seven great sages along with Sanaka, Sananda, Sanatana, Asuri, Vodhu and Pancasikha. Patanjali, the Yoga scholar, in his Yogasutra-bhasya wrote Kapila to be the "primal wise man, or knower". The Buddhist sources mention that the city of Kapilavastu is built in the honor of Kapila. It is in Kapilavastu that the Buddha is born; and, it is here he spent the first twenty-nine years of his life.

== See also ==
- Prahlada
- Narada
- Vyasa
- Bhakti yoga
- Samkhya
- Ancient Mithila University
- Kapila Theertham
- Kapileshwar Temple, Bihar
- Kaul Village
- Kalayat

== Sources ==
- von Glasenapp, Helmuth (1999), Jainism: An Indian Religion of Salvation [Der Jainismus: Eine Indische Erlosungsreligion], Shridhar B. Shrotri (trans.), Delhi: Motilal Banarsidass, ISBN 81-208-1376-6
- Jacobsen, Knut A. (2008). Kapila, Founder of Sāṃkhya and Avatāra of Viṣṇu: With a Translation of Kapilāsurisaṃvāda. New Delhi: Munshiram Manoharlal. ISBN 978-81-215-1194-0.
