= Marwa (mandap) =

Hut made for special occasion in Mithila region

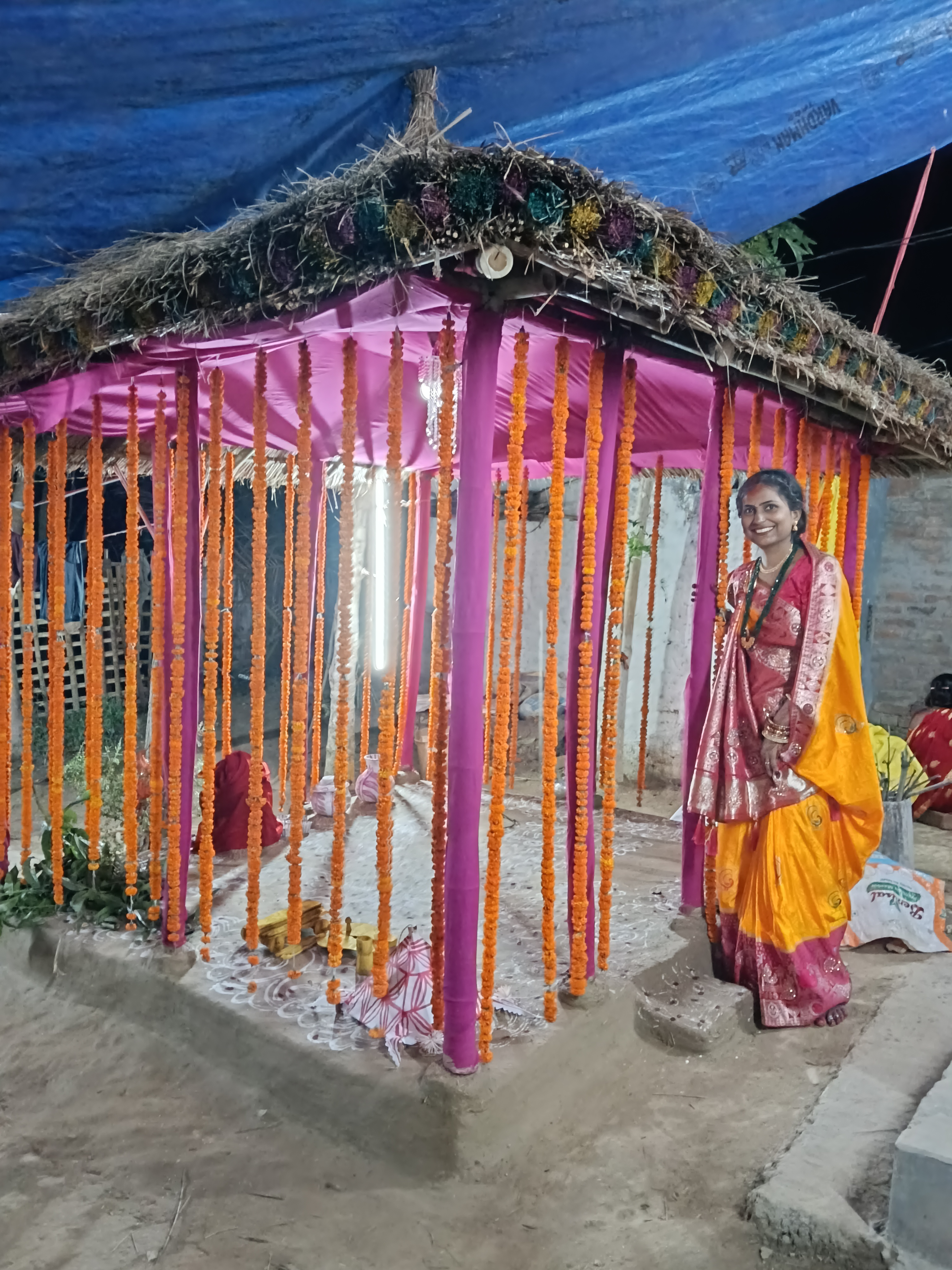
View of a marwa prepared for conducting Maithil Upanayan rituals at Basuki Bihari village in the Mithila region of India

A marwa, or maithil mandap, is an open hut made for the auspicious occasions of Upanayana and Vivah, used in the Mithila region of the Indian subcontinent. It is generally erected in the middle of the inner courtyard of a Maithil family. In the region of Mithila, the sanskar of Janeu known as Maithil Upanayan is performed on a decorated Marwa made of bamboo. In the tradition of Maithil Brahmins, a marwa made of green bamboos is considered as a sacred place for performing the auspicious rituals of Upanayana and Vivah ceremonies.

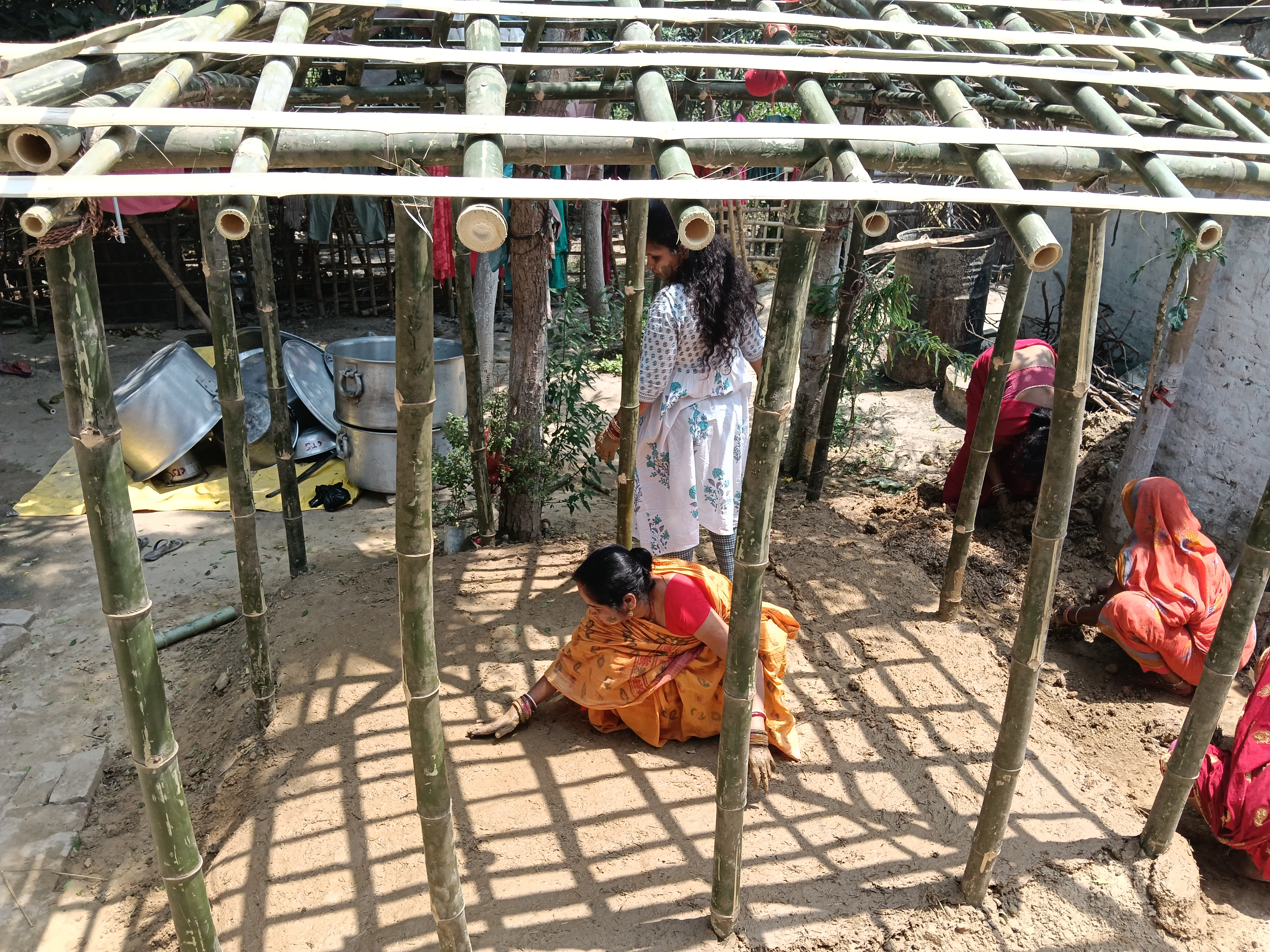
Smearing the floor of an under-construction Marwa by mixture of cow dung, mud and water

The floor of a marwa is cleaned by smearing mixture of cow dung, mud and water. In Hinduism, cleaning by cow dung is considered as sacred. It is used for purification of the floor's surface of the marwa. It is cleaned by the women of the family. After that, when the floor becomes dry, a lady of the family draws beautiful images of Aripan on the floor for its decoration.

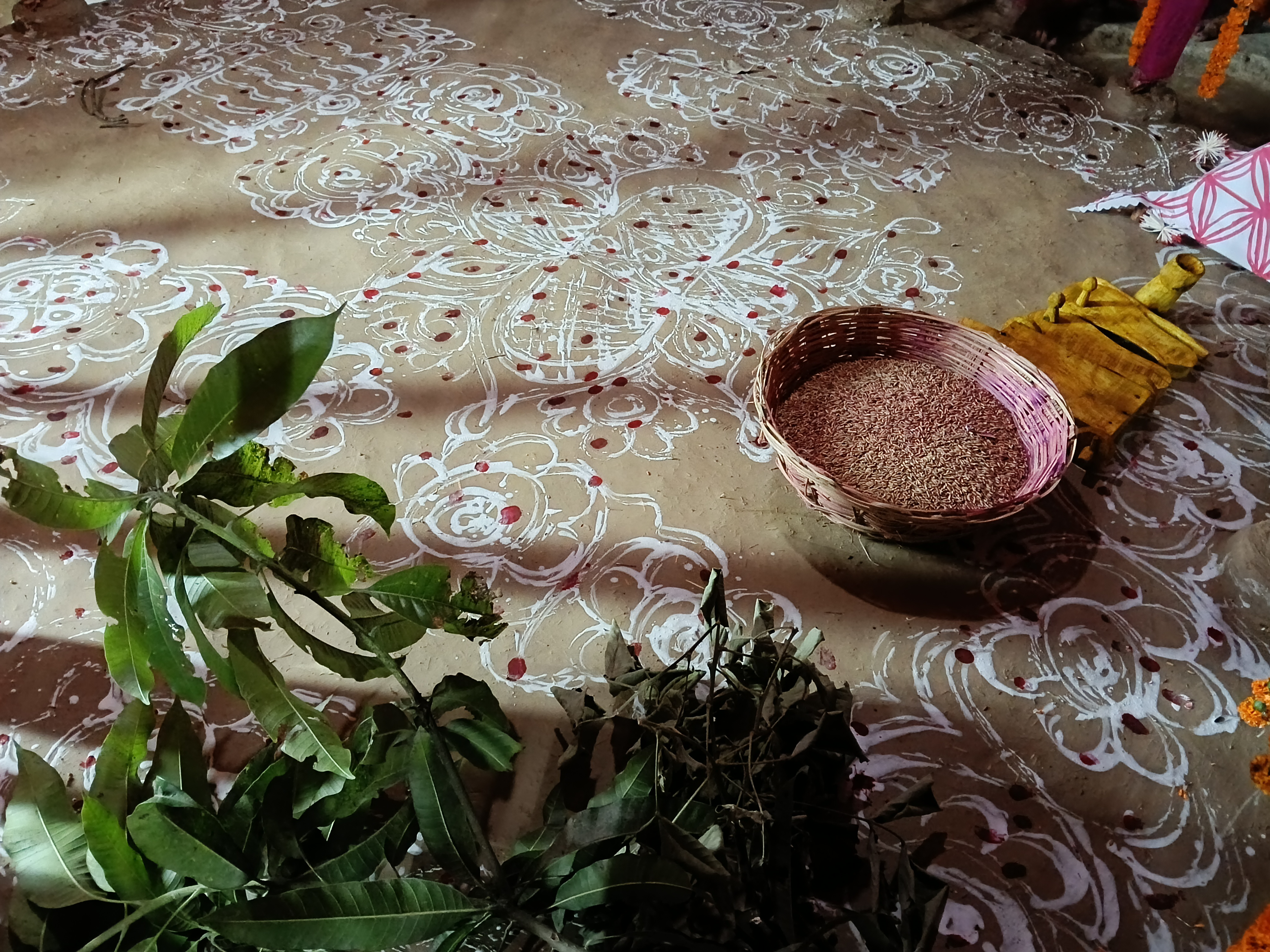
Drawings of Aripan on the ground of a marwa (mandap)

== Description ==
The Ramayana refers to a legendary marwa in Mithila, where Lord Rama and Goddess Sita were mutually married. According to the text, a marwa is defined as a small, well-decorated, thatched-roofed cottage constructed for the sacred rituals such as the Upanayan ceremony and weddings.

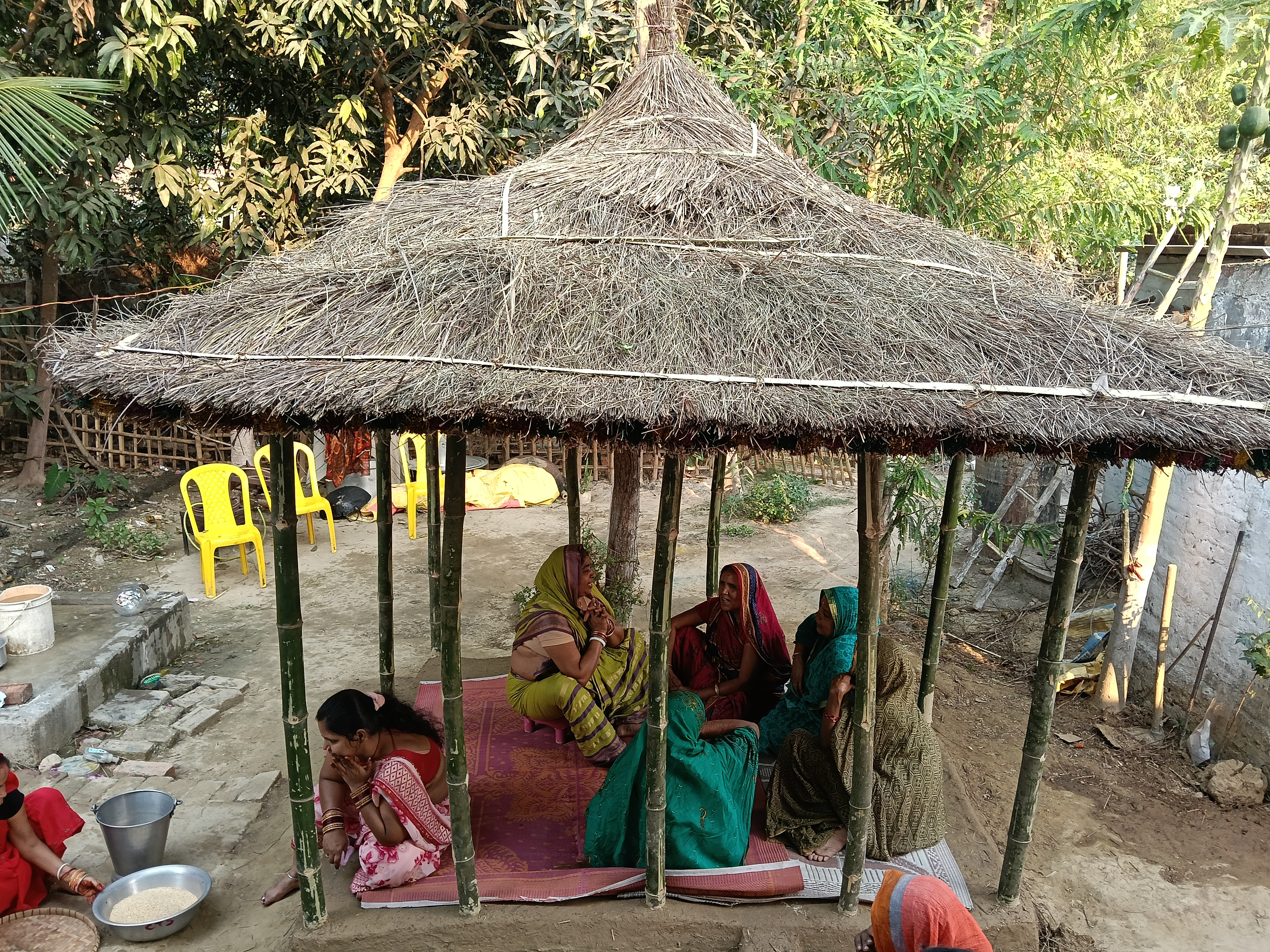
Thatched roof of a marwa

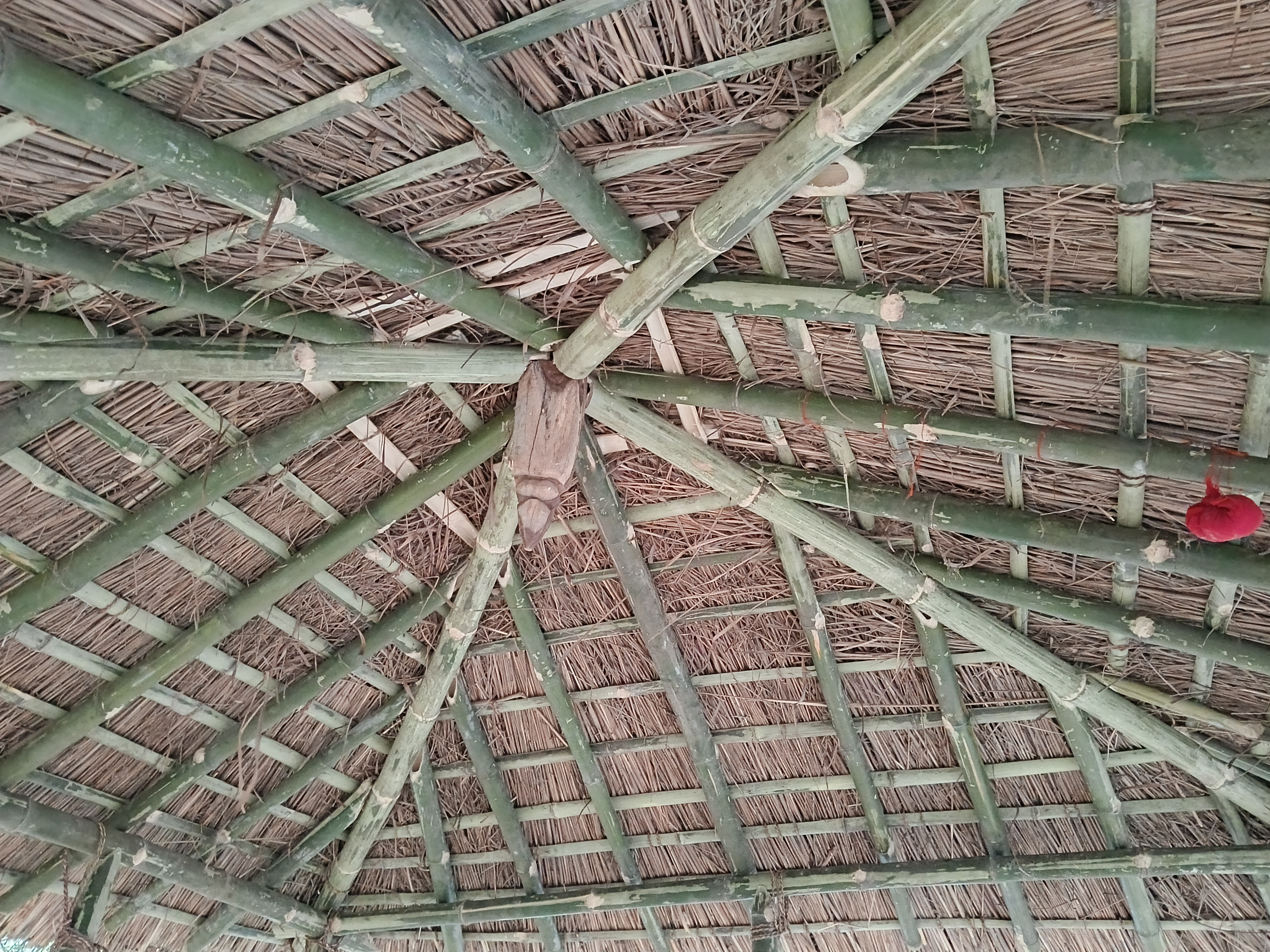
View of a marwa's roof from inner side

In the tradition of Maithil Upanayana, the rituals of the upanayana also known as Janeu Sanskar are conducted on a marwa. On the upanayana day, a havan yagya is conducted on the floor of the marwa.

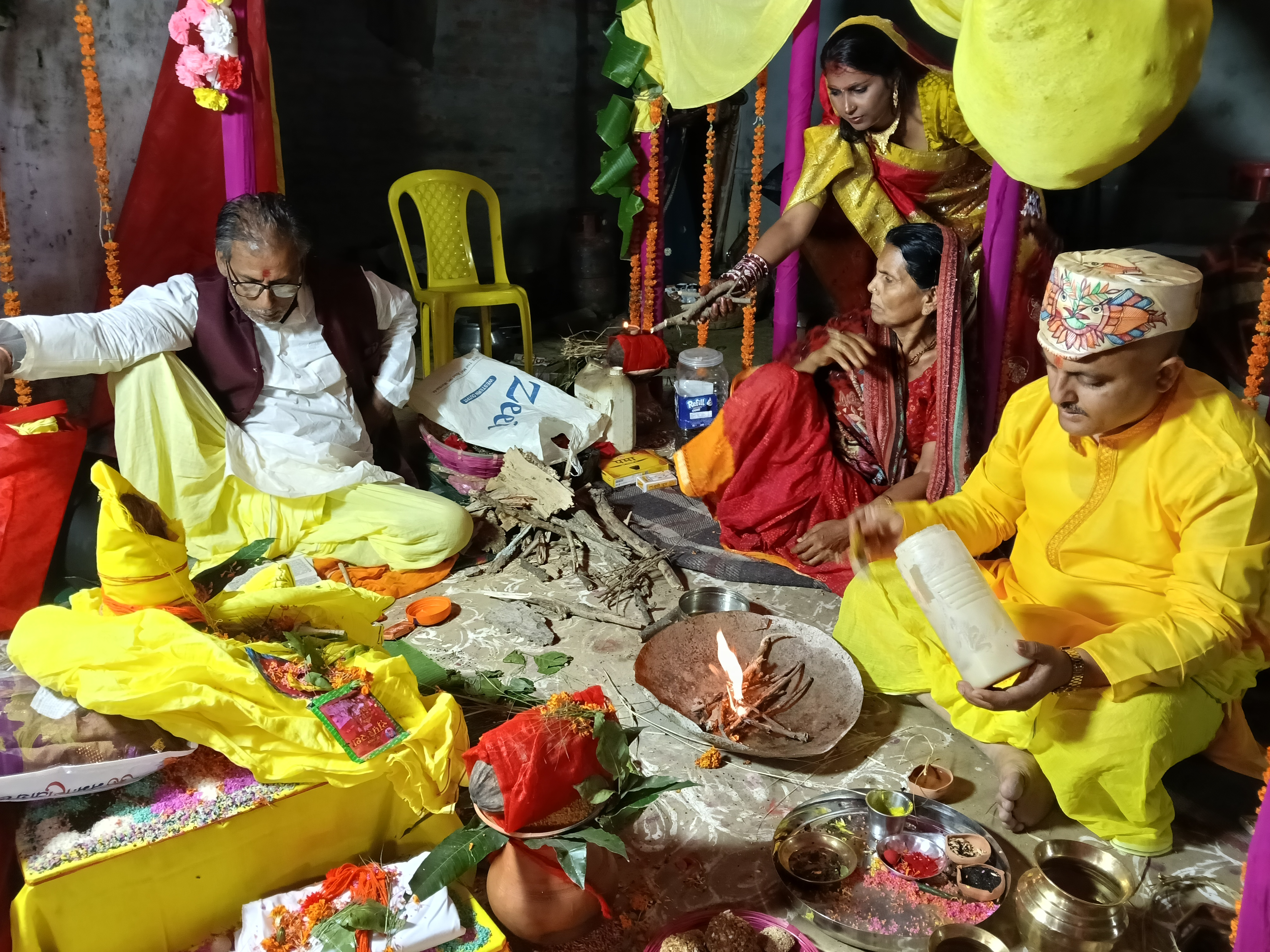
View of an Ekadashi Jag (Yajna) conducted on a Marwa built for Maithil Upanayan

During a marriage ceremony of a Maithil couple, the marwa (mandap) for marriage rituals is constructed at the courtyard of the bride's place (house). Within the marwa, a vedi is constructed, around which a handful of 'lava' is spread.

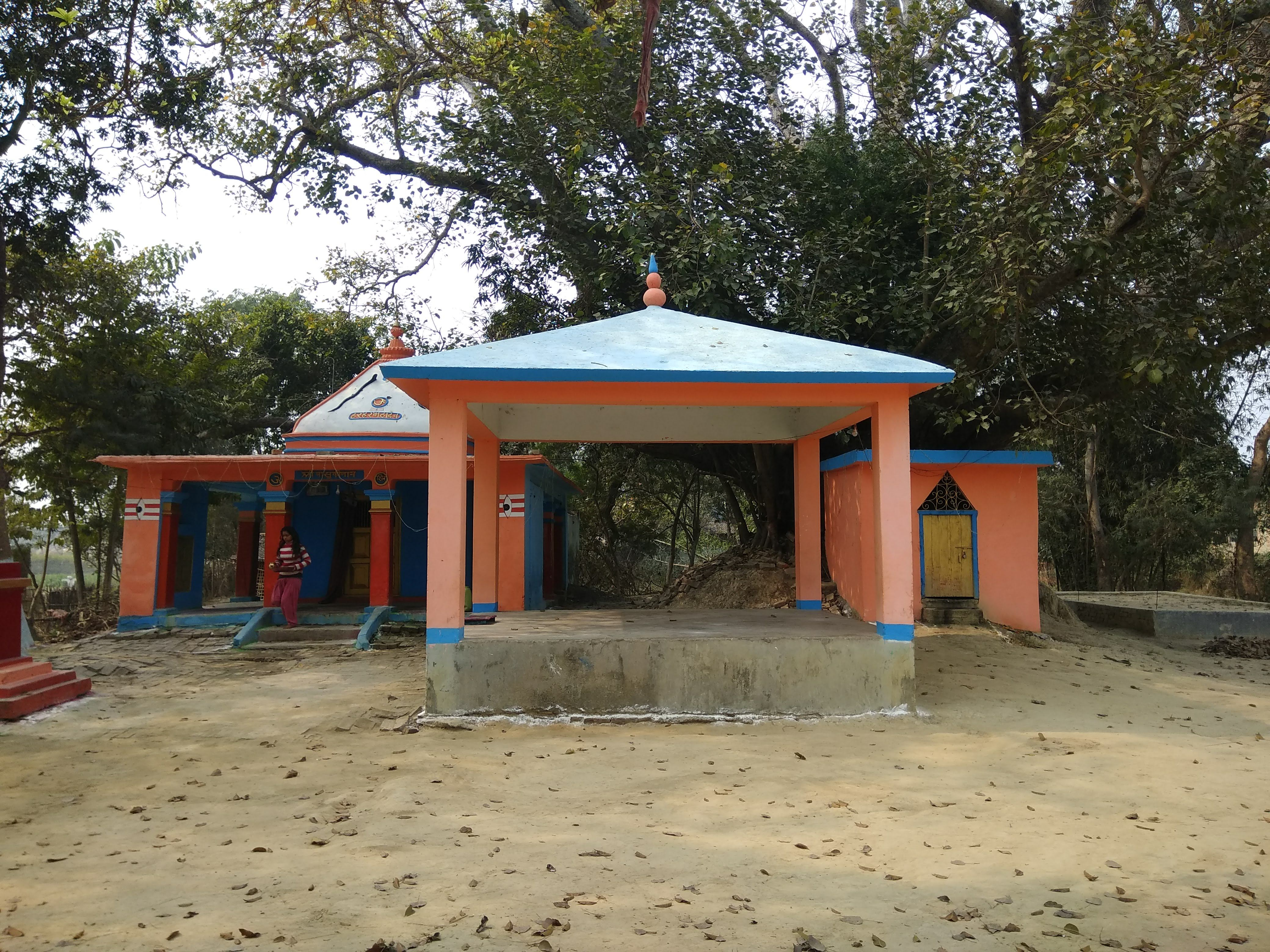
View of a community marwa for religious ceremonies purpose at the campus of the Basuki Nath Mahadev Mandir

== Some legendary marwas ==
In the region of Mithila, there are some legendary marwas associated with Ramayana, etc. According to legend, the marriage between Lord Rama and Goddess Sita in Ramayana was conducted at a marwa (mandap). At the outskirts near Rani Bazar of the Janakpur city, there is a place known as Manimandapa believed to the location of the original marwa (Vivah Mandap), where the divine couple were married mutually.

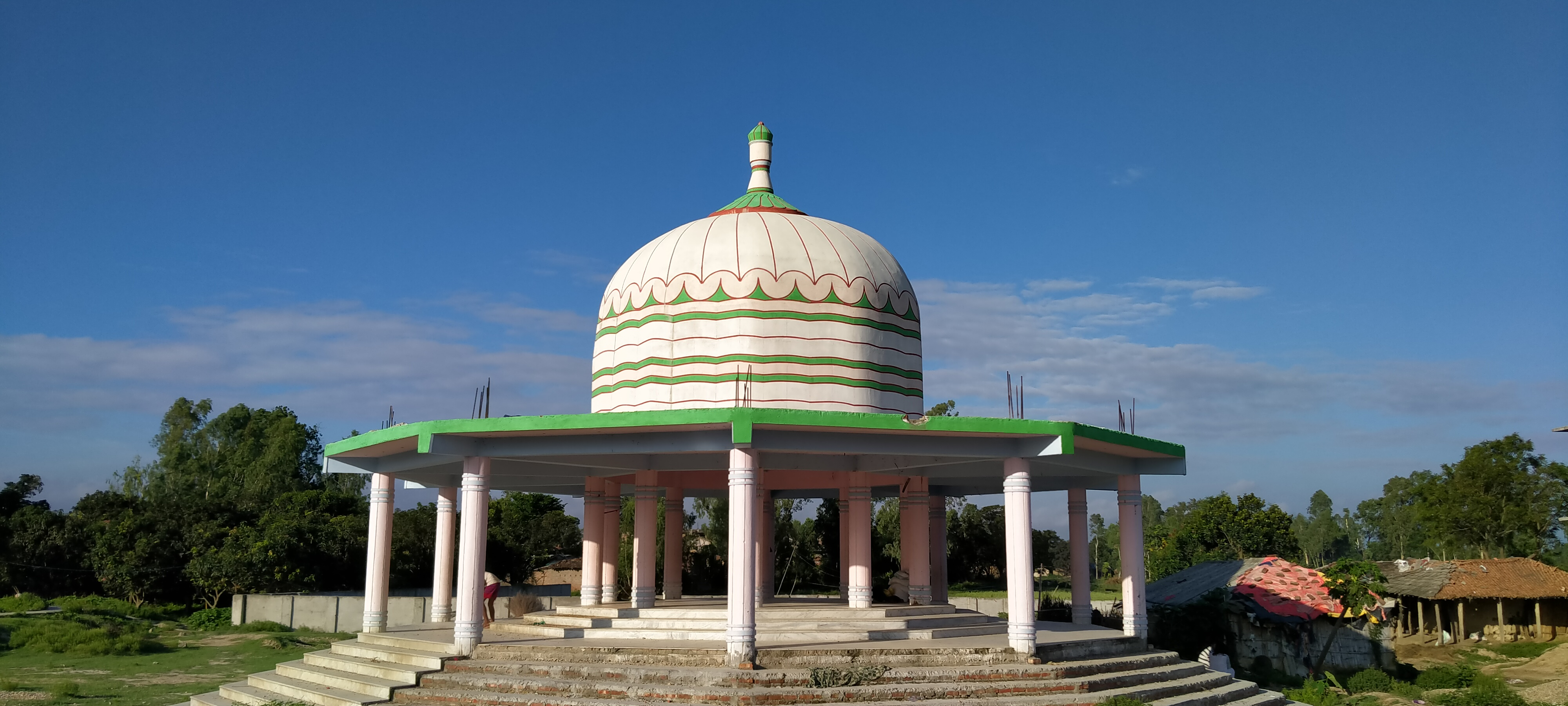
View of the concrete Mandap built at the site believed to be the original Manimandapa Marwa, where Lord Rama and Goddess Sita were married after the legendary Sita Svayamvara competition in Mithila

Similarly in the city of Janakpur, adjacent to the Janaki Mandir, there is a magnificent marwa known as Ram Janaki Vivah Mandap. It was constructed to make the legacy of Ram Janaki Vivah (marriage of Lord Rama and Goddess Sita) memorable.

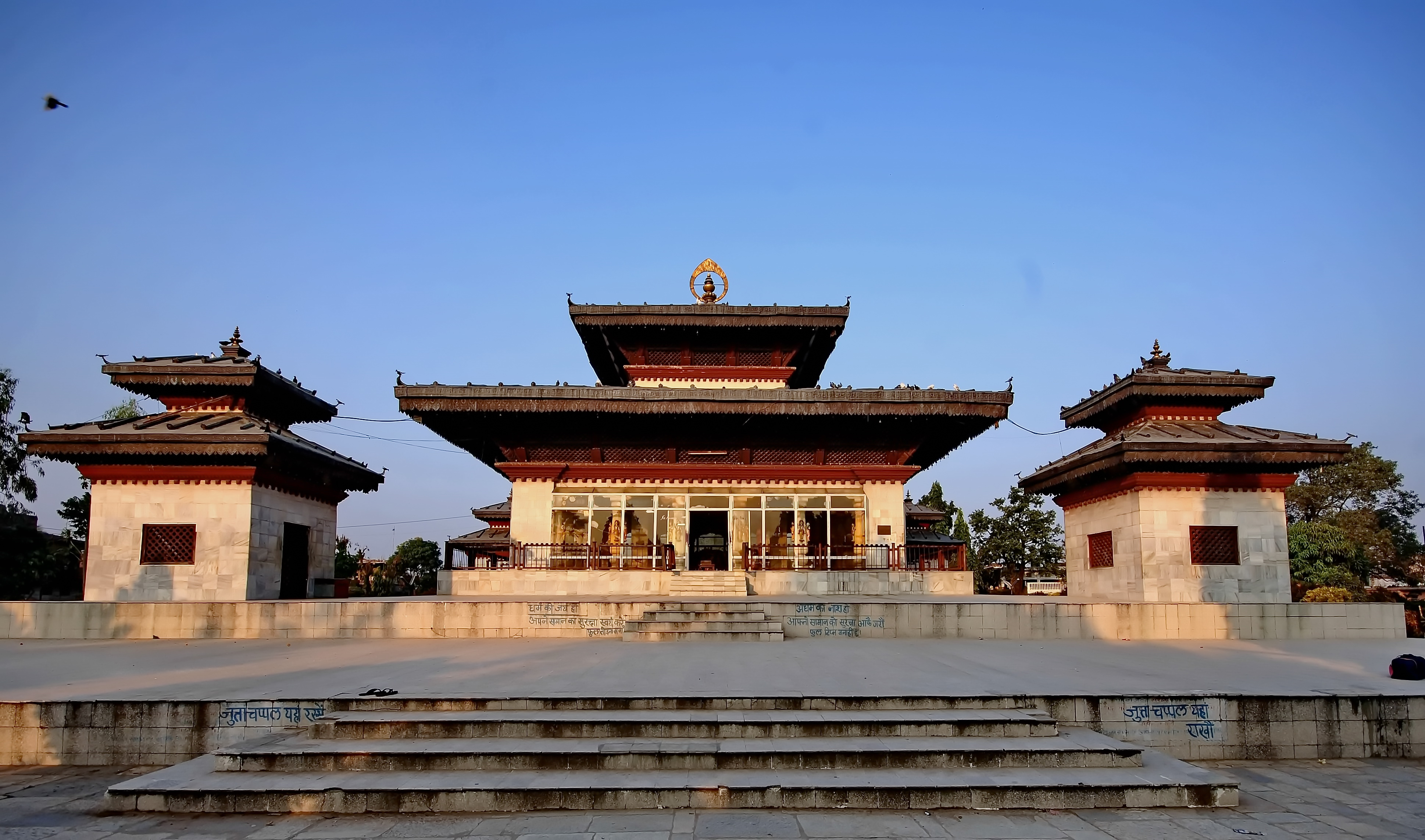
View of the magnificent Ram Janaki Vivah Mandap in Janakpur

Recently in the current year 2026, a temporary wooden mandap called Shree Sitaram Mandapam was constructed at the legendary place of the Punaura Dham believed to be the manifestation (birth) place in the Sitamarhi district of the region. In the mandap, the ancient idols of Goddess Sita and Lord Rama from the ancient temple of Goddess Sita at the Punaura Dham were shifted. The mandap has been designated as the temporary temple of the Goddess Sita in the premises of Punaura Dham until the new grand temple Janaki Janmsthali Mandir is being constructed in the campus.
