= New Age Economy =

Economic development initiative in Bihar, India

- Emblem of Bihar

Classification
- Economic development initiative: Government of Bihar

Period
- Five years
- Occasion: First cabinet meeting of Bihar Government (2025)

Press release presentation
- By: Chief secretary Pratyaya Amrit
- Venue: Bihar Legislative Assembly
- Announcement date: 25 November 2025

New Age Economy refers to the ambitious initiative of the Bihar Government announced at the first cabinet meeting after the formation of the new government (2025) in the state of Bihar led by the chief minister Nitish Kumar. The ambitious initiative of the "New Age Economy" was announced on 25 November 2025 by the chief minister Nitish Kumar. Its major objective is generation of employment in the state of Bihar. It will be based on technology and service-based innovation. The government has started fast-tracking efforts for expansion of industries and subsequently creation of maximum employment opportunities in the state. The state government is aiming to establish Bihar as a ‘Global Backend Hub’ as well as ‘Global Workplace’ with this New Age Economy initiative in the next five years.

== Background ==
The state of Bihar has been transferred into a category of backward state in India since the independence of the country. The major factories, jute and sugar mills, etc were shut down in this period which led unemployment in the state of Bihar. The people of Bihar gradually started migrating from their native state to the other metropolitan cities in the country in search of employment for their livelihood. These migrations further pushed the region of Bihar towards more backward conditions. The labour class people of the state were obliged to move in other states of the country for employment and their livelihood. The labours of Bihar were not treated in right manner there in other states. They were badly behaved by the local people of the other states. The term Bihari used for the people of Bihar gradually became pejorative term in the other part of the country. It was pejoratively used in the other states by the local people there towards the people of Bihar. In the last three to four decades, the labours of Bihar have suffered a lot in the other part of country by the locals there. In the last assembly election 2025 in Bihar, the pride of Bihari become a major issue in the election. All political parties started committing for employment and jobs creation in the native state after formation of their governments in the state.

The initiative of the "New Age Economy" in Bihar is seen as the first step towards the fulfillment of the commitment promised by the National Democratic Alliance during the election campaigns. In the election campaigns, the National Democratic Alliance promised the people of the state to provide employment and jobs to 1 crore youths in Bihar after their government formation.

== Description ==
The Government of Bihar has proposed to establish Bihar as the tech-hub in the eastern India by the initiative of the new-age economy in the state. In the proposals of the initiative, the government has aimed to establish a defence corridor, semiconductor manufacturing park, global capability centres, and a mega tech city or Fintech city in the state of Bihar. Similarly, 11 satellite townships have been planned to be developed around the nine divisional headquarters, the Sonepur town and the Sitamarhi district of the state in the first phase of the initiative under the proposal of the urban development and housing department of the Bihar Government. In the Sitamarhi district of the Mithila region, a new satellite and greenfield township city having name Sitapuram around the sacred teertha Punaura Dham has been proposed.

The government is also seeking for reopening of nine closed sugar mills and establishment of 25 new mills in the region of the state for industrial development. Similarly, in the sector of IT and artificial intelligence, the government has proposed an initiative called Bihar AI Mission. The mission is expected to establish the state as an advanced player in the field of artificial intelligence in the country. In the first cabinet meeting, the government has approved four proposals of the industries department related to the establishment of a global bank hub, a global workplace, fresh support to startups and artificial intelligence uses.

Similarly, the government has decided to promote startups in the state by national and international players aligned with the strategy of new-age economy initiative by the government.

== Planning and recommendation committees ==
For implementation of the initiative "New Age Economy", some high-level committees are planned to be constituted by the government. Most of the committees will be headed by the chief secretary of the state government. The members of these committees will be comprised by national and international experts in their field. The committees will submit its recommendations by the help of its national and international expert members.

The major separate committees to be formed will be related to industries department, urban development and housing department, startups department and IT sector and artificial intelligence, etc.
