= Shree Sitaram Mandapam =

Wooden temple of Goddess Sita at Punaura Dham

- श्री सीताराम मंडपम

Religion
- Affiliation: Hinduism
- District: Sitamarhi
- Deity: Goddess Sita and Lord Rama

Location
- Location: Punaura Dham, Sitapuram
- State: Bihar
- Country: India

Architecture
- Type: Wooden
- Established: 8 August 2026

The Shree Sitaram Mandapam (Maithili: श्री सीताराम मंडपम) is a newly built Hindu temple dedicated to Goddess Sita along with Lord Rama in the Mithila region of Bihar in India. It is a wooden temple constructed at the legendary site Punaura Dham in Sitamarhi. It was inaugurated on 8 August 2026 by the chief minister Samrat Choudhary. It is built for temporary period, with the purpose of shifting the idols of Goddess Sita and Lord Rama from the ancient temple of the Punaura Dham, until the completion of the proposed and underconstruction grand temple of the Janaki Janmsthali Mandir at the premises.

On 8 August 2026, the Chief Minister Samrat Choudhary performed Vedic chants and worshiped Maa Janaki with full rituals at the ancient Punaura Dham temple, the birthplace of Mata Janaki. After that, he installed the idols of the Goddess Sita and Lord Rama from the older temple to the newly constructed temporary wooden mandapam in the temple complex. During the ceremony, he wished for the peace and prosperity of the state, from the deities.
