= Mahsaul urf Rampur Lachmi =

Village in Bihar, India

- Village
- Location within Bihar Location within India
- Coordinates: 26°34′47″N 85°31′40″E
- Country: India
- State: Bihar
- District: Sitamarhi
- Block: Dumra

Government
  - Type: Sarpanch

Area
  - Total: 4.08 km^{2} (1.58 sq mi)
- Elevation: 69 m (226 ft)

Population (2011)
  - Total: 33,196
  - Density: 8,140/km^{2} (21,100/sq mi)

Languages
  - Common: Maithili, Hindi
- Time zone: UTC+5:30 (IST)
- PIN: 843301
- STD code: 06226
- Vehicle registration: BR-30

Mahsaul urf Rampur Lachmi is a village of Bihar, India. It is located in the outskirts of Sitamarhi, the administrative center of Sitamarhi District. At the 2011 census, it had a population of 33,196.

== Geography ==
Mahsaul urf Rampur Lachmi is located to the east of Nahar waterway, near India's northern border with Nepal. The village covers an area of 408 hectares.

== Demographics ==
In the 2011 Census, Mahsaul urf Rampur Lachmi recorded a population of 33,196, comprised 17,563 males and 15,633 females. The working demographic constituted 29.54% of the total population. The average literacy rate stood at 45.73%, with 8,856 of the male residents and 6,325 of the female residents being literate.
