= Sitapuram =

Proposed city in Mithila

Sitapuram Punaura Dham
- City
- Sitapuram
- Etymology: The holy city of Goddess Sita
- Interactive map of Sitapuram
- Country: India
- State: Bihar
- Region: Mithila
- District: Sitamarhi district
- Named for: Goddess Sita
- Demonym: Maithils

Sitapuram is a proposed and planned city in the Sitamarhi district of the Mithila region in the state of Bihar in India. The proposed city of Sitapuram will be developed around the legendary Hindu shrine Punaura Dham near the city of Sitamarhi. It will be a world-class spiritual city dedicated to Goddess Sita of Ramayana. The new proposed city named Sitapuram will be developed to become a hub for tourism in the Mithila region. It is expected that the proposed city will increase employment in the region. The proposed city of Sitapuram will attract domestic as well as foreign tourists, which will open a new door for tourism in the Mithila region.

== Description ==
The proposed city of Sitapuram in Mithila will be developed similar to the city of Ayodhya in Uttar Pradesh. Just as the grand temple of Lord Rama in Ayodhya is the biggest identity of Uttar Pradesh, in the same way Mother Janaki's new proposed city Sitapuram will be developed to become the biggest identity of the Mithila region in the state of Bihar. The proposed grand Janaki Janmasthali Mandir at Punaura Dham is going to be the main attraction centre of the proposed city.

During the Bihar Assembly Election 2025, the National Democratic Alliance (NDA) in its election manifesto known as Sankalp Patra 2025, promised the people of Mithila for creation and development of the new proposed city of Sitapuram around the sacred Punaura Dham. After the formation of the NDA's government led by the chief minister Nitish Kumar in Bihar, the cabinet of the Nitish government on 25 November 2025, took the decision to develop the proposed city of Sitapuram in the Sitamarhi district as a new satellite and greenfield township.

== Planning ==
The proposed city of Sitapuram has been selected as one of the major projects in the ambitious initiative known as "New Age Economy" initiated by the Government of Bihar in India. It is planned to be connected with three new expressways. It is in progress to connect three new expressways together. The three new expressways are Ram-Janaki Path Expressway, Gorakhpur-Siliguri Expressway and Raxaul-Haldia Expressway. The Ram - Janaki Path Expressway between Ayodhya to Sitapuram will be four lines highway. Apart from the roadways, the city is also planned to be connected by Indian railways. A new railway station is planned to be constructed in the city of Sitapuram. It will be called as Punaura Dham Railway Station. It will be constructed, near the holy shrine Punaura Dham, on the proposed 51 kilometres new railway line from Sitamarhi via Sheohar to Motihari.

The city of Sitapuram will be equipped with modern facilities. The citizens of the proposed city and pilgrims from outside will get modern facilities of big shopping malls, hotels and parks etc.

== Area of the planned city ==
The proposed city of Sitapuram consists of core and special areas. According to the district sub-registrar Pankaj Kumar Basak of the district, 32 revenue villages of Dumra and Riga blocks have been marked as core and special areas under the Sitapuram township project.

The Government of Bihar has presently banned the sale, registry and new construction of land in the core areas marked for the planned Sitapuram township project. The ban is extended till 30 June 2027.
