= Naranga, Bihar =

Naranga
- Village
- Location in Bihar, India
- Coordinates: 26.789200°N 85.648245°E
- Country: India
- State: Bihar
- District: Sitamarhi

Area
  - Total: 4.17 km^{2} (1.61 sq mi)
- Elevation: 56 m (184 ft)

Population (2011)
  - Total: 25,366
  - Density: 6,080/km^{2} (15,800/sq mi)

Languages
  - Official: Maithili, Hindi
- Time zone: UTC+5:30 (IST)
- PIN: 843324
- ISO 3166 code: IN-BR
- Vehicle registration: BR-30 (Sitamarhi Urban)
- Lok Sabha constituency: Sitamarhi
- Vidhan Sabha constituency: Parihar (Vidhan Sabha constituency)
- Website: narangabihar.blogspot.com

Naranga is a developing village and gram panchayat in Parihar (Vidhan Sabha constituency), Sitamarhi district, Bihar, India.

== Language And Culture ==
Bajjika dialect and Hindi is spoken by the people here. A group of women sings on many occasions like marriage, Janeu, etc.

== Education ==
In Naranga there are many private and public schools. The family has to pay fees in private schools. Poor families without paying any fees send their children to public schools.

- Aangan Wadi – 1- to 5-year-olds go to Aangan Wadi. They eat rice, lentils and soybeans, as well as basic education is imparted.
- High school – It is situated 1 km north of RAMANA CHOWK.

== Religion ==
Hindu and Muslim lives here with mankind and humanity. Durga Mandir at Naranga Bazaar, Mahadev Math, and many temples are here for Hindus. One Mosque for Muslims is also here.

== Festivals ==
- Makar Sankranti
- Vasant Panchami
- Holi
- Eid-ul-Fitr
- Eid-ul-Adha
- Muharram
- Ram Navami
- Rakshabandhan
- Teej
- Maha Shivaratri
- Durga Puja
- Diwali
- Chhath

and several other local festivals as well.

== Connectivity ==
Parwaha lalbandi road connects the area to National Highway 104 (India) in the south and Nepal in the north.

Naranga dostiya road connects the area to National Highway 77 (India).

The nearest railway station is Sitamarhi railway station.

The nearest airport to Naranga is the Darbhanga Airport which is about 79 kilometres (49 mi) distance.

== Politics ==
Naranga plays a very important role in elections. Naranga is sub-divided into two Panchayat.

- Naranga Uttari
- Naranga Dakshini

List of Mukhiya of Naranga Uttari

Name	Year
Singheshwar Rai	1990–2001
Bhuvneshwar Thakur	2001–2003
Narendra Prasad	2003–2006
Rameshwar Ram	2006–2011
Ravishankar Paswan	2011 – 27 June 2016
Narendra Prasad	27 June 2016 – 2021
