= Talkhapur =

- town
- Country: India
- State: Bihar
- District: Sitamarhi

Population
  - Total: 15,961

Languages
  - Official: Maithili, Hindi
- Time zone: UTC+5:30 (IST)

Talkhapur is a town in Sitamarhi district in Bihar, India. The population of the town is 15,961. The sex ratio is 53% male and 47% female. The literacy rate is 57% in males and 39% in females.
