= Betaha =

Village in Bihar, India

Coordinates: 26°44′5.2″N 85°41′31.9″E

Betaha is a village of Parihar block in Sitamarhi district of Bihar, India. In the 2020 census of India it had a population of nearly 10,000 people.
