= Hariharnath Mahadev Mandir =

Lord Shiva temple in Mithila

Religion
- Affiliation: Hinduism
- Deity: Shiva

Location
- Location: Hariharpur village, Kumahara Vishanpur panchayat, Dumra block, Sitamarhi district
- State: Bihar
- Country: India

Hariharnath Mahadev Mandir (Maithili: हरिहरनाथ महादेव मंदिर) is a Hindu temple dedicated to Shiva in Bihar, India. It is located in Hariharpur village, Kumahara Vishanpur panchayat, Dumra block of Sitamarhi district. It was associated with the Ramayana. During the festival of Shravan Sombari, devotees flock to the temple to perform Jalabhisheka.
