= Pundakeshwar Mahadev Mandir =

Lord Shiva temple in Mithila established by Pundrika Rishi

- पुंडकेश्वर महादेव मंदिर

Religion
- Affiliation: Hinduism
- District: Sitamarhi district
- Deity: Lord Shiva

Location
- Location: Pundrik Ashram, Pundrik Rishi Kshetra, Sitamarhi
- State: Bihar
- Country: India
- Interactive map of Pundakeshwar Mahadev Mandir
- Coordinates: 26.5803238°N 85.4575493°E

Architecture
- Founder: Pundrik Rishi
- Established: Treta Yuga

The Pundakeshwar Mahadev Mandir (Maithili: पुंडकेश्वर महादेव मंदिर) is a legendary temple of Lord Shiva at the premises of the Pundrik Ashram in the Mithila region of the Indian subcontinent. It is situated at the Punaura Dham in the Sitamarhi district of Bihar in India. The legendary temple is believed to be established by the Vedic Rishi Pundrika in Mithila. He was a great devotee of Lord Shiva in Mithila. The location of the temple premises is known as Pundrik Rishi Kshetra. The Shiva Baraat ceremony of the temple is a popular festival celebrated at the premises of the temple.

== Etymology ==
The Pundakeshwar Mahadev Mandir is attributed to the Vedic sage Pundrik. The term Pundakeshwar is formed by the combination of the two Indic terms Pundrik and Ishwar. Pundrik is the name of the founder Rishi of the temple and the second term Ishwar signifies to the Lord Shiva. Thus the combined term Pundakeshwar means Lord of Pundrik.

== Description ==
The temple of Pundakeshwar Mahadev is at a distance of 6 kilometres in the west from the Sitamarhi Railway Station. It is situated on the western bank of the Pundrik Sarovar at the premises of the Pundrik Rishi Kshetra. The Hindu adherents have immense faith in this temple. They believe that performing the sacred ritual Jalabhisheka and Rudrabhisheka on the Pundakeshwar Mahadev Shivalinga at the temple fullfill the desired results wished. The devotees coming to the temple, take the holy water from the Pundrik Sarovar and perform Jalabhisheka on the Shivalinga.

The temple is looked after by a Peethadhishwar. The present Peethadhishwar of the temple is Swami Umeshanandan Ji Maharaj.

== History ==
According to the local folklore, there was a divine Shiva temple on this holy land, established during the penance of the Pundrik Rishi. It is said that later the legendary temple of Pundakeshwar Mahadev was destroyed during some earthquakes and other natural calamities in the region. The present temple was established by a teacher couple at their own expenses. It was constructed in the year 2012. On 30 August 2012, the Shivalinga of the Pundakeshwar Mahadev was installed at the temple through a ritualistic ceremony of Pran Pratishtha.

In the year 2022, the foundation of a grand Yajnashala was laid down at the premises of the temple in the presence of several Shadu-Saints.

== Legend ==
According to the legend, the Shivalinga of the Shiva temple was established by the spiritual penance of Pundrik Rishi. The Hindu ascetics believe that it was energized by the continuous penance of the sage Pundrik. It is believed that the sage Pundrik in the ancient times performed a very long and continuous penance devoted to Lord Shiva here. Similarly, there is a belief among the Hindu adherents that Lord Shiva comes here every day to meet Mahadevi.
