= Dumari Kalan =

Dumari Kalan (Village ID 219056) is a village in the Sitamarhi district of Bihar state, India. Dumri Kalan Urf Madhuban Jadu village is located in Majorganj Tehsil of Sitamarhi district in Bihar, India. It is situated 5 km away from sub-district headquarter Majorganj and 30 km away from district headquarter Sitamarhi. As per 2009 stats, Dumari Kala is the gram panchayat of Dumri Kalan Urf Madhuban Jadu village. The total geographical area of village is 1107 hectares. Sitamarhi is nearest town to Dumri Kalan Urf Madhuban Jadu which is approximately 36 km away. According to the 2011 census it has a population of 10667 living in 2651 households.
