= Rampur Parori =

Native village in Gujarat, India

Rampur Parori is a native village in Dumra, Sitamarhi, India.
