= Industrial ruins in Mithila region =

Ruins of industrial estate in Mithila

- The remains of the destroyed industrial estate in Mithila region

Declination of industrial development in the Mithila region of Bihar

Industrial ruins in Mithila region are the remains of the destroyed and decaying older factories and industrial estates of the region in the state of Bihar in India.

== Description ==
There were several sugar mills, jute mills and paper mills, etc in the Mithila region of Bihar three to four decades ago. During the regime of Darbhanga Raj, several industries of sugar mills, jute mills, textiles mills and papers mills were established in the Mithila region at different locations.

=== Sakri Sugar Mill ===
Sakri Sugar Mill was established at Sakri village of the Pandaul block in the Madhubani district of the Mithila region in Bihar. It was shut down in the year 1997. Later it was converted into the industrial ruins. Due to the shut down of the sugar mill more than 1100 employees lost their jobs.

=== Lohat Sugar Mill ===
The Lohat Sugar Mill was established in 1914 AD under the Darbhanga Sugar Company. It is located at Lohat village in the Pandaul block of the Madhubani district in the Mithila region of Bihar. It is said that the mill was the symbol of industrial revolution in the region. The mill got shut down in the year 1996. Later due to the ignorance of the management of the company, it gradually converted into the industrial ruins.

=== Raiyam Sugar Mill ===
Raiyam Sugar Mill was established during the period of British rule in the subcontinent. It was established by the Maharaja of Darbhanga Raj to facilitate employment opportunities to the people of the region. It was helpful in strengthening the economic conditions of the farmers in the region. It led to the increment of the income of the farmers. But later due to the acquisition of the mill by the government and some internal corruptions, the mill got completely shut down in the year 1995. The mill gradually converted into the industrial ruins. Later the ruins was sold by the government during the regime of the chief minister Nitish Kumar in Bihar. It was sold in the hand of Delhi based company named as Shree Tirhut Industries Ltd.

=== Banmanki Sugar Mill ===
According to the local leader cum former minister Krishna Kumar Rishi, the Banmanki Sugar Mill was established in the year 1956 with name Purnia Co-operative Sugar Factory Ltd. In the year 1977, it was handover to the Bihar Sugar Mill Corporation by the then Governor of Bihar. Later due to the ignorance by the government, the sugar mill got closed three decades ago. The mill has been converted into the industrial ruins.

=== Riga Sugar Mill ===
The Riga Sugar Mill was established in the year 1933 AD. It was established at Riga village of the Sitamarhi district in the Mithila region of Bihar by the Belsund Sugar & Industries Limited under British management. The company run for a long time but later in the year 2020, the company got shut down.

=== Motipur Sugar Mill ===
The Motipur Sugar Mill was established on 8 February 1934 in the of Motipur Sugar Factory Limited at Motipur town in the Muzaffarpur district of the Mithila region in Bihar. The sugar mill was shut down in the year 2011.

=== Samastipur Sugar Mill ===
Samastipur Sugar Mill was established in the year 1917 AD during the period of British rule in India. It was established in the name of Veda Sadar Land Company and regulated by the British government.

=== Ashok Paper Mill ===
Ashok Paper Mill was established in the 1956 by the Maharaja of Darbhanga Raj. It was established at Rameshwar Nagar in Hayaghat block of Darbhanga district in the Mithila region of Bihar. It is spread over 385 acres of land. It started production in the year 1975. Due to the political differences, it was shut down in the year 1982. After that the paper mill gradually converted into the industrial ruins.

=== Samastipur Paper Mill ===
Samastipur Paper Mill was established by Ram Vinod Sharma on 7 July 1954. It was started in the name of Thakur Paper Mill. The government owned share of 49 percentage of the stake in the company. Due to the opposition between the management of the company and the Left-wing labour union, it was first time shut down in the year 1972. After that in the year 1979, it was completely locked. Then it gradually converted into the industrial ruins.

== List of the industrial ruins ==
1. Ashok Paper Mill, Darbhanga
2. Samastipur Paper Mill
3. Sakari Sugar Mill
4. Raiyam Sugar Mill
5. Lohat Sugar Mill
6. Motipur Sugar Mill
7. Banmanki Sugar Mill, Purnia
8. Riga Sugar Mill, Sitamarhi
9. Samastipur Sugar Mill
10. Rameshwar Jute Mill, Muktapur, Samastipur
11. National Jute Manufacturing Corporation Mill, Katihar
12. Sunbio Manufacturing Limited, Katihar
13. Kishanganj Jute Mill
14. Purnia Jute Mill
15. Araria Jute Mill
