= Tirhut Township =

Proposed city in the Mithila region

Tirhut Township Tirhut Satellite Township
- Proposed city
- Country: India
- State: Bihar
- Region: Mithila region
- Division: Tirhut Division
- District: Muzaffarpur
- Named for: Tirhut

Tirhut Township is a proposed greenfield satellite township near the present city of Muzaffarpur in the Mithila region of Bihar in India. It is among the 12 proposed satellite townships in state of Bihar in India. It was proposed by the Urban Development and Housing Department of the Government of Bihar. A total of 68 villages have been included in the core and special areas of the proposed township. The proposed township is named after the historical name Tirhut of the Mithila region in Bihar. The Government of Bihar has proposed to establish a satellite township in each division of the state. The Tirhut Township is the part of the Tirhut division in the state. In the same division, one more satellite township called Sitapuram is being developed near the city of Sitamarhi.

== Geography ==
The core area of the proposed Tirhut Township will be 1191 acres. It includes 9 villages of the Madwan and Kudhani blocks in the Muzaffarpur district. Among the 9 villages, 8 are included from the Madwan block and 1 from the Kudhani block. The 8 villages of the Madwan block are Madwan Khurd, Vishunpur Gobind, Bhatouna, Khalilpur, Arizpur, Makdumpur Kodana, Borbara and Mansoorpur Chamrua. Similarly from the Kudhani block, the only one village called Motha alias Chak Haroon is included.
