= Janaki Janmasthali Mandir =

Proposed Hindu temple

- Janaki Dham

Religion
- Affiliation: Hinduism
- District: Sitamarhi district
- Deity: Sita
- Festival: Janaki Navami
- Governing body: Trust, Shree Janaki Janmabhoomi Punauradham Mandir Nyas Samiti

Location
- Location: Punauradham, Sitapuram, Sitamarhi, Mithila
- State: Bihar
- Country: India
- Interactive map of Janaki Janmasthali Mandir
- Coordinates: 26.5865945°N 85.4658158°E

Janaki Janmasthali Mandir or Maa Janaki Janmbhoomi Mandir or Mata Sita Mandir or Mata Janaki Mandir is a proposed grand temple of the Hindu goddess Sita in the Mithila region at a site of the Punaura Dham in the Sitamarhi district of the Tirhut division in the Bihar state of India. The comprehensive development of the grand proposed temple of Goddess Sita at Punaura Dham can provide global recognition to the Mithila region of Bihar. In Hinduism the site is considered the place where Sita was found closed in a box from a farm field while the King Janaka was ploughing the farm field. Ramayana Research Council has also proposed the construction of the Tallest Statue of Mata Sita at Raghopur Bakhri village in the Sitamarhi district, which is near the proposed site at Punauradham. There is a plan to build Janaki Dham in Sitamarhi on the lines of Ram Mandir in Ayodhya. A campus known as Janaki Dham would be built on 67 acres of land near Punauradham. The foundation stone of the Janaki Janmasthali Mandir was laid by Nitish Kumar, the Chief Minister of Bihar on 13 December 2023 at Punauradham. In 2025 the union home minister Amit Shah said that after the construction of Ram Mandir he is focusing on the construction of the proposed Mata Sita Mandir. On 8 August 2025, he laid the foundation stone for the Janaki Janmasthali Mandir redevelopment project. It is also called as Maa Janaki Temple.

The Union Home Minister Amit Shah described Mother Sita as "the embodiment of an ideal daughter, wife, mother and Rajmata", while performing the bhumi pujan and laying the foundation stone for the grand project of Janaki Janmasthali Mandir. The life story of Mother Sita will be recreated in the form of new constructions and arts dedicated to women power and "Maatri Shakti" in the premises of the temple.

Amit Shah said

"I am telling the people of Mithila that this is not just a temple but the beginning of the rise of Mithila and Bihar."

— Amit Shah, Speech at Punaura Dham

== History ==
Punaura is in the Mithila region, also called the Tirhut or Tirabhukti, with history dating back to the Vedic period (1500-500 BCE) when it was one of the 16 Mahajanapadas of India, covers surrounding areas of Bihar and Nepal.

According to Valmiki' Ramayana, once there was a severe famine in Mithila and the priest there advised the King of Videha, Janaka, to plow the field. When King Janak was ploughing, an earthen pot came out of the ground, in which Mother Sita was in an infant state. The Punaura Dham is believed to be the spot where that earthen pot came out, hence revered as the birthplace of Sita. Since she came out of a furrow when King Janaka was ploughing the land, he adopted her as his daughter and named her Sita, which means “furrow” in Sanskrit and he also gave her the name Janaki, meaning daughter of Janaka.

== Upgrade ==
=== Description ===
In 2025, Government of Bihar announced Rs 882.87 crore plan to redevelop the Punaura Dham, including the construction of a grand Sita Mata temple and pilgrim corridor on the pattern of Ram Janmabhoomi (lit. 'Birthplace of Rama'). In 2024, 50 acre land around the temple was acquired for this purpose at the cost of Rs 120.58 crore. From this budget, Rs 137 crore will be spent on the redeveloping the old Punaura Dham Janki Temple and remaining Rs 728 crore for the development of pilgrimage corridor and religious tourism facilities around the temple which will also entail upgrade of Sita-Vatika, Luv-Kush Vatika, new parikrama (circumambulation) path, kiosks, cafeteria and children's play areas. "Design Associates Inc", a design consultant which designed Ayodhya's Ram Janmabhoomi temple, has been appointed the design consultant for the Punaura Dham upgrade project.

The grand Janaki Janmasthali Mandir will be constructed at Sitakund of Punaura Dham in Sitamarhi. The construction of this temple will be done by the Mahavir Mandir Trust of Patna. The temple has been designed by architect Piyush Sompura. The permission of construction of the proposed temple has been received from the Bihar State Religious Trust Board. Excellent Makrana stone will be used in the construction of the proposed divine temple. On 13 December 2023, Chief Minister Nitish Kumar of Bihar laid the foundation stone for the construction of the grand temple of Mother Sita at Punauradham in Sitamarhi. Many facilities like huge gate, Parikrama Path, Sita Vatika, Luv Kush Vatika, pavilion and parking will also be constructed in the Punauradham. The Government of Bihar has decided to acquire 50 acres of land around the existing temple for construction of a new grand temple at Sitamarhi. According to the Principal Secretary Siddharth, the site would be developed like Tirupati. Similarly according to Kameshwar Chaupal, the present temple was built around 100 years ago which is not in very good condition now. The new grand temple will be built in the line of Ayodhya. On 30 November 2024, the Union Finance Minister Nirmala Sitharaman during her visit in Mithila region announced that we had taken a resolution to build a grand temple of Goddess Janaki at her birthplace like the temple of Ram Mandir in Ayodhya. Similarly on 9 March 2025, the Union Home Minister Amit Shah while addressing a cultural program Shaswata Mithila Mahotsav in Gandhinagar said that a grand temple of Maa Janaki would be built in Mithila soon which would send a message of ideal life to the women power of the entire world.

=== 108 idols ===
It is planned that around a circular lower part 108 idols of Janaki will be displayed and soil from 51 Shakta pithas (pilgrimage shrines) will be used in the temple's construction, which was to start in 2024.

=== Construction ===
There is a 14-acre site on which the statue is planned. Shreebhagwati Sita Tirtha Kshetra Samiti is a committee of the Ramayan Research Council to oversee construction.

On 22 June 2025, the chief minister Nitish Kumar of the Bihar Government released the final design of the proposed grand temple on his social media platforms. The Bihar Government has constituted a trust having nine members dedicated to the construction of the grand temple. The trust is named as Shree Janaki Janmabhoomi Punauradham Mandir Nyas Samiti. The Bihar Government cabinet has already approved a budget of Rs 120 crore for the development of the campus of the temple.

== Connectivity ==
The union home minister Amit Shah of the Government of India has promised to improve the connectivity of the two important and related cities of Sitamarhi and Ayodhya in India for easy connectivity of the two important temples Ram Mandir and Janaki Janmasthali Mandir of the two culturally tied cities in the country. He has proposed a highway called as Sitamarhi-Ayodhya Ramjanaki Path dedicated for the better connectivity between the two cities at cost of Rs 550 crore. Similarly, he also proposed a budget of Rs 5,000 crore for doubling the railway track between the two cities of Sitamarhi and Ayodhya.

== See also ==
- Mithila Madhya Parikrama
- Sitamarhi Dham Parikrama
- Janakpur Dham
- Ram Janmabhoomi
- Krishna Janmasthan Temple Complex
- Parikrama
- Yatra
- Mithila Cultural Museum
- Ramjanaki Math
- Janaki Mandir, Janakpur
