= Bela Bahadurpur =

Bela Bahadurpur is a village in Sitamarhi district of Bihar, India.
