= Haleshwar Sthan =

Haleshwar Sthan, Haleshwarnath Temple
- Location in Bihar

Religion
- Affiliation: Hinduism
- District: Sitamarhi Girmisani
- Deity: Shiva
- Festivals: Shavan, Janki Navami, Vivah Panchami, Durgapuja

Location
- Location: Haleshwar Sthan, Sitamarhi
- State: Bihar
- Coordinates: 26.633885°N 85.484895°E

Architecture
- Type: Vastu Shastra
- Creator: Pragati Gaurav
- Completed: Before 17th century AD

The Haleshwar Sthan is a Hindu pilgrimage site in Sitamarhi in the state of Bihar, India, which has an ancient Hindu temple. It is situated 7 km north-west of Sitamarhi town. The temple is dedicated to Shiva.

As per local belief, King Janaka of Mithila established a shivling here at the beginning of Haleshti Yagna to please Shiva. A temple was built around the shivling in the 17th century and was named Haleshwarnath temple.

Mahavir Mandir Trusts operates a bus service connecting Punaura Dham, Haleshwar Sthan, Panthpakar and Kapileshwar temple, Nepal. The bus starts in the morning and returns in evening to Punaura Dham.
