= Sita Kund =

Pilgrimage site with temple and thermal springs

Punaura Dham, Janki Mandir
- Location in Bihar

Religion
- Affiliation: Hinduism
- District: Sitamarhi
- Deity: Sita
- Festivals: Janki Navami, Vivah Panchami, Durgapuja

Location
- Location: Punaura, Sitamarhi
- State: Bihar
- Coordinates: 26.586453°N 85.466757°E

Architecture
- Type: Vastu Shastra
- Creator: Pragati Gaurav
- Completed: Before 17th century AD

Sita Kund is a Hindu pilgrimage site that honours the birthplace of the goddess, Sita. The Punaura Dham Janki Mandir is a Hindu pilgrimage site in Sitamarhi district, Bihar, which has an ancient Hindu temple. It is situated 5 km west of Sitamarhi City and a popular visitor's attraction.

Punaura Dham Janki Mandir is one of the holiest Hindu temples dedicated to the goddess Sita, located in Sitamarhi, Bihar, India. Million of pilgrims visit the temple every year and most visited religious shrine in North India.

Punaura Dham is about 5 km west of Sitamarhi. Saint Pundrik's Ashram was situated here.

Mahavir Mandir Trusts is named Sri Mahavir Sthan Nyas Samiti (Hindi: श्री महावीरस्थान न्यास समीती) started Sita Rasoi from 27 Jan 2019 at Punaura Dham for those pilgrims who visit the temple from outside of Sitamarhi District.

A daily bus service is operated by Mahavir Mandir Trusts in morning from Punaura Dham to Haleshwar Sthan, Panthpakar and Janakpur Temple Nepal; it returns in evening to Punaura Dham.

== Hot springs ==
Sita Kund is known for its hot springs. Legend has it that Sita, participated in the fire ordeal, Agni Pariksha, and that her body absorbed the fire but she was not harmed. She then transferred this inner heat to the spring water. Each full moon day of Magh, pilgrims visit the hot springs.

== Transportation ==
The place can be easily reached from the Patna Airport, Bus Station, Patna Railway Station. The temple is roughly 150 km from the Patna Junction Railway Station. Bus and taxis are available at Patna, Gulzarbagh, Patliputra and Patna City railway stations.

The place can be easily reached from the adjacent District's Muzaffarpur, Darbhanga, Madhubani and East Champaran.

The temple is just approx. 70 –80 km from the Muzaffarpur Railway Station/ Bus Station, Darbhanga Junction Railway Station/ Bus Station Madhubani Railway Station/ Bus Station and Motihari Railway Station/ Bus Station.

== Sitamarhi ==
The town is situated along the border of Nepal and has often been affected by natural disasters. One of the most devastating is excess flooding due to mismanagement of the banks by both civilians and government officials. This town was almost completely destroyed by the earthquake of 1934.

Sitamarhi is (approximately 140 km) away from Patna, lies the historical and mythologically essayed town of Sitamarhi.

== Gallery ==
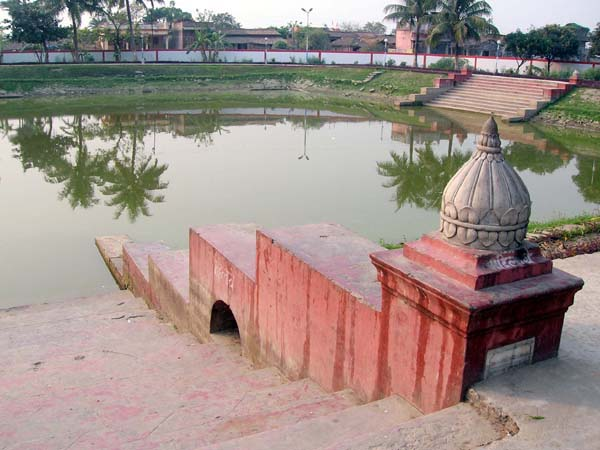
Janaki kund, Sitamarhi

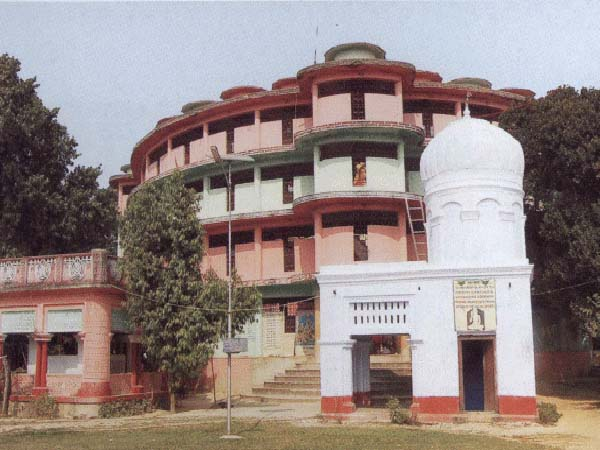
Bagahi Math Sitamarhi

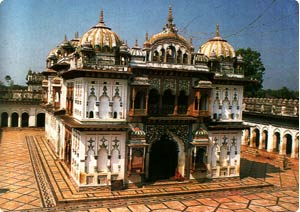
Janakpur

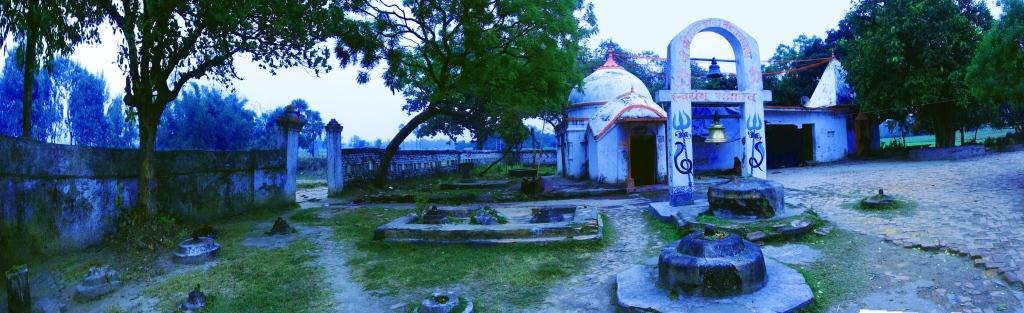
Damamis

== See also ==
- Sitamarhi
- Munger Fort
- Sita Kund, a spring of Surajkund hot spring
- Punaura Dham
