= Amneswarnath Mahadev Mandir =

Ancient Shiva temple in Mithila

Coordinates: 26.5844°N 85.6767°E

- अमनेश्वरनाथ महादेव मंदिर

Religion
- Affiliation: Hinduism
- District: Sitamarhi district
- Deity: Lord Shiva
- Festivals: Mahashivratri, Sawan Sombari, Basant Panchami, and Durga Puja, etc

Location
- Location: Amana village, Mithila region
- State: Bihar
- Country: India
- Interactive map of Amneswarnath Mahadev Mandir

Architecture
- Founder: Maharaj Bahadur Singh (1339), Vijay Shahi (2009)
- Creator: Unknown (During Ramayana)
- Established: Treta Yuga
- Groundbreaking: 12th century CE
- Completed: 2010
- Demolished: Between 15th century to 19th century CE
- Site area: Rural
- Shiva temple associated with Ramayana

Amneswarnath Mahadev Mandir (Maithili: अमनेश्वरनाथ महादेव मंदिर) is an ancient temple dedicated to Lord Shiva in the Mithila region of the Indian subcontinent. It is located at Amana village of the Sursand block in the Sitamarhi district of Bihar in India. It is situated on the bank of Sanghi river flowing through the village. The Hindu adherents believe that it is existing since Treta Yuga of Ramayana. It is also called as Baba Amneshwar Nath Mahadev Mandir.

== Description ==
According to the local legend, it is believed that the princes Rama, Lakshmana of Ayodhya and Guru Vishwamitra rested at this place for a night while on their way to participate in the Dhanush Yajna organised at the court of King Janaka for Sita Swayamvara in Janakpur. There are two ponds Itharba Pokhair and Gorhi Pokhair near the temple. On the bank of the Gorhi Pokhair there was an arrangement for keeping horses and elephants. The campus of the temple is spread over 3 acres area of land.

The Shivalinga of the temple is worshiped with Kanail flowers and Dhatura. In the campus of the Amaneswarnath Mahadev Mandir, there is an other temple dedicated to the joint form Gaurishankar of Goddess Parvati and Lord Shiva. The temple is known as Gaurishankar Mandir. Similarly a very tall statue of Lord Hanuman has been installed in the campus. It will be inaugurated and a grand ceremony of the Hindu ritual Pran Pratishtha will be held on the occasion of the upcoming Hanuman Jayanti on 12 April 2025.

== History ==
Amneswarnath Mahadev Mandir is mentioned in the text Pushpa Lata composed by Maithili poet Vidyapati. Similarly it is also mentioned in the text Ramacharitmanas of the Awadhi poet Goswami Tulsi Das.

In the early times, the area around it was full of thick and rugged jungle. The shivling of Amneswarnath Mahadev was first noticed during the period of the 12th century CE. It is said that during period of the 13th century, Maharaj Bahadur Singh of Mithila was enthralled by the Shivalinga of Amanaswarnath Mahadev there. He tried to take away the Shivalinga from the Amana village to his capital Darbhanga but failed in all his efforts. Finally in the year 1339, he built a grand temple in the village. The temple is known as Baba Amaneshwar Nath Mahadev Mandir.

It is said that later due to floods and earthquakes in the area, the temple was destroyed and gradually it was covered with dense forests. Later the temple was forgotten. In the year 1955–56, the temple was rediscovered. The news of this temple again spread among the people, but very few people came to it.

=== Restoration of temple ===
The temple of Amaneshwar Nath Mahadev was restored by a then social worker, Vijay Shahi. He was a resident of Shahi Meenapur in the Muzaffarpur district of the Mithila region in Bihar. It is said that Vijay Shahi came to know the story of the glory of Amaneshwar Mahadev of Amana, while he was at his father-in-law's house in Bajpatti.

After listening the glory of the temple, he visited and took blessings. From the inspiration of Lord Mahadev, he pledged to restore this temple immediately. In 2009, he started the construction of the new grand temple. The construction of the new temple was completed within a year. After the establishment of the new grand temple in 2010, the Amanaswarnath Mahadev Mandir again becomes famous in the region.
