= Sonbarsha, Sitamarhi Assembly constituency =

Coordinates: 26°50′52″N 85°34′48″E

Sonbarsha
- Former constituency for the Bihar Legislative Assembly

Constituency details
- Country: India
- Region: East India
- State: Bihar
- District: Sitamarhi
- Lok Sabha constituency: Sitamarhi
- Established: 1977
- Abolished: 2010

Sonbarsa Assembly constituency was an assembly constituency in Sitamarhi district in the Indian state of Bihar.

== Overview ==
It was part of Sitamarhi Lok Sabha constituency.

As a consequence of the orders of the Delimitation Commission of India, Sonbarsa Assembly constituency ceased to exist in 2010.

== Election results ==
=== 1977-2005 ===
In the October 2005, February 2005, and 2000 state assembly elections, Dr. Ram Chandra Purvey of RJD won the 70 Sonbarsha assembly seat, defeating his nearest rivals, Amzad Hussain Anwar of BSP in October 2005, Md. Anwarul Haque of LJP and Md. Hira Khan of Congress in 2000. Contests in most years were multi cornered but only winners and runners are being mentioned. Ramjiwan Prasad of JD defeated Md. Anwarul Haque of Congress in 1995 and 1990. Kapoori Thakur of LD defeated Anwarul Haque, Independent, in 1985. Anwarul Haque of Congress defeated Indal Singh of Janata Party (Secular – Charan Singh) in 1980. Mahmud Alam of Congress defeated Suryadeo Purbey of JP in 1977.
