= Pundrik Ashram =

Ashram of Vedic sage Pundrik

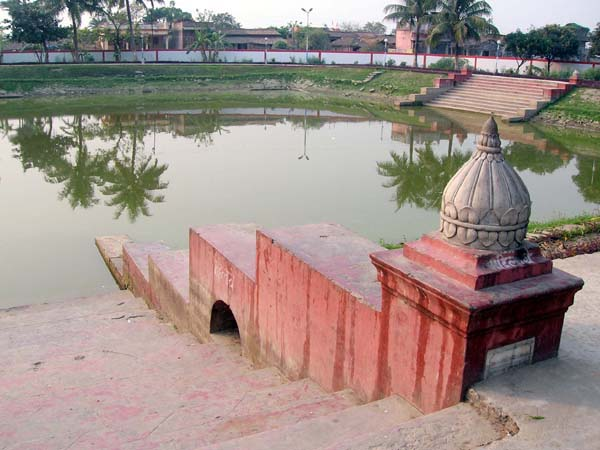
- Sita Kund

Monastery information
- Established: Sage Pundrik
- Dedication: Vedas, Cosmic deeds of Vedas

People
- Founder: Sage Pundrik

Architecture
- Heritage designation: Ancient Mithila University

Site
- Location: Punauradham, Sitamarhi district, Mithila region, Bihar
- Country: India
- Visible remains: Sita Kund, Pundakeshwar Mahadev Mandir

Pundrik Ashram is a Hindu monastery related to the Vedic sage Pundrik. The sage Pundrik was an Indian sage mentioned in the Indian religious texts. He was born in a Brahmin family. He was an ascetic connoisseur of Vedas, lover of self-study, conqueror of senses and forgiving. He was committed to observance of cosmic-Vedic deeds. Pundrik Ashram is located at Punaura Dham in Sitamarhi district of Mithila region of Bihar. According to legend, Punauradham is considered as the penance place of Pundrik Rishi.

== Description ==
According to legends, there was an ashram of the sage Pundrik, from which this place was named Pundrik village, which later became popular as Punaura or Punaranya and presently it is known as Punauradham. In 'Padmapuran', Devarshi Narad had described the Pundrik Tirtha to Lord Rama that a creature becomes pure just by entering the ashram of Punauradham because it is the place of the incarnation of the goddess Laxmi as Bhumiputri from the earth. In the ashram there is a Lord Shiva temple known as Pundakeshwar Mahadev Mandir. There is a religious pond near the Ashram known as Sita Kund or Janaki Kund. The Sita Kund is believed as the manifestation place of the goddess Sita. It is believed that this ancient pond has been the penance place of sage Maharishi Pundrik. There is Lord Sun temple to the east, Lord Shiva temple to the west and goddess Kali temple to the south at the pond. Earlier in the Ramayana this place was the hermitage of the sage Pundarik. Once there was a famine in the Kingdom of Mithila, then the King Janaka ploughed there in the farm field on the advice of the sages. But when the goddess Sita was found by the King Janaka from the field during he was ploughing, then the sage Pundrik donated this part of the hermitage to the King Janaka for the monument of the birthplace of goddess Sita. Presently Swami Umeshanand is the Pithadhishwar of the Pundarik Rishi Kshetra. A grand Yajnashala is proposed to be built in the Ashram. On 28 January 2022, Pandit Umesh Mishra laid the foundation stone of the grand Yajnashala under the chairmanship of Shri Kishori Sharan Madhukar Muthia Baba, the saint of Shri Sitaram Naam Sukhdham Ashram Muthia Baba Kutiya.
