= Panth Pakar =

Legend place of Ramayana in Mithila

- पंथ पाकड़

Religion
- Affiliation: Hinduism; Places of Ramayana
- District: Sitamarhi
- Region: Mithila
- Deity: Goddess Sita
- Ecclesiastical or organisational status: Hindu Teertha
- Status: Recognised in Ramayana circuit
- Religious features: Ancient divine Pakar tree

Location
- State: Bihar
- Country: India
- Interactive map of Panth Pakar

Architecture
- Founder: Goddess Sita
- Established: Treta Yuga

Panth Pakar (Maithili: पंथ पाकड़) is a legendary place related to the Indian epic Ramayana in the Mithila region of the Indian subcontinent. It is located in the Sitamarhi district of Bihar in India. It is situated at a distance of about 8 km in the north-east direction from the district headquarter of the Sitamarhi district. According to Hindu adherents, it is believed that Goddess Sita stayed here for a night during her journey to Ayodhya from Janakpur, after her marriage with Lord Rama.

== Panth Pakar village ==
The village, where the site of the legendary place is located, is also known as Panth Pakar. The village is in the Bathnaha block of the district.

== Etymology ==
The legendary place is named after two Indic terms Panth and Pakar. The literal meaning of the term Panth is road or way and that of Pakar is a tree from the species of Banayan trees in India. The term Panth refers to the path of the journey of Lord Rama and Goddess Sita from Janakpur to Ayodhya after their marriage. Similarly the term Pakar refers to the legendary tree of Pakar where they took rest for a night during their journey.

== Legends ==
According to legend, there are several stories related to the epic Ramayana connected to the site of Panth Pakar. It is said that the princess Sita Devi of Mithila had rested for a night under a Pakar tree at this very spot. The King Dasharatha of Ayodhya stopped here for a night's rest on their way back to Ayodhya after the wedding of Rama and Sita, along with procession of Lord Rama. It is said that during the stopover, Sita fashioned a Daatun (toothbrush made of plant stick) from the nearby Pakar tree branch and, after using it, threw it into the ground. The toothbrush sprouted a sprout, and over time, a large cluster of Pakar trees grew here. Nowadays, these trees are so large and intertwined that they are a fascinating sight for devotees. The devotees believe that these trees are living testament to Sita's memory, and that merely seeing them bestows blessings. Similarly, according to an other legend, it is said that the first dialogue between Lord Rama and Lord Parshuram mentioned in Valmiki Ramayana and Ramcharitmanas took place at this same place.

== Upgradation as a Teertha ==
In 2024, the chief minister Nitish Kumar of the state visited the holy shrine on 26 December during his Pragati Yatra in the region. He announced to recognise the site as a Hindu shrine known as Panthpakar Dham. He also announced a budget of 23.66 crore for the development of the place as a Hindu teertha for the tourism of the Hindu pilgrimage in the world. According to the District Magistrate of the district, the fund of the budget will be used to develop the tourist destination of the Panthpadak Dham. A grand temple complex will be developed, which includes access roads, a cafeteria, a parking lot, and a thematic gate, potable water supply, streetlights, high-mast lights, pond restoration, and artwork. It is expected that it will create several tourism-related employment opportunities in the region.

On 8 August 2025, the union home minister Amit Shah included the site in the list of Ramayana circuit in India.
