= Ram - Janaki Path =

Proposed National Highway between Sitamarhi and Ayodhya

- राम-जानकी पथ
- Ram - Janaki Marg

Route information
- Existed: Proposed–present

Major junctions
- Tourist loop around Sitamarhi and Ayodhya

Location
- Country: India
- States: Bihar and Uttar Pradesh

Highway system
- Four lines

Ram - Janaki Path (Devanagari: राम-जानकी पथ) is a proposed national highway in India between the two culturally tied cities of Sitamarhi and Ayodhya. It is also called as Ram - Janaki Marg. The project of this national highway aims to promote religious tourism of the Ramayana circuit and improve the transportation network in these areas. The length of the highway will be 240 kilometer long and its width will be 70 meter. It will pass through the states of Bihar and Uttar Pradesh. The estimated cost of the project is Rs 6155 crores. It is a four lines highway project. The project was approved by the Prime Minister Narendra Modi on the occasion of Ramnavami in the month of April in 2025.

== Description ==
The project for the Ram Janaki Path is divided into two stretches in states of Bihar and Uttar Pradesh. The Union Minister for Road Transport and Highways, Nitin Gadkari, informed the Lok Sabha during the Budget session of 2025 in the month of March in the parliament of India that the two stretches of the project would be completed by May and December 2027 in states of Bihar and Uttar Pradesh respectively.

The project of the Ram Janaki Path highway is extended upto Bhithamore border near the Indo - Nepal border line in the Sitamarhi district of Bihar in India.
