= Ramayana circuit =

Tourism circuit related to Ramayana in India

The Ramayana circuit (Devnagari: रामायण सर्किट) is a tourism circuit developed by the Government of India to promote tourism at the destinations related to Ramayana in the Indian subcontinent. It is developed under the Swadesh Darshan scheme of Ministry of Tourism. Initially, the ministry of tourism identified fifteen destinations for the Ramayana circuit in India. They are Ayodhya, Nandigram, Shringverpur & Chitrakoot in Uttar Pradesh, Sitamarhi, Buxar & Darbhanga in Bihar, Chitrakoot in Madhya Pradesh, Mahendragiri in Odisha, Jagdalpur in Chhattisgarh, Nashik & Nagpur in Maharashtra, Bhadrachalam in Telangana, Hampi in Karnataka and Rameshwaram in Tamil Nadu. It also include the city of Janakpur in Nepal.

== Description ==
The Ramayana circuit includes major pilgrim sites in the two neighbouring nations India and Nepal which are related and cited in the Ramayana. It connects Ayodhya in India to Janakpur in Nepal including all major pilgrim sites related to Ramayana in the two nations. In 2024, IRCTC launched a tourist train to boost tourism on the Ramayana circuit.

According to the scheme of the Ramayana circuit, all the identified fifteen destination cities will be connected by rail, road and air.

== State wise ==
=== Bihar ===
In the state of Bihar in India, the Bihar Government has identified several locations that have been categorised as the destination places of the Ramayana circuit. These places are

- Janaki Sthan, Sitamarhi
- Punaura Dham, Sitamarhi
- Haleshwar Sthan, Sitamarhi
- Girija Sthan, Phulhar, Madhubani
- Ahilya Sthan, Kamtaul, Darbhanga
- Ram Rekha Ghat, Buxar
