= Parihar Assembly constituency =

Coordinates: 26°42′26″N 85°39′34″E

Parihar
- Constituency No. 25 for the Bihar Legislative Assembly

Constituency details
- Country: India
- Region: East India
- State: Bihar
- Division: Tirhut
- District: Sitamarhi
- Lok Sabha constituency: 5. Sitamarhi
- Established: 2008
- Total electors: 324,889
- Reservation: None

Member of Legislative Assembly
- 18th Bihar Legislative Assembly
- Incumbent Gayatri Devi
- Party: BJP
- Alliance: NDA
- Elected year: 2025
- Preceded by: Ram Naresh Prasad Yadav

Parihar Assembly constituency is an assembly constituency in Sitamarhi district in the Indian state of Bihar.

== Overview ==
As per Delimitation of Parliamentary and Assembly constituencies Order, 2008, 25. Parihar Assembly constituency is composed of the following: Parihar community development block; Sonbarsa, Purandaha Rajwara Paschimi, Purandaha Rajwara Purvi, Indarwa, Pipra Parsain, Jainagar, Madhiya, Singhwahini, Bhaluaha, Bishunpur Aadhar and Dostia gram panchayats of Sonbarsha CD Block.

Parihar Assembly constituency is part of 5. Sitamarhi (Lok Sabha constituency).

== Members of the Legislative Assembly ==
Year	Name	Party
Until 2008: Constituency did not exist
2010	Ram Naresh Prasad Yadav	Bharatiya Janata Party
2015	Gayatri Devi	Bharatiya Janata Party
2020	Gayatri Devi	Bharatiya Janata Party
2025	Gayatri Devi	Bharatiya Janata Party

== Election results ==
=== 2025 ===
2025 Bihar Legislative Assembly election: Parihar
Party	Candidate	Votes	%	±%
BJP	Gayatri Devi	82,644	39.36	▼3.16
Independent	Ritu Jaiswal	65,455	31.17	
RJD	Smita Gupta	48,534	23.11	▼18.5
JSP	Awadhesh Prasad Kushwaha	3,217	1.53	
AAP	Akhilesh Narayan Thakur	2,013	0.96	
Independent	Ram Vinod Nayak	1,964	0.94	
NOTA	None of the above	2,379	1.13	▼0.95
Majority		17,189	8.19	▲7.28
Turnout		209,977	64.63	▲10.25
BJP hold		Swing		

=== 2020 ===
Bihar Assembly election, 2020: Parihar
Party	Candidate	Votes	%	±%
BJP	Gayatri Devi	73,420	42.52	+1.8
RJD	Ritu Jaiswal	71,851	41.61	+3.36
RLSP	Amjad Hussain Anwar	9,968	5.77	
JAP(L)	Sarita Yadav	4,164	2.41	−2.5
Independent	Jay Kumar	1,993	1.15	
Independent	Bhushan Prasad	1,587	0.92	
NOTA	None of the above	3,590	2.08	−0.14
Majority		1,569	0.91	−1.56
Turnout		172,663	54.38	−2.99
INC gain from		Swing		

=== 2015 ===
2015 Bihar Legislative Assembly election: Parihar
Party	Candidate	Votes	%	±%
BJP	Gayatri Devi	66,388	40.72	
RJD	Ram Chandra Purve	62,371	38.25	
JAP(L)	Sarita Yadav	8,005	4.91	
BSP	Nilam Yadav	6,794	4.17	
SP	Mohd. Shams Shahnawaz	2,822	1.73	
Independent	Devendra Thakur	2,631	1.61	
CPI	Md. Nazamuddin Ansari	2,405	1.48	
Independent	Jai Narayan Mahto	1,773	1.09	
NOTA	None of the above	3,618	2.22	
Majority		4,017	2.47	
Turnout		163,042	57.37	
