= Gayatri Devi (Bihar politician) =

Indian politician

Member of Bihar Legislative Assembly
- Incumbent
- Assumed office 10 November 2015
- Preceded by: Ram Naresh Prasad Yadav
- Constituency: Parihar

Personal details
- Born: 1 January 1964 (age 62)
- Party: Bharatiya Janata Party
- Occupation: Politician

Gayatri Devi alias Gayatri Yadav (born 1 January 1964) is a member of the Bharatiya Janata Party from Bihar. She won the Bihar Legislative Assembly election in 2015 from Parihar.

== Early life and education ==
Devi was born in a village Koili Bhraon of Muzaffarpur district in Bihar state. She studied Class 9 at Ram Kishor High School, Chhapra Muzaffarpur and passed the examinations in 1978.

== Personal life ==
Devi is married to former BJP MLA Ram Naresh Yadav. In a case related to Sitamarhi collectorate gun firing case, her husband was convicted and jailed for 10 years.

== Political career ==
In 1990 Devi entered politics. She held various positions in Sitamarhi BJP female wing. She won the 2015 Bihar Legislative Assembly election representing the BJP from Parihar Assembly constituency and defeated her nearest rival, Ramchandra Purve of the RJD.
