= Ramjanaki Math =

Hindu monastery in Sitamarhi

- रामजानकी मठ

Religion
- Affiliation: Hinduism
- District: Sitamarhi
- Deity: Lord Rama and Goddess Sita

Location
- Location: Raghopur Bakhari village, Mithila
- State: Bihar
- Country: India

Architecture
- Founder: Mahant Raghunath Das Maharaj
- Established: Samvat 1193

Ramjanaki Math (Maithili: रामजानकी मठ) also called as Bakhari Math is a historical Hindu monastery cum temple in the Mithila region of Bihar in India. It is located at Raghopur Bakhari village of the Berbas Panchayat in the Dumra block of the Sitamarhi district in Bihar. It was established in the 12th century CE. The matha holds a temple dedicated to Lord Rama and Goddess Sita. The temple is known as Ramjanaki Mandir.

== History ==
The inscription engraved on the door of the Ramjanaki Mandir states that the monastery was established by the Mahant Raghunath Das Maharaj in Samvat 1193. The area was formerly surrounded by forests, where Saint Raghunath Das Maharaj built a hut and practiced penance here.

According to local legend, the Maharaja of Raj Darbhanga came to see the saint Raghunath Das Maharaj, after hearing about his knowledge and asceticism. It is said that seeing the Darbhanga Maharaja coming to him, the saint himself approached the king with his platform of penance. The legend says that the saint attained Samadhi alive at the place of his penance. The Maharaja of Raj Darbhanga donated 250 acres of land to the math for financial resources to maintain the religious activities and services to the temple.

The present Mahanth of the math is Ramlila Das Maharaj. He is managing the math since 1983. Before him the Mahanth of the math was Ramkrishna Das Maharaj. According to the present Mahanth, his ancestors are becoming the Mahanth of the math since the 12 generations ago.
