= Riga Gaon =

Village in Mithila

Riga Gaon रीगा
- Village
- Riga
- Interactive map of Riga Gaon
- Country: India
- State: Bihar
- Region: Mithila
- Division: Tirhut
- Named for: Rigaveda

Population
  - Total: 27,518
- Demonym: Maithil

Languages
  - Official: Mother tongue; Ancient: Hindi: Maithili; Sanskrit
- Seat of learning Rigaveda in ancient Mithila; First villages of India

Riga (Maithili: रीगा) is a historical village in the Mithila region of the Indian subcontinent. It is located in the Sitamarhi district of Bihar in India. In ancient period, the village was the seat of learning Rigaveda in Mithila. It was a prominent centre for Sanskrit and Vedic learning in Mithila. The village holds a major sugar mill of the region. The sugar mill is popularly known as Riga sugar mill. Riga is also a block as well as constituency in the Sitamarhi district.

== Description ==
The village is located near Indo-Nepal border area. Since its locality near border area, the village is also designated as one of the "first villages of India" by the prime minister Narendra Modi.

== Demographics ==
Riga is a large village in the Sitamarhi district. As per the census of 2011, the number of families residing in this village is 5766. The total population of the village is 27518, of which 14572 are male while 12946 are females.
