= Punaura Dham =

Hindu temple in Sitamarhi district, India

Coordinates: 26.5865°N 85.4668°E

Maa Janaki Janmabhoomi Temple or Punaura Dham
- पुनौरा धाम
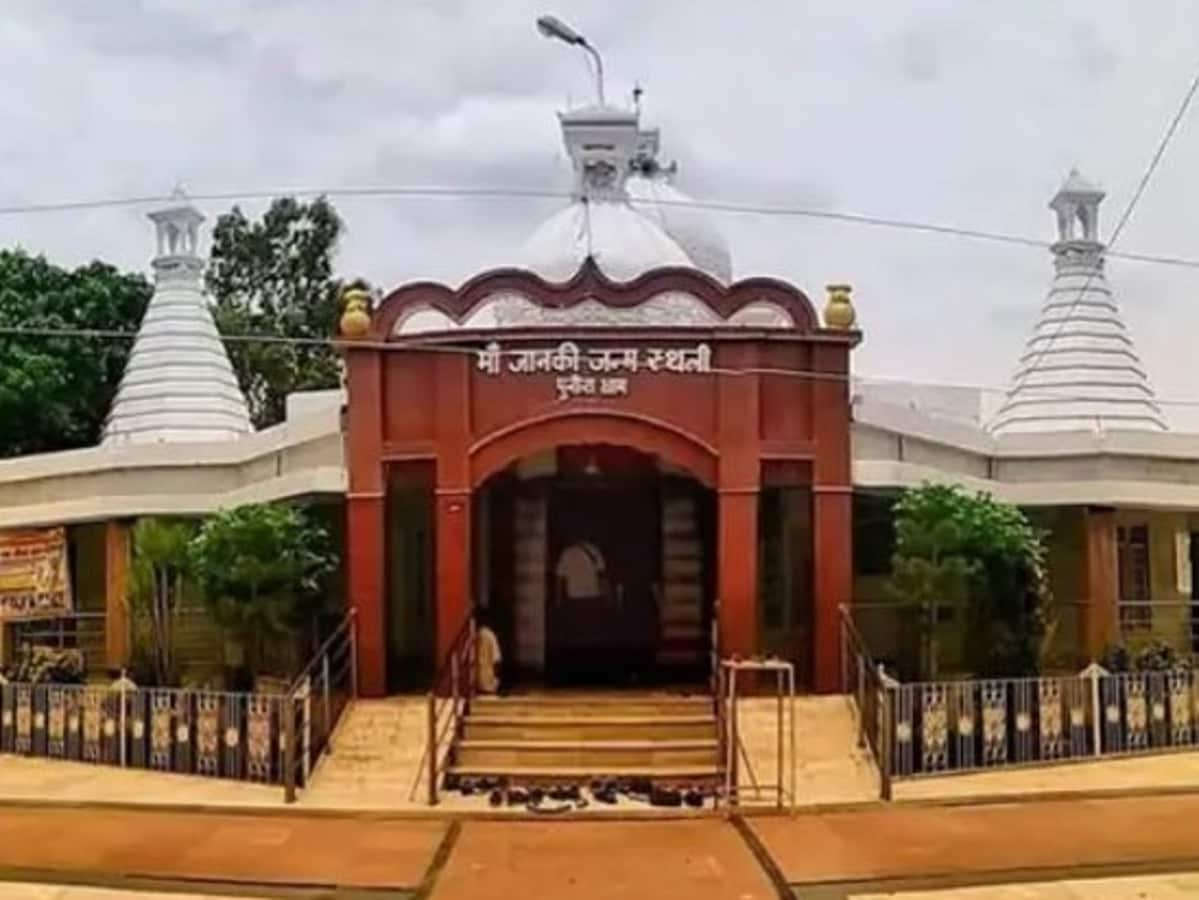
- The ancient temple of Janaki Janmabhoomi at Punaura Dham in the Sitamarhi district of the Mithila region

Religion
- Affiliation: Hinduism
- District: Sitamarhi
- Deity: Sita
- Festivals: Janaki Navami, Vivaha Panchami, Ram Navami
- Status: Active

Location
- Location: Mithila region
- State: Bihar
- Country: India
- Interactive map of Maa Janaki Janmabhoomi Temple or Punaura Dham

Architecture
- Founder: King Janaka, Pundrik Rishi
- Established: Treta Yuga
- Birth place of Goddess Sita in Hinduism

Punaura Dham, entailing Janaki Janmasthali Mandir (lit. Janaki Birthplace Temple), revered as the birth place of Mata Sita, the consort of Lord Rama, in Punaura village 5 km southwest of Sitamarhi city of Sitamarhi district in north Bihar near India–Nepal border. Since this temple has immense religious and spiritual significance for Hindus, a large number of pilgrims from all over the world visit here every day. It has been included as a cultural heritage site by the Government of India under the scheme for protection of cultural heritage in the country. The Punaura Dham is one of the major destination in the ambitious Ramayana circuit developed by the Government of India. A new city named Sitapuram around the legendary shrine Punaura Dham has been proposed.

In the Indian subcontinent, Goddess Sita is generally worshiped as the part of the divine couple with Lord Rama in Hinduism. But Punaura Dham is one of the few temples in the subcontinent dedicated to Goddess Sita, where she is worshipped independently.

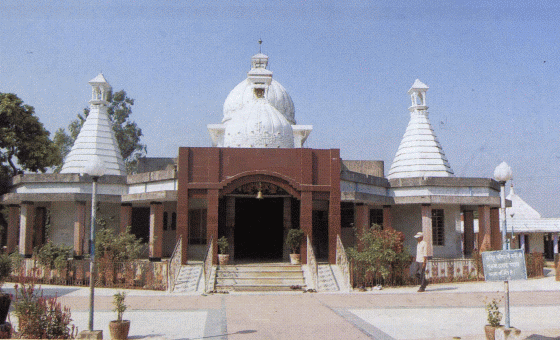
Older view of Punaura Dham

== Etymology ==
According to legend, the term Punaura is derived from the name of the Vedic sage Pundrik. It is believed that there was an ashram of the Vedic sage Pundrik, from which this place was named Pundrik village, which later became popular as Punaura or Punaranya and presently it is known as Punaura Dham. It was the location of the ancient Pundrik Ashram.

== History ==
Punaura is in the Mithila region, also called the Tirhut or Tirabhukti, with history dating back to the Vedic period (1500-500 BCE) when it was one of the 16 Mahajanapadas of India, covers surrounding areas of Bihar and Nepal.

According to Valmiki's Ramayana, once there was a severe famine of 12 years in Mithila and then the King Janaka performed a great Yajna with the advice of his priest. As part of this ritual, the King Janaka and his queen Sunaina had to go and plough the barren and rocky land themselves. They had come to plough the barren land that was outside the boundary of the ashram of sage Pundarik. The priest there advised the King of Videha, Janaka, to plow the field. When the King Janaka was ploughing the field, an earthen pot came out of the ground, in which Mother Sita was in an infant state. The Punaura Dham is believed to be the spot where that earthen pot came out, hence revered as the birthplace of Sita. Since she came out of a furrow when King Janaka was ploughing the land, he adopted her as his daughter and named her Sita, which means "furrow" in Sanskrit and he also gave her the name Janaki, meaning daughter of Janaka.

Behind the Sita Mata temple in Punaura Dham, there is a lake by the name of Janaki Kund. There is a belief about this lake that bathing in this lake gives birth to children.

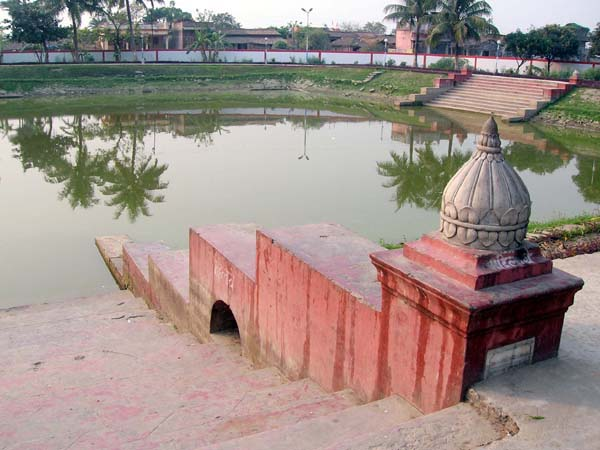
Janaki Kund at Punaura Dham

== Legend ==
According to legend, Punaura Dham is mentioned in the text Padma Purana. In the legend, the celestial sage Devashree Narada explained the divinity of the Punaura Dham to Lord Rama. Similarly in other legend, it is said that Parashurama used to stay at the Pundrik Ashram situated at this place whenever he came to Mithila. In the epic period, this area was the outskirts of the King Janaka's Mithila Kingdom.

There is a legend that the Vedic sage Pundrik established a Surya Mandir at Punaura in devotion to Lord Suryanarayana. The Surya Mandir is presently located on the eastern bank of the Janaki Kund at the premises of the Punaura Dham.

== Management ==
Shree Janaki Janm Bhumi Punaura Dham Mandir Nyas Samiti, a trust for managing the temple corridor, was formed in 2025.

== Upgrade ==
In 2025, Government of Bihar announced Rs 882.87 crore plan to redevelop the Punaura Dham, including the construction of a grand Sita Mata temple and pilgrim corridor on the pattern of Ram Janmabhoomi (lit. 'Birthplace of Rama'). In 2024, 50 acre land around the temple was acquired for this purpose at the cost of Rs 120.58 crore. From this budget, Rs 137 crore will be spent on the redeveloping the old Punaura Dham Janki Temple and remaining Rs 728 crore for the development of pilgrimage corridor and religious tourism facilities around the temple which will also entail upgrade of Sita-Vatika, Luv-Kush Vatika, new parikrama (circumambulation) path, kiosks, cafeteria and children's play areas.

"Design Associates Inc", a design consultant which designed Ayodhya's Ram Janmabhoomi temple, has been appointed the design consultant for the Punaura Dham upgrade project.

== See also ==
- Ram Janmabhoomi, Rama's birthplace
- Janakpur Dham, Sita's birthplace in Nepal
- Krishna Janmasthan Temple Complex, Krishna's birthplace
- Kundinapuri, Rukmini's birthplace
- Kaundinyapur, near Nagpur and associated with Rukmini's birthplace Kundinapuri
- Raval, Mathura, Radha's birthplace
- Parikrama
- Mithila Madhya Parikrama
- Sitamarhi Dham Parikrama
- Yatra
- Ramjanaki Math
