= Dumra, Sitamarhi district =

Dumra
- town
- Location in Bihar, India
- Coordinates: 26.5667271°N 85.5165482°E
- Country: India
- State: Bihar
- Region: Mithila
- District: Sitamarhi
- Established: 11-12 Dec 1971
- Elevation: 86 m (282 ft)

Population (2001)
  - Total: 14,538

Languages
  - Official: Maithili, Hindi
- Time zone: UTC+5:30 (IST)
- Vehicle registration: BR 30
- Lok Sabha constituency: Sitamarhi
- Vidhan Sabha constituency: Sitamarhi

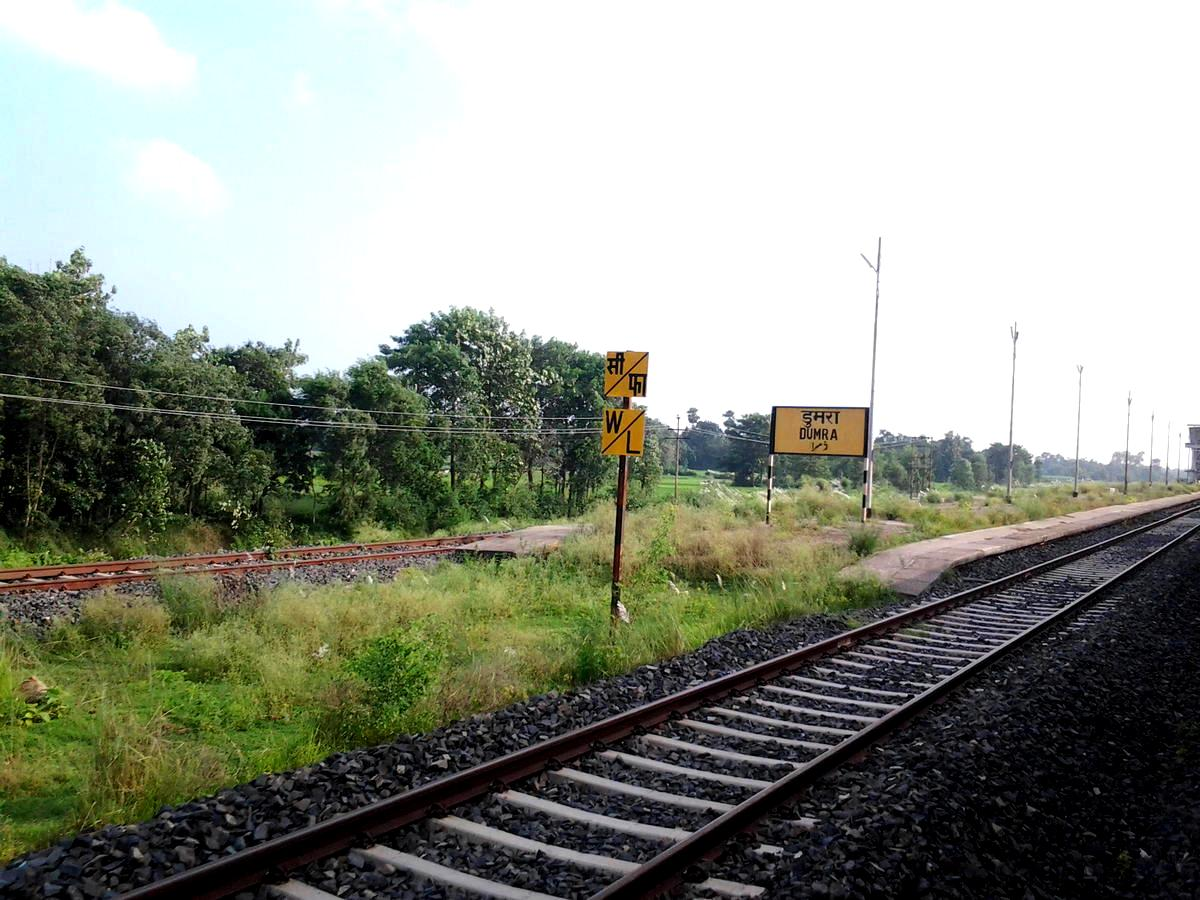
Dumra railway station

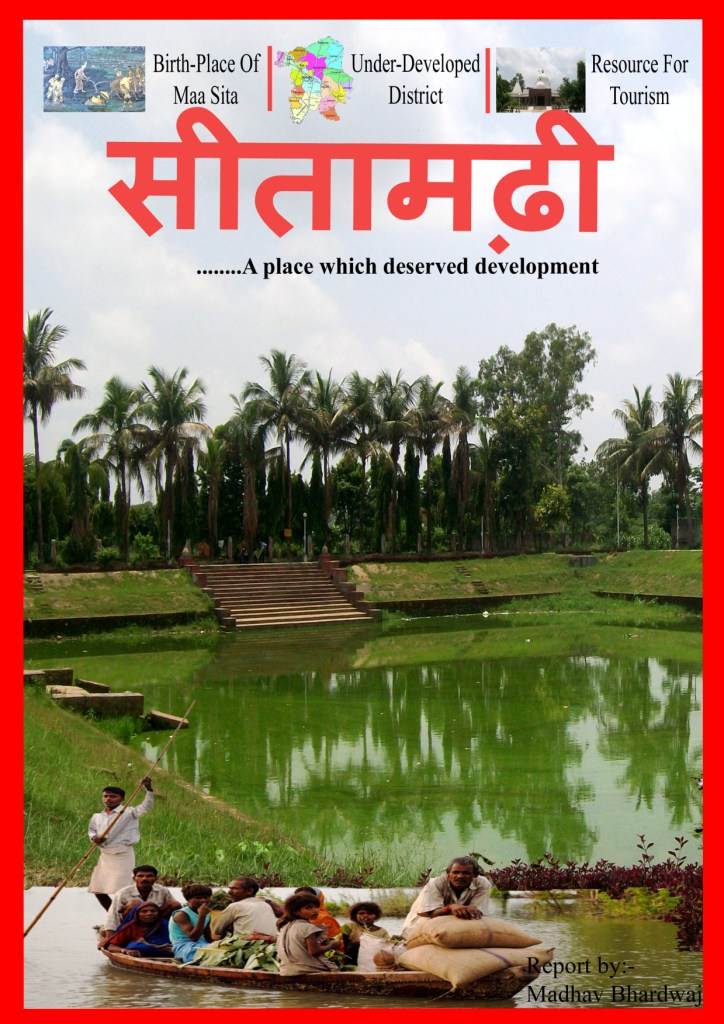
Sitamarhi

Dumra is a town and a notified area in Sitamarhi district in Bihar, India. Dumra is the headquarter of Sitamarhi district. It has approximately 16 wards.

There is a small railway station situated in Dumra.

== Geography ==
Dumra is located at 25.02°N 83.97°E. It has an average elevation of 86 metres (282 feet).

== Demographics ==
As of 2011 India census, Dumra is a Census Town city in district of Sitamarhi, Bihar. The Dumra Census Town has population of 326,332 of which 173,053 are males while 153,279 are females as per report released by Census India 2011.

Religion in Dumra (2011)
| Religion | Percent |
| Hinduism | 97.40% |
| Islam | 2.33% |
| Christianity | 0.05% |
| Sikhism | 0.03% |
| Buddhism | 0.03% |
| Jainism | 0.01% |
| Others | 0.14% |

== Education ==
•Sitamarhi Central School, Simra

- Springdales International Girls' School, Sitamarhi
- Brilliant Public School Sitamarhi
- Delhi Public School Lagma
- Hellen's School Sitamarhi
- Janki Vidya Niketan
- Kamala-Girls High School
- Kendriya Vidyalaya
- Lakshmi High School
- N.S.D.A.V.Public School
- Mathura High School
- Sacred Heart School, Sitamarhi
- Saraswati Vidya Mandir, Ring bandh
- Sitamarhi High School, Dumra
