= Sitamarhi district =

District in Bihar, India

Coordinates: 26°36′00″N 85°29′00″E

- District of Bihar
- Sitamarhi district
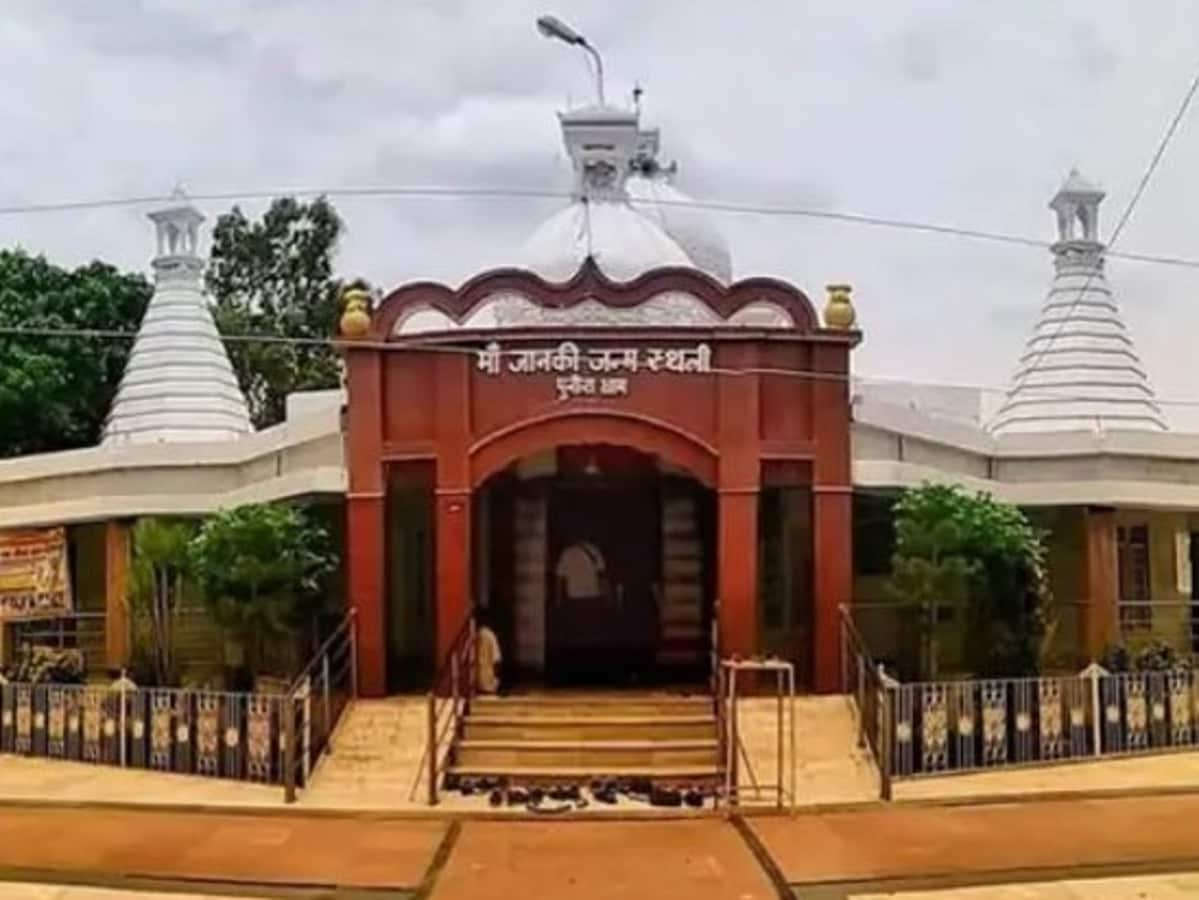
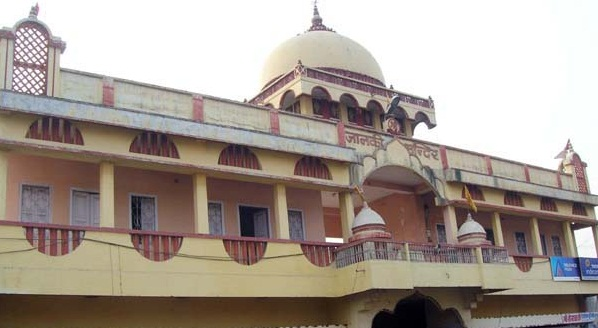
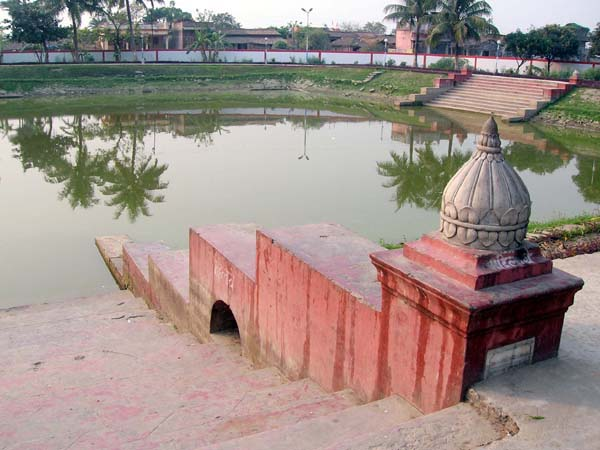
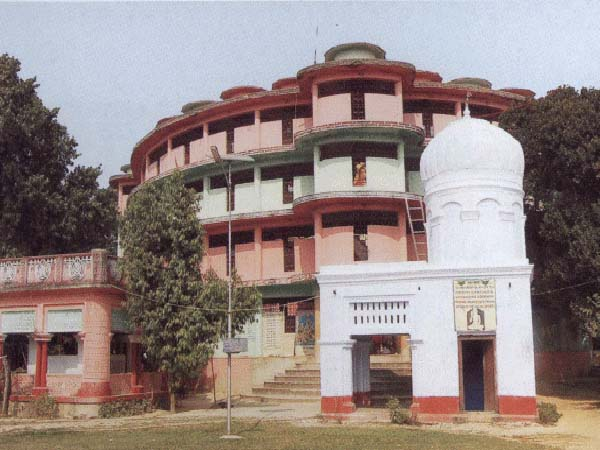
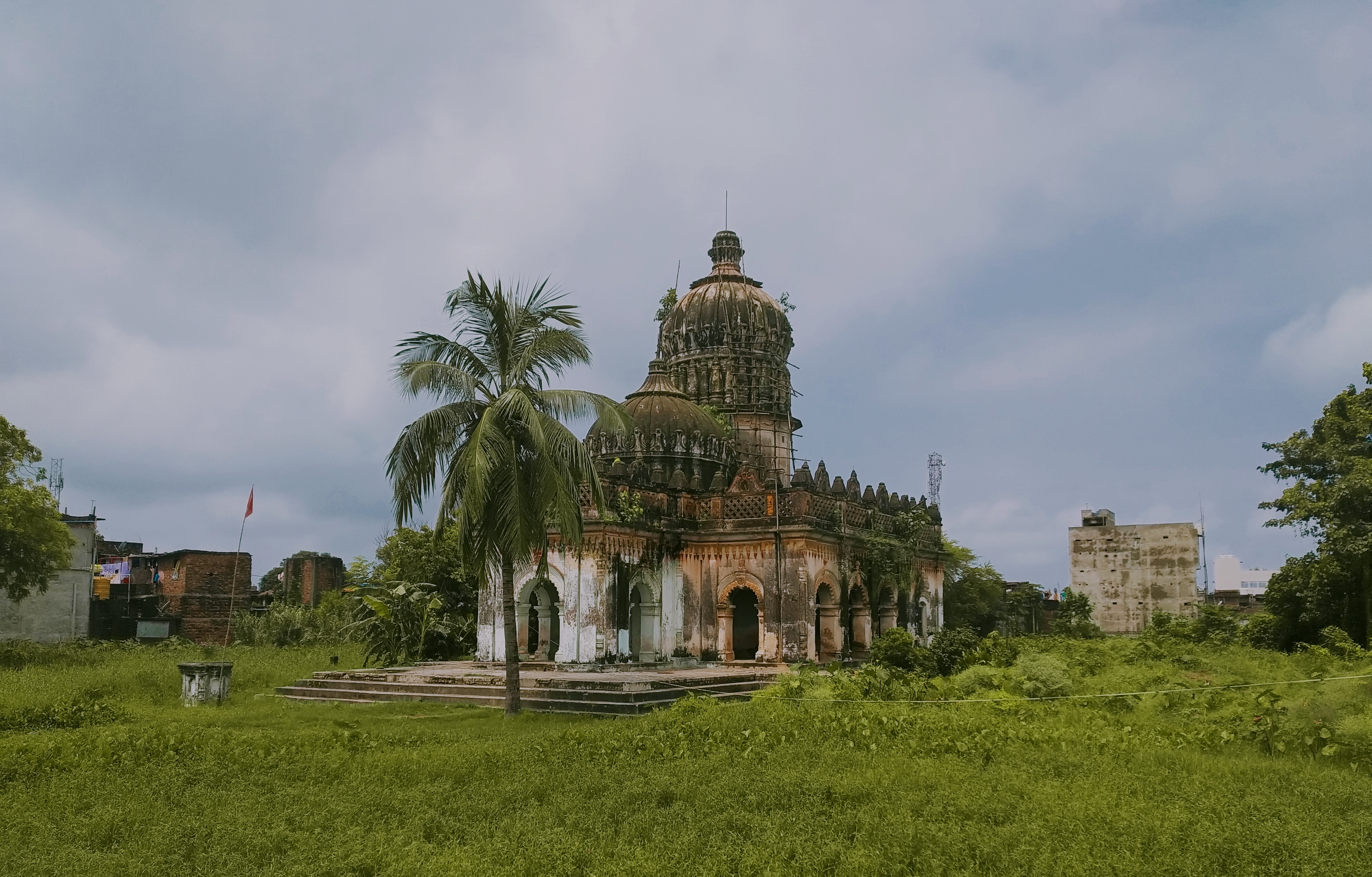
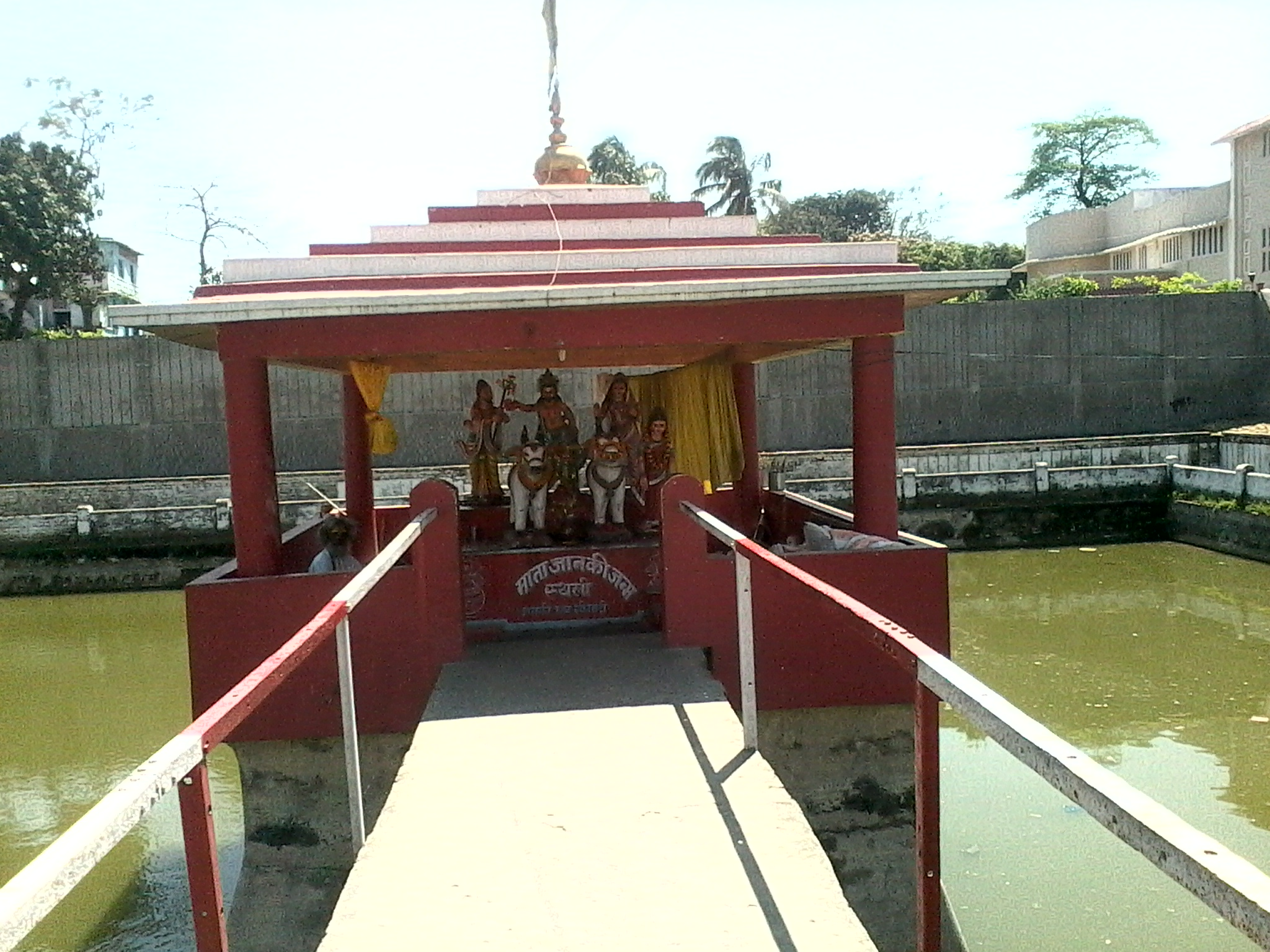
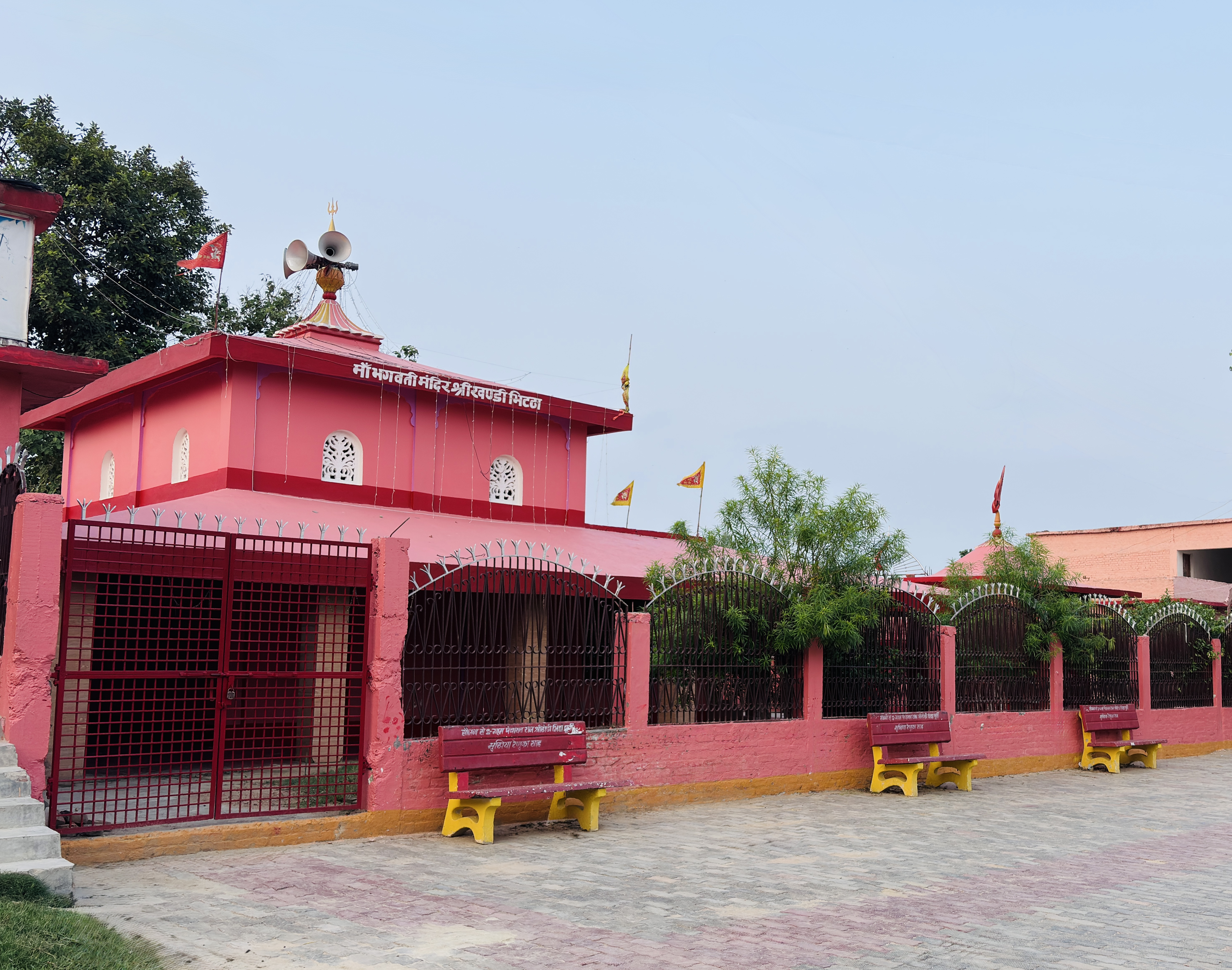
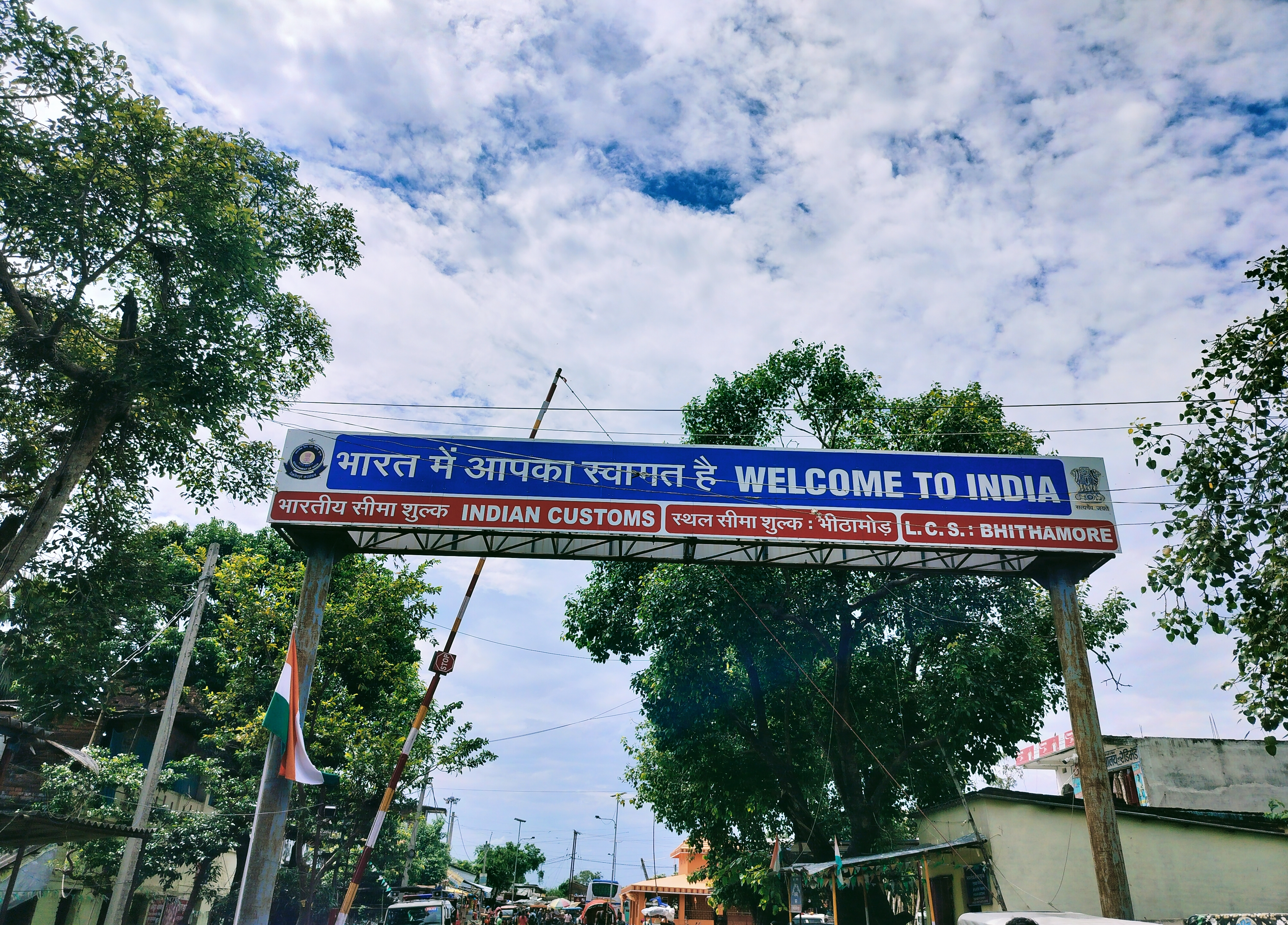
- Maa Janaki Janmabhoomi Temple, Punaura Dham Janaki Sthan Mandir Janaki Kund Bagahi Math Choraut Mandir, Sursand Urvija Kund Bhagwati temple, Bhitthamore Indian Customs Bhitthamore, Gateway to Janakpur, Nepal

- Location of Sitamarhi district in Bihar
- Country: India
- State: Bihar
- Region: Mithila region
- Division: Tirhut
- Founder: King Janaka
- Named for: Sita
- Headquarters: Dumra

Government
  - Lok Sabha constituencies: Sitamarhi
  - Vidhan Sabha constituencies: Riga, Bathnaha, Parihar, Sursand, Bajpatti, Sitamarhi, Runnisaidpur, Belsand

Area
  - Total: 2,185 km^{2} (844 sq mi)

Population (2022)
  - Total: 3,423,574
  - Density: 1,567/km^{2} (4,058/sq mi)
  - Urban: 5.71 per cent
- Demonym: Maithil

Demographics
  - Literacy: 53.53 per cent
  - Sex ratio: 899 females \ 1000 males

Languages
  - Official language: Mother language: Hindi: Bajjika; Maithili
- Time zone: UTC+05:30 (IST)
- Major highways: NH 104
- HDI (2016): ▲0.132 (low)
- Website: sitamarhi.nic.in

Sitamarhi district is one of the districts in the Indian state of Bihar. Dumra is the administrative headquarters of this district. The district is a part of the Tirhut division It is believed to be the place of manifestation of Goddess Sita in the ancient Videha Kingdom while the legendary King Janaka in the epic Ramayana was ploughing a farm field in the present city of Sitamarhi. Presently in the city of Sitamarhi, there are two locations claimed to be the birthplace of the Goddess Sita. The two locations are Urvija Kund at Janaki Sthan and Janaki Kund at Punauradham.

== History ==
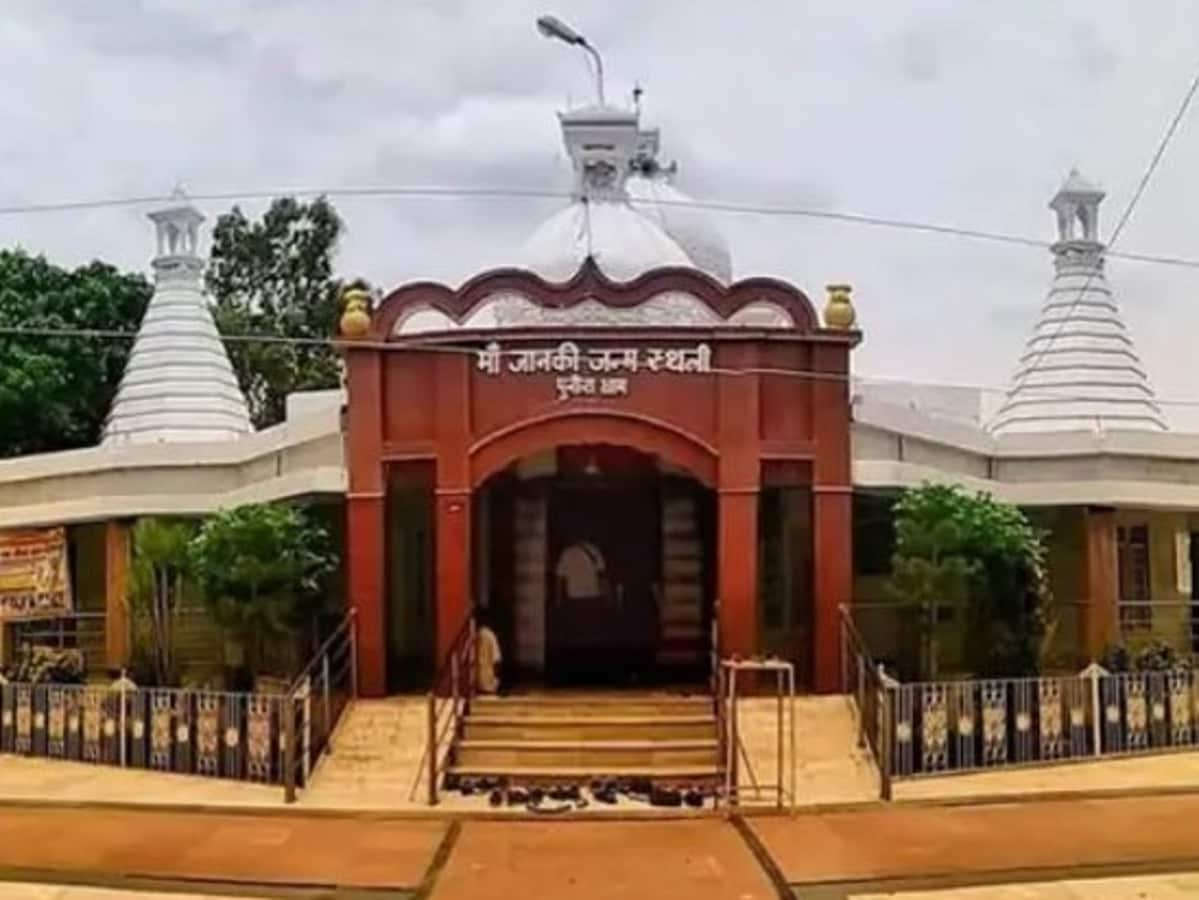
Ancient Janaki Janmabhoomi Mandir at Punaura Dham in Sitamarhi

This place is considered as birthplace of Sita, the main character of the epic Ramayana and a temple dedicated to Sita lies near Sitamarhi town. A Rock cut sanctuary of Mauryan period is found near Sitamarhi.

In 1875, a Sitamarhi subdistrict was created within the Muzaffarpur district. Sitmarhi was detached from Muzaffarpur and became a separate district as of 11 December 1972. It is situated in the northern part of Bihar. The district headquarters is located in Dumra, five kilometers south of Sitamarhi.

Sitamarhi district became a full-fledged district when it was split from Muzaffarpur district in 1972. 1994 saw the split of Sheohar district from Sitamarhi.

The district was a part of the Red Corridor.The Indian government recently declared it naxal-free.

=== Communal riots ===
Sitamarhi district has a history of communal riots dating back to the partition of India. In 1948, violence broke out in Belsand, following by riots in 1959 over issue of the Mahavir Flag; roughly 50 people, mostly Muslims, were killed. Further violence occurred around the issue of Durga Mela - these riots began after a false rumour that Muslims had slaughtered a cow, which was eventually found alive. Another riot in 1959 on the issue of cow slaughter killed 11 people, again mostly Muslims, and destroyed 200 houses. Subsequent riots occurred in 1967, 1968, 1969, and 1989.

== Geography ==
Sitamarhi district occupies an area of 2,294 square kilometres (886 sq mi), comparatively equivalent to Australia's Groote Eylandt.

It is bordered by Nepal to the north, Madhubani district to the east, Darbhanga and Muzaffarpur districts to the south, and Sheohar and East Champaran districts to the west.

It is situated on a flood plain. In August 2019, Sitamarhi district suffered heavy flooding.

== Politics ==
District	No.	Constituency	Name	Party	Alliance	Remarks
Sitamarhi	23	Riga	Baidyanath Prasad	BJP	NDA	
Sitamarhi	24	Bathnaha (SC)	Anil Kumar	BJP	NDA	
Sitamarhi	25	Parihar	Gayatri Devi Yadav	BJP	NDA	
Sitamarhi	26	Sursand	Nagendra Raut	JD(U)	NDA	
Sitamarhi	27	Bajpatti	Rameshwar Mahto	RLM	NDA	
Sitamarhi	28	Sitamarhi	Sunil Kumar Pintu	BJP	NDA	
Sitamarhi	29	Runnisaidpur	Pankaj Kumar Mishra	JD(U)	NDA	
Sitamarhi	30	Belsand	Amit Kumar	LJP(RV)	NDA	

== Block ==
1. Dumra
2. Runni Saidpur
3. Parihar
4. Bathnaha
5. Sonbarsa
6. Bajpatti
7. Sursand
8. Riga
9. Nanpur
10. Pupri
11. Bairgania
12. Bokhara
13. Suppi
14. Belsand
15. Majorganj
16. [Parsauni]
17. Choraut

== Economy ==
It is one of the 38 districts in Bihar currently receiving funds from the Backward Regions Grant Fund Programme (BRGF).

== Education ==
The following is a list of Schools in Sitamarhi, Bihar, India

- Sitamarhi (M.P.) High School, Dumra, Sitamarhi
- Golden bharti public school, Sitamarhi
- D.A.V. Public school, Runnisaidpur
- S.R Dav public school, Pupri
- Saraswati vidya mandir, Pupri
- Sitamarhi Central school, Simra
- Kendriya Vidyalaya Jawahar Nagar, Sutihara
- Janki Vidya Niketan
- Sacred Heart School
- Thakur Yugal Kishore Singh College, Pratap Nagar
- Saraswati Vidya Mandir, Ring bandh
- N.S.D.A.V. Public School
- Hellen's School Sitamarhi
- Delhi Public School, Lagma
- Brilliant Public School, Sitamarhi
- R.O.S. Public School, Khairwa, Riga Road, Sitamarhi
- Mathura High School
- Sri Gandhi High School, Parihar
- Lakshmi High School
- Kamala–Girls High School
- Idaa Dawatul Haque, Madhopur Sultanpur, Runni Saidpur
- Jamia Islamia Quasmia Darululoom Balasath

== Tourism ==
- Amaneswar Nath Mahadev Mandir
- Charaut Math
- Choraut Mandir
- Haleshwar Sthan
- Ishannath Mandir
- Janaki Janmasthali Mandir
- Janaki Sthan
- Mithilapuri Jain Teerth
- Nageshwar Nath Mahadev Mandir
- Paakar Tree, Panth Pakar
- Punaura Dham
- Pundrik Ashram
- Sita Kund
- Shukeshwar Nath Mahadev Mandir
- Swami Bodhayan Mandir
- Urvija Kund
- Valmikeshwar Nath Mahadev Mandir
- Sitamarhi Surya Mandir
- Sitamarhi Dham Parikrama
- Ramjanaki Math
- Hariharnath Mahadev Mandir
- Pundakeshwar Mahadev Mandir

== Transport ==
National Highway 77 connects the area to the Muzaffarpur district and Patna to the South. Sitamarhi has road connections to adjoining districts, of which the major examples are National Highway 77 and National Highway 227. It is situated on the Darbhanga Narkatiaganj railway line and has the largest railway station of the district. Another broad gauge track, running between Muzaffarpur and Sitamarhi. Direct train services are available to places such as New Delhi, Kolkata, Varanasi, Hyderabad and Kanpur. State highways link it to the Madhubani (to the east) and Sheohar (to the west) districts. Railway lines connect Sitamarhi to Darbhanga in east, and to Muzaffarpur in the south and to Raxaul in the west. Sitamarhi has a railway junction. Sitamarhi railway station is on the Raxaul-Darbhanga rail route.

The nearest airport to Sitamarhi is the Darbhanga Airport which is about 70 km from Sitamarhi.

The Sitamarhi-Bhitthamore Road is important for religious reasons as it connects Janakpur, which houses a 200-year-old Janki Temple with Sitamarhi—considered to be the birthplace of Goddess Sita.

National Highway 227 passes through Bhitthamore. Thus it is a gateway to Janakpur, Nepal and other parts of Sitamarhi & Madhubani.

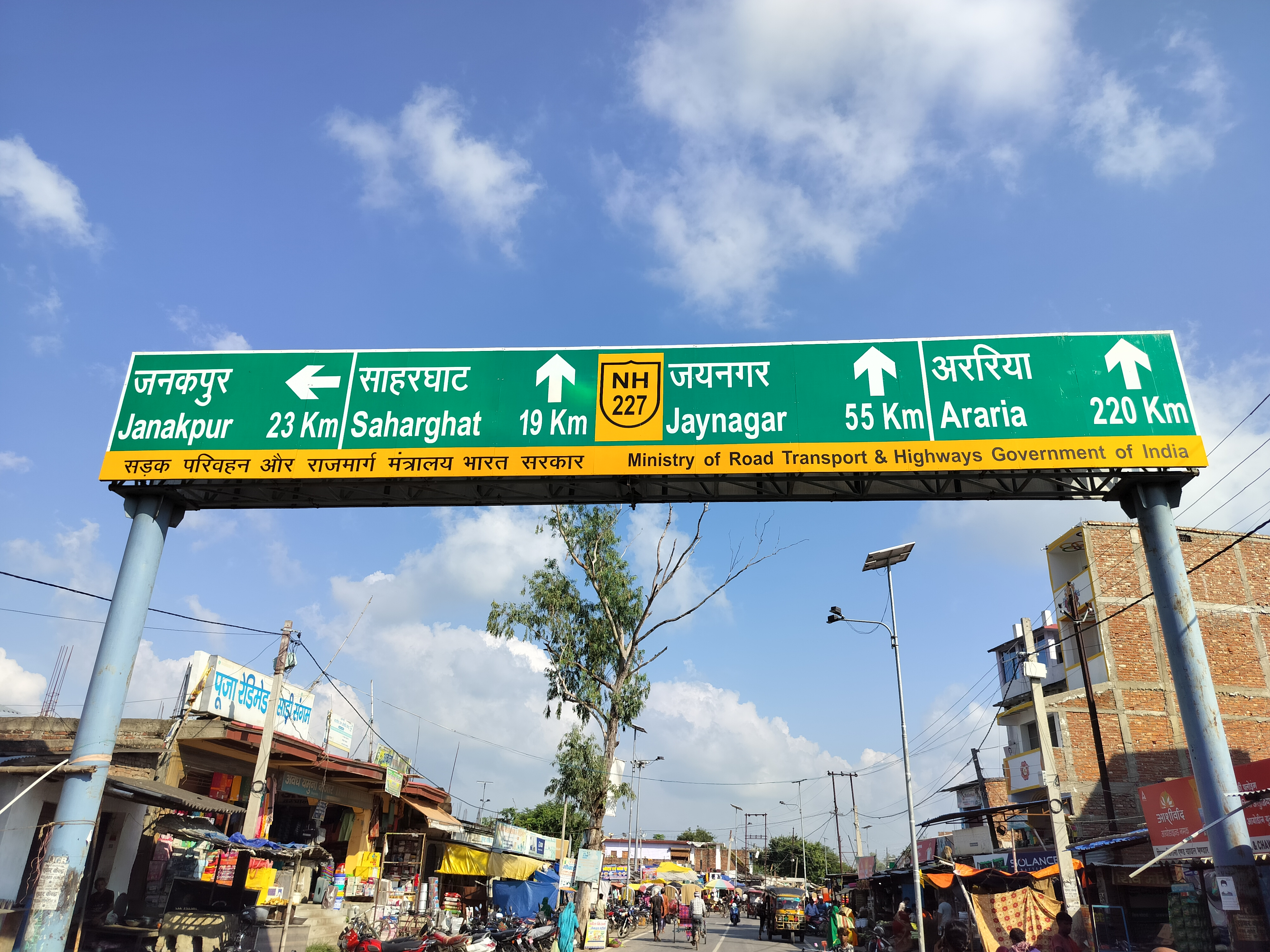
NH227 signage board at Bhitthamore Border

== Demographics ==
Historical population
Year	Pop.	±% p.a.
1901	782,557	—
1911	807,936	+0.32%
1921	782,221	−0.32%
1931	835,055	+0.66%
1941	921,265	+0.99%
1951	999,655	+0.82%
1961	1,158,546	+1.49%
1971	1,323,793	+1.34%
1981	1,627,716	+2.09%
1991	2,013,796	+2.15%
2001	2,682,720	+2.91%
2011	3,423,574	+2.47%

Religions in Sitamarhi district (2011)
Religion	Percent
Hinduism	78.06%
Islam	21.62%
Other or not stated	0.32%

According to the 2011 census Sitamarhi district has a population of 3,423,574, roughly equal to the nation of Panama or the US state of Connecticut. This gives it a ranking of 96th in India (out of a total of 640). The district has a population density of 1,491 inhabitants per square kilometre (3,860/sq mi). Its population growth rate over the decade 2001-2011 was 27.47%. Sitamarhi has a sex ratio of 899 females for every 1000 males, and a literacy rate of 53.53%. 5.56% of the population lives in urban areas. Scheduled Castes and Scheduled Tribes make up 11.85% and 0.09% of the population respectively.

Languages of Sitamarhi district (2011)
1. 'Other' Hindi (49.1%)
2. Hindi (33.5%)
3. Urdu (14.0%)
4. Maithili (3.25%)
5. Others (0.19%)

At the time of the 2011 Census of India, 33.46% of the population spoke Hindi, 13.96% Urdu and 3.25% Maithili as their first language. 49.14% of the population recorded their language as 'Other' Hindi.

== Notable people ==
- Thakur Jugal Kishore Sinha - Former MP (Member of first Lok Sabha) & Freedom Fighter, Father of Co-operative Movement in India.
- Ramcharitra Rai Yadav – Freedom Fighter, Indian Politician, Veteran Socialist Leader and Former member of the Bihar Legislative Assembly. He was the First MLA from Sursand Constituency, Sitamarhi, Bihar during India's First General Election in 1951-1952, which took place after India gained independence.
- Ram Dulari Sinha - Former Union Minister & Governor & Freedom Fighter, First woman from Bihar to become Governor, First women to attain a Master's degree from Bihar
- Jainandan Prasad Yadav – Indian Politician and Former member of the Bihar Legislative Assembly from Sursand Constituency, Sitamarhi, Bihar.
- Shahid Ali Khan (politician) - Indian Politician and 5 times member of the Bihar Legislative Assembly from Sursand, Pupri and Sitamarhi Constituency, Sitamarhi, Bihar. Holding key portfolios such as IT, Minority and Law in bihar government.
- Nawal Kishore Rai - Ex Member of Parliament
- Sitaram Yadav - Ex Member of Parliament
- Ram Kumar Sharma - Indian politician and a former member of parliament from Sitamarhi Lok Sabha constituency, Bihar
- Sunil Kumar Pintu - Member of parliament from Sitamarhi Lok Sabha constituency, Bihar
