= Chairperson of the Bihar Legislative Council =

Indian state government official

- Seal of Bihar
- Incumbent; Vacant
- Bihar Legislative Council
- Style: The Hon’ble (formal); Mr. Chairman (informal)
- Member of: Bihar Legislative Council
- Residence: Patna
- Appointer: Members of the Legislative Council
- Term length: 6 years
- Deputy: Ram Bachan Rai

The Chair of the Bihar Legislative Council is the presiding officer of the Legislative Council of Bihar, the main law-making body for the Indian state of Bihar. Chairmen hold office until ceasing to be a member of the council or resigning from the office. The chairmen can be removed from office by a resolution passed in the council by an effective majority of its members. In the absence of chairman, the meeting is presided by the deputy chairmen.

== List ==
- * represents acting chairmen

=== List of Prisedents of the Bihar and Orissa Legislative Council ===
No	Portrait	Name	Constituency	Term		Party
1	Sir Walton Maude			1921		
2	Sachchidanand Sinha			July 1921	November 1922	
3	Khawaja M. Noorie			1922	1929	
4	Babu Nirsu Narayan Singh			1930	1932	
5	Babu Rajandhari Singh			1933	1936	

=== List of Prisedents/Chairpersons of the Bihar Legislative Council ===
No	Portrait	Name	Constituency	Term			Party
1		Rajiv Ranjan Prasad		23 July 1937	6 September 1948	11 years, 45 days	
2		Shyama Prasad Singh		7 September 1948	11 May 1952	3 years, 247 days	
*		Naima Khatoon Haider		12 May 1952	15 May 1952	3 days	
(2)		Shyama Prasad Singh		15 May 1952	6 May 1958	5 years, 356 days	
*		Rameshwar Prasad Singh		4 April 1959	7 April 1959	3 days	
*		Rai Braj Raj Krishna		7 April 1959	6 May 1959	29 days	
*		Radha Govind Prasad		7 May 1959	10 September 1962	3 years, 126 days	
3		Ravaneshwar Mishra		11 September 1962	6 May 1964	1 year, 238 days	
*		Kumar Ganga Nand Singh		7 May 1964	24 September 1964	140 days	
*		Theodore Bodra		24 September 1964	30 August 1965	340 days	
4		Devsharan Singh		30 August 1965	6 May 1968	2 years, 250 days	
*		Theodore Bodra		7 May 1968	16 May 1972	4 years, 9 days	
*		Rampyari Devi		17 March 1972	6 May 1972	50 days	
*		Anil Kumar Sen		7 May 1972	5 June 1972	29 days	
5		Abdul Ghafoor		5 June 1972	2 July 1973	1 year, 27 days	
*		Ram Govind Singh		2 July 1973	5 January 1975	1 year, 187 days	
*		Mahendra Prasad		5 January 1975	18 March 1975	72 days	
*		Ram Govind Singh		7 January 1975	18 March 1975	70 days	
*		Krishna Kant Singh		18 March 1975	19 March 1975	1 day	
*		Ram Govind Singh		19 March 1975	6 May 1976	1 year, 48 days	
*		Rajeshwari Saroj Das		7 May 1976	6 May 1980	3 years, 365 days	
Vacant from 7 May 1980 to 13 June 1980
*		Shamu Charan Tuvid		14 June 1980	24 July 1980	40 days	
6		Prithvi Chand Kisku		25 July 1980	12 January 1985	4 years, 171 days	
Vacant from 13 January 1985 to 17 January 1985
*		Rajeshwari Saroj Das		18 January 1985	29 January 1985	11 days	
7		Arun Kumar		5 July 1985	3 October 1986	1 year, 90 days	
*		Umeshwar Prasad Verma		4 October 1986	18 January 1990	7 years, 214 days	Indian National Congress
8		Umeshwar Prasad Verma		19 January 1990	6 May 1994	7 years, 214 days	Indian National Congress
*		Raghuvansh Prasad Singh		7 May 1994	5 April 1995	333 days	Janata Dal
*		Jabir Husain		6 April 1995	25 July 1996	11 years, 9 days	Janata Dal
9		Jabir Husain		26 July 1996	6 May 2000	11 years, 9 days	Janata Dal
*		Jabir Husain		7 May 2000	29 June 2000	11 years, 9 days	Rashtriya Janata Dal
(9)		Jabir Husain		30 June 2000	15 April 2006	11 years, 9 days	Rashtriya Janata Dal
*		Arun Kumar	Gaya Teachers	16 April 2006	4 August 2009	3 years, 110 days	Indian National Congress
10		Tarakant Jha	elected by MLA's	4 August 2009	6 May 2012	2 years, 276 days	Bharatiya Janata Party
11		Awadhesh Narain Singh	Gaya Graduates	8 August 2012	8 May 2017	4 years, 273 days	Bharatiya Janata Party
*		Haroon Rashid	elected by MLA's	9 May 2017	6 May 2020	2 years, 363 days	Janata Dal (United)
*		Awadhesh Narain Singh	Gaya Graduates	16 June 2020	25 August 2022	2 years, 70 days	Bharatiya Janata Party
12		Devesh Chandra Thakur	Tirhut Graduates	25 August 2022	24 July 2024	1 year, 294 days	Janata Dal (United)
*		Awadhesh Narain Singh	Gaya Graduates	20 June 2024	24 July 2024	2 years, 100 days	Bharatiya Janata Party
(11)		Awadhesh Narain Singh	Gaya Graduates	24 July 2024	28 September 2026	2 years, 100 days	Bharatiya Janata Party
