= Pankaj Kumar Mishra =

Indian politician (born 1974)

Bihar vidhan sabha

Personal details
- Born: 25 May 1974 (age 52) Sitamarhi
- Education: Graduate in political science
- Occupation: Social Worker

Pankaj Kumar Mishra (born 1974) is an Indian politician and social worker from Bihar. He is a member of the Bihar Legislative Assembly representing the Janata Dal (United). He last won the 2020 Bihar Legislative Assembly election from Runnisaidpur Assembly constituency in Sitamarhi district.

== Early life and education ==
Mishra is from Runni Saidpur, Sitamarhi district, Bihar. He is the son of Kaushal Kishor Mishra. He completed his graduation in arts at a college affiliated with Babasaheb Bhimrao Ambedkar University in 1997. He belongs to Bhumihar caste.

== Career ==
Mishra was elected from Runnisaidpur Assembly constituency in the 2020 Bihar Legislative Assembly election representing the Janata Dal (U). He polled 73,205 votes and defeated his nearest rival, Mangita Devi of the Rashtriya Janata Dal, by a margin of 24,629 votes. Earlier, contesting on Rashtriya Lok Samta Party ticket as part of the Bharatiya Janata Party led NDA alliance in the 2015 Bihar Legislative Assembly election from the same seat. But he lost the seat to Mangita Devi, the daughter-in-law of former MLA Bhola Rai, who is the Mahagathbandhan candidate from RJD. In 2015, he polled 41,589 votes and lost by a margin of 14,110 votes. Earlier, Devi lost the 2010 Assembly election from the same seat as an independent candidate.

In August 2022, after he was ignored for a cabinet berth, he along with four other MLAs of Bhumihar caste, Parbatta MLA Sanjeev Kumar, Barbigha MLA Sudarshan Kumar, Matihani MLA Rajkumar Singh and Kesaria MLA Shalini Mishra, skipped the ceremony at Raj Bhavan in protest.
