= Sunil Kumar Pintu =

Indian politician and member of the 17th Lok Sabha

Member of Parliament Lok Sabha
- In office 2019–2024
- Preceded by: Ram Kumar Sharma
- Succeeded by: Devesh Chandra Thakur
- Constituency: Sitamarhi

Cabinet Minister Government of Bihar
- In office 26 November 2010 – 16 June 2013
- Ministry: Term
- Minister of Tourism: 26 November 2010 - 16 June 2013

Member of Bihar Legislative Assembly
- In office 2003–2015
- Preceded by: Shahid Ali Khan
- Succeeded by: Sunil Kumar Kushwaha
- Constituency: Sitamarhi

Personal details
- Born: 22 August 1961 (age 64) Sitamarhi, Bihar
- Party: Bharatiya Janata Party
- Spouse: Manju Devi

Sunil Kumar Pintu is an Indian politician. He was elected to the Lok Sabha, lower house of the Parliament of India from Sitamarhi, Bihar in the 2019 Indian general election as member of the Janata Dal (United). Pintu is also the president of the Shri Bhagwati Sita Tirtha Kshetra Samiti. Before 2019, he was a member of Bharatiya Janata Party; he had been a Member of Bihar Legislative Assembly from Sitamarhi Assembly constituency for four terms since 2003.

== Controversy ==
In 2025, two MMS videos of Sunil Kumar Pintu surfaced online and were widely circulated.
