= Sitamarhi =

Sitamarhi Mithila
- City
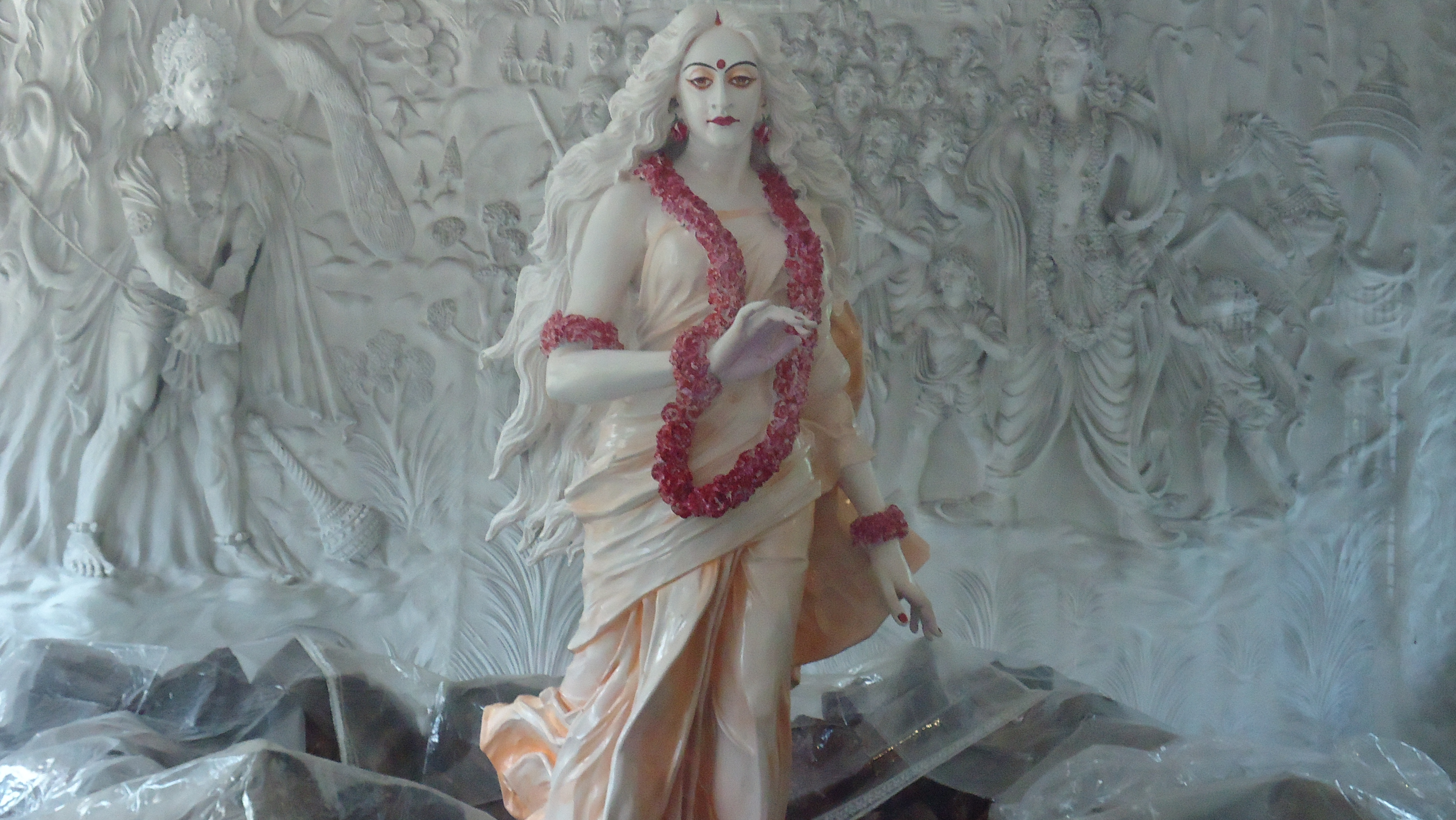
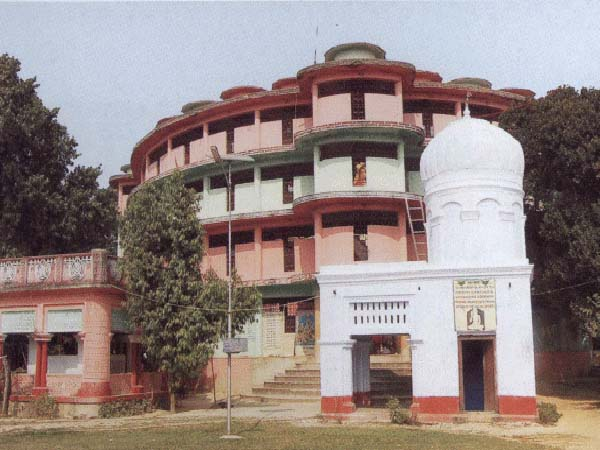
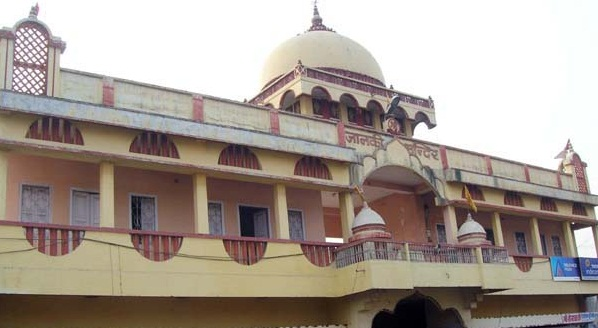
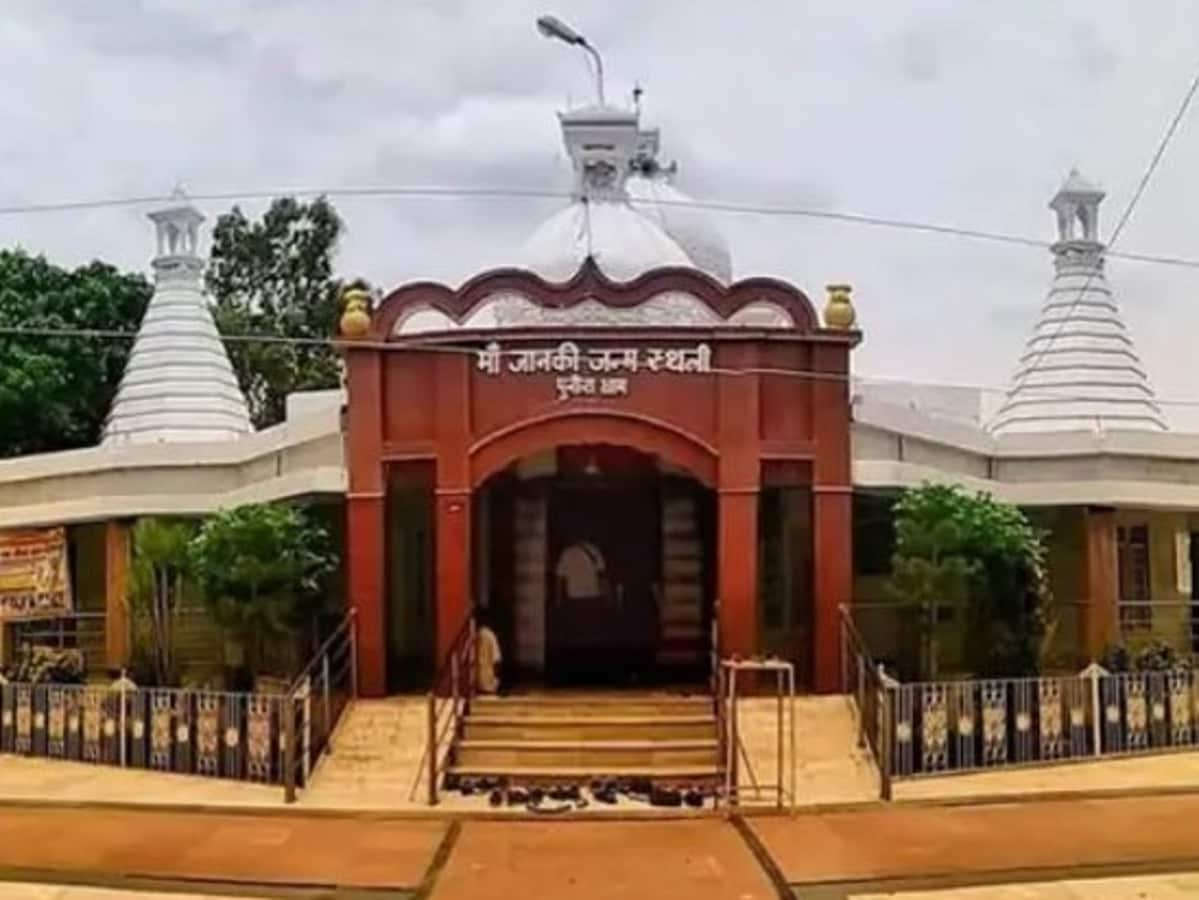
- Top image:Goddess Sita, Middle right:Janaki Sthan Mandir, Middle left: Bagahi Math, Bottom: Punaura Dham, Birthplace of Goddess Sita

- Location in Bihar, India
- Coordinates: 26°35′39″N 85°30′02″E
- Country: India
- State: Bihar
- District: Sitamarhi
- Established: 11 Dec 1972
- Elevation: 56 m (184 ft)

Population (2011)
  - Total: 106,093
- Demonym: Maithil

Languages
  - Official: Hindi
  - Additional official: Urdu
  - Regional languages: Maithili, Bajjika
- Time zone: UTC+5:30 (IST)
- PIN: 843302, 843301, 843331,843323, 843325 (Sitamarhi)
- ISO 3166 code: IN-BR
- Vehicle registration: BR-30
- Lok Sabha constituency: Sitamarhi
- Vidhan Sabha constituency: Sitamarhi
- Website: sitamarhi.nic.in

Sitamarhi (IAST: Sītāmaṛhī) is the headquarters of the Sitamarhi district in Tirhut Division, Bihar. The city was named in honour of Sītā, wife of Rāma, who was born in Sitamarhi according to Hindu legends. She was the princess of the ancient Videha Kingdom also known as Mithila.

In 1875, a subdivision for Sitamarhi was created within the Muzaffarpur district. Sitamarhi was detached from Muzaffarpur and made a separate district on December 11, 1972. The district headquarters is located in Dumra, five kilometres (3 mi) south of Sitamarhi's main temple.

== Geography ==
Sitamarhi has an average elevation of 56 metres (184 ft).

Sitamarhi is located in northern Bihar near the Indo-Nepal border and serves as an important regional hub in the Mithila region.

Nearby towns and cities include:

- Muzaffarpur — approximately 59 km south-west of Sitamarhi
- Mehsi — approximately 55 km south-east of Sitamarhi (via Motihari route)
- Madhubani — approximately 75 km west of Sitamarhi
- Malangwa (Nepal) — approximately 36 km north of Sitamarhi across the Indo-Nepal border

The region is part of the fertile alluvial plains of the Indo-Gangetic basin and is connected through road networks linking Bihar and southern Nepal.

== Culture ==
Sitamarhi dates back to the time of the Ramayana epic, which describes it as the place where King Janaka found the goddess Sita.

A temple dedicated to Sita is located at Punaura Dham Sitamarhi. A rock-cut sanctuary from the Mauryan period is also found near Sitamarhi.

Several cultural events occur annually in Sitamarhi: Dumra hosts festivities for Rama Navami each spring; a ceremony commemorating the marriage of Ram and Sita happens every year in Janaki Sthan; and the winter festival of Sama Chakeva celebrates brother-sister relationships. On the occasion of Janaki Navami, a spiritual internal circumambulation known as Antar Griha Parikrama of the city is organised by the religious trust of the Janaki Sthan. The Antar Griha Parikrama is a part of the larger Sitamarhi Dham Parikrama.

== Demographics ==
As of the 2011 Census, Sitamarhi District has a total population of around 106,093. There are around 56,693 males and 49,400 females. 69,507 people are literate, including 39,537 males and 29,070 females. The average literacy rate is 52.04% in total, 60.64% for males, and 42.41% for females. The sex ratio is 899, and the child sex ratio is 872.

Religion in Sitamarhi (2011)
Religion	Percent
Hinduism	80.06%
Islam	17.23%
Buddhism	1.28%
Jainism	0.45%
Christianity	0.14%
Sikhism	0.01%
Others	0.22%

== Administration ==
Sitamarhi is a part of the Tirhut Division. Currently, Sitamarhi consists of three sub-divisions and seventeen blocks. Its headquarters are located at Dumra, five kilometers south of Sitamarhi. The District Magistrate is the top-most official of revenue and civil administration and is assisted by ADM and other district officers.

The district has been divided into three subdivisions: Sadar, Pupri, and Belsand. Each is headed by sub-divisional officers either from the IAS (Indian Administrative Service) or BAS (Bihar Administrative Service). Sub-divisional officers are under the direct authority of the District Magistrate. Subdivisions are divided into 17 development blocks where BDOs (Block Development Officers) are charged with carrying out development and welfare projects. Sitamarhi district has 845 revenue villages. The district's judicial system is headed by the District and Sessions Judge, who is in turn assisted by other Judges and Munsiff magistrates posted at district and sub-division levels.

== Pilgrimage sites ==
- Sita Kund
- Urvija Kund
- Janaki Sthan
- Janaki Janmsthali Mandir
- Punaura Dham
- Haleshwar Sthan
- Manokamna Dham, Bariyarpur
- Kumari Bua, Sundargama
- Hanuman Mandir, Sundargama
- Kali Mandir, Sundargama
- Paakar Tree, Panth Pakar
- Gaya Babu Temple Complex, Dayanagar
- Shiv Mandir, Dhangar
- Baudhi Devi, Dhangar
- Shiv Temple, Anhari

== Transportation ==
National Highway 227 connects Sitamarhi to Sheohar and Mehsi, Bihar, and other roads connect the city and National Highway 77 connects Sitamarhi to Muzaffarpur and Patna, and other roads connect the city to adjoining districts. State highways link Sitamarhi to Madhubani district in the east.

Sitamarhi Junction railway station is a five-platform station on the Darbhanga–Raxaul–Narkatiaganj line, which was converted to broad gauge in February 2014. Another broad-gauge track connects Sitamarhi to Muzaffarpur. Direct train services are available from Sitamarhi Junction to cities including New Delhi, Kolkata, Varanasi, Lucknow, Guwahati, Hyderabad, Kanpur, and Mumbai.

The nearest airport to Sitamarhi is the Darbhanga Airport, about 82 kilometres (51 mi) away.

Sitamarhi is connected to cities in and around Bihar by state-owned transport services. Many private buses (both AC and non-AC) operate between Sitamarhi and Patna.

== Notable people ==
- Thakur Jugal Kishore Sinha, former Member of Parliament, freedom fighter, and father of the co-operative movement in India
- Harnandan Prasad, ICS, zamindar, commissioner and vice chairman of Sitamarhi
- Ramcharitra Rai Yadav, freedom fighter, veteran socialist leader, and former member of both the Bihar Legislative Assembly and the Indian Legislative Assembly
- Ram Dulari Sinha, Freedom Fighter, former Union Minister and the first female to become governor from Bihar. First woman from Bihar to hold a Master's degree.
- Ramesh Thakur, former Assistant Secretary-General of the United Nations
- Jainandan Prasad Yadav, Indian politician and former member of the Bihar Legislative Assembly
- Devesh Chandra Thakur, deputy leader of the Bihar Legislative Council
- Prabhat Jha, politician and journalist
- Nawal Kishore Rai, former Member of Parliament
- Sitaram Yadav, former Member of Parliament
- Ram Kumar Sharma, former Member of Parliament
- Sunil Kumar Pintu, former Member of Parliament
- Vikash Jha, journalist and author
