= Sitamarhi Dham Parikrama =

Hindu religious circumambulation of Sitamarhi Dham in Mithila

- Official name: Sitamarhi Dham Parikrama Yatra
- Also called: सीतामढ़ी धाम परिक्रमा
- Observed by: Hinduism
- Liturgical color: Saffron
- Type: Cultural
- Significance: Grand celebration of the birth anniversary of Goddess Sita
- Celebrations: Spiritual journey in the region of Sitamarhi district
- Begins: Vaishakh Krishna Shashthi
- Ends: Janaki Navami
- Date: 7 April 2026 - 25 May 2026
- Duration: 19 days
- Frequency: Annual

Sitamarhi Dham Parikrama (Maithili: सीतामढ़ी धाम परिक्रमा) is a Hindu religious circumambulation of the sacred religious destinations around the region of Sitamarhi Dham in the Mithila region of Bihar. It is an annual periodic journey which covers the holy sites of the Sitamarhi district. The circumambulation of the Sitamarhi Dham Parikrama is associated with the birth anniversary known as Janaki Navami of Goddess Sita.

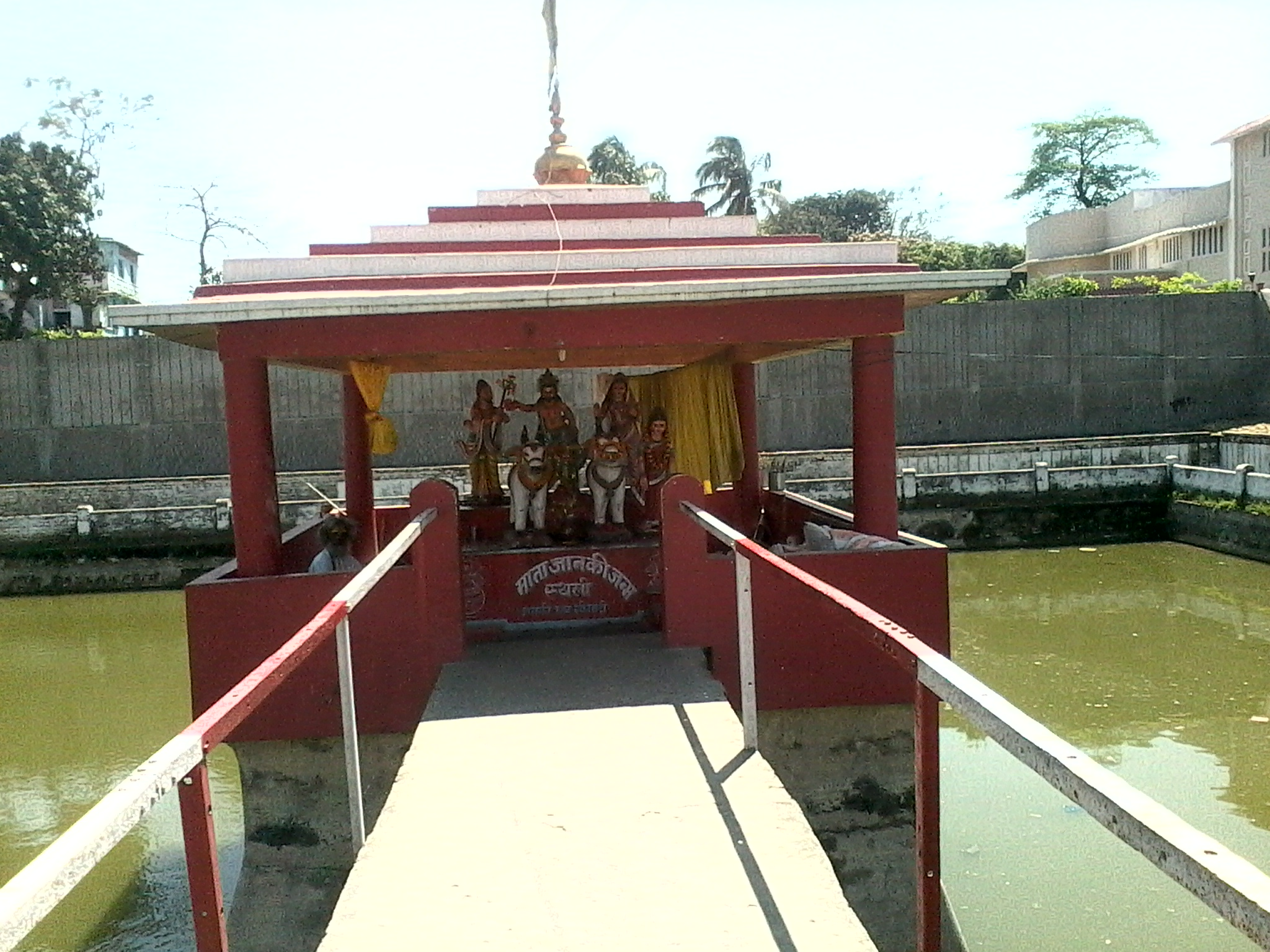
Urvija Kund at Janaki Sthan in the city of Sitamarhi where the Sitamarhi Dham Parikrama starts as well as ends.

== Description ==
The Sitamarhi Dham Parikrama Yatra is organised by the Shree Janaki Prakatya Sthali Tirtha Kshetra Trust in Sitamarhi. It is also known as Chaudha Kosi Parikrama which translates to "The fourteen kosi circumambulation". The term Kosi is the unit of large distance used in religious language. The Sitamarhi Dham Parikrama Yatra is a 19 days journey in the region of Sitamarhi district. The circumambulation starts on the day of Vaishakh Krishna Shashthi from the Urvija Kund at the Janaki Sthan in the city of Sitamarhi. In the circumambulation a decorated dola (sedan) of Goddess Janaki is carried out from the Urvija Kund and is circumambulated in the whole journey. The first stop of this journey is at the Shiv Mandir of Rajopatti village, where devotees, Sadhus and Saints are welcomed by drinks of sharbat. After the completion of the whole journey, it ends at the same place Urvija Kund of the Janaki Sthan on the day of Janaki Navami. In the year 2022, it was the 77th Janaki Doli Parikrama Yatra of Sitamarhi Dham. In the year 2026, it was the 81st parikrama. In the Parikrama, the Dola of Goddess Janaki from the birth place of Janaki, receives a grand welcome from place to place. In the Parikrama Yatra, Bhandaras are organized for Sadhu-Saints and devotees at different locations in the holy path and parava(stops) of the journey. In the villages of the holy path, arrangements are made for children's feasts, rajbhogs, snacks, fruits and sharbats by the villagers on the path. In the village where Dola rests for a night, there Bhajan Kirtan, Shree Rama Katha, discussion on Goddess Sita's character and congratulatory songs are sung by the travellers, devotees and Sadhu-Sants taking part in the Parikrama. On the day of Janaki Navami, the internal circumambulation of the Sitamarhi city known as Antar Griha Parikrama is conducted and finally the Parikrama end at the Urvija Kund by celebrating the grand ceremony of Janaki Navami there.

== Related places ==
Urvija Kund is the central location in the circular path of the holy journey Sitamarhi Dham Parikrama. It is the starting as well as ending location of the holy path of the Parikrama. The next location after Urvija Kund is the Shiva Mandir of the Rajopatti village.

After reaching Baghi Mutt from Hanuman Mandir located in Riga Mill Chowk, Parikrama Yatra is given a grand welcome at the Baghi Mutt. The other destinations in the path of the sacred journey are Simra, Beli Methaura, Bakhri, Old Bagmati Coast, Patti, Kushmari, Baghi Dham, Parashurampur, Rewasi, Jhalsi, Prarashurampur, Kishanpur, Maibi, Bathnaha, Koili, Rikhauli, Bhataulia, Radsalpur, Lagma and Madhuvan.

In the internal circumambulation called as Antar Griha Parikrama of the city, Ring Bandh, Sitamarhi railway station, Sita Ghat, Shankar Mandir, Mehsaul Chowk, Paswan Chowk, Basushree Chowk of the city are covered and at last the Parikrama finally ends at the Janaki Mandir of the Janaki Sthan.

== Religious significance ==
According to the text Vishnu Purana, the tradition of spiritual Parikrama has an important place in Hinduism. It is connected to the Sanatana Dharma and signifies that Dharma is awakening. The circumambulation of the Sitamarhi Dham Parikrama is organized so that all beings can have darshan of Goddess Sita. It also promotes the auspicious festival of Janaki Navami and the sacred birthplace Janaki Sthan of Goddess Sita.

== See also ==
- Ram Janmabhoomi, Rama's birthplace
- Janakpur Dham, Sita's birthplace in Nepal
- Punaura Dham, Sita's birthplace in India
- Krishna Janmasthan Temple Complex, Krishna's birthplace
- Kundinapuri, Rukmini's birthplace
- Kaundinyapur, near Nagpur and associated with Rukmini's birthplace Kundinapuri
- Raval, Uttar Pradesh, Radha's birthplace
- Parikrama
- Mithila Madhya Parikrama
- Yatra
