= Pupri Assembly constituency =

Coordinates: 26°29′13″N 85°40′20″E

Pupri
- Former constituency for the Bihar Legislative Assembly

Constituency details
- Country: India
- Region: East India
- State: Bihar
- District: Sitamarhi
- Lok Sabha constituency: Sitamarhi
- Established: 1977
- Abolished: 2010

Pupri Assembly constituency was an assembly constituency in Sitamarhi district in the Indian state of Bihar. Nearest railway station is [Janakpur Road].

== Overview ==
It was part of Sitamarhi Lok Sabha constituency.

As a consequence of the orders of the Delimitation Commission of India, Pupri Assembly constituency ceased to exist in 2010.

== Election results ==
=== 1977-2005 ===
In the October 2005 and February 2005 state assembly elections, Shahid Ali Khan of Janata Dal (United) won the 72 Pupri assembly seat, defeating his nearest rivals, Ram Dulari Devi and Nawal Kishore Rai, both of Rashtriya Janata Dal, in respective years. Contests in most years were multi cornered but only winners and runners are being mentioned. Sitaram Yadav of RJD defeated Habib Ahmad Birari of JD(U) in 2000. Sitaram Yadav representing Janata Dal defeated Ram Briksh Chaudhary representing Samata Party in 1995 and representing Congress in 1990. Ram Briksh Chaudhary of Congress defeated Sitaram Yadav of Lok Dal in 1985 and Sudama Devi of Congress in 1980. Habib Ahmad Birari of Janata Party defeated Ram Briksh Chaudhary of Congress in 1977.
