= Shahid Ali Khan =

Shahid Ali Khan may refer to:

- Shahid Ali Khan (field hockey), Pakistani field hockey player
- Shahid Ali Khan (singer), Pakistani-Canadian Qawwali singer
- Shahid Ali Khan (politician), Indian politician

== See also ==
- Shahid Ali (disambiguation)
