= Morsand =

- village
- Location in Bihar, India Morsand (India)
- Coordinates: 26.66987°N 85.48702°E
- Country: India
- State: Bihar
- District: Sitamarhi

Government
  - Body: Gram panchayat raj morsand
  - Rank: 2nd

Population (2011)
  - Total: 9,520

Languages
  - Official: Maithili, Hindi
- Time zone: UTC+5:30 (IST)
- PIN: 843328
- Telephone code: (+91)6226
- Nearest city: Sitamarhi
- Lok Sabha constituency: Sitamarhi
- Vidhan Sabha constituency: Runnisaidpur
- Civic agency: Gram panchayat raj morsand

Morsand is a village in Sitamarhi district, Bihar state, India. It is situated 18 km. to the southeast of the town of Sitamarhi on the banks of the river - Lakhandei, and is connected to the district headquarters via National Highway 77 Sitamarhi- Hajipur. The nearest railway stations are Sitamarhi (about 18 km) and Muzaffarpur (about 35 km), and the nearest airport is in Patna (about 110 km). A relatively new railway station is established in the village itself with the name "Runni Saidpur", which will be providing rail connectivity from this village to the rest of India.

The average height of the village from sea level is 75 meters. There are a number of temples in the village, three of which are devoted to Lord Rama-janki and Hanuman. Most of the people here are religious. Being in the Mithila region, people of Morsand treat Goddess Sita as their sister and Lord Rama as brother-in-law.

People of this village believed to be migrated from Maner. So they are also called "maneria".

== Culture ==
It is located in at the confluence of Mithila and Vajji (Licchvians). Most of the people are either Maithils or Vajji.

== Education ==
The village is famous for its standard of education in the district. The students from this village are frequently admitted to prestigious institutions of India, like AIIMS, JIPMER, SMVDU, NIT, Indian Institutes of Technology, BSF, Air Force. There are many engineers, architects and doctors from this village. There are a number of government and private schools which provide high-quality education to the students of Morsand and the nearby villages.

The literacy rate of Morsand village is 71.12% out of which 79.68% males and 61.87% females are literate. There are about 1,867 houses in Morsand village.

It is noted that there exists "a person who has teaching profession" within almost every family.

== Agricultural Products ==
The most important agricultural products harvested in the area are sugarcane, rice, wheat, lentils, maize, pointed gourd, potatoes, bananas, onions, mangoes and milk. Apart from the products listed, the area is a major producer of sugarcane, tobacco and other cash crops. Sunflowers and mustard are also grown in this area. Many agriculture based industries exist within the area.

== Festivals ==
Festivals celebrated in the village include Jhula (in the month of sawan), Chhath, Diwali, Durgapuja and Holi. The major festival of this area is Chhath puja in which people offer their prayer to Lord Sun. Holi and Diwali are other two festivals celebrated. Other festivals such as Dusshera and Makar Sankranti are also celebrated commonly. It is noted that the festivals in the area are celebrated with great emphasis on enjoyment, cooperation and brotherhood. Sawan mela on the banks of lakhandai is worth watching. On this day, girls play Sama for the last time in the month of Karthik. The Balusahi sweetmeat of Runni saidpur is a famous local delicacy used by villagers within the area in festivals.

== How to reach ==
The town is 35 km from Muzaffarpur, which is the biggest city of north Bihar and 25 km from Sitamarhi, its district headquarters. 24 hour bus service offered both by private operators and the government, run BSRTC buses to provide connectivity to the village from Muzaffarpur, Patna and Sitamarhi. The village is also connected to the train route. Daily passenger trains from Sitamarhi and Muzaffarpur have a stoppage at the railway station Runni Saidpur in the village.

== Notable people ==
Mr. Abhay Kumar Singh
