= Shahid Ali =

Shahid Ali may refer to:

- Agha Shahid Ali (1949–2001), India-born American poet
- Shahid Ali Khan (field hockey) (born 1964), Pakistan field hockey player
- Shahid Ali Khan (singer), Pakistan-born singer
- Shahid Ali Khan (politician) (fl. 2005–2016), Indian politician
- Shahed Ali Patwary (Bengali: শহীদ আলী পাটোয়ারী; 1899–1958), Bangladeshi politician; Deputy Speaker of East Pakistan Assembly

== See also ==
- Shahid Ali Khan (disambiguation)
