= Nagendra Prasad Yadav =

Indian politician (born 1929)

Member of Parliament, Lok Sabha
- In office 1962–1977
- Preceded by: J. B. Kripalani
- Succeeded by: Shyam Sunder Das
- Constituency: Sitamarhi, Bihar

Personal details
- Born: 16 August 1929 Chakmahila, Sitamarhi, Bihar, British India
- Party: Indian National Congress
- Spouse: Vidyawati Dev

Nagendra Prasad Yadav (born 16 August 1929) is an Indian politician. He was elected to the lower House of the Indian Parliament the Lok Sabha from Sitamarhi, Bihar as a member of the Indian National Congress.
