= Awadhesh Narain Singh =

Indian politician

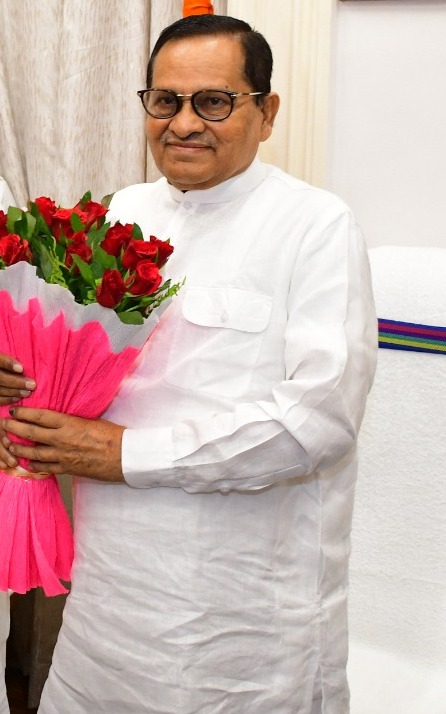
- Portrait of Singh

Chairperson of Bihar Legislative Council
- In office 20 June 2024 – 28 September 2026
- Deputy: Ram Bachan Rai
- Chief Minister: Nitish Kumar; Samrat Chaudhary
- Preceded by: Devesh Chandra Thakur
- In office 16 June 2020 - 25 August 2022
- Preceded by: Haroon Rashid
- Succeeded by: Devesh Chandra Thakur
- In office 8 August 2012 – 8 May 2017
- Preceded by: Tarakant Jha
- Succeeded by: Haroon Rashid

Minister of Labour Resources Government of Bihar
- In office 13 April 2008 – 26 November 2010
- Chief Minister: Nitish Kumar
- Preceded by: Sushil Kumar Modi
- Succeeded by: Janardan Singh Sigriwal

Member of Bihar Legislative Council
- Incumbent
- Assumed office 18 March 1993
- Constituency: Gaya( Graduates constituency)

Personal details
- Born: 22 June 1948 (age 78) Kothua, Bhojpur district, India
- Party: Bharatiya Janata Party
- Children: Four Sons; One Daughter
- Parent: Sri Keshav Prasad Singh
- Education: B. Sc. Engineering
- Alma mater: Ranchi University
- Occupation: Politician

Awadhesh Narain Singh is a leader of Bharatiya Janata Party from Bihar. He is a former chairperson of Bihar Legislative Council and a former minister. He was appointed to the cabinet in Nitish Kumar's second term as Chief Minister of Bihar in 2008.
