= Devesh Chandra Thakur =

Indian politician

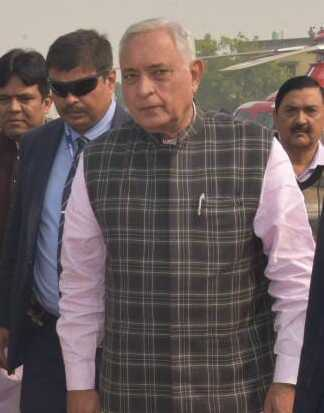

Member of Parliament, Lok Sabha
- Incumbent
- Assumed office 4 June 2024
- Preceded by: Sunil Kumar Pintu
- Constituency: Sitamarhi

Chairman of Bihar Legislative Council
- In office 25 August 2022 – 14 June 2024
- Governor: Rajendra Arlekar; Phagu Chauhan
- Chief Minister: Nitish Kumar
- Preceded by: Awadhesh Narain Singh
- Succeeded by: Awadhesh Narain Singh

Minister of Disaster Management, Cabinet Minister, Government of Bihar
- In office 2008–2008
- Governor: R. S. Gavai; R. L. Bhatia
- Chief Minister: Nitish Kumar
- Ministry and Departments: Disaster Management

Member of Bihar Legislative Council
- In office 2002 – 14 June 2024
- Succeeded by: Banshidhar Brajwasi
- Constituency: Tirhut Graduate

Personal details
- Born: 3 July 1953 (age 73) Sitamarhi
- Party: Janata Dal (United)
- Education: • Fergusson College, Pune (B.A. Honours) • ILS, Pune(L.L.B)
- Occupation: Politician; Social worker Activist
- Profession: Politician

Devesh Chandra Thakur (born 3 July 1953) is an Indian politician from the Janata Dal United, and a member of parliament representing Sitamarhi Lok Sabha constituency in Bihar, India. He is a former chairman of the Bihar Legislative Council and has served as a Cabinet Minister of Disaster Management Department in the Government of Bihar.

He served as a member of the Bihar Legislative Council and was elected four times as a member for the Bihar Legislative Council from the Tirhut Graduate Constituency, covering four districts: Sitamarhi, Muzaffarpur, Vaishali, and Sheohar. He has also served as a National Spokesperson of the Janata Dal United.

== Early life ==
He completed his early education at St. Xavier's School, Hazaribagh. Then he went to study at Sainik School in Nashik, subsequently did his B.A. Honours at Fergusson College in Pune, and later obtained a Bachelor of Law degree from ILS Law College, Pune.

He contested his first election for the Student Union of Savitribai Phule Pune University and was elected vice president of the Maharashtra Pradesh Youth Congress, where he worked closely with the late former chief minister of Maharashtra Vilasrao Deshmukh and Sushilkumar Shinde. Later, he joined a shipping company as a director, traveling to nearly 25 countries in the course of his career.

== Political career ==
He started his political career by contesting the 1990 Bihar Legislative Assembly election from the Bathnaha Assembly constituency, Sitamarhi as a candidate from the Indian National Congress but he lost to the veteran leader Suryadeo Ray and stood third place.

In 2002, he contested the Bihar Legislative Council election from Tirhut Graduate Constituency as an independent candidate and won that election.

In 2008, Thakur contested and won the Bihar Legislative Council elections from the Tirhut Graduate seat, retaining his position until 2020. He is considered an "Ajatshatru" of Tirhut politics due to his unbroken winning streak. Subsequently, he also became a cabinet minister in the Disaster Management Department of the Government of Bihar.

In 2024 Indian general election, he contested election from Sitamarhi Lok Sabha and won by defeating the RJD candidate Arjun Roy by a margin of 51,356 votes.

Thakur subsequently announced that "he won't work for Muslims and Yadavs" because they didn't vote for him. Misa Bharti criticised this statement of Thakur. BJP MP Giriraj Singh supported the statement of Thakur. Later, Thakur retracted his statement.
