= Bathnaha Assembly constituency =

Coordinates: 26°37′N 85°36′E

Bathnaha
- Constituency No. -24 for the Bihar Legislative Assembly

Constituency details
- Country: India
- Region: East India
- State: Bihar
- Established: 1967
- Total electors: 318,190
- Reservation: SC

Member of Legislative Assembly
- 18th Bihar Legislative Assembly
- Incumbent Anil Kumar
- Party: BJP
- Alliance: NDA
- Elected year: 2025

Bathnaha is an assembly constituency in Sitamarhi district in the Indian state of Bihar. It is reserved for scheduled castes. It was an open seat earlier.

== Overview ==
As per Delimitation of Parliamentary and Assembly constituencies Order, 2008, 24. Bathnaha Assembly constituency (SC) is composed of the following: Bathnaha and Majorganj community development blocks; Bagha, Khap Khopraha, Marpa, Kanhauli, Kachor, Bhutahi, Madhesra, Ghurghura, Hanuman Nagar and Bishanpur Gonahi gram panchayats of Sonbarsha CD Block.

Bathnaha Assembly constituency is part of 5. Sitamarhi (Lok Sabha constituency).

== Members of the Legislative Assembly ==
| Year | Name | Party |
|---|---|---|
| 1967 | Mohan Lal Sharma | Samyukta Socialist Party |
| 1969 | Ram Bahadur Singh | Indian National Congress |
| 1972 | Paturi Singh | Indian National Congress (O) |
| 1977 | Suryadeo Rai | Indian National Congress |
| 1980 | Suryadeo Rai | Indian National Congress (U) |
| 1985 | Ram Niwas | Indian National Congress |
| 1990 | Suryadeo Rai | Janata Dal |
| 1995 | Suryadeo Rai | Janata Dal |
| 2000 | Suryadeo Rai | Rashtriya Janata Dal |
| 2005 | Nagina Devi | Lok Janshakti Party |
| 2005 | Nagina Devi | Lok Janshakti Party |
| 2010 | Dinkar Ram | Bharatiya Janata Party |
| 2015 | Dinkar Ram | Bharatiya Janata Party |
| 2020 | Anil Kumar | Bharatiya Janata Party |
| 2025 | Anil Kumar | Bharatiya Janata Party |

== Election results ==
=== 2025 ===
2025 Bihar Legislative Assembly election: Bathnaha
| Party | Candidate | Votes | % | ±% |
|---|---|---|---|---|
| BJP | Anil Kumar | 123,698 | 57.47 | ▲3.32 |
| INC | Naveen Kumar | 71,929 | 33.42 | ▲6.63 |
| JSP | Naval Kishor Chaudhary | 5,282 | 2.45 | |
| Independent | Pramod Baitha | 1,972 | 0.92 | |
| NOTA | None of the above | 3,807 | 1.77 | ▼1.29 |
| Majority | | 51,769 | 24.05 | ▼3.31 |
| Turnout | | 215,256 | 67.65 | ▲11.96 |
| BJP hold | | Swing | NDA | |

=== 2020 ===
2020 Bihar Legislative Assembly election: Bathnaha
| Party | Candidate | Votes | % | ±% |
|---|---|---|---|---|
| BJP | Anil Kumar | 92,648 | 54.15 | ▲5.04 |
| INC | Sanjay Ram | 45,830 | 26.79 | ▼9.07 |
| RLSP | Chandrika Paswan | 15,322 | 8.96 | |
| Independent | Vijay Kumar Baitha | 2,890 | 1.69 | |
| Independent | Lalu Das | 2,482 | 1.45 | |
| Independent | Ramphl Sada | 1,865 | 1.09 | |
| NOTA | None of the above | 5,240 | 3.06 | ▼0.24 |
| Majority | | 46,818 | 27.36 | ▲14.11 |
| Turnout | | 171,093 | 55.69 | ▲0.65 |
| BJP hold | | Swing | | |

=== 2015 ===
2015 Bihar Legislative Assembly election: Bathnaha
| Party | Candidate | Votes | % | ±% |
|---|---|---|---|---|
| BJP | Dinkar Ram | 74,763 | 49.11 | |
| INC | Surendra Ram | 54,597 | 35.86 | |
| Independent | Deeplal Paswan Baghela | 4,318 | 2.84 | |
| RJP | Subodh Ram | 3,099 | 2.04 | |
| BSP | Manoj Ram | 2,273 | 1.49 | |
| Independent | Sadhu Sharan Das | 2,151 | 1.41 | |
| BMP | Indal Paswan | 1,763 | 1.16 | |
| NOTA | None of the above | 5,028 | 3.3 | |
| Majority | | 20,166 | 13.25 | |
| Turnout | | 152,233 | 55.04 | |
