= Sitaram Yadav (politician, born 1946) =

Indian politician

Member of Bihar Legislative Assembly
- In office 1990-1994

Member of Parliament 12th Lok Sabha
- In office 1998-1999
- Preceded by: Nawal Kishore Rai
- Succeeded by: Nawal Kishore Rai
- Constituency: Sitamarhi

Member of Parliament 14th Lok Sabha
- Incumbent
- Assumed office 2004-2009
- Preceded by: Nawal Kishore Rai
- Succeeded by: Arjun Roy
- Constituency: Sitamarhi

Personal details
- Born: 5 January 1946 (age 80) Sitamarhi, Bihar
- Party: Bhartiya Janata Party
- As of 25 September, 2006

Sitaram Yadav (born 5 January 1946) is an Indian politician who was a member of the 14th Lok Sabha of India. He represented the Sitamarhi constituency of Bihar as a member of the Rashtriya Janata Dal (RJD) political party.

In January 2021, he joined Bhartiya Janata Party in presence of Bhupendra Yadav and Bihar state BJP president Sanjay Jaiswal.

== Early life ==
Yadav was born in Sitamarhi, Bihar, India to Raghunandan Gope and Sundarwati Devi. He is the first in a family of five sons. He received bachelor's degrees in Law and Education from Bihar University, Muzaffarpur. After graduation, he found employment as a teacher in a Madhubani middle school.

== Political career ==
Early in his political career, Yadav served as Mukhiya of the Nayatol Panchayat and as Block Parmukh of Nanpur block.

He was elected to the Bihar Legislative Assembly from the Pupri constituency in 1990 for the Janta Dal party and was re-elected in 1995.

He was elected to the Lok Sabha from the Sitamarhi constituency in Bihar as a candidate of RJD in 1998.

He returned to state politics in 2000 to be elected to the Pupri constituency for the third time. He was sworn in as Cabinet Minister for Information, Press and Public Relations on 4 April 2000 under the Rabri Devi government.

He was re-elected to Lok Sabha from the Sitamarhi constituency as a candidate of RJD in 2004.
