= Syed Abu Dojana =

Indian politician

- Constituency: Sursand (sitamarhi)

MLA of Sursand
- In office 2015–2020
- Preceded by: Shahid Ali Khan
- Succeeded by: Dilip Kumar Ray

Personal details
- Born: Patna
- Party: Rashtriya Janata Dal
- Spouse: Nusrat Imam
- Children: Abu Maaz

Syed Abu Dojana is an Indian politician belonging to Rashtriya Janata Dal. He was elected as a member of Bihar Legislative Assembly from Sursand in 2015.
