= Dilip Kumar Ray =

Indian politician

Member of the Bihar Legislative Assembly
- In office 2020–2025
- Preceded by: Syed Abu Dojana
- Succeeded by: Nagendra Raut
- Constituency: Sursand

Personal details
- Born: 23 March 1973 (age 53)
- Party: Janata Dal (United)
- Parent: Yogendra Ray (Father)
- Education: 12th Pass
- Occupation: Politician; Social Work

Dilip Kumar Ray also spelled Dilip Ray is an Indian politician who was elected as a member of Bihar Legislative Assembly from Sursand constituency in 2020.

== Political life ==
Ray was earlier member of the Bihar Legislative Council before he won the 2020 Assembly elections.

== See also ==
- Sursand Assembly constituency
- Sitamarhi (Lok Sabha constituency)
