= Grand Democratic Secular Front =

Indian political Alliance

- Abbreviation: GDSF
- Leader: Upendra Kushwaha
- Founded: 2020
- Dissolved: 2021
- Membership: 6 Parties
- Ideology: Secularism; Socialism; Social Justice

The Grand Democratic Secular Front (GDSF) was a coalition of political parties in the Indian state of Bihar formed on 8 October 2020 after the merger of the constituents of the United Democratic Secular Alliance and a three party front. The coalition was formed in the wake of the 2020 Bihar Legislative Assembly election and consisted of 6 parties.

== History ==
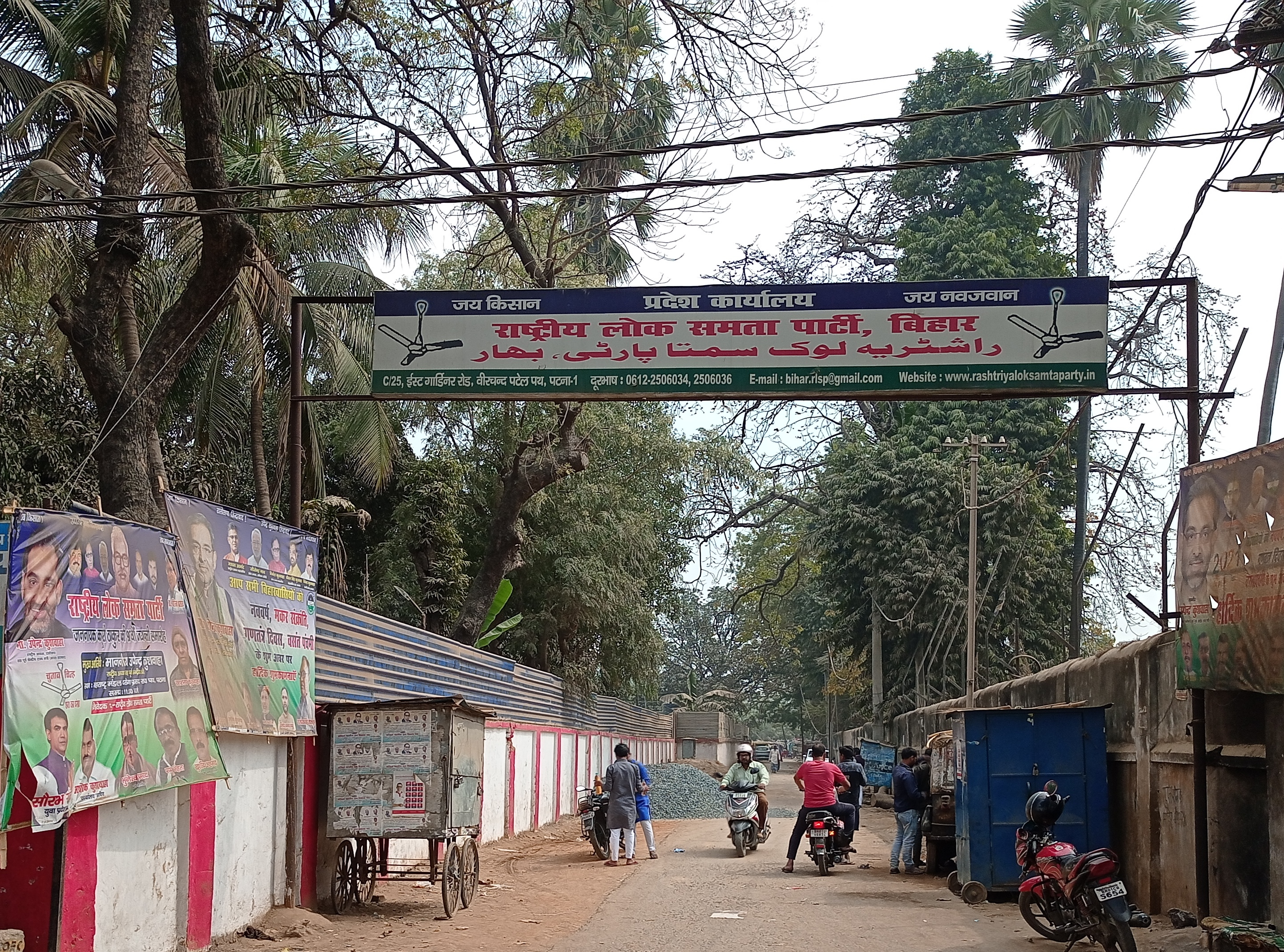
The headquarter of Rashtriya Lok Samata Party at Patna. RLSP was the leading party of the Grand Democratic Secular Front, which contested the 2020 Bihar Legislative Assembly elections with Upendra Kushwaha as the Chief Ministerial candidate.

The All India Majlis-e-Ittehadul Muslimeen announced an alliance with Samajwadi Janata Dal Democratic ahead of the 2020 elections in Bihar. RLSP, BSP and PSP declared another alliance for upcoming Bihar election. However these two separate coalition of political parties merged and formed a brand new alliance named Grand Democratic Secular Front and declared Upendra Kushwaha as its Chief Ministerial candidate for Bihar. According to its leaders, the alliance was forged to converge the Dalit, OBC and Muslim votes.

The bloc's ticket distribution plan gave due weightage to caste and communal representation in various constituencies. It was decided that the Rashtriya Lok Samta Party will contest on 104 out of 243 seats of the Bihar Assembly while Bahujan Samaj Party was to contest on 80 seats. The other members like AIMIM and Samajwadi Janata Dal were given 24 and 25 seats respectively while the minor players like Suhaldev Bhartiya Samaj Party and Janwadi Party Socialist were to contest 5-5 seats each.

In the first phase of the election RLSP contested on 42 seats. Relying upon its vote base which is Kushwaha caste, RLSP fielded 40% Kushwaha candidates in the elections . The Grand Democratic Secular Front of which RLSP was a constituent member relied primarily upon the votes of castes like Kushwahas, Ravidasis, and Muslims. RLSP in the first phase of elections contested a total of 42 seats amongst which it gave ticket to 17 candidates of Kushwaha caste while its ally AIMIM placed its candidates in Muslim dominated areas of Bihar. Similarly in the list of its 37 candidates in the second phase also Koeri candidates were dominant accounting for 18 seats.

The Grand Democratic Secular front however failed to perform as it claimed earlier in the Bihar Assembly Elections of 2020. Its only success was in obtaining six seats, five of which were won by AIMIM in the Muslim dominated Simanchal region of Bihar. The Bahujan Samaj Party also won one seat but the RLSP, the principal political party of the alliance performed badly and failed to win any seats.

=== Performance in 2020 Bihar Assembly elections ===
Alliance	Party	Popular vote			Seats		
Alliance	Party	Votes	%	±pp	Contested	Won	+/−
GDSF	AIMIM	523,279	1.24%	▲1.03%	20	5	▲5
GDSF	BSP	628,944	1.49%	▼0.60%	80	1	▲1
GDSF	RLSP	744,221	1.77%	▼0.82%	104	0	▼2
GDSF	SJDD	—N/a	—N/a	—N/a	25	0	—N/a
GDSF	SBSP	—N/a	—N/a	—N/a	5	0	—N/a
GDSF	JP-S	—N/a	—N/a	—N/a	5	0	—N/a

== Defection of legislators and dormancy ==
Following its poor performance in Bihar Assembly elections of 2020, the coalition ripped apart with its elected Member of the Legislative Assembly meeting with leaders of other political parties. Zama Khan, the single legislator from Bahujan Samaj Party joined Janata Dal (United) and was made a minister in the expanded cabinet of Nitish Kumar in 2021. The defection was followed by the attempt of JD(U) to merge the Rashtriya Lok Samata Party, which happened inevitably in 2021. The merger of RLSP into the JDU ripped the coalition apart. The coalition virtually ceased to exist after it.

== Members and status of parties during 2020 Bihar elections ==
Party	President	Portrait	MPs in Lok Sabha	MPs in Rajya Sabha	Seats in Bihar Legislative Assembly	Base State
Bahujan Samaj Party	Mayawati		10	4	0	National Party
All India Majlis-e-Ittehadul Muslimeen	Asaduddin Owaisi		2	0	5	Telangana Bihar Maharashtra
Samajwadi Janata Dal Democratic	Devendra Prasad Yadav		0	0	0	Bihar
Rashtriya Lok Samta Party	Upendra Kushwaha		0	0	0	Bihar
Suheldev Bharatiya Samaj Party	Om Prakash Rajbhar		0	0	0	Uttar Pradesh
Janvadi Party Socialist	Sanjay Singh Chauhan		0	0	0	Uttar Pradesh

== See also ==
- United Progressive Alliance
- National Democratic Alliance
- Mahagathbandhan (Bihar)
- Progressive Democratic Alliance (Bihar)
- Coalition government
