= Sursand Assembly constituency =

Coordinates: 26°39′06″N 85°40′18″E

Sursand
- Constituency No. 26 for the Bihar Legislative Assembly

Constituency details
- Country: India
- Region: East India
- State: Bihar
- Division: Tirhut
- District: Sitamarhi
- Lok Sabha constituency: Sitamarhi
- Established: 1951
- Total electors: 316,116
- Reservation: None

Member of Legislative Assembly
- 18th Bihar Legislative Assembly
- Incumbent Prof. Nagendra Raut
- Party: JD(U)
- Alliance: NDA
- Elected year: 2025
- Preceded by: Syed Abu Dojana

Sursand is an assembly constituency in Sitamarhi district in the Indian state of Bihar.

== Overview ==
As per Delimitation of Parliamentary and Assembly constituencies Order, 2008, 26. Sursand Assembly constituency is composed of the following: Sursand, Charaut, and Pupri community development blocks.

Sursand Assembly constituency is part of 5. Sitamarhi Lok Sabha constituency.

== Members of the Legislative Assembly ==
Year	Name	Party
1952	Ram Charitra Rai Yadav	Independent
1957	Maheshwar Narain Sinha	Indian National Congress
1962	Pratibha Devi	Indian National Congress
1967	Pratibha Devi	Indian National Congress
1969	Ram Charitra Rai Yadav	Indian National Congress
1972	Ram Charitra Rai Yadav	Indian National Congress
1977	Ram Charitra Rai Yadav	Indian National Congress
1980	Nagendra Prasad Yadav	Indian National Congress (I)
1985	Ravindra Prasad Sahi	Independent
1990	Ravindra Prasad Sahi	Indian National Congress
1995	Nagendra Prasad Yadav	Janata Dal
2000	Jainandan Prasad Yadav	Janata Dal (United)
2005	Jainandan Prasad Yadav	Rashtriya Janata Dal
2005	Jainandan Prasad Yadav	Rashtriya Janata Dal
2010	Shahid Ali Khan	Janata Dal (United)
2015	Syed Abu Dojana	Rashtriya Janata Dal
2020	Dilip Kumar Ray	Janata Dal (United)
2025	Nagendra Raut	Janata Dal (United)

== Election results ==
=== 2025 ===
2025 Bihar Legislative Assembly election: Sursand
Party	Candidate	Votes	%	±%
JD(U)	Nagendra Raut	104,157	50.04	+11.41
RJD	Syed Abu Dojana	80,490	38.67	+5.14
JSP	Usha Kiran	5,993	2.88	
Independent	Rajeev Nand	3,625	1.74	
Independent	Prabhat Kumar	2,310	1.11	
Independent	Manoj Kumar	1,938	0.93	
NOTA	None of the above	3,134	1.51	+0.58
Majority		23,667	11.37	+6.27
Turnout		208,144	65.84	+11.83
JD(U) hold		Swing		

=== 2020 ===
2020 Bihar Legislative Assembly election: Sursand
Party	Candidate	Votes	%	±%
JD(U)	Dilip Kumar Ray	67,193	38.63	
RJD	Syed Abu Dojana	58,317	33.53	▼0.2
LJP	Amit Choudhari	20,281	11.66	
Independent	Pappu Kumar Choudhary	6,734	3.87	
Independent	Kameshwar Thakur	3,953	2.27	
Independent	Soniya Devi	3,105	1.79	
Samajwadi Janata Dal Democratic	Naval Kishore Raut	2,330	1.34	
Bhartiya Party (Loktantrik)	Gobind Thakur	2,179	1.25	
RPI	Manoj Purbey	1,984	1.14	
Rashtriya Jan Jan Party	Anupam Kumari	1,804	1.04	
NOTA	None of the above	1,613	0.93	▼0.31
Majority		8,876	5.1	▼9.73
Turnout		173,930	54.01	▼0.66
JD(U) gain from RJD		Swing		

=== 2015 ===
2015 Bihar Legislative Assembly election: Sursand
Party	Candidate	Votes	%	±%
RJD	Syed Abu Dojana	52,857	33.73	
Independent	Amit Kumar	29,623	18.9	
Independent	Pappu Kumar Chaudhary	15,662	9.99	
HAM(S)	Shahid Ali Khan	13,954	8.9	
CPI	Nawal Kishor Raut	10,342	6.6	
Independent	Vijay Kumar	6,740	4.3	
Independent	Jai Nandan Prasad Yadav	4,301	2.74	
Independent	Uma Shankar Gupta	4,119	2.63	
Independent	Nawal Mandal	3,297	2.1	
Independent	Mahesh Kumar	2,310	1.47	
Independent	Gobind Thakur	2,131	1.36	
BMP	Satyanarayan Thakur	1,978	1.26	
SP	Manoj Purwe	1,481	0.95	
Independent	Vijay Kumar Hathi	1,473	0.94	
NOTA	None of the above	1,944	1.24	
Majority		23,234	14.83	
Turnout		156,718	54.67	
RJD gain from JD(U)		Swing		

=== 2010 ===
2010 Bihar Legislative Assembly election: Sursand
Party	Candidate	Votes	%	±%
JD(U)	Shahid Ali Khan	38,542	33.09	
RJD	Jainandan Prasad Yadav	37,356	32.07	
INC	Vimal Shukla	15,158	13.02	
CPI	Anita Raut	13,173	11.31	
BSP	Bijay Kumar Hathi	3,286	2.82	
Majority		1,186	1.02	
Turnout		116,475	50.21	
JD(U) gain from RJD		Swing		
