= Runnisaidpur Assembly constituency =

Coordinates: 26°22′59″N 85°29′0″E

Runnisaidpur
- Constituency No. 29 for the Bihar Legislative Assembly

Constituency details
- Country: India
- Region: East India
- State: Bihar
- Division: Tirhut
- District: Sitamarhi
- Lok Sabha constituency: Sitamarhi
- Established: 1951
- Total electors: 287,491
- Reservation: None

Member of Legislative Assembly
- 18th Bihar Legislative Assembly
- Incumbent Pankaj Kumar Mishra
- Party: JD(U)
- Alliance: NDA
- Elected year: 2025
- Preceded by: Mangita Devi

Runnisaidpur Assembly constituency is an assembly constituency in Sitamarhi district in the Indian state of Bihar.

== Overview ==
As per Delimitation of Parliamentary and Assembly constituencies Order, 2008, 29. Runnisaidpur Assembly constituency is composed of the following: Runni Saidpur community development block; Gaura, Mohini, Pandaul Buzurg, Bath Asli and Kauria Raipur gram panchayats of Nanpur CD Block.

Runnisaidpur Assembly constituency is part of 5. Sitamarhi Lok Sabha constituency.

== Members of the Legislative Assembly ==
Year	Name	Party
1952	Vivekanand Giri	Independent
1957	Triveni Prasad Singh	Indian National Congress
1962	Vivekanand Giri	Independent
1967	Vivekanand Giri	Indian National Congress
1969	Bhuvaneshwar Rai	Samyukta Socialist Party
1972	Triveni Prasad Singh	Indian National Congress (O)
1977	Nawal Kishore Shahi	Janata Party
1980	Vivekanand Giri	Indian National Congress (I)
1985	Nawal Kishore Shahi	Janata Party
1990	Nawal Kishore Shahi	Janata Dal
1995	Bhola Rai	Janata Dal
2000	Bhola Rai	Rashtriya Janata Dal
2005	Bhola Rai	Rashtriya Janata Dal
2005	Guddi Devi	Janata Dal (United)
2010	Guddi Devi	Janata Dal (United)
2015	Mangita Devi	Rashtriya Janata Dal
2020	Pankaj Kumar Mishra	Janata Dal (United)
2025	Pankaj Kumar Mishra	Janata Dal (United)

== Election results ==
=== 2025 ===
2025 Bihar Legislative Assembly election: Runnisaidpur
Party	Candidate	Votes	%	±%
JD(U)	Pankaj Kumar Mishra	93,672	48.5	+0.54
RJD	Chandan Kumar Yadav	73,935	38.28	+6.45
JSP	Vijay Kumar Sah	7,671	3.97	
Independent	Sanjay Kumar	3,737	1.93	
Desh Janhit Party	Imtiyaz Alam Nasir Ahmed	3,490	1.81	
BSP	Jitendra Ram	2,092	1.08	
NOTA	None of the above	4,315	2.23	−0.59
Majority		19,737	10.22	−5.91
Turnout		193,144	67.18	+14.07
JD(U) hold		Swing		

=== 2020 ===
2020 Bihar Legislative Assembly election: Runnisaidpur
Party	Candidate	Votes	%	±%
JD(U)	Pankaj Kumar Mishra	73,205	47.96	
RJD	Mangita Devi	48,576	31.83	−8.69
LJP	Guddi Devi	15,196	9.96	
JAP(L)	Lal Babu Roy	2,960	1.94	
JP(S)	Brajesh Mahto	2,611	1.71	
Independent	Luv Yadav	2,282	1.5	
Hindustan Sampoorna Azad Party	Sone Lal Sah	1,518	0.99	
NOTA	None of the above	4,310	2.82	−2.45
Majority		24,629	16.13	+5.86
Turnout		152,624	53.11	−0.48
JD(U) gain from RJD		Swing		

=== 2015 ===
2015 Bihar Legislative Assembly election: Runnisaidpur
Party	Candidate	Votes	%	±%
RJD	Mangita Devi	55,699	40.52	
RLSP	Pankaj Kumar Mishra	41,589	30.25	
SP	Guddi Devi	16,038	11.67	
Independent	Lal Babu Roy	5,024	3.65	
Independent	Vijay Kumar Sah	2,821	2.05	
CPI(M)	Devendar Prasad Yadav	1,887	1.37	
BSP	Shyam Babu Yadav	1,520	1.11	
NOTA	None of the above	7,249	5.27	
Majority		14,110	10.27	
Turnout		137,464	53.59	
