= Guddi =

Guddi (lit. 'doll') may refer to:

- Guddi (1961 film), an Indian Punjabi-language film
- Guddi (1971 film), an Indian Hindi-language film
- Guddi (TV series), a 2022 Indian Bengali-language TV series
- Guddi Devi, Indian politician
- Guddi Maruti, an Indian film and television actress

== See also ==
- Guddi Gudda, a 1956 Indian film
