= Samajwadi Janata Dal =

The Samajwadi Janata Dal was a proposed name for a political organisation in India. JD(U), RJD, Samajwadi Janata Party, INLD, JD(S) and Samajwadi Party were in talks to join to form a party which is expected to be named Samajwadi Janata Dal.

The rising power of the BJP is forcing the erstwhile Janata Dal partners to come together.

Since Samajwadi Party has the highest number of MPs amongst the six parties, its leader Mulayam Singh Yadav is expected to lead the combined "Samajwadi Janata Dal".

Main members of the expected samajwadi janata dal are K. C. Tyagi, Sharad Yadav, Mulayam Singh Yadav, Nitish Kumar, Lalu Prasad Yadav, H.D. Deve Gowda and O. P. Chautala.

In a meeting convened by Mulayam Singh Yadav on 15 April 2015, the leaders announced the merger of their parties declaring Mulayam Singh Yadav as the President as well as the Chief of the Parliamentary Board. However, the name, flag, and election symbol of the party is yet to be announced. A six-member committee of all party presidents of the six parties agreeing to merge has been formed to decide on these issues.

== See also ==
- Janata Parivar
- Samajwadi Janata Dal Democratic
