= Janaki Sthan =

Hindu temple in Sitamarhi, India

- जानकी स्थान
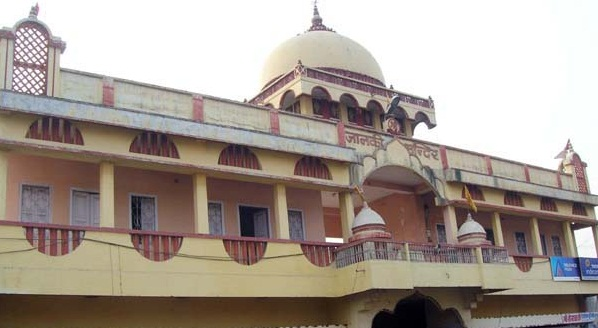
- Janaki Sthan Mandir, Sitamarhi

Religion
- Affiliation: Hinduism
- Sect: Ramanuj Sampradaya
- District: Sitamarhi district
- Region: Mithila region
- Deity: Sita
- Festival: Janaki Navami

Location
- Location: Sitamarhi
- Country: India

Architecture
- Established: 1599

Janaki Sthan ( Sanskrit: जानकी स्थान ) is a historical place related to the temple of Goddess Sita in the city of Sitamarhi. According to some scholars and saints, Janaki Sthan is claimed to be the place where Goddess Sita manifested in Ramayana. This temple is called Janaki Sthan Mandir. This temple is about 2 kilometers away from Sitamarhi Railway Station. It comes under Ramanuja tradition in Hinduism.

== Description ==
Janaki Sthan Mandir is much older than the Janaki Temple in Janakpur. According to a court document, in 1599, the land under Janaki Sthan was donated to the Janaki temple in Sitamarhi city by King Narpati Singh of Raj Darbhanga. Its founder is believed to be Hiraram Das of Revasa Math of Rajasthan. According to a case filed in Patna High Court in 1923 regarding this Math, the name of its first Mahant was Hiram and he was said to be a resident of Misraula village of Shahabad.

== Disputes between Janaki Sthan and Punauradham ==
The manifestation ( birth ) place of Goddess Sita has been a long-standing controversy. Some scholars say that her birthplace is Janaki Sthan located while others locate it at Punauradham. Both places offer Janaki temples as well as Kunds. The Kund at Punauradham is called Sita Kund or Janaki Kund while the Kund at Janaki Sthan is called Urvija Kund. Mahant Vinod Das points to Janaki Sthan. A tradition of Guru-Shishya persists there. After the death of Guru, Shishya was assigned as Mahant. After the death of a certain Mahant during British India, two of his disciples both claimed to be the Mahant. The Privy Council of London gave verdict in the favor of Janaki Sthan. The second disciple went to Pundarik Ashram at Punauradham and built a temple there. That temple later became Ram Janaki Mandir. Sage Pundarik may have had an ashram in Punaura where he used to meditate. In the 19th century, Birla Group wanted to renovate the Janaki Sthan Mandir, but the then Mahant did not allow this fearing that the temple would be named Birla Mandir. Then Birla's team switched to Punauradham and renovated the Ram Janaki Mandir there.

According to Dr Balwant Shastri, a member of Hindi Rajbhasha Samiti, the birthplace of Goddess Sita is Janaki Sthan. According to him, the Punauradham was the ashram of sage Pundrika and not the birthplace of Goddess Sita. He cited the text Ramayana for his claim.

== Celebrations and festivals ==
Every year the religious trust of the temple organises a spiritual journey known as Sitamarhi Dham Parikrama on the occasion of Janaki Navami which covers the major Hindu religious centres in region of the Sitamarhi district of the Mithila region in Bihar.
