= Sitamarhi Lok Sabha constituency =

Constituency of the Indian parliament in Bihar

Coordinates: 26.6°N 85.5°E

Sitamarhi
- Lok Sabha constituency

Constituency details
- Country: India
- Region: East India
- State: Bihar
- Assembly constituencies: Bathnaha; Parihar; Sursand; Bajpatti; Sitamarhi; Runnisaidpur
- Established: 1957
- Reservation: None

Member of Parliament
- 18th Lok Sabha
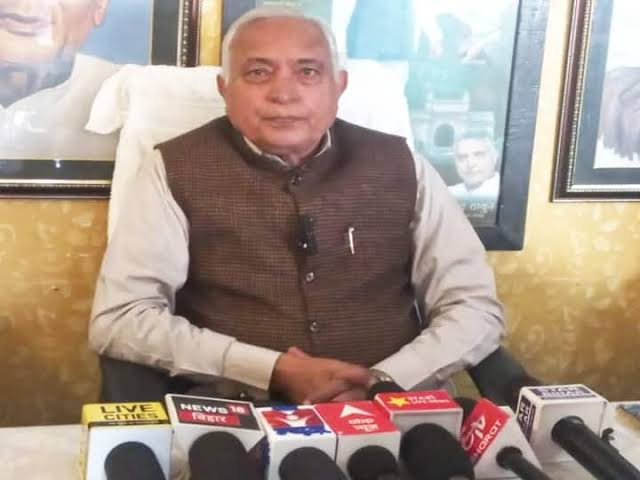
- Incumbent Devesh Chandra Thakur
- Party: JD(U)
- Alliance: NDA
- Elected year: 2024

Sitamarhi is one of the 40 Lok Sabha (parliamentary) constituencies in Bihar state in eastern India.

== Assembly segments ==
Presently, Sitamarhi Lok Sabha constituency comprises the following six Vidhan Sabha segments:

#	Name	District	Member	Party	2024 lead
24	Bathnaha (SC)	Sitamarhi	Anil Ram	BJP	JD(U)
25	Parihar	Sitamarhi	Gayatri Yadav	BJP	RJD
26	Sursand	Sitamarhi	Nagendra Raut	JD(U)	JD(U)
27	Bajpatti	Sitamarhi	Rameshwar Mahto	RLM	JD(U)
28	Sitamarhi	Sitamarhi	Sunil Kumar Pintu	BJP	JD(U)
29	Runnisaidpur	Sitamarhi	Pankaj Mishra	JD(U)	JD(U)

== Members of Parliament ==
Year	Name	Party
1957	J. B. Kripalani	Praja Socialist Party
1962	Nagendra Prasad Yadav	Indian National Congress
1967	Nagendra Prasad Yadav	Indian National Congress
1971	Nagendra Prasad Yadav	Indian National Congress
1977	Shyam Sunder Das	Janata Party
1980	Bali Ram Bhagat	Indian National Congress (U)
1984	Ram Shreshth Khirhar	Indian National Congress
1989	Hukumdeo Narayan Yadav	Janata Dal
1991	Nawal Kishore Rai	Janata Dal
1996	Nawal Kishore Rai	Janata Dal
1998	Sitaram Yadav	Rashtriya Janata Dal
1999	Nawal Kishore Rai	Janata Dal (United)
2004	Sitaram Yadav	Rashtriya Janata Dal
2009	Arjun Ray	Janata Dal (United)
2014	Ram Kumar Sharma	Rashtriya Lok Samata Party
2019	Sunil Kumar Pintu	Janata Dal (United)
2024	Devesh Chandra Thakur	Janata Dal (United)

== Election results ==
=== 2024 ===
2024 Indian general elections: Sitamarhi
Party	Candidate	Votes	%	±%
JD(U)	Devesh Chandra Thakur	515,719	47.14	
RJD	Arjun Ray	4,64,363	42.45	
Independent	Saiqua Nawaz Azmat	28,912	2.64	
NOTA	NOTA	32,133	2.94	
Majority		51,356	4.69	
Turnout		10,96,960	56.25	
JD(U) hold		Swing		

=== 2019 ===
2019 Indian general elections: Sitamarhi
Party	Candidate	Votes	%	±%
JD(U)	Sunil Kumar Pintu	567,745	54.65	
RJD	Arjun Ray	3,17,206	30.53	
IND.	Dharmendra Kumar	20,487	1.97	
IND.	Vinod Sah	17,724	1.71	
IND.	Mahesh Nandan Singh	17,270	1.66	
IND.	Ramesh Kumar Mishra	11,056	1.06	
Majority		2,50,539	24.12	
Turnout		10,39,600	59.32	
JD(U) gain from RLSP		Swing		

=== 2014 ===
2014 Indian general elections: Sitamarhi
Party	Candidate	Votes	%	±%
RLSP	Ram Kumar Sharma	4,11,265	45.67	+45.67
RJD	Sitaram Yadav	2,63,300	29.24	+8.64
JD(U)	Arjun Ray	97,188	10.79	−29.57
IND.	Mahesh Nandan Singh	20,613	2.29	+2.29
AAP	Kishori Das	18,043	2.00	+2.00
AITC	Rajeev Ranjan	11,250	1.25	+1.25
Majority		1,47,965	16.43	
Turnout		9,00,588	57.18	
RLSP gain from JD(U)		Swing		

== See also ==
- Sitamarhi district
- List of constituencies of the Lok Sabha
