= Sunil Kushwaha =

Indian politician

Sunil Kumar

Member of the Bihar Legislative Assembly
- In office 2015–2020
- Preceded by: Sunil Kumar Pintu
- Succeeded by: Mithilesh Kumar
- Constituency: Sitamarhi

Personal details
- Born: VILL-Warispur, Dharmwana Bishanpur, Muhchhti, P.O-Lagma Aajam Gadh, P.S-Dumra, DISTT- Sitamarhi
- Party: Rashtriya Janata Dal

Sunil Kumar also called Sunil Kushwaha is a former Member of Bihar Legislative Assembly from Sitamarhi Assembly constituency.He is district President of Rashtriya Janta Dal Sitamarhi .He was elected to Bihar Assembly from this constituency in 2015 Bihar Assembly elections, as a candidate of Rashtriya Janata Dal. In this election, he defeated the second runner-up, Sunil Kumar Pintu of Bhartiya Janata Party. In the 2015 elections, Kumar secured 81,557 votes, and the margin of his victory was nine percent votes more than his opponent. In 2020 Bihar Assembly elections, Kumar was pitted against Mithilesh Kumar of Bhartiya Janata Party; latter was able to defeat him with a margin of 11,475 votes. It was believed by the poll strategists that Kumar would get the votes from Other Backward Class and Muslims, while his opponent would be supported by Forward Castes. However, in the final counting of votes, Kumar was defeated.
