= Urvija Kund =

Coordinates: 26.5923°N 85.4839°E

- उर्विजा कुंड (Maithili)
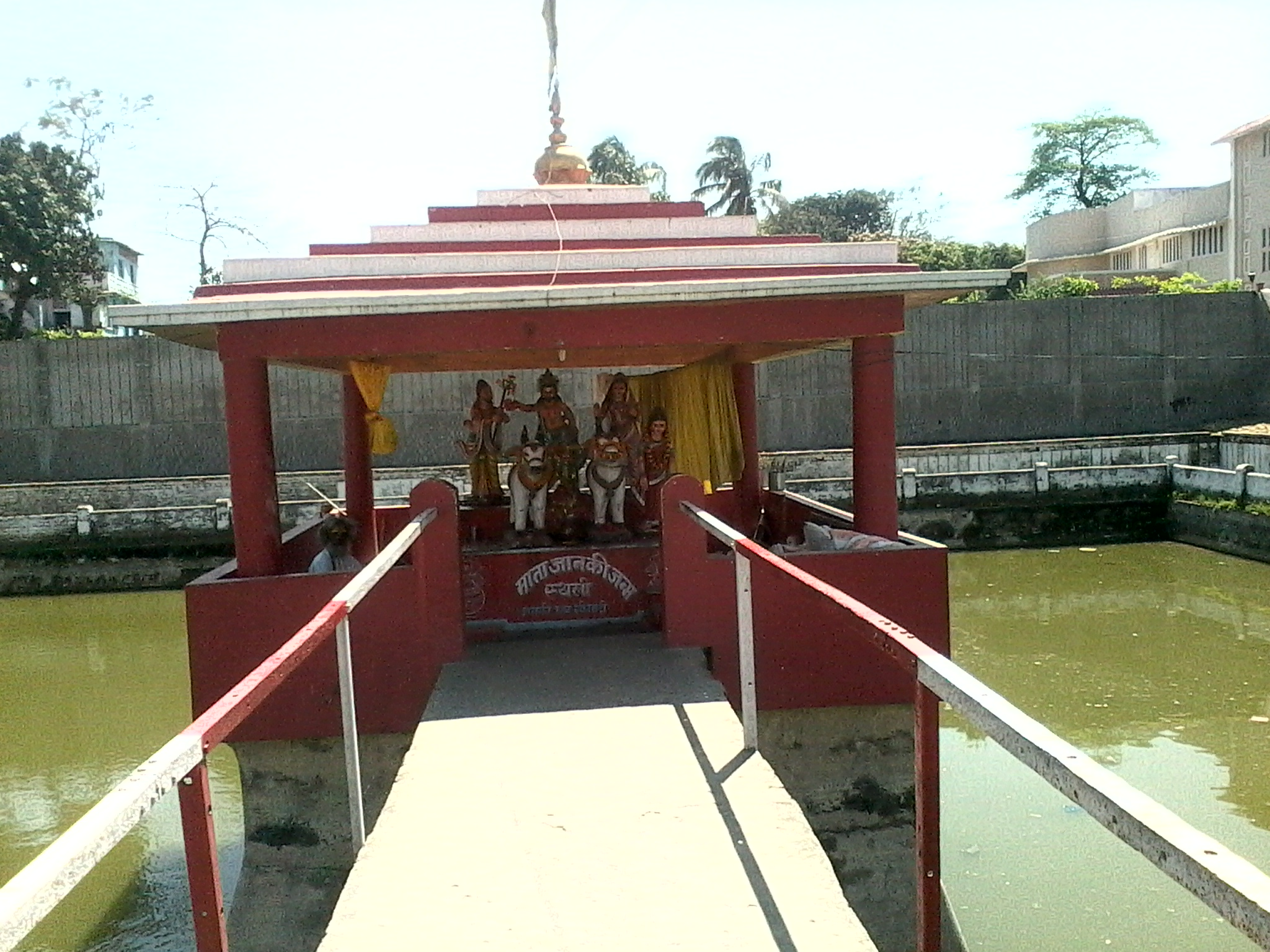
- Urvija Kund
- Interactive map of Urvija Kund
- Location: Janaki Sthan, Sitamarhi, Bihar, India

History
- Built for: religious site

Urvija Kund ( Sanskrit: उर्विजा कुंड ) is a pond in Bihar, India, said to be related the Hindu goddess Janaki (Sita) which is described in the Ramayana, legendary stories, and folk tales. It is believed that King Janaka built a pond at a place where the Hindu goddess Sita appeared, which was later known as Urvija Kund.

== Description ==
There are two ponds in Sitamarhi, one in Punaura Dham and the other in Janaki Sthan. Both ponds are considered sacred, one is the pond where Sita manifested herself as Janaki and the other is the pond where she bathed. There is dispute and confusion between the two Kunds. According to some scholars, it is believed that Janaki appeared in the Urvija Kund of Janaki Sthan. According to others, the Janaki Kund at Punaura Dham is the real Urvija Kund. The Kund at Janaki Sthan in the city of Sitamarhi is called Urvija Kund. According to tradition, on the Vaishakh Shukla Shashthi, a 19-day spiritual circumambulation known as Sitamarhi Dham Parikrama Yatra is started from Urvija Kund situated at Janaki Sthan with Janaki Doli, in which saints and devotees participate. The circumambulation is organised to celebrate the grand festival of Janaki Navami.

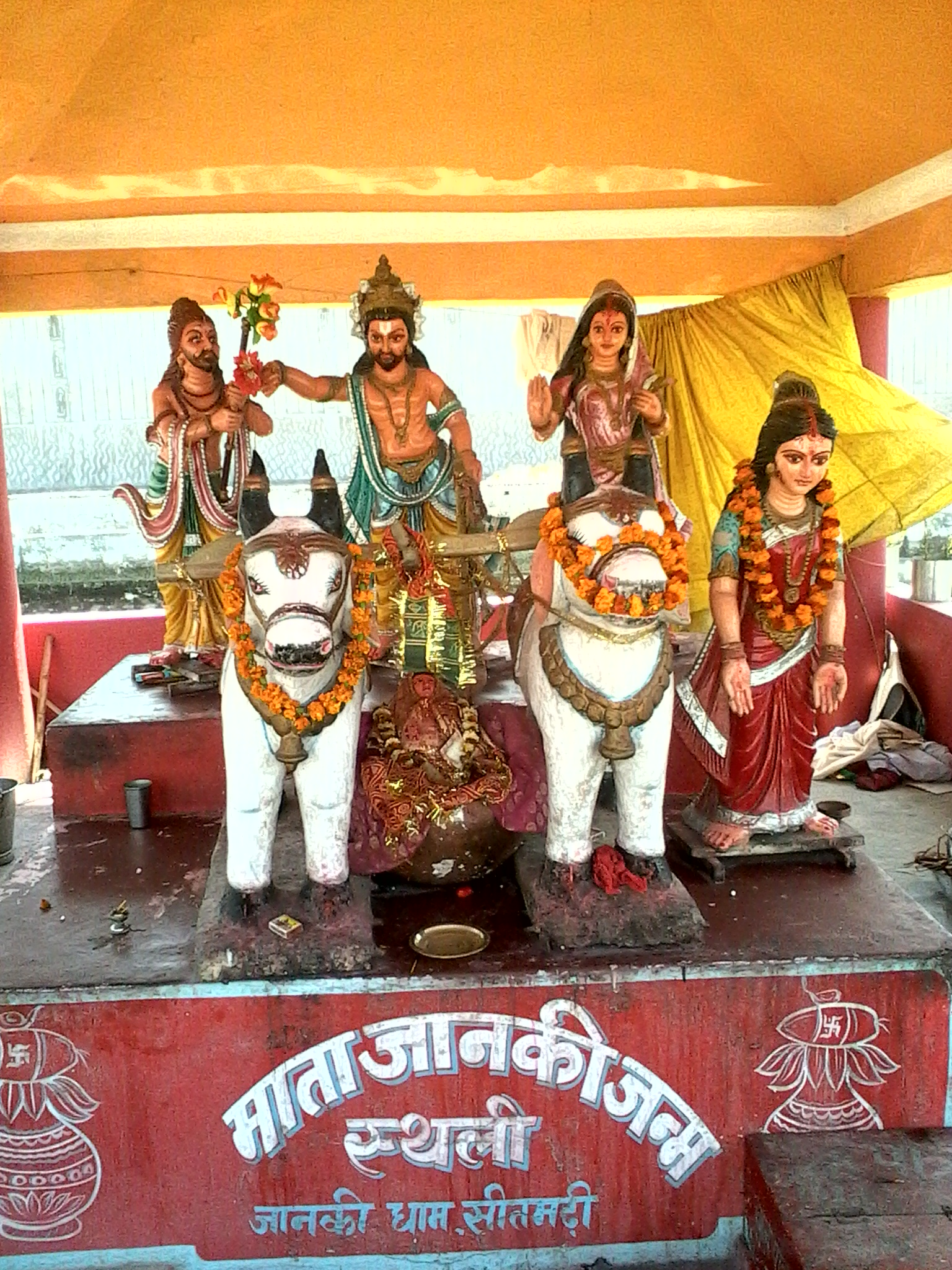
Statues at Urvija Kund
