= Sita Navami =

Hindu festival celebrating the birth of the deity Sita

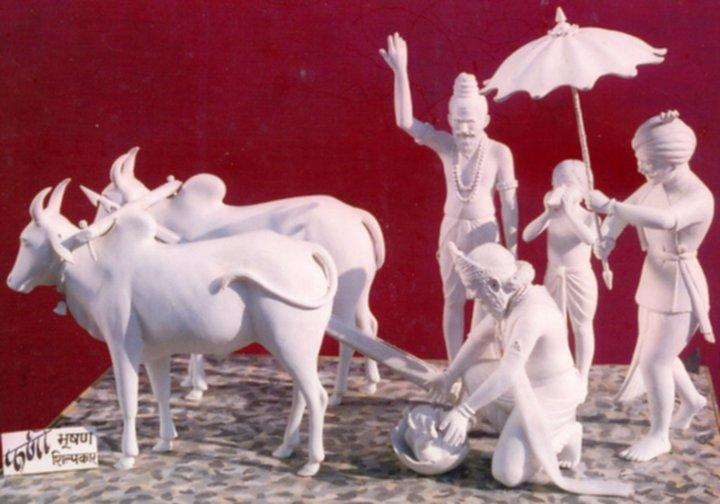
- Image depicting the manifestation of Sita from the Earth
- Also called: Janaki Navami, Sita Jayanti, Janaki Jayanti
- Type: Hindu
- Significance: marks the divine appearance of Goddess Sita,
- Observances: Puja, Vrata (fast), recitation of the Ramayana and other versions, Sita Puja
- Date: Sita Navami is celebrated every year on the ninth day of Shukla Paksha in the month of Vaisakha
- 2026 date: 25 April
- Duration: 1 Day
- Frequency: Annual

Sita Navami (also called Sita Jayanti, Sanskrit: सीतानवमी, romanized: Sītānavamī) is a Hindu festival that celebrates the birth of the goddess Sita. It is celebrated on the navami (ninth day) of the Shukla Paksha (first lunar fortnight) of the Hindu month of Vaishakha.

== Legend ==
According to the Ramayana, the infant Sita appeared or manifested from a divine earthen pot in the kingdom of Mithila from a farm field to King Siradhvaja Janaka and Queen Sunayana. According to regional tradition, this site is identified to be at the Punaura Dham of the Sitamarhi district of Bihar, India. The date and time of the manifestation of the infant Sita is recorded as the ninth day of Shukla Navami in the Vaishakha month of Ayilyam nakshatra in the Ramayana. It is said that when King Siradhvaja Janaka was ploughing the land with a plow, a part of his plough got stuck in the earth. On digging that place, he found an infant girl in an earthen pot. A tip of the plow is called Sita, and hence the girl was named Sita and was adopted as the king's daughter. Sita later married Rama, the seventh incarnation of Vishnu. Sita is revered for her loyalty, devotion and sacrifice to her husband. She is considered the epitome of womanhood and is regarded as the ideal wife and mother in the Indian subcontinent.

== Description ==
Sita Navami celebrates the anniversary date of the appearance or manifestation of Sita. On the occasion of Sita Navami, married women fast for their husbands's long life.

In the city of Sitamarhi, a grand religious one day internal circumambulation of the city known as Antar Griha Parikrama which is a part of the larger Sitamarhi Dham Parikrama is organised on the day of Janaki Navami. It starts from the sacred site Urvija Kund, believed to be the birthplace of Goddess Sita, at the Janaki Sthan and after the completion of the circumambulation it ends at the same Urvija Kund.
