= Harnandan Prasad =

Indian nobleman

Rai Bahadur Harnandan Prasad, was an Indian aristocrat, lawyer and civil servant. He was the ruler of Serkhouli estate and a member of the Imperial Civil Service.

In 1907, he was appointed to the post of member on the Sitamarhi Municipality Board. In 1910, he was appointed as Commissioner as well as Vice Chairman of the Sitamarhi Municipality. He was also appointed as an Honorary Magistrate of Sitamarhi in 1909.

He was also a pleader for the Maharaja of Darbhanga.
