= Shyam Sunder Das =

Indian politician (1932–1981)

Member of Parliament, Lok Sabha
- In office 1977–1979
- Preceded by: Nagendra Prasad Yadav
- Succeeded by: Bali Ram Bhagat
- Constituency: Sitamarhi, Bihar

Personal details
- Born: 29 September 1932 Janipur, Bihar, British India
- Died: 1981 (aged 48–49)
- Party: Janata Party
- Spouse: Prabha Benipuri

Mahanth Shyam Sunder Das (29 September 1932 – 1981) was an Indian politician. He was elected to the lower House of the Indian Parliament the Lok Sabha from Sitamarhi, Bihar as a member of the Janata Party.

Das died in 1981, at the age of 49.
