= Runni Saidpur =

Town in Bihar, India

- Town/ CD Block
- Location in Bihar, India
- Coordinates: 26.383°N 85.4833°E
- Country: India
- State: Bihar
- Region: Mithila
- District: Sitamarhi
- Elevation: 47 m (154 ft)

Languages
  - Official: Maithili, Hindi, Urdu
- Time zone: UTC+5:30 (IST)
- PIN: 843328
- Telephone code: 06226
- ISO 3166 code: IN-BR
- Vehicle registration: BR-30
- Lok Sabha constituency: Sitamarhi
- Vidhan Sabha constituency: Runnisaidpur

Runni Saidpur is a town and a block located in Sitamarhi district, Bihar, India. It is situated on the southern bank of the Lakhandei River. National Highway 77 passes through Runni Saidpur.

== Geography ==
The village is situated between the Lakhandei river in the north and the Bagmati river to the south. This area has been affected by floods several times, although the land is highly fertile. It forms part of the Indo-Gangetic Plain and is characterised by fertile alluvial soil. The wider region lies south of the Someshwar Range of the Himalayas and north of the Ganges plain. Summers are generally moderate, while winters can be cold. Runni Saidpur is located at 26.383°N 85.4833°E and has an average elevation of 47 metres (154 ft). The town is situated in the regional road network connecting Sitamarhi, Muzaffarpur and Mehsi. Mehsi, an important industrial and commercial town of East Champaran district, lies to the west of Runni Saidpur and forms an important regional centre for commerce and transport in the surrounding area.
