= Arjun Ray (MP) =

Indian politician

Member of Parliament
- In office 2009–2014
- Preceded by: Sitaram Yadav
- Succeeded by: Ram Kumar Sharma
- Constituency: Sitamarhi

Member of Bihar Legislative Assembly
- In office 2005–2009
- Preceded by: Ganesh Prasad Yadav
- Succeeded by: Surendra Kumar Yadav
- Constituency: Aurai

Personal details
- Born: 2 May 1972 (age 54) Sitamarhi, Bihar
- Party: Bharatiya Janata Party
- Other political affiliations: Janata Dal (United); Rashtriya Janata Dal
- Profession: Politician social worker

Arjun Ray (born 2 May 1972) alias Arjun Rai is an Indian politician from the Rashtriya Janata Dal, and a former Member of Parliament representing Sitamarhi(Lok Sabha constituency) in Bihar, India and former Member of the Bihar Legislative Assembly from Aurai Assembly Constituency. He served as a member of 14th Lok Sabha of India
