= Mithilesh Kumar =

Indian politician (born June 1974)

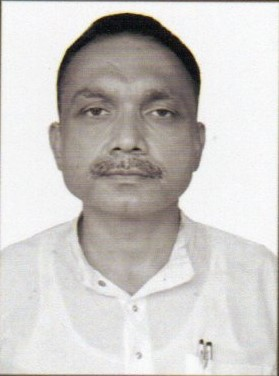

Member of Bihar Legislative Assembly
- Preceded by: Sunil Kushwaha
- Constituency: Sitamarhi

Personal details
- Born: 6 June 1974 (age 51)
- Party: Bhartiya Janata Party
- Occupation: Politician

Mithilesh Kumar (born 6 June 1974) is an Indian politician and former legislative member of Bihar.

== Professional career ==
He is a member of Bharatiya Janata Party and a Member of the Bihar Legislative Assembly from Sitamarhi Assembly constituency.
