= Sitamarhi Assembly constituency =

Coordinates: 26°36′N 85°29′E

Sitamarhi
- Constituency No. 28 for the Bihar Legislative Assembly

Constituency details
- Country: India
- Region: East India
- State: Bihar
- District: Sitamarhi
- Established: 1951
- Total electors: 305,766

Member of Legislative Assembly
- 18th Bihar Legislative Assembly
- Incumbent Sunil Kumar Pintu
- Party: BJP
- Alliance: NDA
- Elected year: 2025

Sitamarhi Assembly constituency is an assembly constituency in Sitamarhi district in the Indian state of Bihar. In 2015 Bihar Legislative Assembly election, Sitamarhi will be one of the 36 seats to have VVPAT enabled electronic voting machines.

== History ==
In 1995 constituency was won by Hari Shankar Prasad. His son Sunil Kumar Pintu represented this constituency three times later.

== Overview ==
As per Delimitation of Parliamentary and Assembly constituencies Order, 2008, 28. Sitamarhi Assembly constituency is composed of the following: Dumra community development block.

Sitamarhi Assembly constituency is part of 5. Sitamarhi (Lok Sabha constituency).

== Members of the Legislative Assembly ==
Year	Name	Party
1952	Damodar Jha	Socialist Party
1967	K. Shahi	Indian National Congress
1969	Shyam Sunder Das	Samyukta Socialist Party
1972	Ram Swarup Singh	Communist Party of India
1977	Ram Sagar Prasad Yadav	Indian National Congress
1980	Pir Mohammad Ansari	Indian National Congress (I)
1985	Khalil Ansari	Indian National Congress
1990	Shahid Ali Khan	Janata Dal
1995	Hari Shankar Prasad	Bharatiya Janata Party
2000	Shahid Ali Khan	Rashtriya Janata Dal
2005	Sunil Kumar Pintu	Bharatiya Janata Party
2005	Sunil Kumar Pintu	Bharatiya Janata Party
2010	Sunil Kumar Pintu	Bharatiya Janata Party
2015	Sunil Kushwaha	Rashtriya Janata Dal
2020	Mithilesh Kumar	Bharatiya Janata Party
2025	Sunil Kumar Pintu	Bharatiya Janata Party

== Election results ==
=== 2025 ===
2025 Bihar Legislative Assembly election: Sitamarhi
Party	Candidate	Votes	%	±%
BJP	Sunil Kumar Pintu	104,226	48.11	−1.79
RJD	Sunil Kumar Kushwaha	98,664	45.54	+1.99
Independent	Ram Kishore Ray	2,867	1.32	
Rashtriya Jansambhavna Party	Upendra Sahani	2,419	1.12	
NOTA	None of the above	2,284	1.05	−0.6
Majority		5,562	2.57	−3.78
Turnout		216,653	70.86	+9.0
BJP hold		Swing	NDA	

=== 2020 ===
2020 Bihar Legislative Assembly election: Sitamarhi
Party	Candidate	Votes	%	±%
BJP	Mithilesh Kumar	90,236	49.9	+9.24
RJD	Sunil Kumar	78,761	43.55	−6.07
BSP	Rakesh Kumar Tunna	2,035	1.13	+0.55
NOTA	None of the above	2,979	1.65	+0.66
Majority		11,475	6.35	−2.61
Turnout		180,842	61.86	−1.51
BJP gain from RJD		Swing		

=== 2015 ===
2015 Bihar Legislative Assembly election: Sitamarhi
Party	Candidate	Votes	%	±%
RJD	Sunil Kumar	81,557	49.62	
BJP	Sunil Kumar Alias Pintu	66,835	40.66	
Independent	Nagina Devi	3,624	2.2	
Rashtriya Janshanti Party	Anup Mahto	2,236	1.36	
Independent	Rakesh Kumar Tunna	2,059	1.25	
NOTA	None of the above	1,629	0.99	
Majority		14,722	8.96	
Turnout		164,358	63.37	
