= Mangita Devi =

Indian politician

Mangita Devi Yadav (born 6 April 1981) is an Indian politician. She was member of the Bihar legislative assembly 2015-2020 representing Runnisaidpur Vidhan Sabha constituency in Sitamarhi district.
