= Theodore Bodra =

Indian politician (born 1917)

Member of Parliament, Rajya Sabha
- In office 1954–1960
- Constituency: Bihar

Personal details
- Born: 1 January 1917
- Party: Jharkhand Party

Theodore Bodra (born 1 January 1917, date of death unknown) was an Indian politician. He was a Member of Parliament, representing Bihar in the Rajya Sabha the upper house of India's Parliament as a member of the Jharkhand Party. Bodra is deceased.
