= Anil Kumar (born 1987) =

Indian politician

Member of the Bihar Legislative Assembly
- In office 2020–2025
- Constituency: Bathnaha Assembly constituency

Personal details
- Born: 1987 (age 38–39) Sursand, Sitamarhi district, Bihar, India
- Party: Bharatiya Janata Party
- Parent: Yamuna Ram (father)
- Education: Civil Engineering (2013)
- Occupation: Politician

Anil Kumar (born 1987) is an Indian politician from Bihar. He is an MLA from Bathnaha Assembly constituency which is reserved for Scheduled Caste community in Sitamarhi district. He won the 2020 Bihar Legislative Assembly election representing the Bharatiya Janata Party.

== Early life and education ==
Kumar is from Sursand, Sitamarhi district, Bihar. He is the son of Yamuna Ram. He completed his Civil Engineering in 2013 at Birla Institute of Technology, Mesra, Ranchi.

== Career ==
Kumar won from Bathnaha Assembly constituency representing Bharatiya Janata Party in the 2020 Bihar Legislative Assembly election. He polled 92,648 votes and defeated his nearest rival, Sanjay Ram of Indian National Congress, by a margin of 46,818 votes.
