= Nagendra Raut =

Indian politician

Member of the Bihar Legislative Assembly
- Incumbent
- Assumed office 14 November 2025
- Preceded by: Dilip Kumar Ray
- Constituency: Sursand

Personal details
- Born: 15 November 1960 (age 65) Sursand
- Party: Janata Dal (United)
- Education: Bihar University, Muzaffarpur
- Profession: Politician, Professor

Nagendra Raut is an Indian politician from Bihar. He was elected as a Member of Legislative Assembly in 2025 Bihar Legislative Assembly election, representing the Sursand constituency. He is a member of the Janata Dal (United).
