= Jainandan Prasad Yadav =

Indian politician

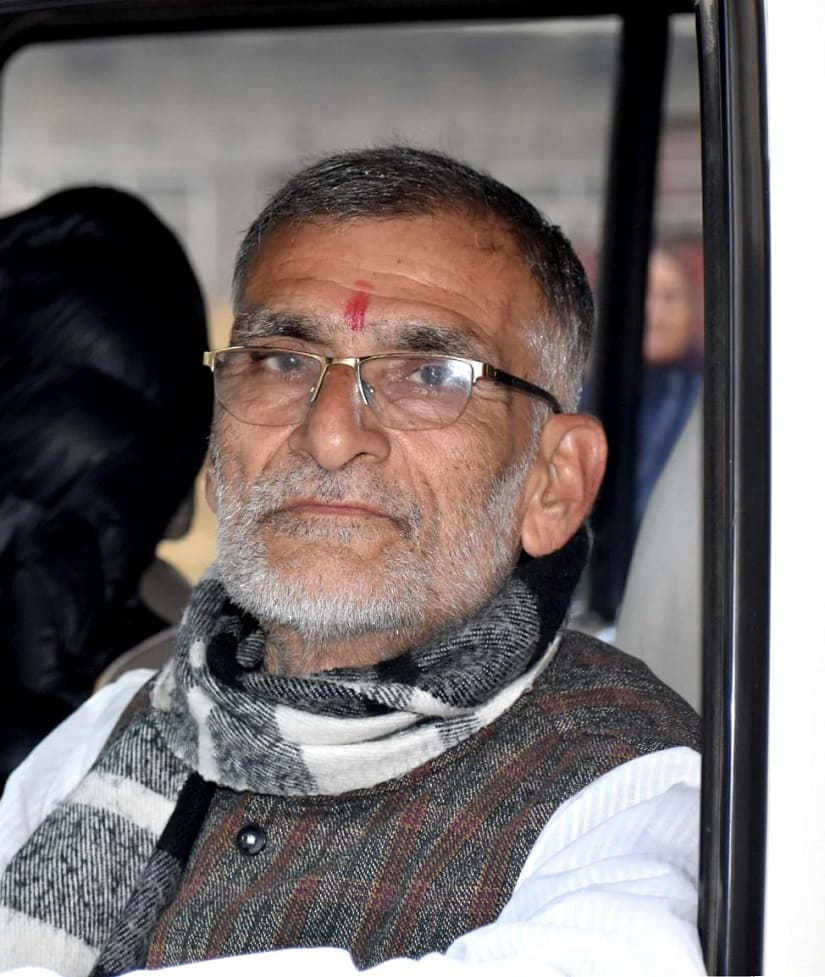

Member of the Bihar Legislative Assembly
- In office 2000 – February 2005
- Preceded by: Nagendra Prasad Yadav
- Constituency: Sursand, Sitamarhi, Bihar
- In office February 2005 – October 2005
- Constituency: Sursand, Sitamarhi, Bihar
- In office October 2005 – 2010
- Succeeded by: Shahid Ali Khan

Personal details
- Born: Sardalpatti, Sitamarhi, Bihar
- Party: Rashtriya Janata Dal (RJD)
- Other political affiliations: Janata Dal (United) (JDU)
- Children: Vikash Kumar, Avinash Kumar, Nishu Kumari and Neelu Kumari.
- Parent: Ramcharitra Rai Yadav (father)
- Relatives: Brothers: Dr Chandeshwar Pd. Yadav and Suresh Kumar; Nephews: Prabhat Kumar, Prakash Kumar, Nishant Kumar, Chandan Kumar, Jyoti Kumari and Prince Kumar
- Occupation: Politician social worker

Jainandan Prasad Yadav is an Indian politician and social worker. He served as a member of the Bihar Legislative Assembly, representing the Sursand constituency in Sitamarhi district, Bihar. He held this position from 2000 to 2010. He is the son of late Veteran Socialist leader, Former Member of Bihar Legislative Assembly and Freedom Fighter, Ramcharitrarai Yadav.

== Political and personal life ==
Yadav was elected in 2000 after his father's demise on the Janata Dal (United) ticket and later on twice on the ticket of Rashtriya Janata Dal (RJD) from the Sursand constituency, Sitamarhi, Bihar.

== See also ==
- February 2005 Bihar Legislative Assembly election
- October 2005 Bihar Legislative Assembly election
