= Madhesra =

Madhesara
- village
- Country: India
- State: Bihar
- District: Sitamarhi

Languages
  - Official: Maithili, Hindi
- Time zone: UTC+5:30 (IST)
- ISO 3166 code: IN-BR
- Vehicle registration: BR-
- Coastline: 0 kilometres (0 mi)
- Nearest city: Sitamarhi
- vidhan Sabha constituency: Bathnaha

Madhesara is a village in the Sitamarhi district of Bihar state, India.

This village is known for its traditional values and ponds. This village is situated at around 2.5 km from NH-77.

There is an old Shiva temple in the nearby village named Madhiya.

Chhapkahiya is a site in the village which said to have been created by a ghost and which belongs to "Madhesara Darbar".
