= Ram Charitra Rai Yadav =

Indian politician

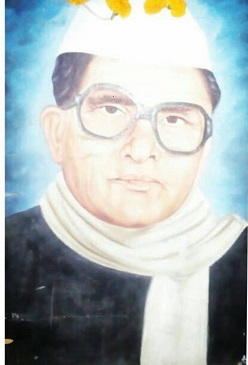

Member of the Bihar Legislative Assembly
- In office 1952–1957
- Preceded by: Position Established
- Succeeded by: Maheshwar Prasad Narain Sinha
- Constituency: Sursand, Sitamarhi, Bihar
- In office 1969–1972
- Preceded by: Pratibha Devi
- Constituency: Sursand, Sitamarhi, Bihar
- In office 1972–1977
- Constituency: Sursand, Sitamarhi, Bihar
- In office 1977–1980
- Succeeded by: Nagendra Prasad Yadav
- Constituency: Sursand, Sitamarhi, Bihar

Personal details
- Born: Sardalpatti, Sitamarhi, Bihar
- Died: 11 August 1998 Sitamarhi, Bihar
- Party: Indian National Congress
- Other political affiliations: Independent politician Praja Socialist Party; Swatantra Party; Indian National Congress (U)
- Children: Dr. Chandeshwar Prasad Yadav, Former MLA Dr. Jainandan Prasad Yadav and Suresh Kumar
- Relatives: Grandchildrens : Prabhat Kumar, Prakash Kumar, Nishant Kumar, Nishu Kumari, Vikash Kumar, Chandan Kumar, Neelu Kumari, Jyoti Kumari, Avinash Kumar, Prince Kumar
- Occupation: Politician social worker activist

Ram Charitra Rai Yadav, alias Ram Chalitra Yadav was an Indian politician, freedom fighter, and social worker, known as the Gandhi of Sitamarhi. He was a member of the Bihar Legislative Assembly, representing the Sursand in Sitamarhi district, Bihar. He was the first MLA from the Sursand Assembly constituency. He served this position from 1952 to 1957 as an independent, after India's first general election (1951–52), and again from 1969 to 1980.

He was a veteran socialist leader and one of the prominent figures in Bihar politics during his era. On August 11, 1998, he became a martyr during a firing incident at the Sitamarhi Collectorate while protesting for the rights of the poor and demanding adequate relief for flood-affected people in Sitamarhi and other parts of North Bihar.

After his martyrdom, the politics of Bihar became very heated. According to the book Saptkranti's Samvad Jannayak Karpoori Thakur Smriti Granth, It is mentioned that "It is written in the dictionary, India that is Bharat. A handful of people in the country live in India, and the masses live in Bharat. He spoke on this in detail and said a very deep thing that our country has become independent, but we have not gained real freedom because the country is facing economic, social, and political problems. Social and cultural freedom has not been achieved. I fully realized this deep thing when, in 1998, there was police firing on the meeting being held after the demonstration at Sitamarhi Collectorate gate, in which former MLA Ram Charitra Rai, along with Dr. Ayub, Mahant Mandal, were present. Rampari Devi and Munif Nadaf died".

Several prominent leaders, including the then Railway Minister Nitish Kumar and Sharad Yadav, and other notable leaders from Bihar and across India, condemned the incident and expressed their condolences. They also visited his house for his funeral.

== Political and personal life ==
Yadav was elected in 1952 as an independent and thrice ticket of Indian National Congress from Sursand constituency.

A statue has been made at Radhaur More, NH104, Sursand, Sitamarhi, Bihar, in memory of him and his struggle.

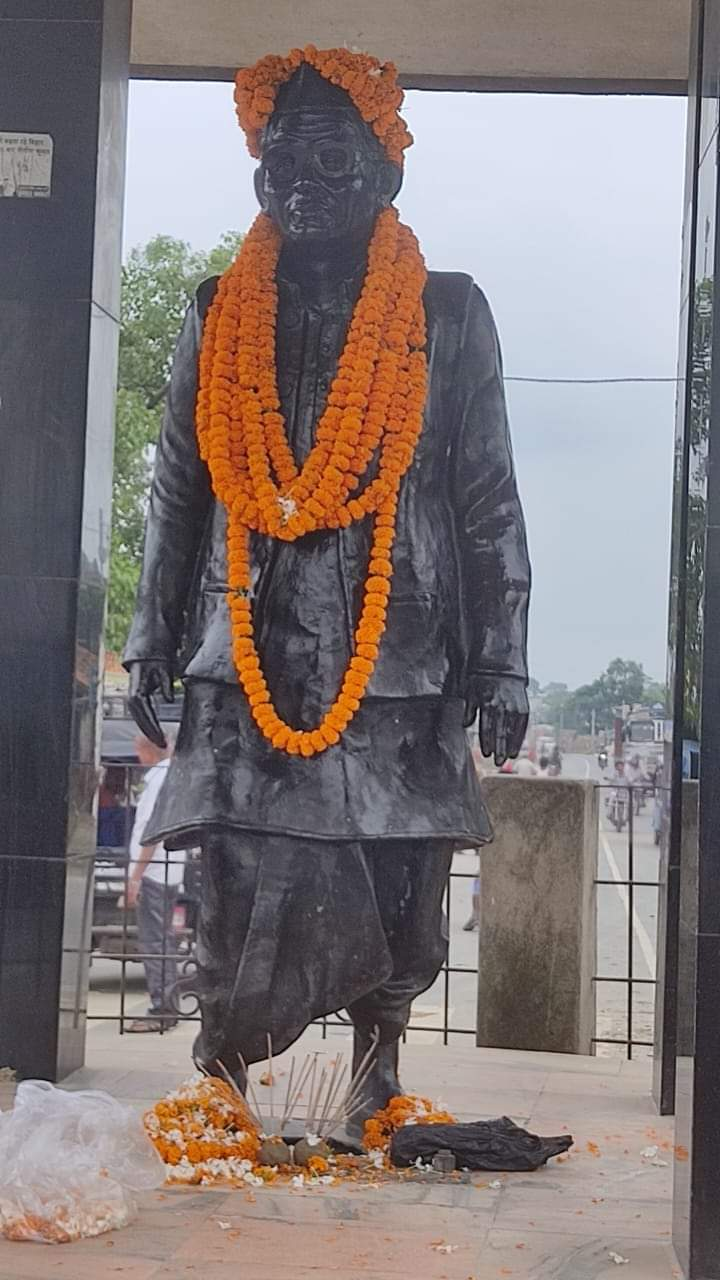
Ex mla sursand freedom fighter ram charitra rai yadav

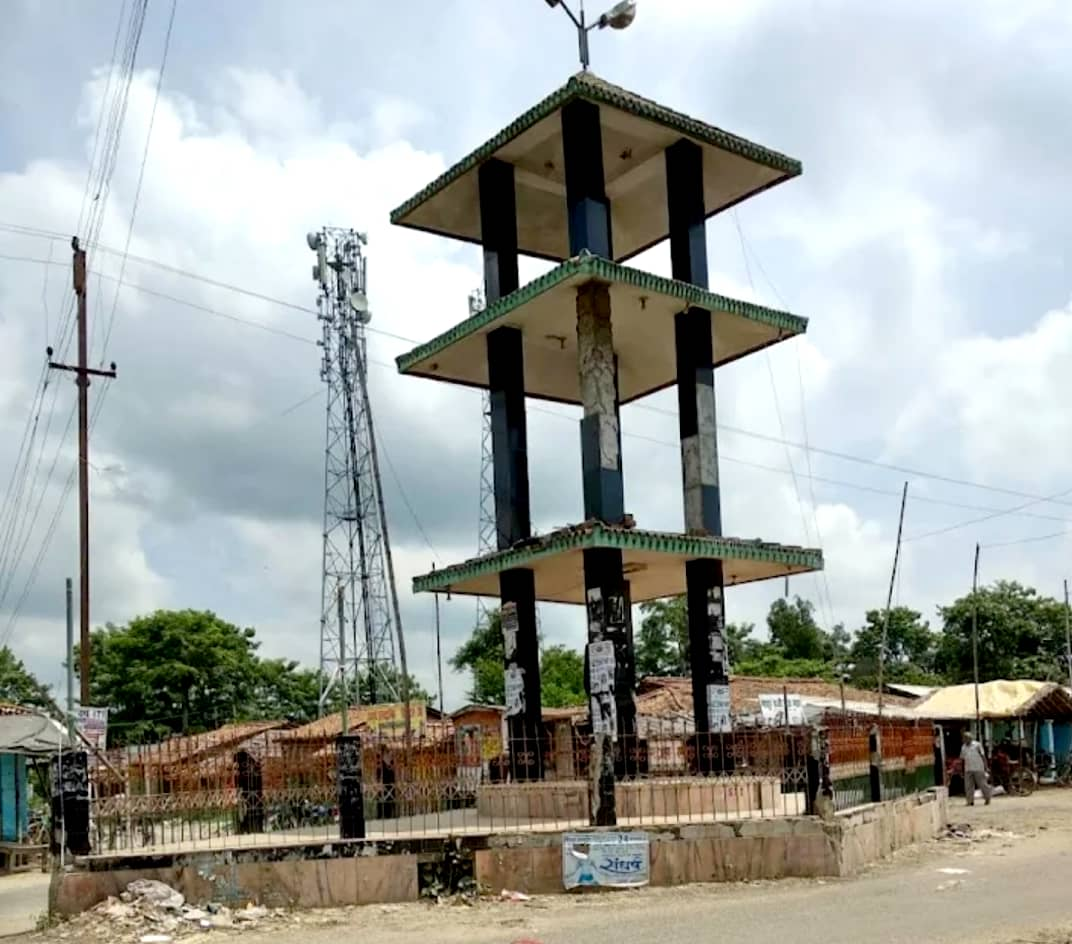
Sursand ex mla Ram charitra rai yadav statue
