= Guddi Devi =

Indian politician

- Born: Sitamarhi
- Occupation: Politician
- Political party: Bharatiya Janta Party(BJP)
- Spouse: Rajesh Choudhary
- Children: 1

Guddi Devi also known as Guddi Choudhary is an Indian politician. She was first elected as a member of the Bihar Legislative Assembly in 2005, representing the Runnisaidpur constituency as a member of the Janta Dal (United) party (JD(U)). In 2005, the JD(U) formed an alliance with the Bharatiya Janta Party (BJP) and the National Democratic Alliance (NDA) to form a government in Bihar. In 2010, she was re-elected for a second term. On 20 September 2015, Devi resigned from the JD(U) after completing two terms and joined the Samajwadi party to contest the 2015 Assembly election. In 2020, she joined the Lok Jan Shakti Party (LJP) and represented them in the Runnisaidpur constituency election. On 10 October 2022, she joined Bharatiya Janta Party (BJP) along with her massive supporters.
