= Ram Kumar Sharma =

Indian politician (born 1964)

Kushwaha Ram Kumar Sharma
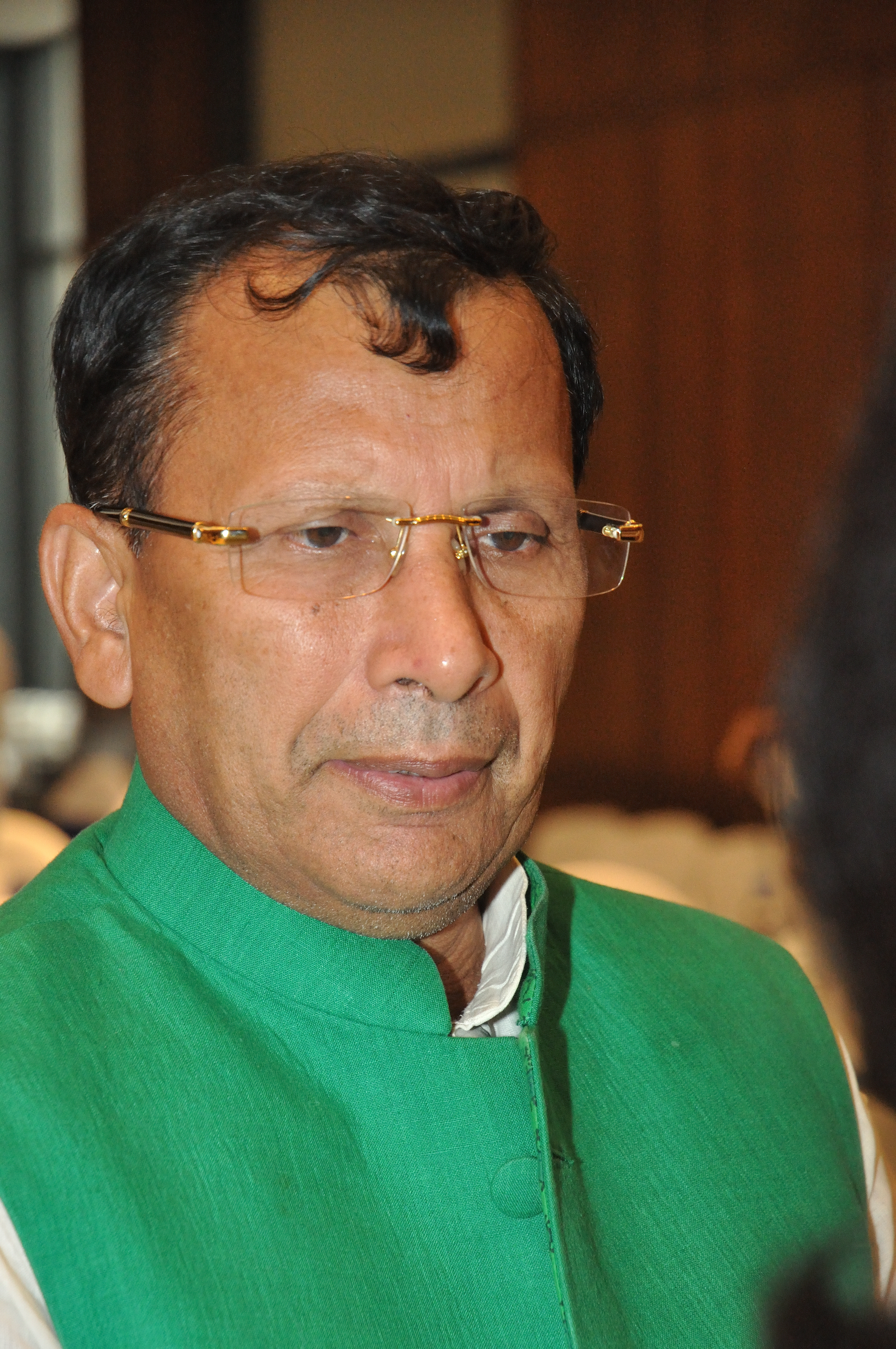

Member of the India Parliament for Sitamarhi
- In office 16 May 2014 – 23 May 2019
- Preceded by: Arjun Roy
- Constituency: Sitamarhi

National General Secretary of Janata Dal (United)
- Incumbent
- Assumed office March 2023

Personal details
- Born: 8 January 1964 (age 62) Vill. Nanpur, Sitamarhi, Bihar
- Party: Janata Dal (United)
- Spouse: Vina Bharti
- Children: Anmol kushwaha/ Ashwary kumar
- As of 12 December, 2016

Kushwaha Ram Kumar Sharma (born 1964) is an Indian politician and a member of parliament from Sitamarhi (Lok Sabha constituency), Bihar. He won the 2014 Indian general election being a Rashtriya Lok Samta Party candidate.

== Political career ==
Sharma was a Member of Indian Parliament from Sitamarhi constituency. He was a member of Rashtriya Lok Samata Party, a splinter political party that emerged from Janata Dal (United). He was considered as a trusted aide of Upendra Kushwaha, and was serving as the Chief Whip of RLSP in Lok Sabha. He was also the parliamentary board president of the party. In 2019, RLSP under Upendra Kushwaha aligned with Mahagathbandhan (Bihar). Sharma accused Upendra Kushwaha of selling party tickets without consulting him and avoiding the political workers. He caused a split in the RLSP by floating his own faction called Rashtriya Lok Samata Party (Ramkumar Sharma).
