= Shashthi (day) =

Sixth day of the lunar fortnight in the Hindu calendar

Shashthi (Sanskrit: षष्ठी, romanized: Ṣaṣṭhī) also referred to as Chhath is the sixth day of the lunar fortnight in the Hindu calendar. It is tithi (lunar day) of a paksha, the fourteen-day phase of the moon.

== Etymology ==
The word comes from the Sanskrit cardinal ṣaṣ (six), whence the ordinal number (linguistics) ṣaṣṭha (sixth), fem. ṣaṣṭhī (days of the paksha are feminine gender).

== Occasions ==
The sixth tithi, especially in the waxing period (shuklapaksha), is important in several rituals including:

- Durga Puja (September–October, east India, Bengal)
- Sitalsasthi (May–June, Orissa, neighbouring regions)
- Skanda (Kandha) Shashti or Subramanya Shashti (November–December, south India, Tamil Nadu)
- Chandra Shashti (Channan Chhath): It is celebrated on Krishna Paksha Shahsti of Bhadrapada month. It is quite popular among Dogra community of Jammu division. The day is celebrated as birthday of Balarama and hence also called Balram Chhath or Baldev Chhath.
- Surya Shashti (Chhath), a major sun-worshiping day of Hindus is celebrated on sixth day Shukla Paksha of Kartika.
