= Tarakant Jha =

Chairperson of the Bihar Legislative Council

Tarakant Jha (1927–2014) was chairperson of the Bihar Legislative Council. He was a leader of Bharatiya Jan Sangh and later of Bharatiya Janata Party. In early 2014 he joined Janata Dal (United) party. Jha was a senior lawyer. He died in May 2014. He was a central figure in the Ram Rath Yatra held in 1990.
