= Shahid Ali Khan (singer) =

Singer

Shahid Ali Khan (Urdu: شاہد علی خان) is a Canada based singer in the Qawwali genre, a musical tradition that dates back over 700 years.

== Biography ==
Shahid Ali Khan was born in Lahore, Pakistan, and brought up in a family of Qawwal musicians. He studied under [Nusrat Fateh Ali Khan], and later performed with him. He started his singing with his uncle Mohammad Butta and Bashir Ahmed Qadri the famous qawals of Pakistan.

== Recordings ==
Shahid Ali Khan released his first CD in Canada in November 2006. The self-titled album is in the Qawwali music style.

== See also ==
- Music of Pakistan
- List of Pakistani musicians
- Qawwali
- Nusrat Fateh Ali Khan
