= Rashtriya Lok Samta Party =

Political party in India

Rashtriya Lok Samata Party
- Abbreviation: RLSP
- President: Upendra Kushwaha
- Founder: Upendra Kushwaha
- Founded: 3 March 2013 (13 years ago)
- Dissolved: 14 March 2021 (5 years ago)
- Split from: Janata Dal (United)
- Preceded by: Samata Party
- Merged into: Janata Dal (United)
- Succeeded by: Rashtriya Lok Morcha
- ECI status: State Party
- Alliance: National Democratic Alliance (2014—2018); United Progressive Alliance (2018—2020); Grand Democratic Secular Front (2020—2021)

Election symbol

Website
- ralospa.in

Rashtriya Lok Samta Party (abbreviated as RLSP; translation: National People's Equity Party) was a political party in India led by Upendra Kushwaha. It was launched on 3 March 2013 and based in the state of Bihar. The party came into existence as a result of a feud between Nitish Kumar and Upendra Kushwaha, after which Kushwaha left the Nitish Kumar-led Janata Dal (United) and formed his own party. It has faced multiple rebellions and desertions since 2015. After relations between Nitish and Kushwaha normalized, Upendra Kushwaha merged RLSP into JDU on 14 March 2021, with this, the party ceased to exist.

== History of the party ==
=== Background ===
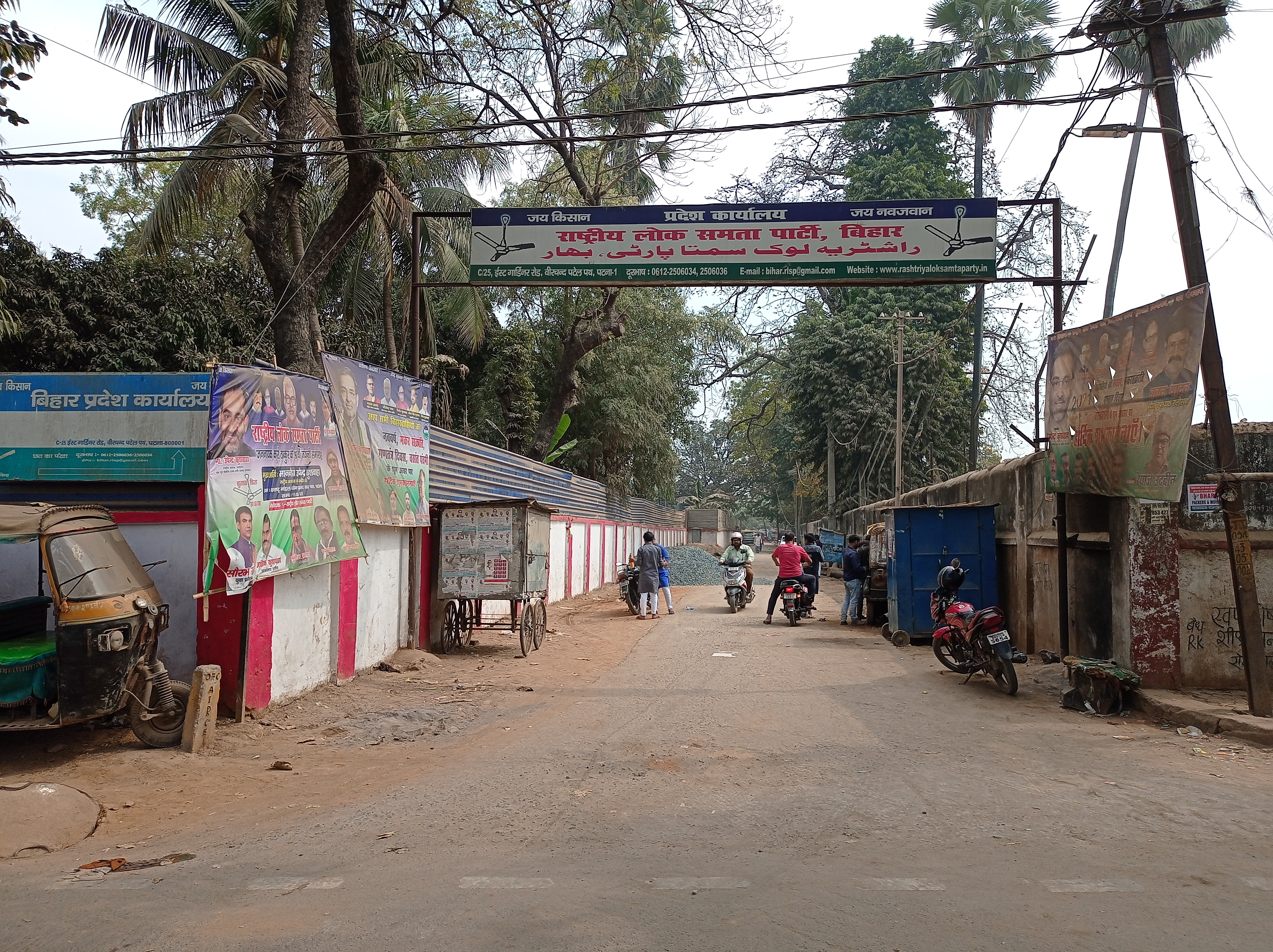
Bihar state headquarter of Rashtriya Lok Samata Party.

Upendra Kushwaha was dismissed from the Janata Dal (United) in 2007. Kushwaha founded the Rashtriya Samata Party in February 2009. The party was formed in the backdrop of alleged marginalisation of the Koeri caste and autocratic rule by the Nitish Kumar government in Bihar. The formation of the party was supported by Chhagan Bhujbal, the deputy chief minister of Maharashtra. In November 2009, the party was merged into the Janata Dal (United) with the mending of ties between Kushwaha and Kumar.

On 4 January 2013, Upendra Kushwaha who at the time was a Rajya Sabha member resigned from the Janata Dal (United). He alleged that the Nitish model had failed and that the law and order situation was becoming as bad as it had been 7 years ago. He further alleged that the Nitish Kumar runs his government through autocratic means and that he had turned the Janata Dal (United) into his "pocket organisation".

=== Formation and early years ===
Kushwaha launched the Rashtriya Lok Samata Party in a rally in Gandhi Maidan, Patna on 3 March 2013. The party's base was reported to be primarily among the member of Koeri or Kushwaha caste, which is recognised as a dominant Backward Caste in state of Bihar. (Note: Upendra Kushwaha's RLSP has its base among the Kushwahas or Koeris, a dominant other backward caste (OBC) that forms 8 per cent of the electorate. The party won three seats, with the Modi wave behind it, in 2014. The challenge for Kushwaha is to wean away the Koeris, Kurmis and the EBC Dhanuks from Nitish (who is a Kurmi). This is also why the BJP did not try to stop Kushwaha when he quit the NDA.) At the time of formation, Kushwaha had stated that the party will attempt to overthrow the National Democratic Alliance in the state of Bihar. However, following the departure of the Janata Dal (United) from the alliance, the party joined the National Democratic Alliance. In the subsequent 2014 Indian general election, it contested 3 parliamentary seats in Bihar (Sitamarhi, Karakat and Jahanabad) as part of the alliance and won all of them. Upendra Kushwaha was elected from the Karakat constituency and was appointed as the Minister of State of Human Resource Development. In the following 2015 Bihar Legislative Assembly election, the party contested 23 out of 243 seats as part of the alliance but was able to have its representative elected from only two seats.

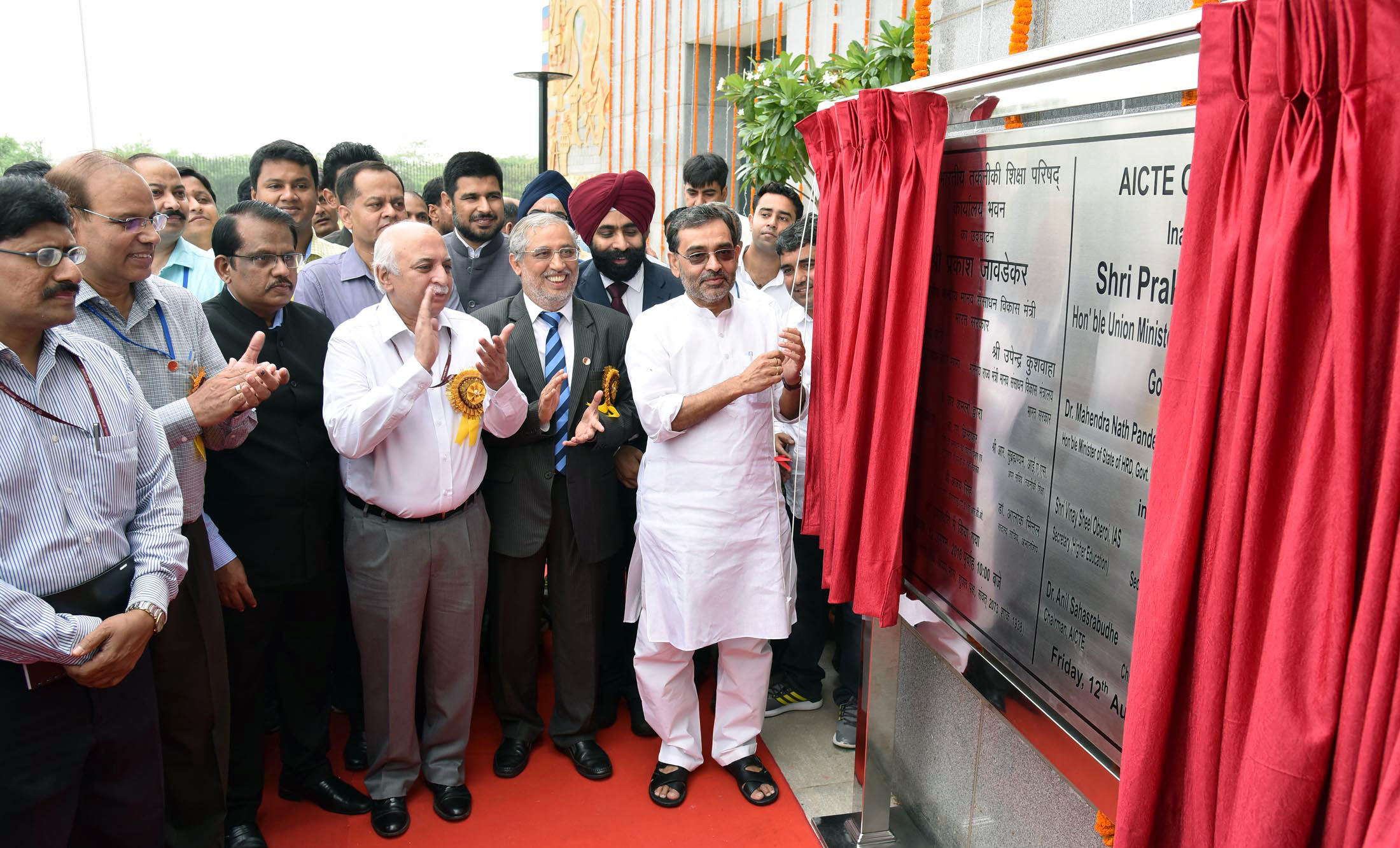
Upendra Kushwaha unveiling the plaque to inaugurate the newly constructed office complex of All India Council for Technical Education (AICTE), a statutory body of Govt. of India, Ministry of HRD, in New Delhi.

=== Factionalism and desertions ===
From late 2015 onward, the party was divided into two factions; one led by Upendra Kushwaha and the other led by Arun Kumar, the member of parliament from the Jahanabad constituency. In 2016, the faction of Arun Kumar held a meeting which announced the replacement of Kushwaha with Arun Kumar as the leader of the party. Lalan Paswan, a member of the Bihar Legislative Assembly from the party had also attended the meeting. Kumar claimed that his faction was the real representatives of the party and decided to move to the Election Commission of India staking claim to the party name and symbol while further accusing Kushwaha of adopting autocratic means of running the party. In retaliation, the Kushwaha faction constituting the disciplinary committee of the party recommended the suspension of both Arun Kumar and Lalan Paswan for "indiscipline and anti-party activities". The disciplinary committee was headed by Ram Kumar Sharma, the other member of parliament from the party.

In June 2018, the party formally split with the faction of Arun Kumar forming the Rashtriya Samata Party (Secular). In the same year, the Rashtriya Lok Samata Party left the National Democratic Alliance. The party had been involved in an argument with the alliance over seat sharing arrangement for the upcoming general election while targeting the Janata Dal (United) which had rejoined the alliance. This led to rebellion from all the three state legislators of the party, who declared that they represented the real party, raising objections that they intended to remain in the alliance. The legislators were at the time attempting to get Sudhanshu Shekhar included in the Council of Ministers of Bihar which was led by Nitish Kumar. Shekhar was one of the legislators of the state party in Bihar. However on 20 December 2018, Upendra Kushwaha declared that the party had joined the opposition United Progressive Alliance. Earlier in 2017, the Nagmani led Samras Samaj Party had been merged into the Rashtriya Lok Samata Party. Nagmani was subsequently made the national executive of the party. In February 2019, he was sacked from the post for alleged "anti-party" activities following which he resigned from the party on grounds that Upendra Kushwaha was allegedly selling party tickets for the upcoming election.

In the 2019 Indian general election, the Rashtriya Lok Samata Party contested on 5 parliamentary seats as part of the United Progressive Alliance with Upendra Kushwaha contesting from two seats. The party was however unable to win on a single seat while the alliance won just one seat in Bihar. Following the election, all the three formerly dissident state legislators of the party joined the Janata Dal (United).

== 2020 Bihar Assembly Elections ==
=== Exit from mainstream coalitions ===
In the wake of the 2020 Bihar Legislative Assembly election, Upendra Kushwaha pulled the party out of the Rashtriya Janata Dal led Mahagathbandhan (Grand Alliance), the extension of the United Progressive Alliance in Bihar. The party entered into an alliance with the Uttar Pradesh based Bahujan Samaj Party and the minor Janatantrik Party (Socialist); according to Kushwaha both the major alliances were no different from each other. According to the Dainik Bhaskar, the unorthodox alliance was symptomatic of a pattern of shrinking space for smaller parties leaving them with less leverage in seat sharing negotiations within larger alliances. Following the new arrangement, the state president of the party, Bhudeo Choudhary resigned from his position and joined the Rashtriya Janata Dal. This was followed by the national general secretary Madhav Anand resigning from his party membership while stating that the decision for an alliance with minor players was "inconsequential" and could potentially finish the party. Subsequently, the new state president of the party, Bharat Bind resigned to join the Rashtriya Janata Dal as well.

During the campaign stage, the new coalition was merged with another smaller one consisting of the Telangana based All India Majlis-e-Ittehadul Muslimeen and the Devendra Prasad Yadav led Samajwadi Janata Dal Democratic to form the Grand Democratic Secular Alliance, this alliance also included the Suheldev Bharatiya Samaj Party and declared Upendra Kushwaha as the candidate for the position of Chief Minister of Bihar. In the meantime, the former member of the legislative assembly Ajay Pratap joined the party.

=== fielding of candidates ===
Relying upon its vote base which is Kushwaha caste, RLSP fielded 40% Kushwaha candidates in the elections . The Grand Democratic Secular Front of which RLSP was a constituent member relied primarily upon the votes of castes like Kushwahas, Ravidasis, and Muslims . RLSP in the first phase of elections contested a total of 42 seats amongst which it gave ticket to 17 candidates of Kushwaha caste while its ally AIMIM placed its candidates in Muslim dominated areas of Bihar. Similarly in the list of its 37 candidates in the second phase also Koeri candidates were dominant accounting for 18 seats.

=== Result ===
RLSP failed to grab any seat but its allies AIMIM and BSP ended up getting 6 seat overall. The percentage of vote earned by AIMIM was smaller as compared to the RLSP but unlike the former it emerged stronger in the Simanchal region of Bihar. It also showed its strong presence on many seats including Dinara and Saffron.

== Merger into JD(U) ==
Following the poor performance of the party in 2020 Bihar assembly elections, the speculation of Upendra Kushwaha's merger with JD(U) rose again. This speculation, however was not clear until March 2021, which led many party leaders including acting state president of RLSP, Veerendra Kushwaha joining hands with the Rashtriya Janata Dal. The party finally merged into JDU, from which it was formed as a result of split in 2013 and Kushwaha was made the president of parliamentary board of the JD(U). The merger and the heartwarming welcome to Upendra Kushwaha was seen as the attempt to revive JD(U)'s old social coalition of Kurmi-Koeri castes, which was utilised by Nitish Kumar to oust the Rashtriya Janata Dal from power after the 1990s.

== Electoral performance ==
=== Lok Sabha ===
Year	Seats		±	Voteshare (%)	± (%)	Coalition	Outcome
Year	Won	Contested	±	Voteshare (%)	± (%)	Coalition	Outcome
2014	3 / 40	3	New	3.05%	New	NDA	Government
2019	0 / 40	5	▼3	3.66%	▲0.61%	UPA	Opposition

=== Vidhan Sabha ===
Year	Seats		±	Voteshare (%)	± (%)	Coalition	Outcome
Year	Won	Contested	±	Voteshare (%)	± (%)	Coalition	Outcome
2015	2 / 243	23	New	2.56%	New	NDA	Opposition
2020	0 / 243	99	▼2	1.77%	▼0.79%	GDSF	Opposition

== See also ==
- Samata Party
- List of political parties in India
