= Bagahi Dham =

Hindu shrine in Mithila, Bihar, India

- बगही धाम
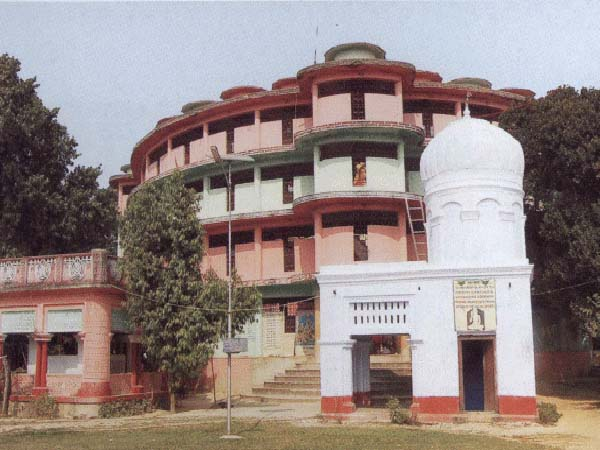
- View of Bagahi Dham in Sitamarhi

Religion
- Affiliation: Hinduism
- District: Sitamarhi district
- Deity: Lord Shiva

Location
- Location: Riga, Bagahi village, near Ranjitpur village
- State: Bihar
- Country: India
- Interactive map of Bagahi Dham
- Coordinates: 26.6505161°N 85.4560097°E

Architecture
- Architect: Baba Dhaneshwar Nath Mahadev Mandir
- Founder: Baba Tapasvi Narayan Das
- First Shiva Panchayatan Mandir in North Bihar

Bagahi Dham (Maithili: बगही धाम) is a Hindu shrine in the Mithila region of Bihar in India. It is also known as Bagahi Matha. It is located at Bagahi village near Ranjitpur village in the Sitamarhi district. It was established by Baba Tapasvi Narayan Das in the village. The present Mahant of the shrine is Baba Sukhdev Ji Maharaj. There is a famous Lord Shiva temple called Baba Dhaneshwar Nath Mahadev Mandir in the premises of the shrine. It is the first Shiva Panchayatan Mandir in North Bihar. The Bagahi Dham shrine is also famous for organizing 10-days grand Sitaram Naam Jap (chanting name of Sitaram) Mahayajna. A large number of Hindu devotees come here from different parts of India and Nepal.
