= Nawal Kishore Rai =

Indian politician (1960–2022)

Personal details
- Born: 1 January 1960 Chainpura, Sitamarhi, Bihar, India
- Died: 16 April 2022 (aged 62) Delhi, India
- Party: Janata Dal (United)
- Other political affiliations: Janata Dal
- Spouse: Smt. Ram Dulari Rai
- Children: 3
- Education: B.A., LL.B. Educated at Bihar University, Muzaffarpur 'Bihar

Nawal Kishore Rai (1 January 1960 – 16 April 2022) was a leader of Janata Dal (United) from Bihar. He served as member of the Lok Sabha representing Sitamarhi (Lok Sabha constituency). He was elected to 10th, 11th and 13th Lok Sabha. He was married to Smt. Ram Dulari Rai and lived in Sitamarhi, Bihar, India.

== Positions held ==
- 1989 - General-Secretary, Yuva Janata Dal, Bihar
- 1991 - Elected to 10th Lok Sabha
- 1991-93 - Member, Committee on Government Assurances; Vice-President, Yuva Janata Dal
- 1991 onwards - Member, National Youth Programme
- 1991-96 - Member, Consultative Committee, Ministry of Railways
- 1993 onwards - President, Yuva Janata Dal
- 1994-96 - Convenor, Sub-Committee of Standing Committee, Ministry of Industry
- 1996 - Re-elected to 11th Lok Sabha (2nd term)
- 1996-97 - Chairman, House Committee
- 1999 - Re-elected to 13th Lok Sabha (3rd term)
- 1999-2000 - Member, Committee on Railways; Member, Joint Committee on Offices of Profit.

== Other information ==
- Took active part in J.P. Movement during 1974-77 and was jailed for participating in a movement organized by Karpoori Thakur.
- participated in Kisan Movement, 1980–81; organized movement against Bihar Press Bill.
- 1983-84 and a students movement in Sitamarhi District, Bihar.

== Death ==
Rai died on 16 April 2022 in Delhi.
