= Samajwadi Janata Dal (Democratic) =

- Abbreviation: SJDD
- President: Devendra Prasad Yadav
- Founder: Devendra Prasad Yadav
- Founded: 2010 (16 years ago)
- Merged into: Rashtriya Janata Dal
- Headquarters: 14, Dr. Bishambhar Das Marg, New Delhi, 110001
- Youth wing: Youth Brigade Samajwadi Janata Dal Democratic.
- Ideology: Secularism; Socialism; Social Justice
- National affiliation: Socialist Secular Morcha (2015-2020); GDSF(2020-2020)
- Colours: Green and Red

Election symbol
- Air Conditioner

Samajwadi Janata Dal (Democratic) was a political party in India. Devendra Prasad Yadav is the leader of the party. The election symbol of the party is an air conditioner. On 24 March 2022, SJD(D) merged with Rashtriya Janata Dal.

== History ==
Party was founded by Devendra Prasad Yadav in year 2010. Party was a member of Grand Democratic Secular Front formed with All India Majlis-e-Ittehadul Muslimeen leader Asaduddin Owaisi.
