= Shahid Ali Khan (politician) =

Indian politician

Bihar Legislative Assembly
- In office February 2005 – March 2010
- Constituency: Pupri

Bihar Legislative Assembly
- In office 2000 – February 2005
- In office 1990–1995
- Constituency: Sitamarhi

National working president of Hindustani Awam Morcha
- In office 2015–2018

Bihar Legislative Assembly
- In office 2010–2015
- Preceded by: Jainandan Prasad Yadav
- Constituency: Sursand

Personal details
- Party: Hindustani Awam Morcha
- Other political affiliations: Janata Dal; Rashtriya Janata Dal; Janata Dal (United)
- Children: 3

Shahid Ali Khan was an Indian politician from the state of Bihar.

== Biography ==
Khan was first elected to the Bihar Legislative Assembly in the 1990 election from the Sitamarhi constituency as a member of the Janata Dal. At the time, he was the youngest member of the Bihar Legislative Assembly.

He was re-elected from Sitamarhi in the 2000 election on the Rashtriya Janata Dal ticket. He later represented the Pupri constituency in the February 2005 and October 2005 elections, and the Sursand constituency in the 2010 election, all on the Janata Dal (United) ticket.

In the 2014 Indian general election, Khan contested the Sheohar Lok Sabha constituency as a candidate of the Janata Dal (United) but was unsuccessful.

Between 1990 and 1995, Khan served as Chairman of the Bihar Industrial Area Development Authority. He later held ministerial portfolios in the Government of Bihar, including Minority Welfare, Law, and Information Technology.

Shahid Ali Khan died on 5 January 2018 in Ajmer, Rajasthan.
