= Niranjani Sampradaya =

Hindu sect

Niranjani Sampardaya

Founder
- Haridas Niranjani

Regions with significant populations
- Indian subcontinent

Religions
- Sant Mat

Scriptures
- Niranjani Vani

The Niranjani Sampradaya (Hindi: निरंजनी सम्प्रदाय; Nirañjanī Saṃpradāya) or Niranjani Panth is a sect (sampradaya) of Hinduism composed of householders, monks, and saint-poets, which developed in the late 16th and early 17th centuries in Rajasthan and expanded its influence in the second half of the 17th and 18th centuries. The written teachings consists of nirguna and yoga, with Vaishnavist influence. It is a nirguṇa bhakti sant tradition that primarily worships Rama and Sita. Sikar in Rajasthan is the traditional centre of the sect. The current monastic centre is Gadha Dham in Deedwana, Rajasthan.

== History ==
Painting of Haridas Niranjani, founder of the Niranjani Sampradaya

The sampradaya was founded in Didwana by the 16th-century Bhakti movement poet-saint Haridas Niranjani (lifetime dated variously between 1417 and 1645) which arose in Rajasthan, with the founder espousing the life of a householder and detachment from temporal duties via religious devotion and donation. Much of what is known about Haridas comes from literary sources, such as the Dayāl Jī kī Pañc Paracai of Hariramdas (composed in c. 1738–1779) and the Paracāī of Raghunathdas (composed in c. 1800), or oral tradition. Haridas had abandoned the way of a householder for renunciation but urged his followers to forgo worldly attachments (to famuly or wealth) but not worldly responsibilities, such as in producing a family or wealth. As the 17th century progressed, the sect spread to the localities of Nagaur, Ajmer, Jodhpur, Fatehpur, and Pokhran, with many of its followers coming from the Bihani division of the Maheshwari mercantile caste. A later figure of the sect was Amardas (d. 1785), a guru and saint-poet of the tradition, whose samādhi (funerary monument) is located in Didwana. Another figure was Rupdas Niranjani, who completed a voluminous pothī work in late May 1830.

== Literature ==
Pads of Baba Haridas Niranjani, Ms. 11583 (1672 CE?), Rajasthan Oriental Research Institute, Folio 20b

Their literary tradition comprises nirguni adhyatma literature, consisting of hymns, poetry, commentaries, and metaphysics. The Niranjani Vani, which is their scripture, is dated to be from the 17th and 18th centuries. The Niranjani scripture is part of a scriptural genre known as vānī, which consists of its sākhī contents being organized by theme and the hymns being organized by raga (musical mode). The scripture contains verses attributed to Namdev and Kabir.

Owing to the comparatively high literacy rates found in the community historically, they produced much of their own literature (usually in Sanskrit or Braj) but also prepared copies of works by authors belonging to other sects. As per one dictum, Niranjani followers were sent to Varanasi to become learnt, they returned with various works authored by the likes of Dadu Dayal, Tulsidas, and Biharilal. The Niranjani writer Rupadas later produced a work similar to the Bhaktamal. Another prominent Niranjani writer was Bhagvandas, who authored didactic and poetic works.

== Relationship to other religious traditions ==
The sect shares similarities to the Dadupanth, which also arose in Rajasthan during the same period, and to the Sikhs. Other religious influences include the Naths, Ramanandis, and more Sanskritic traditions, while secular influences include the Mughals and Rajput rulers. The sect is part of the four panths mentioned by the writer Raghavdas in his Bhaktamal version, alongside the Dadupanthis, Kabirpanthis, and Sikhs.

== See also ==
- Kabir panth
- Ram Charan (guru)
- Dadu Dayal
- Ravidassia
- Radha Vallabha Sampradaya
