= Haridas Niranjani =

Indian saint poet

Saint Haridas Niranjani as depicted in a reproduction of an older oil painting, used as part of an announcement for a religious gathering during 2011.

Haridas Niranjani (died 1601? or c. 1644; Hindi हरिदास निरंजनी; Haridās Nirañjanī) was a nirguna Indian saint poet believed to have lived sometime between 1417 to 1645. Tyler Williams places him in the late 16th century. He taught a form of nirgun bhakti that combined yoga with prem-bhakti.

Hagiographies in Brajbhasha (a literary dialect of Hindi) report that Haridas was a native of Kapadod village near the town of Didwana in modern-day Rajasthan. Some hagiographical sources suggest that he was a dacoit before being converted to the worship of nirguṇ rām by a holy man (sometimes identified as the yogi Gorakhnath). Haridas is recognized as the founder of the Niranjani Sampraday, a bhakti religious community primarily based in central Rajasthan. Most of Haridas's poetic compositions are in the form of hymns (pad), candrayan, and diptyches (sākhī), but he also composed several longer works in various meters. In his attributed works, he claims Gorakhnath and Kabir to be his gurus but his teachings show similarities also to those of Ravidas and Dadu Dayal.
