= Sita =

Major goddess in Hinduism and consort of Rama

- Mother Goddess; Goddess of Beauty, Devotion and Virtue; Supreme Goddess in Ramaism
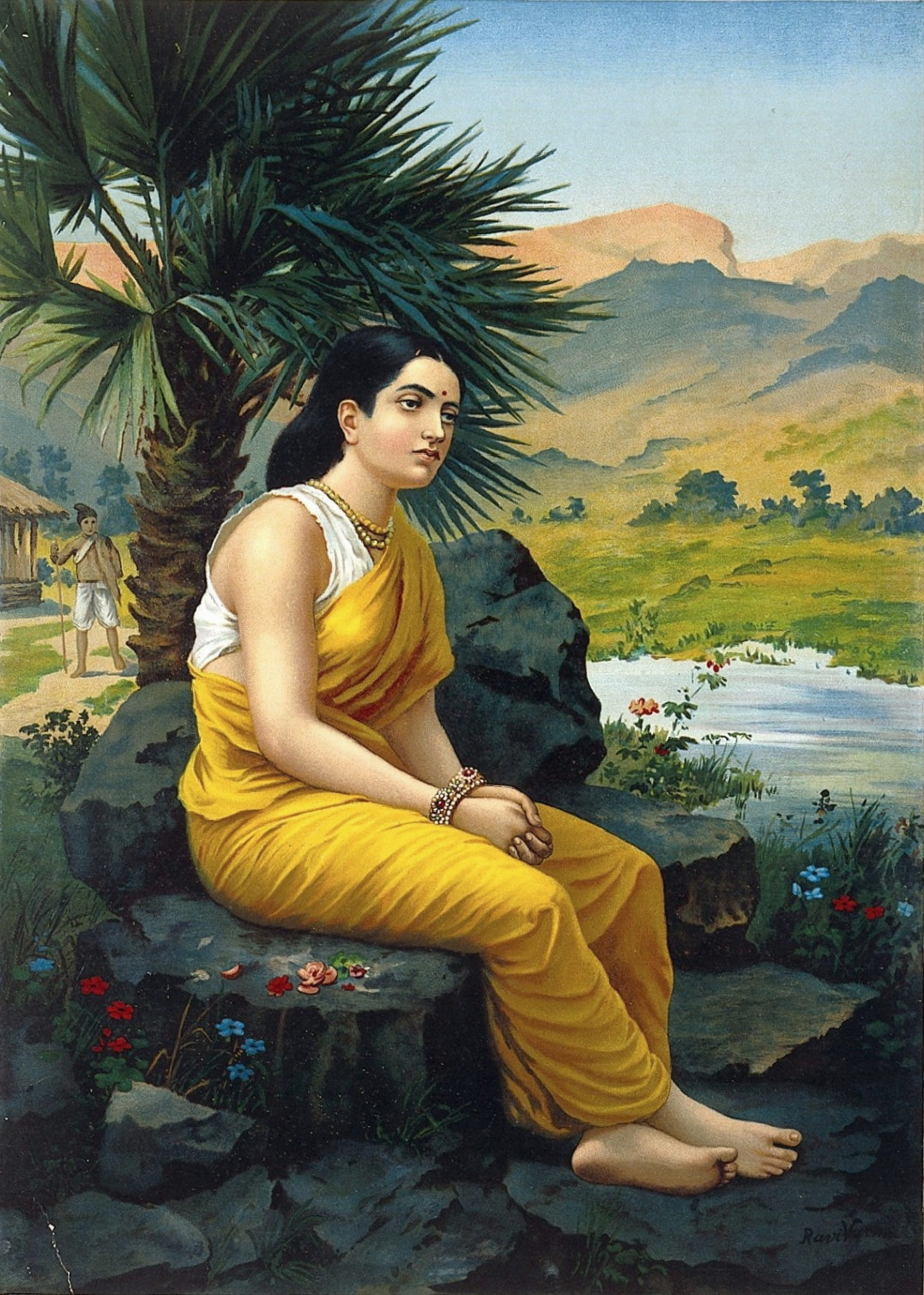
- Lithograph of Sita in exile
- Other names: Siya; Janaki; Maithili; Vaidehi; Ayonija; Bhumija; Seethai; Seetha Piratti
- Devanagari: सीता
- Sanskrit transliteration: Sītā
- Venerated in: Ramanandi Sampradaya; Niranjani Sampradaya; Shaktism
- Affiliation: Avatar of Lakshmi; Vaishnavism; Shaktism; Devi
- Abode: Ayodhya; Saketa; Vaikuntha
- Mantra: Jai Siya Ram; Sita-Ram-Sita-Ram; Siyavar Ramchandra Ki Jai
- Symbol: Pink Lotus
- Day: Friday
- Texts: Ramayana and its other versions; Mahabharata; Maithili Maha Upanishad; Sita Upanishad; Padma Purana; Shiva Purana; Skanda Purana; Vishnu Purana; Brahmanda Purana; Valmiki Samhita; Vaishnava Matabja Bhaskara; Vinaya Patrika; Raghuvamsa; Ramopakhyana
- Gender: Female
- Temple: Punaura Dham, Sitamarhi; Jānakī Mandir, Janakpur
- Festivals: Sita Navami; Janaki Jayanti; Vivaha Panchami; Diwali; Vijayadashami

Genealogy
- Avatar birth: Mithila
- Avatar end: Kosala
- Parents: Bhumi (mother); Janaka (adoptive father); Sunayana (adoptive mother)
- Siblings: Urmila (sister); Mandavi (cousin); Shrutakirti (cousin)
- Consort: Rama
- Children: Lava (son); Kusha (son)
- Dynasty: Vidēha (by birth); Raghuvamsha-Suryavamsha (by marriage)

Sita (Sanskrit: सीता; IAST: Sītā), also known as Siya, Jānaki and Maithili, is a Hindu goddess and the female protagonist of the Hindu epic Ramayana. Sita is the consort of Rama, the avatar of god Vishnu, and is regarded as an avatar of goddess Lakshmi. She is the chief goddess of the Ramanandi Sampradaya and is the goddess of beauty and devotion. Sita's birthday is celebrated every year on the occasion of Sita Navami.

Described as the daughter of Bhūmi (the earth), Sita is brought up as the adopted daughter of King Janaka of Videha. Sita, in her youth, chooses Rama, the prince of Ayodhya, as her husband in a svayamvara. After the svayamvara, she accompanies her husband to his kingdom but later chooses to accompany him along with her brother-in-law Lakshmana in his exile. While in exile, the trio settles in the Dandaka forest from where she is abducted by Ravana, the Rakshasa king of Lanka. She is imprisoned in the garden of Ashoka Vatika in Lanka until she is rescued by Rama, who slays her captor.

After the war, in some versions of the epic, Rama asks Sita to undergo an Agni Pariksha (an ordeal of fire), by which she proves her chastity, before she is accepted by Rama. Such an episode of trial makes Lakshmana angry at Rama, for the first time. In some other versions of the epic, Maya Sita, an illusion created by Agni, takes Sita's place and is abducted by Ravana and suffers his captivity, while the real Sita hides in the fire. Some scriptures also mention her previous birth as Vedavati, a woman whom Ravana tries to molest.

After proving her purity, Rama and Sita return to Ayodhya, where they are crowned as king and queen. One day, a man questions Sita's fidelity and in order to prove her innocence and maintain both his own dignity and that of the kingdom, Rama sends the pregnant Sita into the forest. She takes shelter at Sage Valmiki's ashram. She gives birth to twin sons there: Kusha and Lava. Years later, Sita reunites her two sons with their father Rama and then returns to the womb of her mother, the earth, as a testimony to her ultimate purity.

== Etymology and other names ==
The goddess is best known by the name "Sita", derived from the Sanskrit word sīta, ("furrow".)

According to Ramayana, Janaka found her while ploughing as a part of a yajna and adopted her. The word Sīta was a poetic term which signified fertility and the many blessings coming from settled agriculture. The Sita of the Ramayana may have been named after a more ancient Vedic goddess Sita, who is mentioned once in the Rigveda as an earth goddess who blesses the land with good crops. In the Vedic period, she was one of the goddesses associated with fertility. Rigveda 4.53.6, addressed to Agricultural Divinities, states

Become inclined our way, well-portioned Furrow. We will extol you,

so that you will be well-portioned for us, so that you will be well-fruited for us.

- Translated by Jamison and Brereton

In Harivamsa, Sita is invoked as one of the names of the goddess Arya:

O goddess, you are the altar's center in the sacrifice,

The priest's fee
Sita to those who hold the plough

And Earth to all living beings.

The Kausika-sutra and the Paraskara-sutra associate her repeatedly as the wife of Parjanya (a god associated with rains) and Indra.

Sita is known by many epithets. She is called Jānaki as the daughter of Janaka and Maithili as the princess of Mithila. As the wife of Rama, she is called Ramā. Her father Janaka had earned the sobriquet Videha due to his ability to transcend body consciousness; Sita is therefore also known as Vaidehi.

== Legends ==
=== Birth and early life ===
Various places have been claimed to be the birthplace of Sita in local lores. These include the Sita Kund pilgrimage site in present-day Sitamarhi district, Bihar, India. Apart from Sitamarhi, Janakpur, which is located in the present-day Madhesh Province, Nepal, has also been claimed to be her birthplace.

Other versions

- Janaka's biological daughter: In Ramopkhyana of the Mahabharata and also in Paumachariya of Vimala Suri, Sita has been depicted as Janaka's biological daughter. According to Rev. Fr. Camille Bulcke, this motif that Sita was the biological daughter of Janaka, as described in Ramopkhyana Mahabharata was based on the authentic version of Valmiki Ramayana. Later, the story of Sita miraculously appearing in a furrow was inserted in Valmiki Ramayana.
- Ramayana Manjari: In Ramayana Manjari (verses 344–366), North-western and Bengal recensions of Valmiki Ramayana, it has been described as on hearing a voice from the sky and then seeing Menaka, Janaka expresses his wish to obtain a child, and when he finds the child, he hears the same voice again telling him the infant is his spiritual child, born of Menaka.
- Reincarnation of Vedavati: Some versions of the Ramayana suggest that Sita was a reincarnation of Vedavati. Ravana tried to molest Vedavati and her chastity was sullied beyond Ravana's redemption when she was performing penance to become the consort of Vishnu. Vedavati immolated herself on a pyre to escape Ravana's lust, vowing to return in another age and be the cause of Ravana's destruction. She was duly reborn as Sita.
- Reincarnation of Manivati: According to Gunabhadra's Uttara Purana of the ninth century CE, Ravana disturbs the asceticism of Manivati, daughter of Amitavega of Alkapuri, and she pledges to take revenge on Ravana. Manivati is later reborn as the daughter of Ravana and Mandodari. But astrologers predicted the ruin of Ravana because of this child. So, Ravana gives orders to kill the child. Manivati is placed in a casket and buried in the ground of Mithila, where she is discovered by some of the farmers of the kingdom. Then Janaka, king of that state, adopts her.
- Ravana's daughter: In Sanghadasa's Jaina version of Ramayana, and also in Adbhuta Ramayana, Sita, entitled Vasudevahindi, is born as the daughter of Ravana. According to this version, astrologers predict that the first child of Vidyadhara Maya (Ravana's wife) will destroy his lineage. Thus, Ravana abandons her and orders the infant to be buried in a distant land where she is later discovered and adopted by Janaka.

Sita has a younger sister Urmila, born to Janaka and Sunayna, whom she was the closest among her three sisters. Her father's younger brother, Kushadhvaja's daughters Mandavi and Shrutakirti grew up with them in Mithila.

=== Marriage to Rama ===
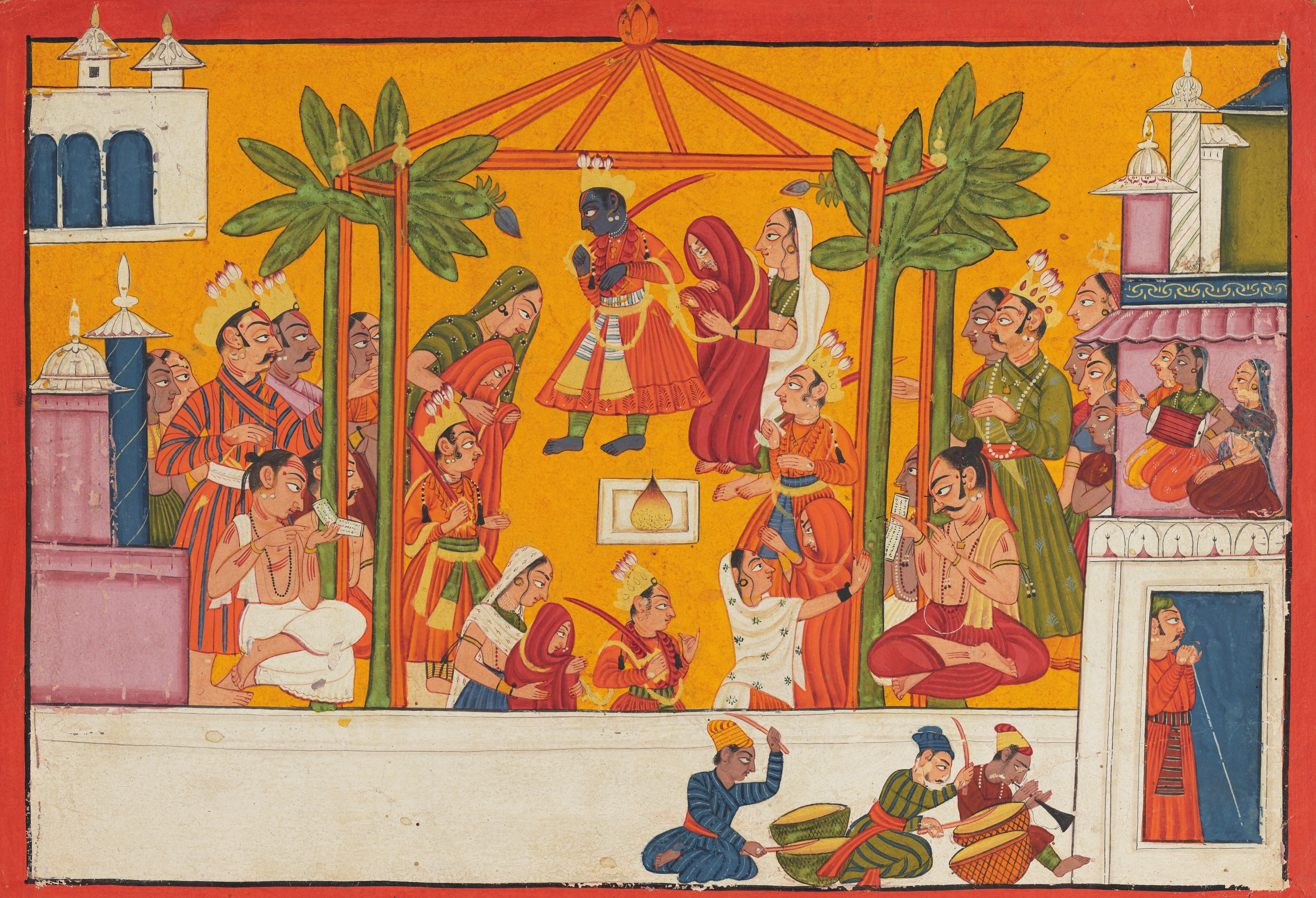
The marriage of the four sons of Dasharatha with the four daughters of Siradhvaja Janaka and Kushadhvaja. Rama and Sita, Lakshmana and Urmila, Bharata and Mandavi and Shatrughna with Shrutakirti. Folio from the Shnagri Ramayana, early 18th-century. National Museum, New Delhi

When Sita reached adulthood, Janaka conducted a svayamvara ceremony at his capital with the condition that she would marry only a prince who would possess the strength to string the Pinaka, the bow of the deity Shiva. Many princes attempted and failed to string the bow. During this time, Vishvamitra had brought Rama and his brother Lakshmana to the forest for the protection of a yajna (ritual sacrifice). Hearing of the svayamvara, Vishvamitra asked Rama to participate in the ceremony with the consent of Janaka, who agreed to offer Sita's hand in marriage to the prince if he could fulfil the requisite task. When the bow was brought before him, Rama seized the centre of the weapon, fastened the string taut, and broke it in two in the process. Witnessing his prowess, Janaka agreed to marry his daughter to Rama and invited Dasharatha to his capital.

King Dasharatha arrived in Mithila for his son's wedding and noticed that Lakshmana had feelings for Urmila, but according to tradition, Bharata and Mandavi were to marry first. He then arranged for Bharata to marry Mandavi and Shatrughna to marry Shrutakirti, allowing Lakshmana to marry Urmila. Ultimately, all four sisters married the four brothers, strengthening the alliance between the two kingdoms. A wedding ceremony was conducted under the guidance of Shatananda. During the homeward journey to Ayodhya, another avatar of Vishnu, Parashurama, challenged Rama to combat, on the condition that Rama could string the bow of Vishnu, Sharanga. When Rama obliged him with success, Parashurama acknowledged the former to be a form of Vishnu and departed to perform penance at Mount Mahendra. The wedding entourage then reached Ayodhya and they entered the city amid great fanfare.

=== Exile and abduction ===
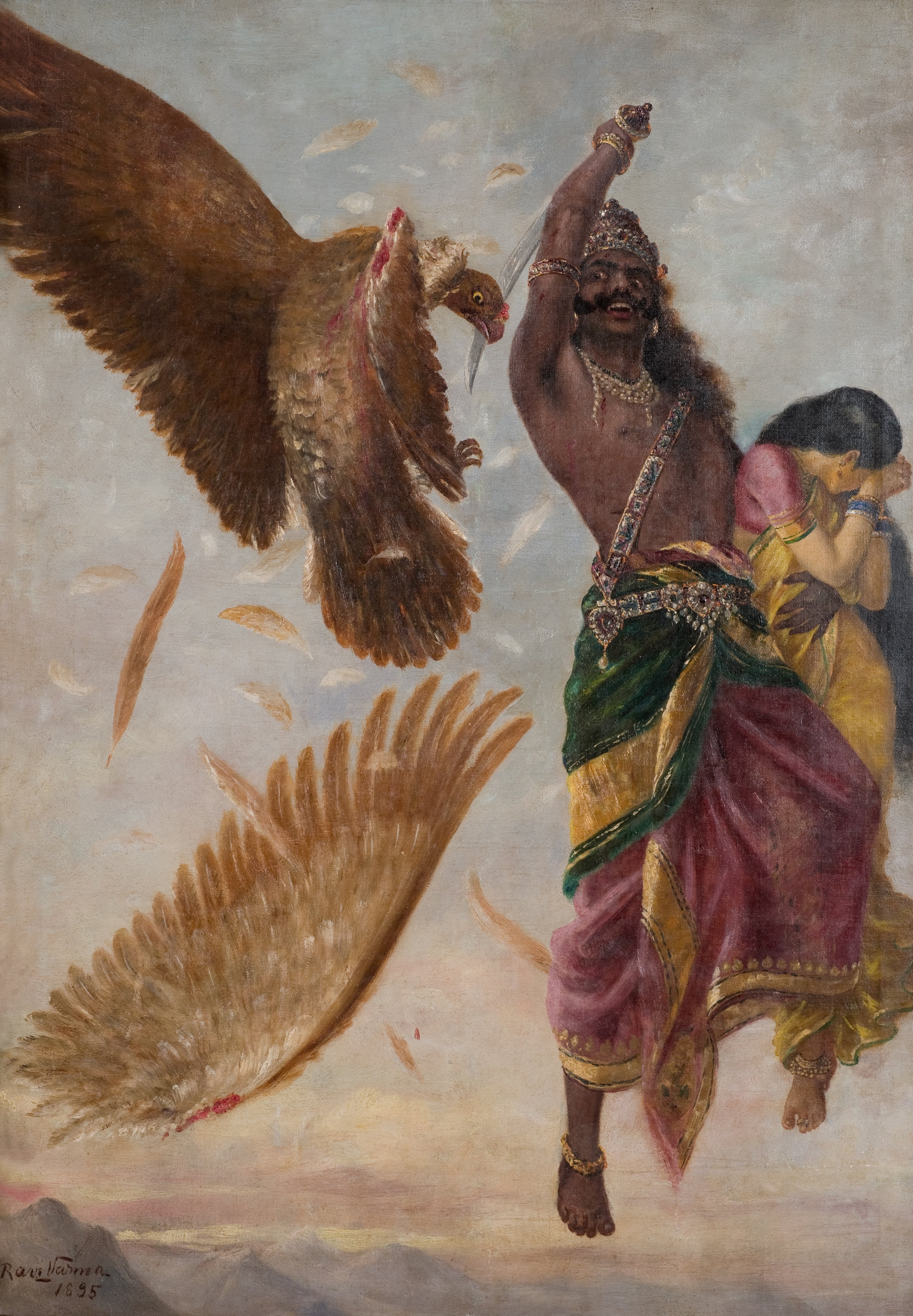
Ravana cuts off Jatayu's wing while abducting Sita

Some time after Ram and Sita's wedding, Kaikeyi, the second queen of King Dasharatha, compelled Dashratha to make her son Bharata the king instead of Rama. Kaikeyi was prompted by the coaxing of her maid Manthara. Since Kaikeyi had two boons from Dasharatha granted to her years earlier, she used the two boons to make Bharata the king and forced Rama to leave Ayodhya and spend 14 years in exile in the forest. Sita and Lakshmana willingly renounced the comforts of the palace and joined Rama in exile.

The Panchavati forest (in Nashik, India) became the setting for Sita's abduction by Ravana, King of Lanka. There, Ravana's sister the demoness Shurpanakha expressed her love for Rama. However, when Shurpanakha approached Rama, he refused her stating that he was devoted to Sita. This enraged the demoness and she tried to kill Sita. Lakshmana cut Shurpanakha's nose and sent her back. Ravana, in order to take revenge for his sister decided to kidnap Sita, and made a plan. Maricha, his uncle, disguised himself as a magnificent deer to lure Sita. Sita, attracted to its golden glow asked her husband to make it her pet. When Rama and Lakshmana went far away from the hut, Ravana kidnapped Sita, disguising himself as a mendicant. Some versions of the Ramayana describe Sita taking refuge with the fire-god Agni, while Maya Sita, her illusionary double, is kidnapped by the demon-king. Jatayu, the vulture-king, tried to protect Sita but Ravana chopped off his wings. Jatayu survived long enough to inform Rama of what had happened.

Ravana took Sita back to his kingdom in Lanka and she was held as a prisoner in one of his palaces. During her captivity for a year in Lanka, Ravana expressed his desire for her; however, Sita refused his advances. Hanuman was sent by Rama to seek Sita and eventually succeeded in discovering Sita's whereabouts. Sita gave Hanuman her jewelery and asked him to give it to her husband. Hanuman returned across the sea to Rama.

Sita was finally rescued by Rama, who waged a war to defeat Ravana. Upon rescue, Rama makes Sita undergo a trial by fire to prove her chastity. In some versions of the Ramayana, during this test the fire-god Agni appears in front of Rama and attests to Sita's purity, or hands over to him the real Sita and declares it was Maya Sita who was abducted by Ravana. The Thai version of the Ramayana, however, tells of Sita walking on the fire, of her own accord, to feel clean. She is not burnt, and the coals turn to lotuses.

=== Later years and second exile ===
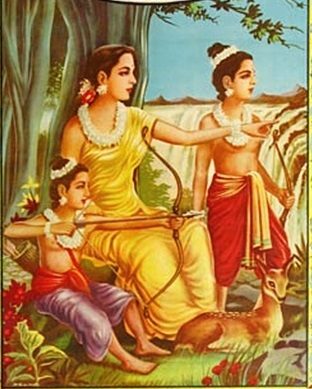
Sita with her two sons, Lava and Kusha

In the Uttara Kanda, following their return to Ayodhya, Rama was crowned as the king with Sita by his side. While Rama's trust and affection for Sita never wavered, it soon became evident that some people in Ayodhya could not accept Sita's long captivity under Ravana. They questioned Rama's decision to keep Sita as his queen, believing this example set by their king would inevitably be followed by his subjects. Rama was extremely distraught on hearing the news, but finally told Lakshmana that as a king, he had to make his citizens content and the purity of the queen of Ayodhya had to be above any gossip and rumour. With a heavy heart, he instructed Lakshmana to take Sita to a forest outside Ayodhya and leave her there.

Following her second exile, a pregnant Sita sought refuge in the hermitage of Valmiki, where she gave birth to twin sons, Lava and Kusha. Rama later requested her return to the royal assembly to attest to her purity. He acknowledged the twins as his sons and sought reconciliation. In response, Sita asserted her fidelity by calling upon her mother, the earth goddess Bhumi, to receive her. Bhumi emerged from the earth and descended back with Sita, amid praise from the assembly.

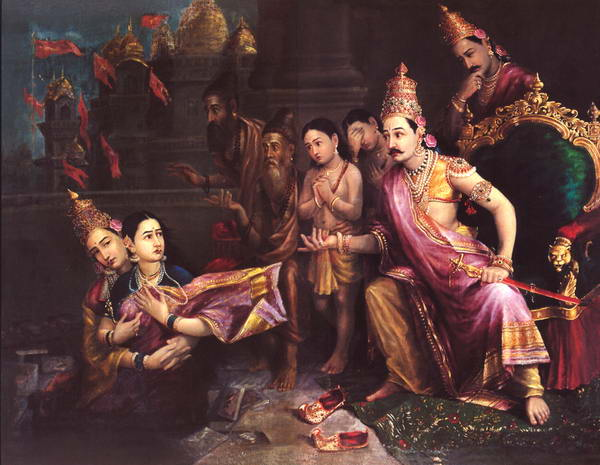
Sita returns to her mother, the Earth, as Rama, her sons, and the sages watch in astonishment.

According to the Padma Purana, Sita's exile during her pregnancy was because of a curse during her childhood. Sita had caught a pair of divine parrots, which were from Valmiki's ashram, when she was young. The birds were talking about a story of Rama heard in Valmiki's ashram, which intrigued Sita. She has the ability to talk with animals. The female bird was pregnant at that time. She requested Sita to let them go, but Sita only allowed her male companion to fly away, and the female parrot died because of the separation from her companion. As a result, the male bird cursed Sita that she would suffer a similar fate of being separated from her husband during pregnancy. The male bird was reborn as the washerman.

== Speeches ==
While the Ramayana mostly concentrates on Rama's actions, Sita also speaks many times during the exile. The first time is in the town of Chitrakuta where she narrates an ancient story to Rama, whereby Rama promises to Sita that he will never kill anybody without provocation.

The second time Sita is shown talking prominently is when she speaks to Ravana. Ravana has come to her in the form of a mendicant and Sita tells him that he does not look like one.

Some of her most prominent speeches are with Hanuman when he reaches Lanka. Hanuman wants an immediate union of Rama and Sita and thus he proposes that Sita ride on his back. Sita refuses as she does not want to run away like a thief; instead she wants her husband Rama to come and defeat Ravana to save her.

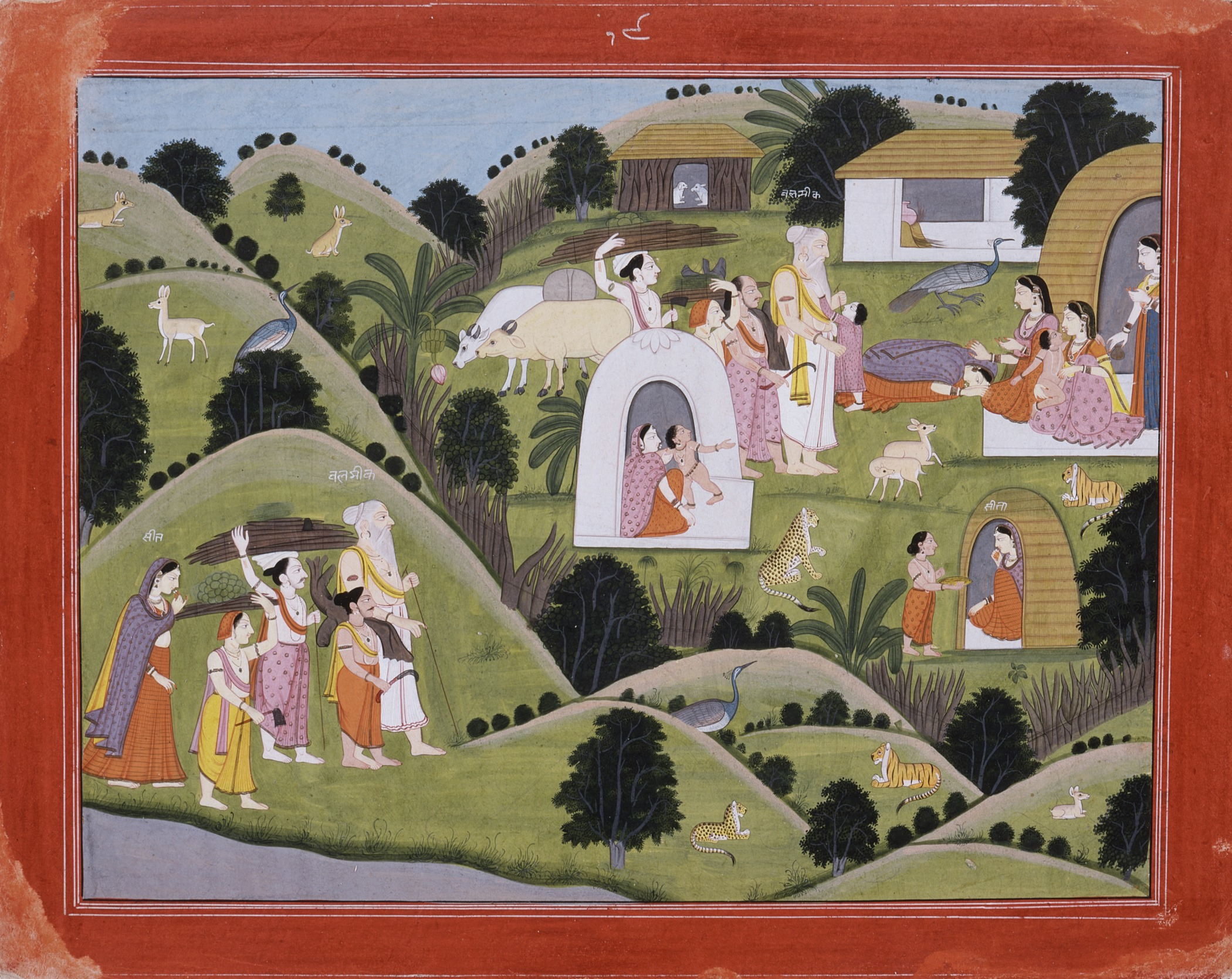
Sita in the hermitage of Valmiki

== Literature ==
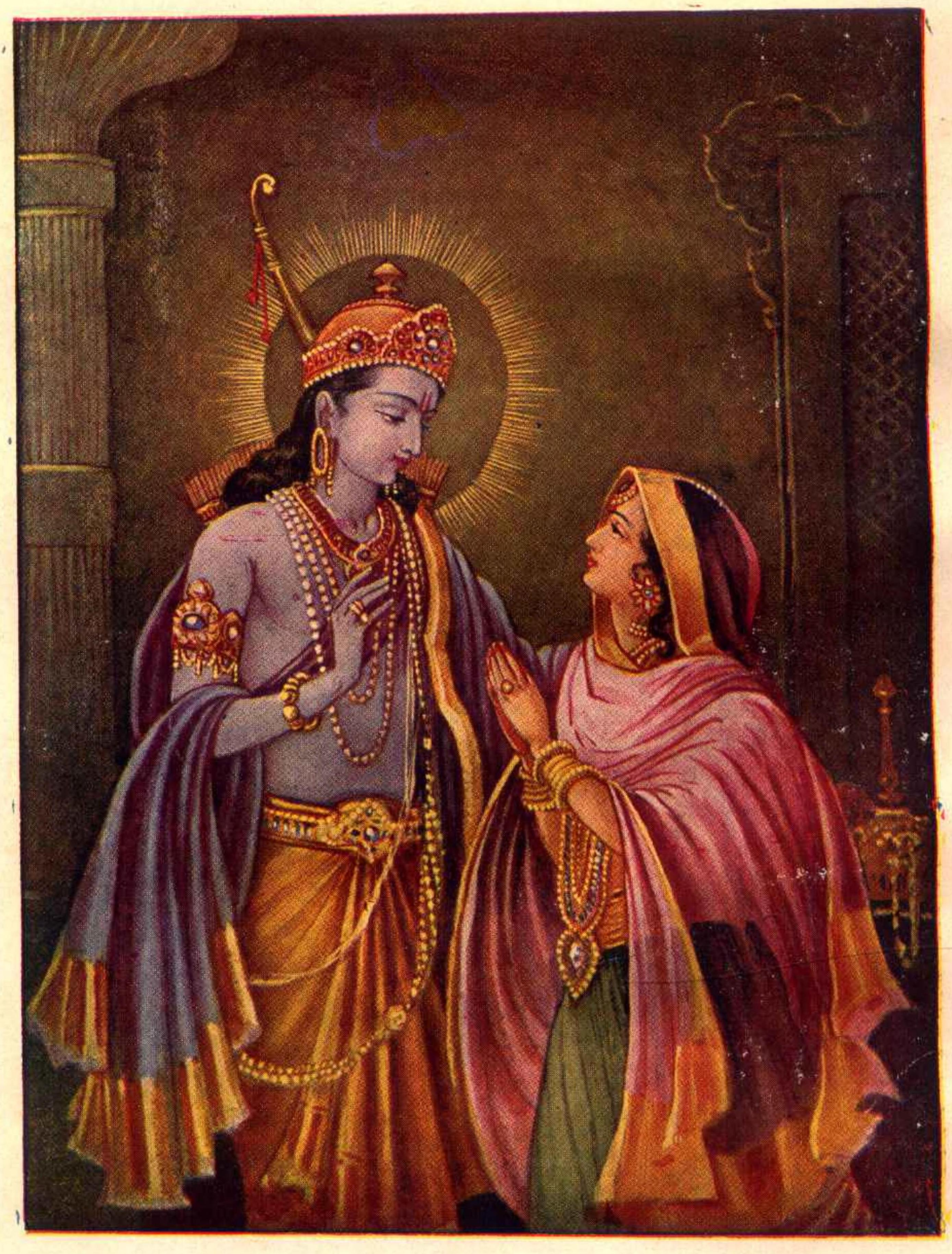
Sita with her husband Rama, in the Adhyatma Ramayana

Sita is an important goddess in the Vaishnavite traditions of Hinduism. She is regarded as the avatara of goddess Lakshmi, and is mentioned in various scriptures and texts of Hindu traditions. Sita is prominent in the minor Upanishad Sita Upanishad, which is attached to the Atharva Veda. The text identifies Sita with primordial Prakriti (nature) and her three powers are manifested in daily life as will (iccha), action (kriyā) and knowledge (jnana).

Sita appears in the Puranas namely the Vishnu Purana and Padma Purana (as an avatar of Lakshmi), the Matsya Purana (as form of Devi), the Linga Purana (as form of Lakshmi), the Kurma Purana, Agni Purana, Garuda Purana (as consort of Rama), the Skanda Purana and the Shiva Purana. She also finds mention in the Vana Parva of the Mahabharata.

Sita along with Rama appears in the Valmiki Samhita, which is attributed to their worship and describes them to be the ultimate reality. The 5th chapter, a dialogue between Sita and saptarishi, which is described to Parvati by Shiva, is known as the Maithili Mahopanishad.

भूर्भुवः स्वः । सप्तद्वीपा वसुमती । त्रयो लोकाः । अन्तरिक्षम् । सर्वे त्वयि निवसन्ति । आमोदः । प्रमोदः । विमोदः । सम्मोदः । सर्वांस्त्वं सन्धत्से । आञ्जनेयाय ब्रह्मविद्या प्रदात्रि धात्रित्वां सर्वे वयं प्रणमामहे प्रणमामहे ॥

The sages said: "In the earthly realm, the celestial space, and the heavenly realms, and in the seven continents on Earth, in the three worlds—heaven, mortal, and the netherworld. All these, including space and the sky, reside within you. You embody joy, delight, exhilaration, and bliss. Oh ultimate embodiment of Dhatrī! bestower of the Brahmavidya to Lord Hanuman! Oh sustainer of all realms, Sri Sita! We bow to you repeatedly."

Apart from other versions of Ramayana, many 14th-century Vaishnava saints such as Nabha Dass, Tulsidas and Ramananda have mentioned Sita, in their works. While Ramananda's Sri Ramarchan Paddati explains the complete procedure to worship Sita-Rama, Tulsidas's Vinaya Patrika has devotional hymns dedicated to her. Ramananda through his conversation with disciple Surasurananda in Vaishnava Matabja Bhaskara, explains about the worship of Rama, Sita and Lakshmana. Kalidasa's Raghuvamsa gives a detail account of Sita's svayamvara, abduct and her exile, in the cantos 10 to 15.

The Sanskrit text and minor Upanishad, Sita Upanishad describes Sita as the ultimate reality of the universe (Brahman), the ground of being (Spirituality), and material cause behind all manifestation. Sita, in many Hindu mythology, is the Devi associated with agriculture, fertility, food and wealth for continuation of humanity.

=== Sita and Radha ===
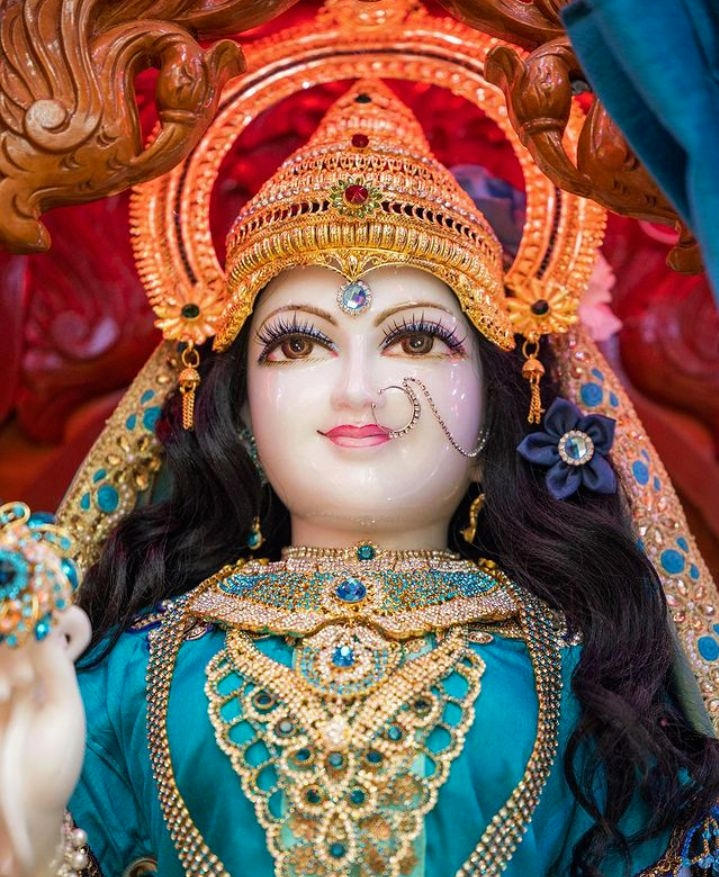
Bhagvati Sita

The Sita-Rama and Radha-Krishna pairs represent two different personality sets, two perspectives on dharma and lifestyles, both cherished in the way of life called Hinduism. Sita is traditionally wedded: the dedicated and virtuous wife of Rama, an introspective temperate paragon of a serious, virtuous man. Radha is a power potency of Krishna, who is a playful adventurer.

Sita and Radha offer two templates within the Hindu tradition. If "Sita is a queen, aware of her social responsibilities", states Heidi Pauwels, then "Radha is exclusively focused on her romantic relationship with her lover", giving two contrasting role models from two ends of the moral universe. Yet they share common elements as well. Both face life challenges and are committed to their true love. They are both influential, adored and beloved goddesses in the Hindu culture.

In worship of Rama, Sita is represented as a dutiful and loving wife, holding a position entirely subordinate to Rama. However, in the worship of Radha Krishna, Radha is often preferred over to Krishna, and in certain traditions, her name is elevated to a higher position compared to Krishna's.

== Sita in Ramayana traditions ==
=== Janaki Ramayana ===
The Janaki Ramayana is written by Pandit Lal Das. In this poetic form version, Sita is the central character of the epic. The life of Goddess Sita and her infinite powers have been described from the beginning to the end. There are three Khandas in the Janaki Ramayana: Kathārambha, Lakshmikaanda and Radhakaanda.

=== Adbhut Ramayana ===
The Adbhuta Ramayana is written by Valmiki himself and is shorter than the original epic. Sita is accorded far more prominence in this variant of the Ramayana narrative. During the war, Sahastra Ravana shoots an arrow at Rama, leaving him wounded and unconscious on the battlefield. Seeing Rama unconscious and helpless on the field, Sita gives up her human appearance and takes the horrific form of Mahakali. In less than a second, she severs Sahastra Ravana's 1000 heads and begins destroying rakshasas everywhere. Sita is eventually pacified by the gods, Rama's consciousness is restored and the story moves forward.

=== Mahaviracharita ===
The Sanskrit play Mahaviracharita by Bhavabhuti is based on the early life of Rama. According to the play, Vishwamitra invites Janaka to attend his sacrifice, but he sends his brother Kushadhvaja and daughters Sita and Urmila, as his delegates. This is the place, where Rama and Sita met for the first time. By the end of the act, Kushadhvaja and Vishwamitra decide to marry Sita and Urmila to Rama and Lakshamana.

=== Saptakanda Ramayana ===
Saptakanda Ramayana written by Madhava Kandali is a version of Ramayana known for its non-heroic portrayal of Rama, Sita, and other characters, which rendered the work unsuitable for religious purposes.

== Iconography ==
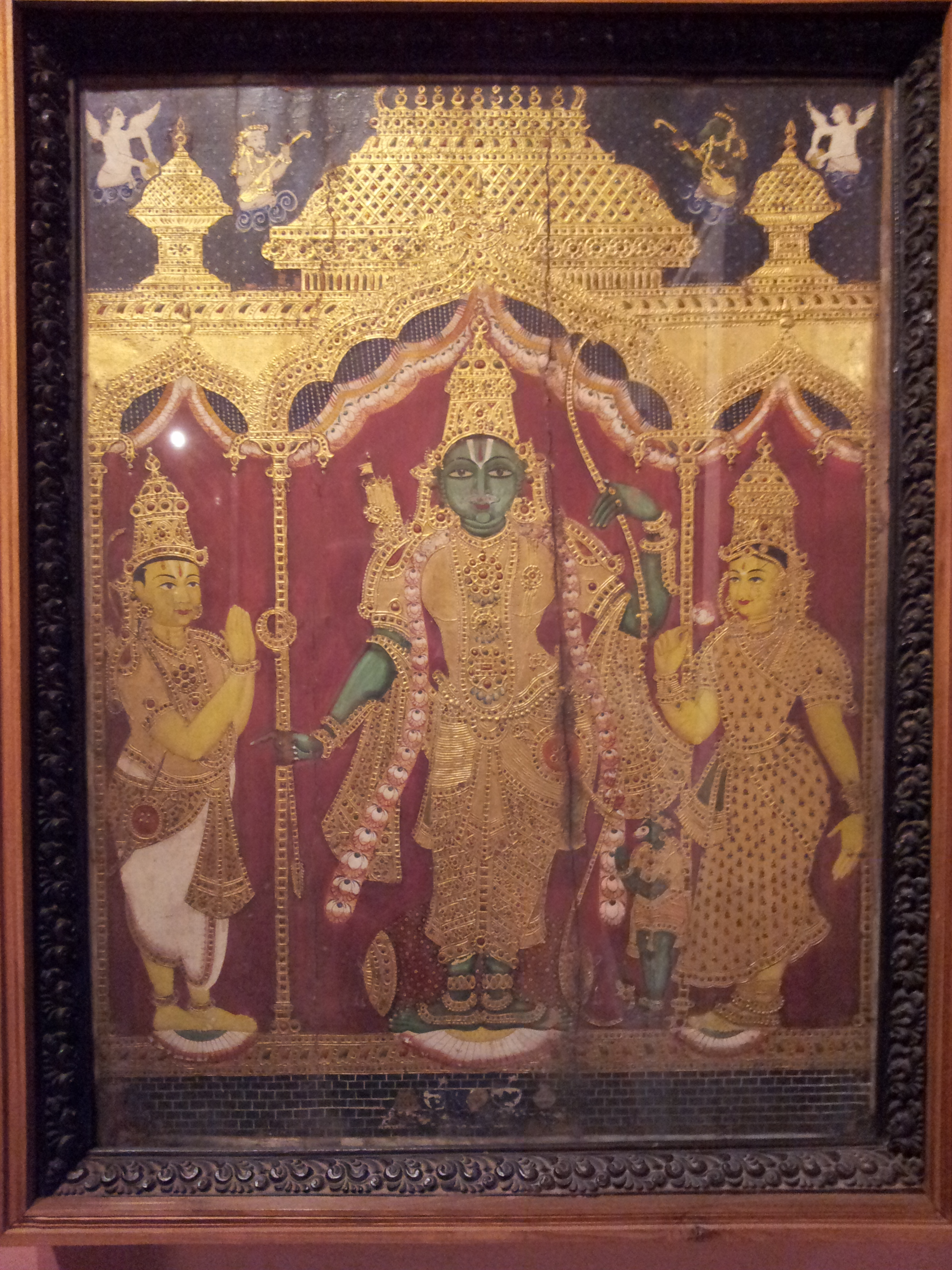
Rama with Lakshmana (left), Sita (right) and Hanuman at his feet. Tanjore painting, mid 19th century

Sita in Hinduism, is revered as the goddess of beauty and devotion. She is mostly depicted along with her husband Rama and is shakti or prakriti of Rama, as told in the Ram Raksha Stotram. Mithila art, which originated at Sita's birthplace depicts Sita and Rama's marriage ceremony through the paintings.

In Rama and Sita's temple, she is always placed on Rama's right, with a golden-yellow complexion. She is dressed in traditional sari or ghagra-choli along with a veil. Her jewelry is either made of metals, pearls or flowers.

Who is Sita?

सा देवी त्रिविधा भवति शक्त्यासना
इच्छाशक्तिः क्रियाशक्तिः साक्षाच्छक्तिरिति

That divine Being is threefold,
through her power, namely,
the power of desire,
the power of action,
the power of knowledge.

— Sita Upanishad verse 11

In the Ramayana, Sita is mostly depicted in saris and is called ethereal and divine. Praising her beauty in the Aranya Kanda, Ravana stated,

"Oh, rosy faced one, are you the personified numen of respect, renown or resplendence, or the felicitous Lakshmi herself, or oh, curvaceous one, are you a nymphal Apsara, or the numen of benefactress, or a self-motivated woman, or Rati devi, the consort of Manmatha, the Love God."

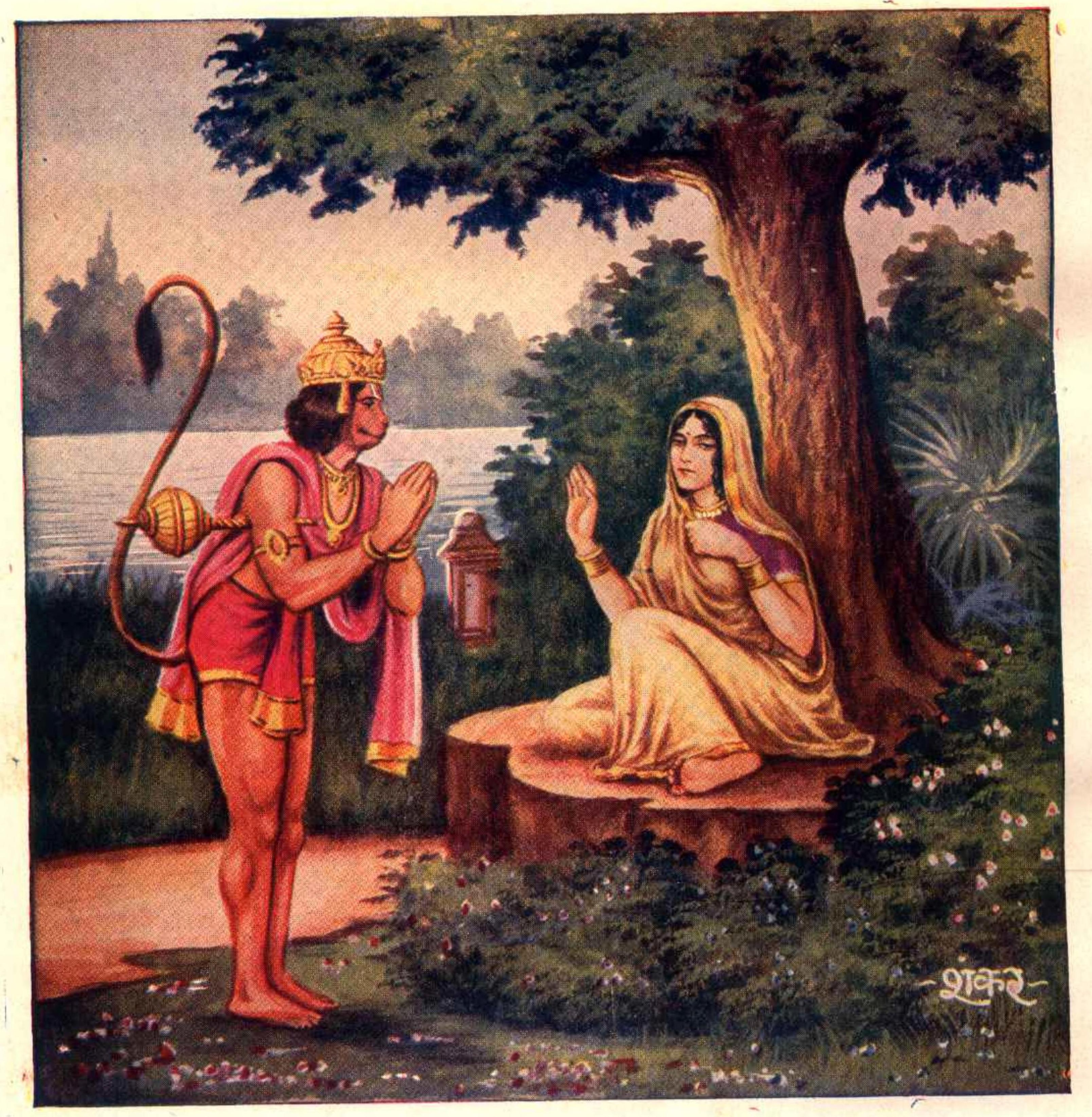
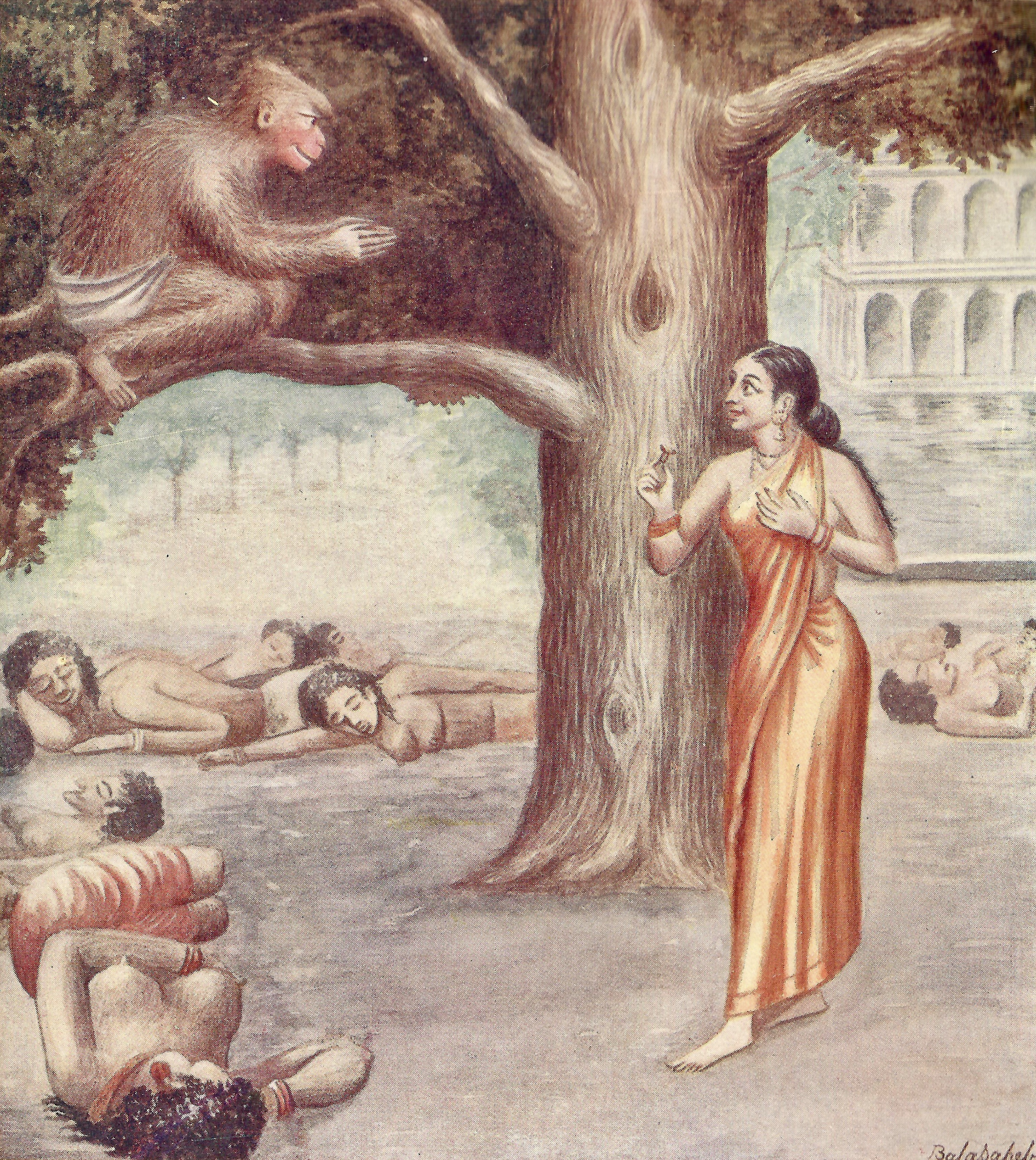
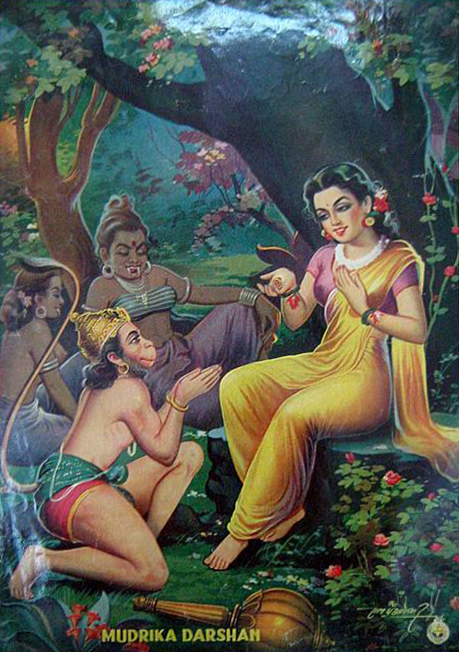
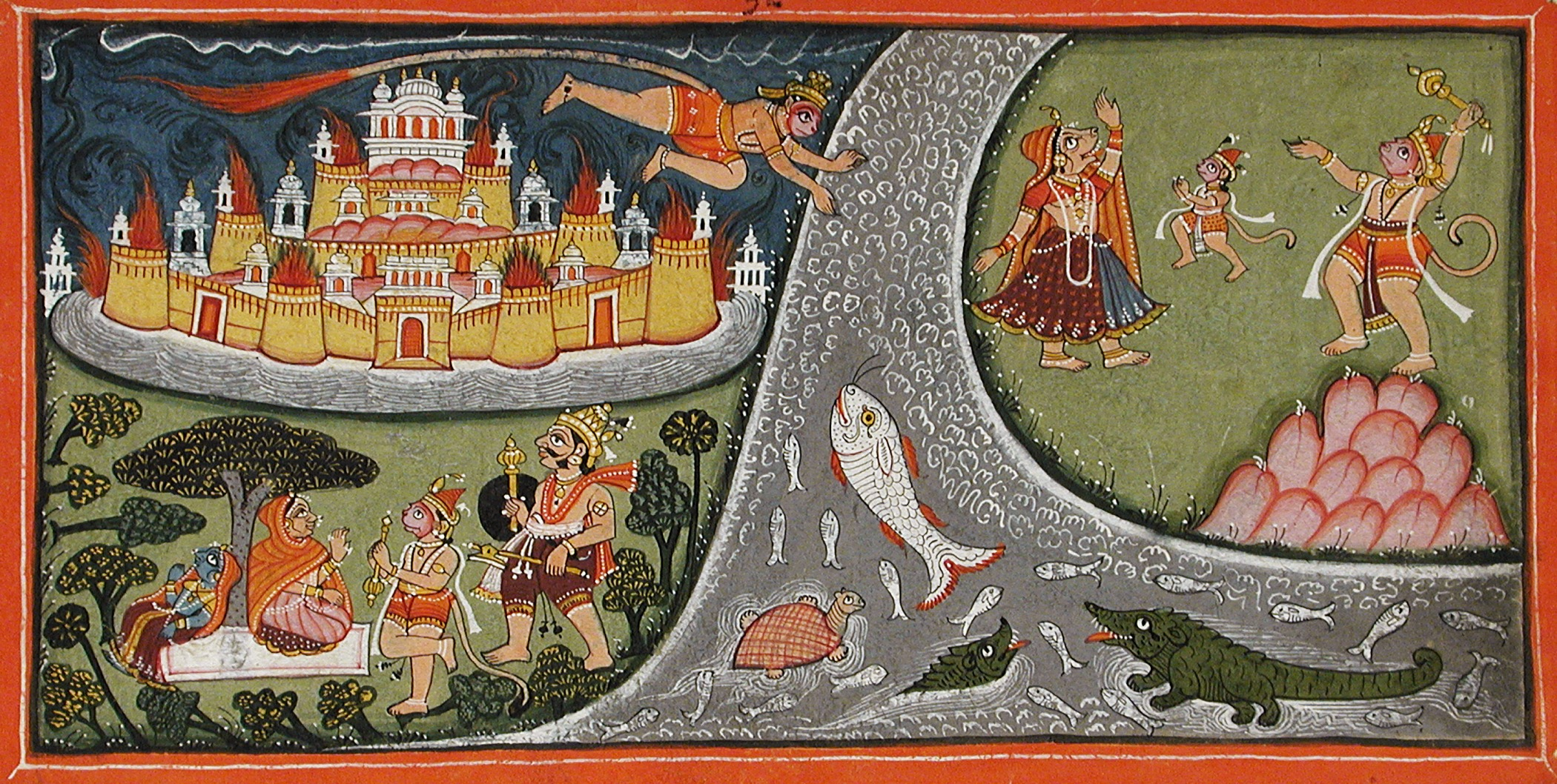
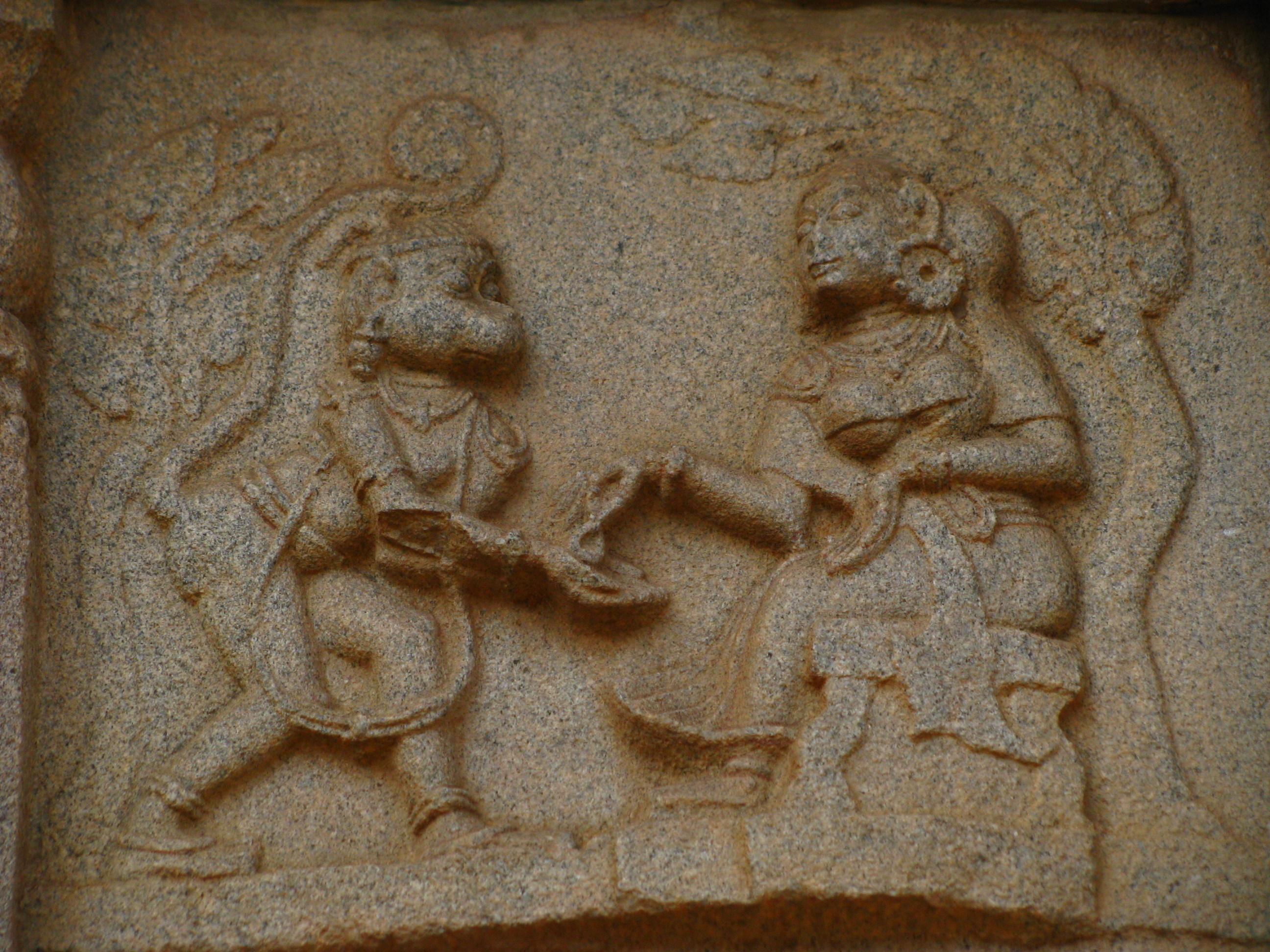
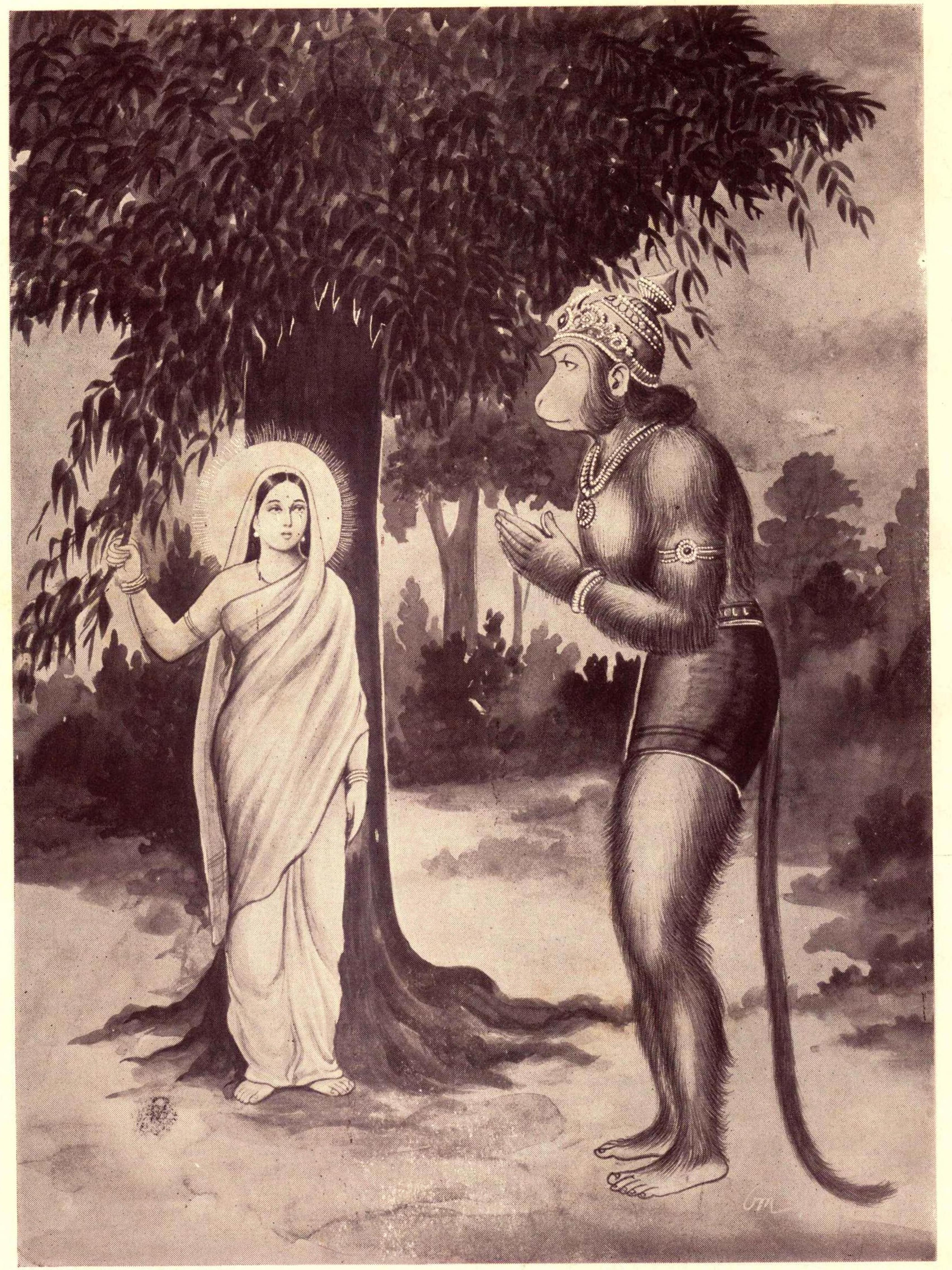
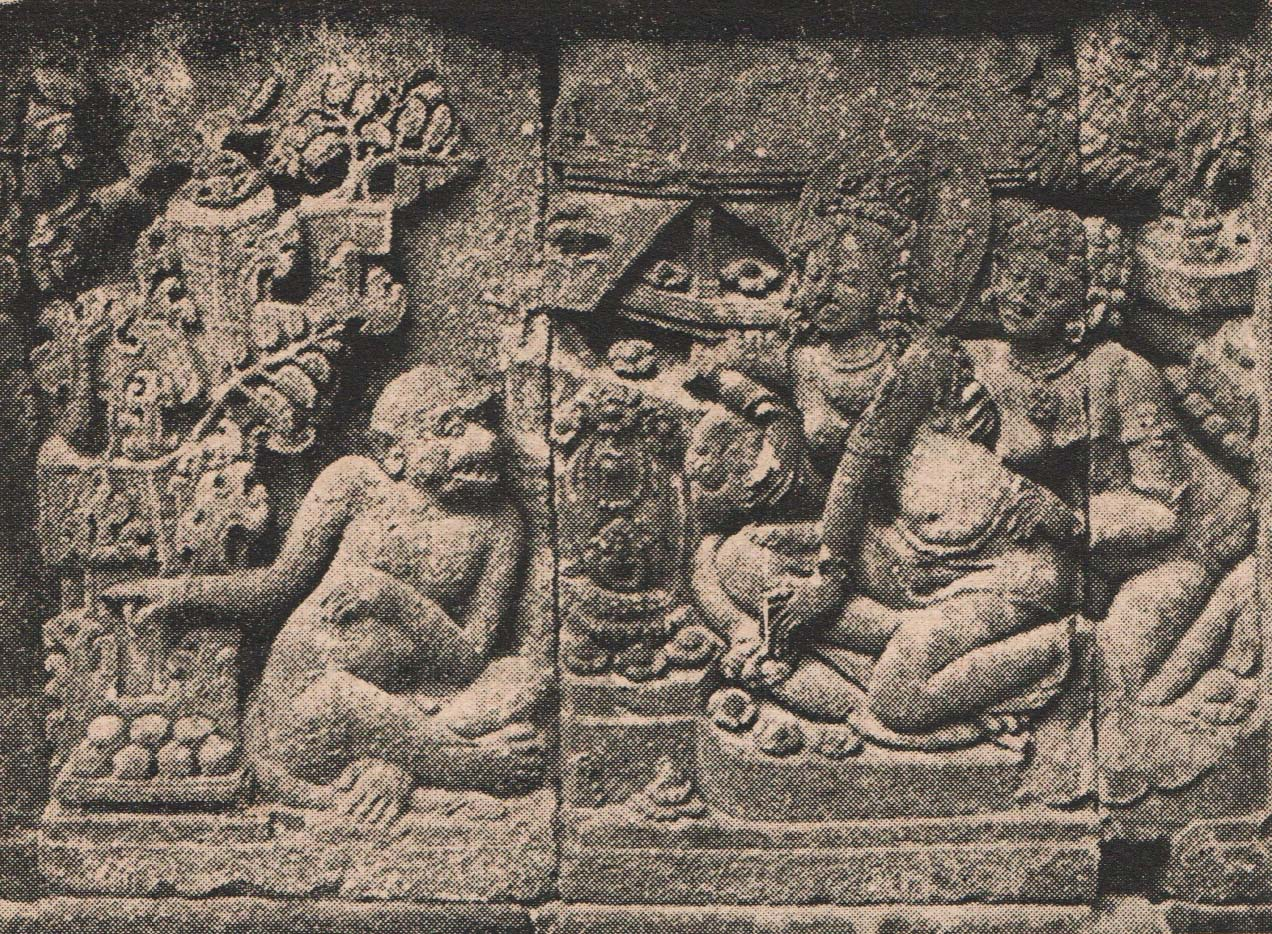
Iconography of Hanuman visiting Sita during her captivity in Lanka

== Outside Hinduism ==
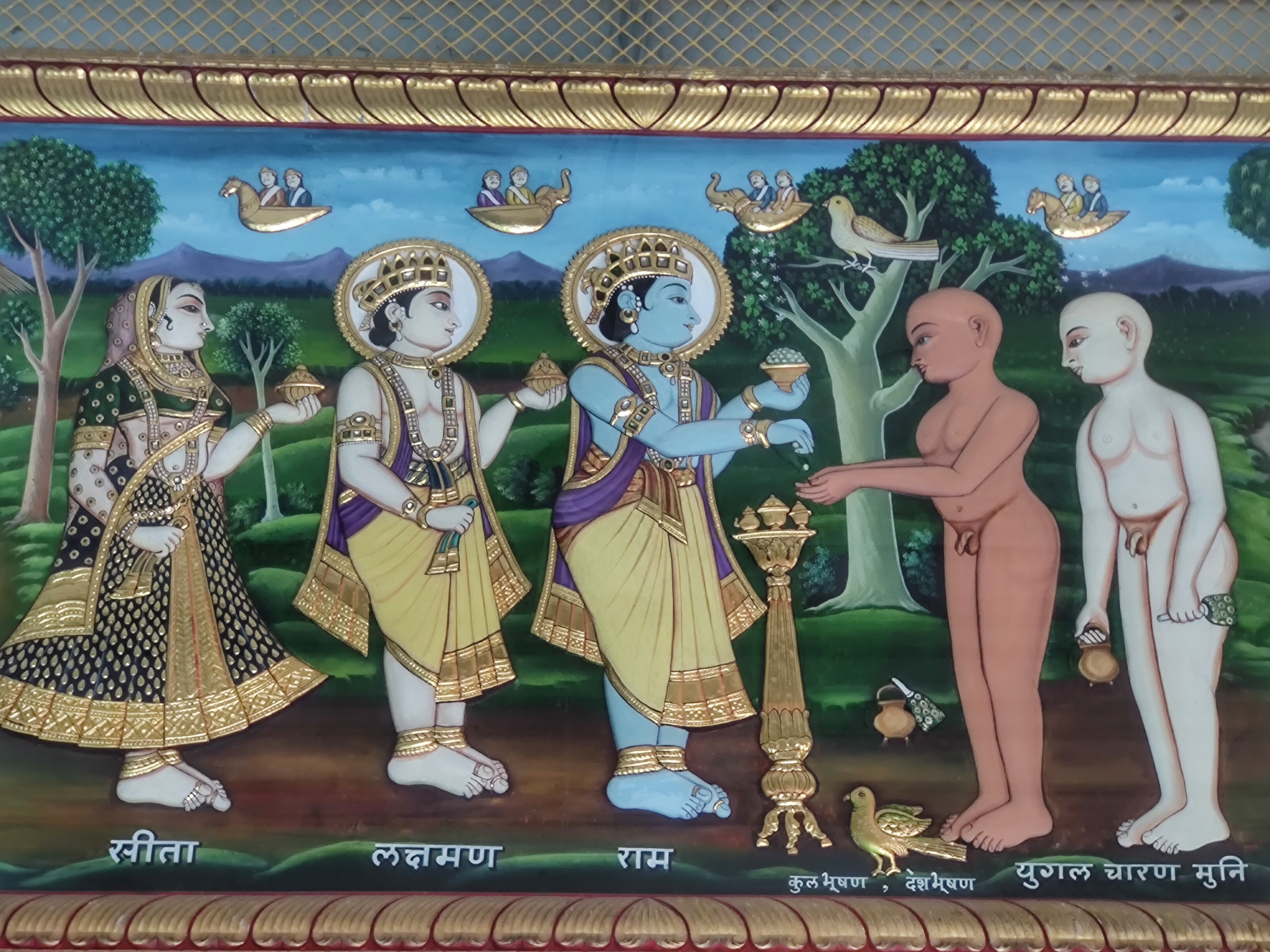
A depiction of Jain Ramayana at the Swarn Jain Temple, Gwalior

=== Jainism ===
Sita is the daughter of King Janak and Queen Videha of Mithalapuri. She has a brother named Bhamandal who is kidnapped soon after his birth by a deity due to animosity in a previous life. He is thrown into a garden of Rathnupur where he is dropped into the arms of King Chandravardhan of Rathnupur. The king and queen bring him up as their own son. Ram and Sita get married due to Bhamandal and in the course of events Bhamandal realises that Sita is his sister. It is then that he meets his birth parents.

=== Buddhism ===
The Dasaratha Jataka, a Buddhist tale, describes Rama, Sita and Lakshmana as siblings. They are not banished but sent away to the Himalayas by King Dasaratha in order to protect them from their jealous stepmother, the only antagonist. When things have cooled down, Rama and Sita return to Benaras (not Ayodhya) and get married.

== Portrayals and interpretations ==
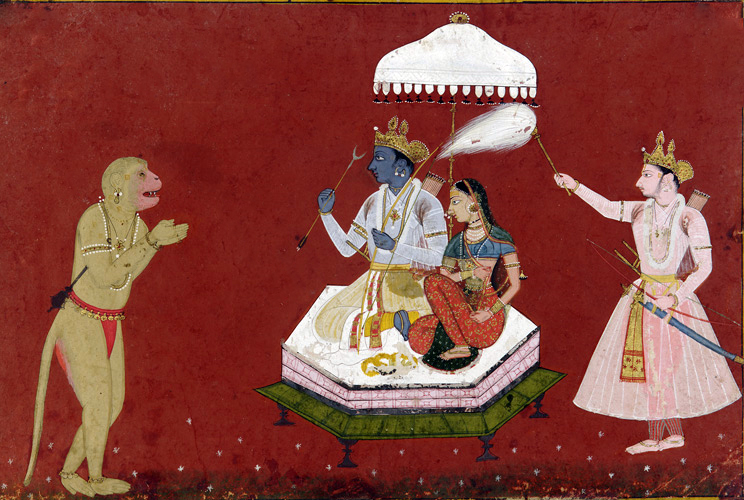
Rama seated with Sita, fanned by Lakshmana, while Hanuman pays his respects

In Hinduism, Sita is revered as a goddess. She has been portrayed as an ideal daughter, wife and mother in various texts, stories, illustrations, films and modern media. With the varied versions of the Ramayana, there are also varied depictions of Sita. Within the context of these Ramayanas, Sita is often worshipped with Rama as his consort. The occasion of her marriage to Rama is celebrated as Vivaha Panchami. The actions, reactions, and instincts manifested by Sita at every juncture in a long and arduous life are deemed exemplary. Her story has been portrayed in the book Sitayanam. The values that she enshrined and adhered to at every point in the course of a demanding life are the values of womanly virtue held sacred by countless generations of Indians.

Ananda W. P. Guruge opined that Sita was the central theme of the epic. He called her a dedicated wife and noted, "Sita's adamant wish to accompany Rāma to the forest despite the discomforts and dangers is another proof of the sincere affection the wife had for her husband." Sita has been considered as an equal partner to Rama. Known for her courage, she is often been cited as one of the defining figures of Indian womanhood. Throughout her life, Sita has taken crucial decisions such as accompanying Rama to exile or protecting her dignity in Ashoka Vatika.

Sita's character and life has significant influence on modern women. On this, Malashri Lal, the co-editor of In Search of Sita: Revisiting Mythology noted, "Modern-day women continue to see themselves reflected in films, serials, and soap operas based on Sita's narrative. She has been portrayed as a "folk heroine" in several Maithili songs and continue being a primary figure for women through folktales." Assessing Sita's personality, Anju P. Bhargava stated,

"Sita, conjures up an [image] of a chaste pati vrata [dutiful wife] woman, the ideal woman. Some see her as victimized and oppressed who obeyed her husband's commands, remained faithful to him, served her in-laws or yielded to parental authority. Yet, there are others who see a more liberated Sita, who was outspoken, had the freedom to express herself, said what she wanted to in order to get her way, spoke harsh words, repented for it, loved her husband, was faithful to him, served her family, did not get seduced by the glamour and material objects in Lanka, faced an angry husband, tried to appease him, reconciled her marriage, later accepted her separation, raised well balanced children as a single mother and then moved on."

A female deity of agricultural fertility by the name Sita was known before Valmiki's Ramayana, but was overshadowed by better-known goddesses associated with fertility. According to Ramayana, Sita was discovered in a furrow when Janaka was ploughing. Since Janaka was a king, it is likely that ploughing was part of a royal ritual to ensure fertility of the land. Sita is considered to be a child of Mother Earth, produced by union between the king and the land. Sita is a personification of Earth's fertility, abundance, and well-being.

== Temples ==
Although Sita's statue is always kept with Rama's statue in Rama temples, there are some temples dedicated to Sita:

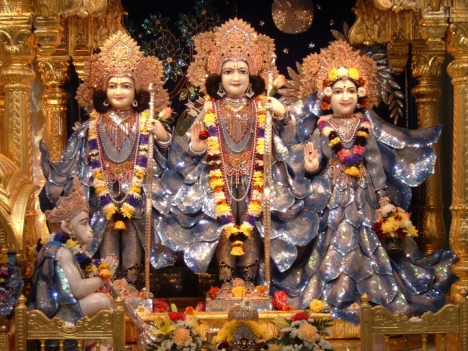
Idols of Sita (far right), Rama (center), Lakshmana (far left) and Hanuman (below, seated) at Bhaktivedanta Manor, Watford, England

- Janaki Mandir, located at Janakpur, Nepal.
- Janaki Janmasthali Mandir, Janaki Dham, situated in Sitamarhi district in Bihar, India.
- Sita Kund, Punaura Dham, situated in Sitamarhi district in Bihar, India.
- Panth Pakar in Sitamarhi district of Bihar.
- Prabhu Shree Sitaramji Pratham Milan Mandir at Baag Taraag Pushpavatika in Phulhar village in Bihar, India.
- Sita Kund at near Motihari town in the East Champaran district of Bihar.
- Sita Charan Mandir, Zaffar Nagar, India
- Seetha Devi Temple, Pulpally in the Wayanad district, Kerala, India.
- Seetha Amman Temple, near Nuwara Eliya, Sri Lanka. It is where Sita was held captive by Ravana in Sri Lanka.
- Ponkuzhi Sita Temple, Muthanga, Kerala.
- Sree Seetha Devi Lava-Kusha Temple, Irulam, Kerala.
- Sitabani Temple, situated in Jim Corbett National Park, Nainital district, Uttarakhand, India.
- Sita Temple, Phalswari, Pauri district, Uttarakhand, India (Proposed).
- Sita Mai Temple, situated in Sitamai village in the Karnal district of Haryana, India.
- Sita Samahit Sthal, situated in Bhadohi district in Uttar Pradesh, India.
- Sita Temple, situated in Yavatmal district in Maharashtra, India.
- Urvija Kund, situated in Sitamarhi district in Bihar, India.
- Sita Ki Rasoi, situated in Ayodhya district in Uttar Pradesh, India.
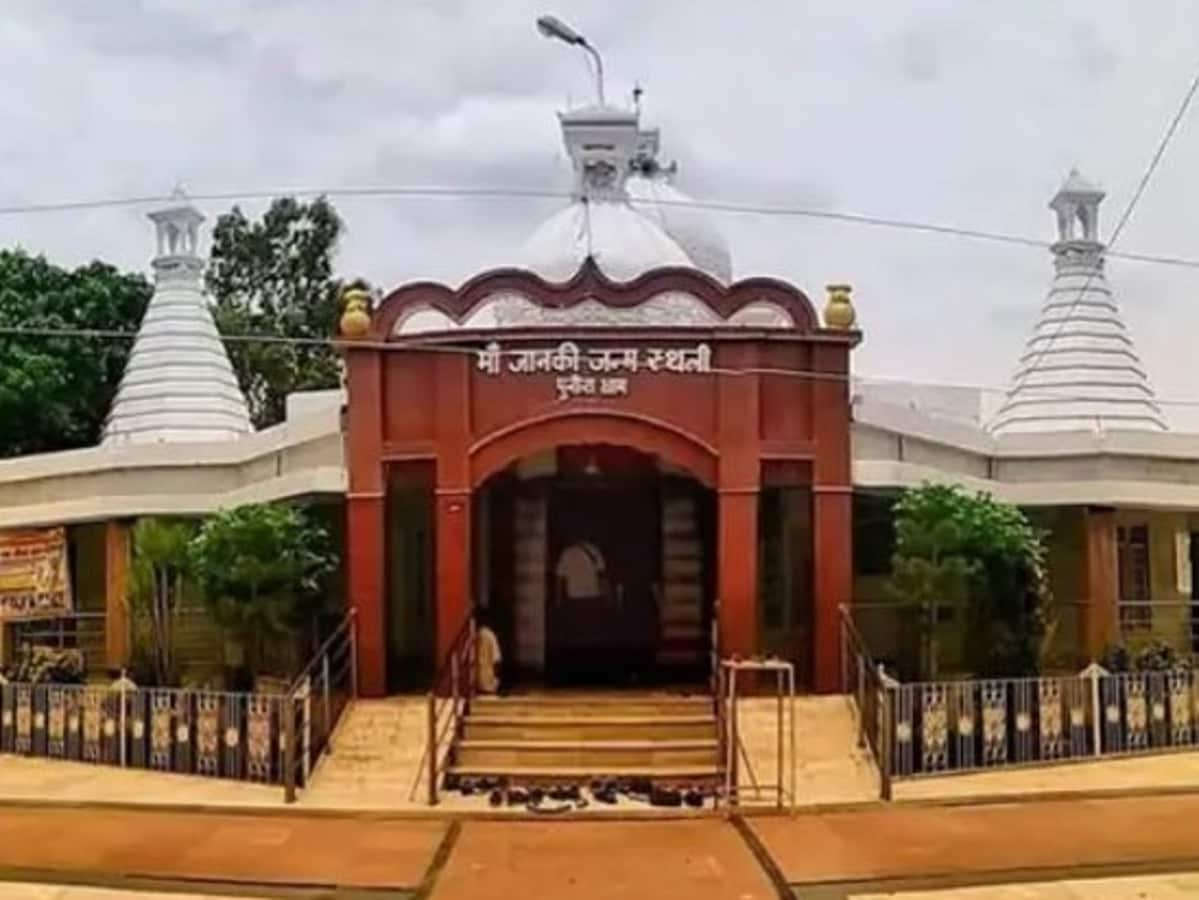
The ancient temple of Janaki Janmabhoomi at Punaura Dham in the Sitamarhi district, India.

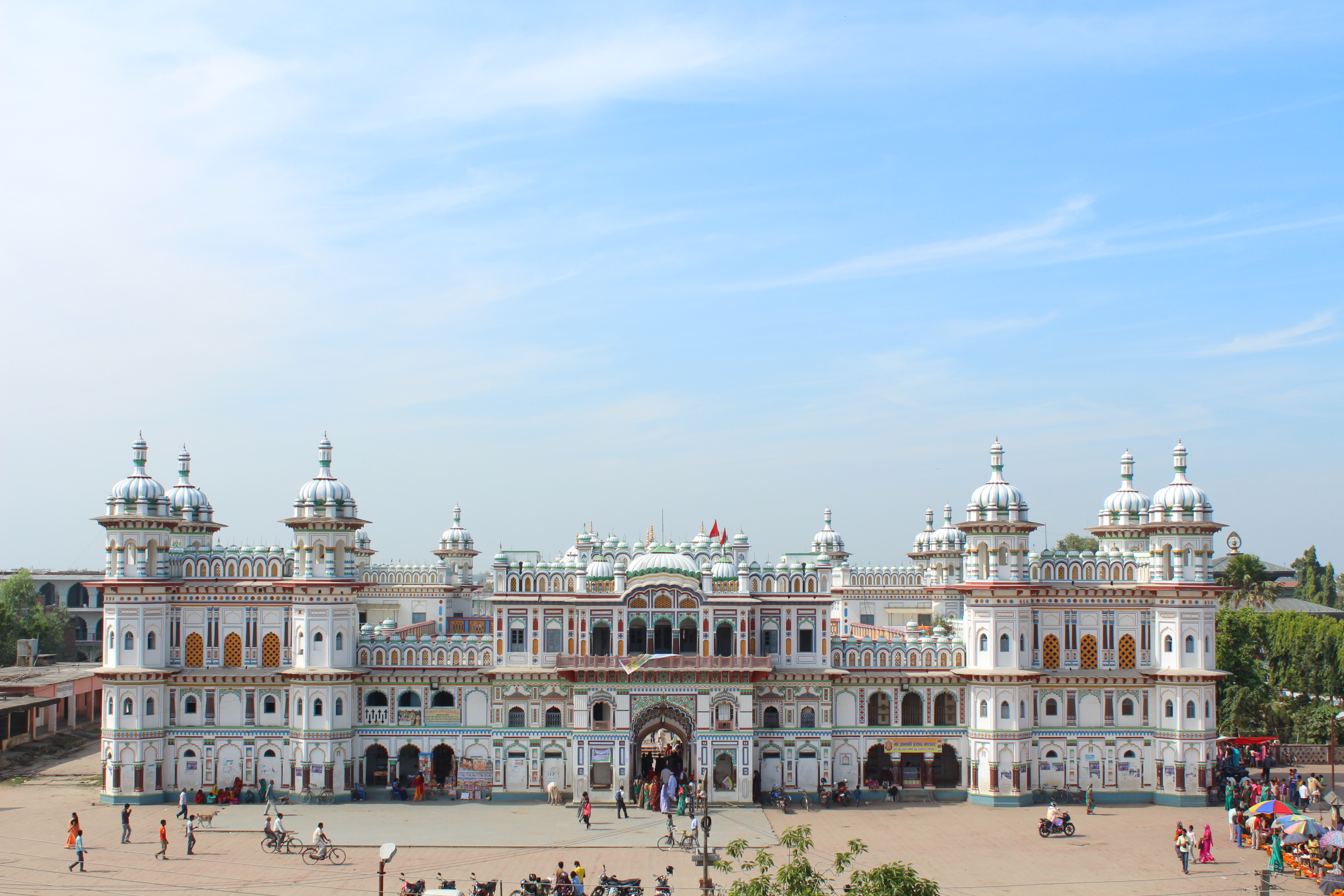
Janaki Mandir of Janakpur, Nepal is a center of pilgrimage where the wedding of Sri Rama and Sita took place and is re-enacted yearly as Vivaha Panchami.

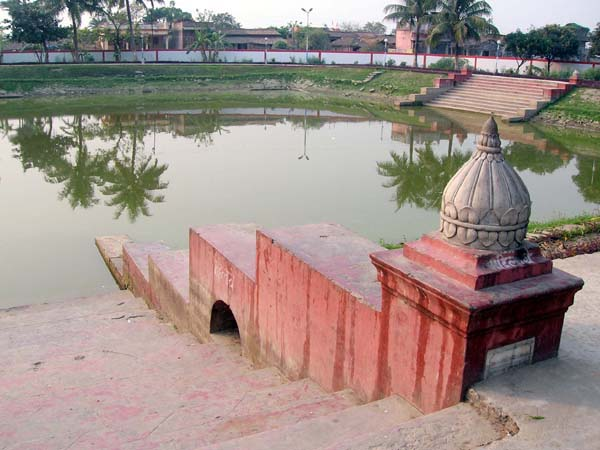
Janaki Kund at Sitamarhi, Bihar.

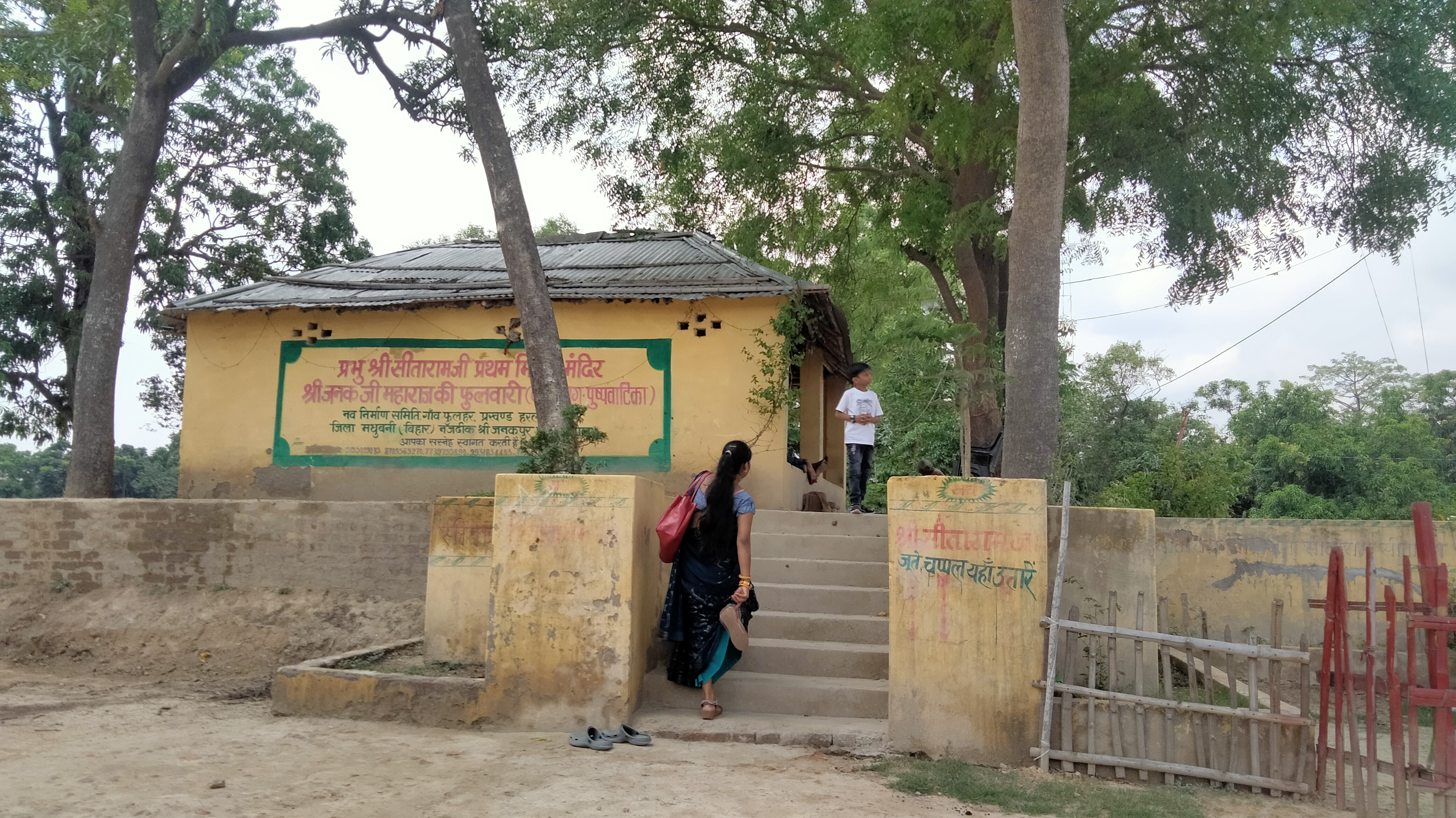
Prabhu Shree Sitaramji Pratham Milan Mandir, Phulhar, Bihar.

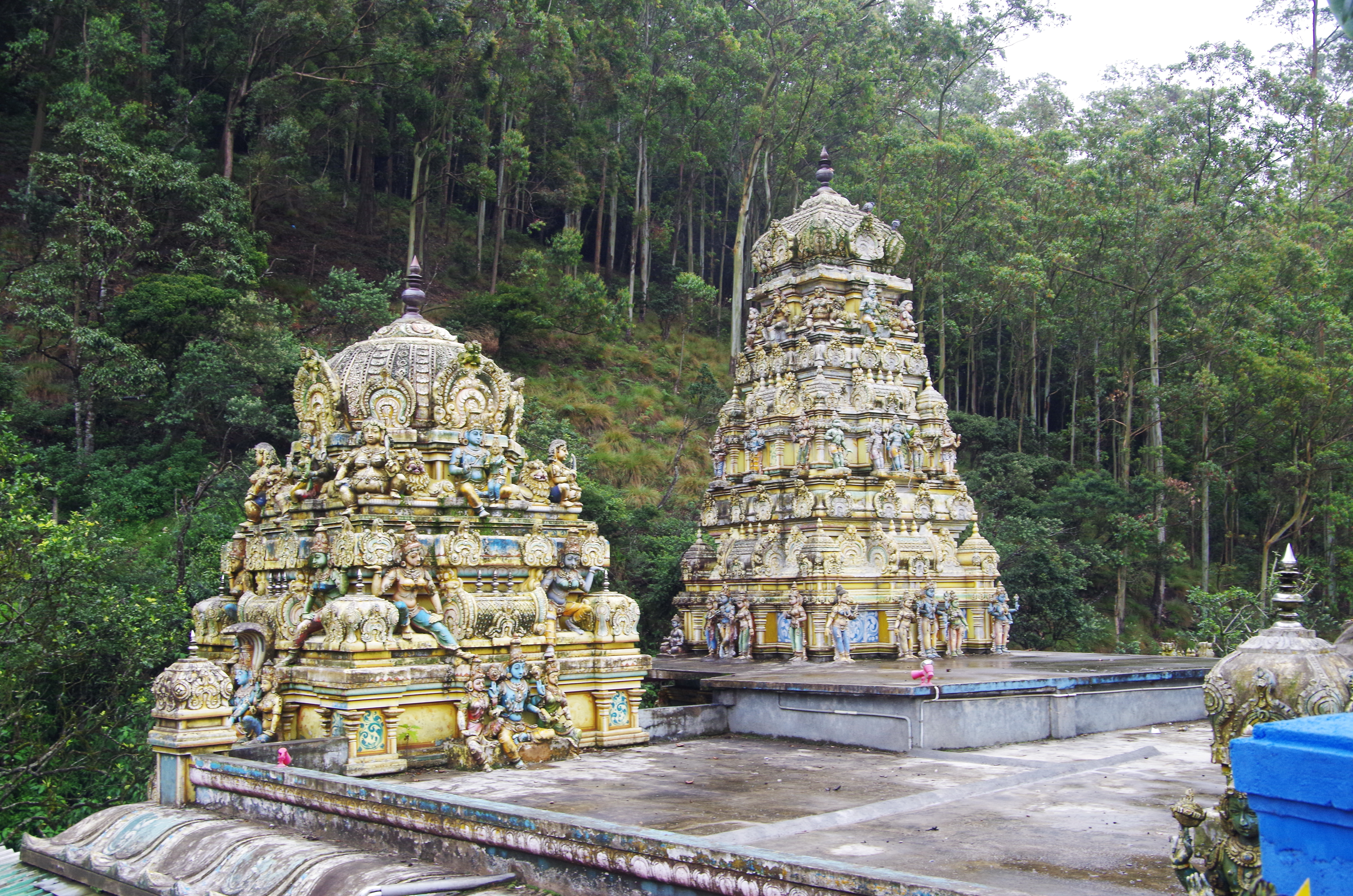
Seetha Amman Kovil, Nähe Nuwara Eliya, Sri Lanka.

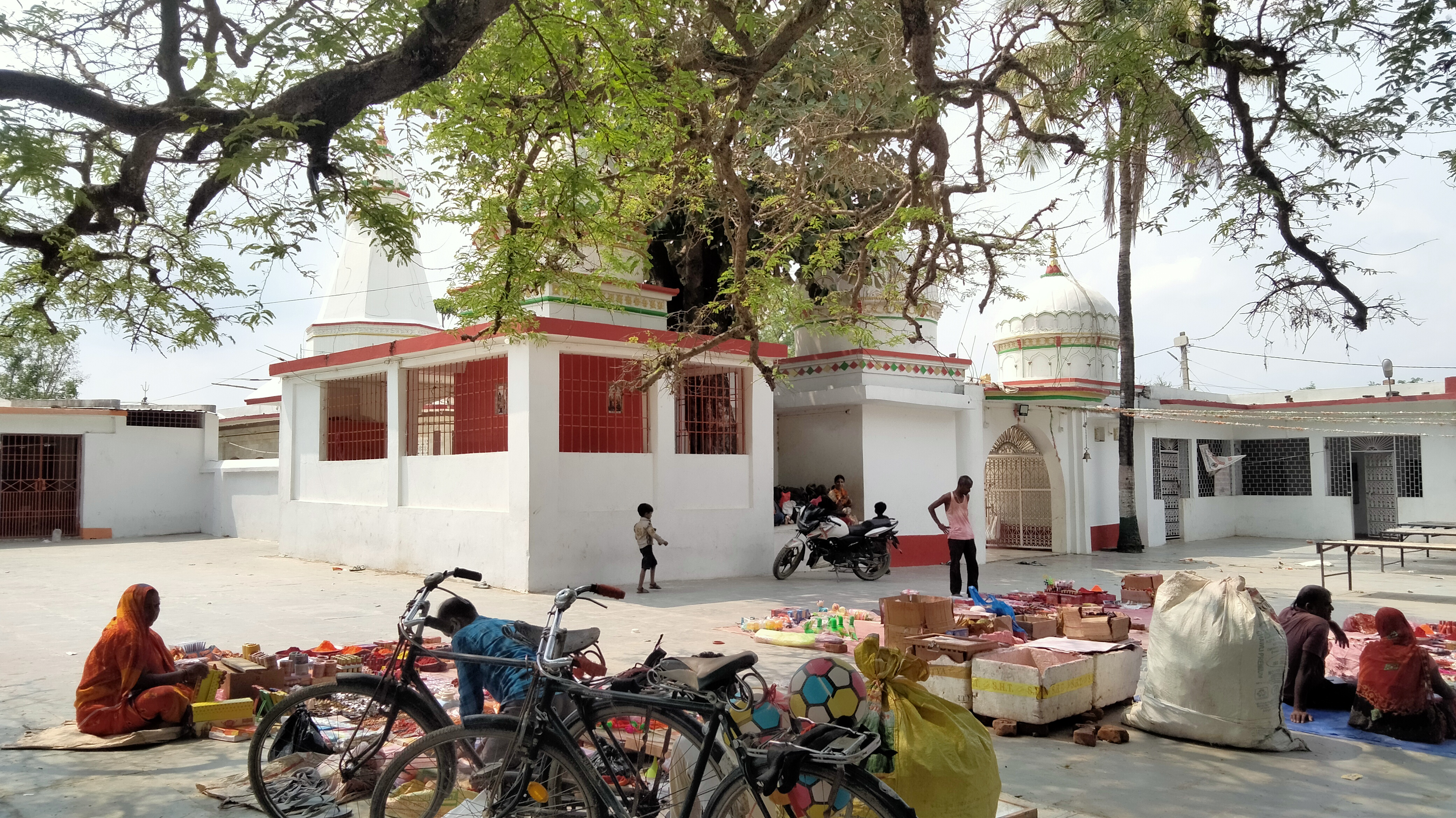
Phulhar Dham in the Mithila region, where princess Sita used to come for worshiping Goddess Girija Devi

== Worship and festivals ==
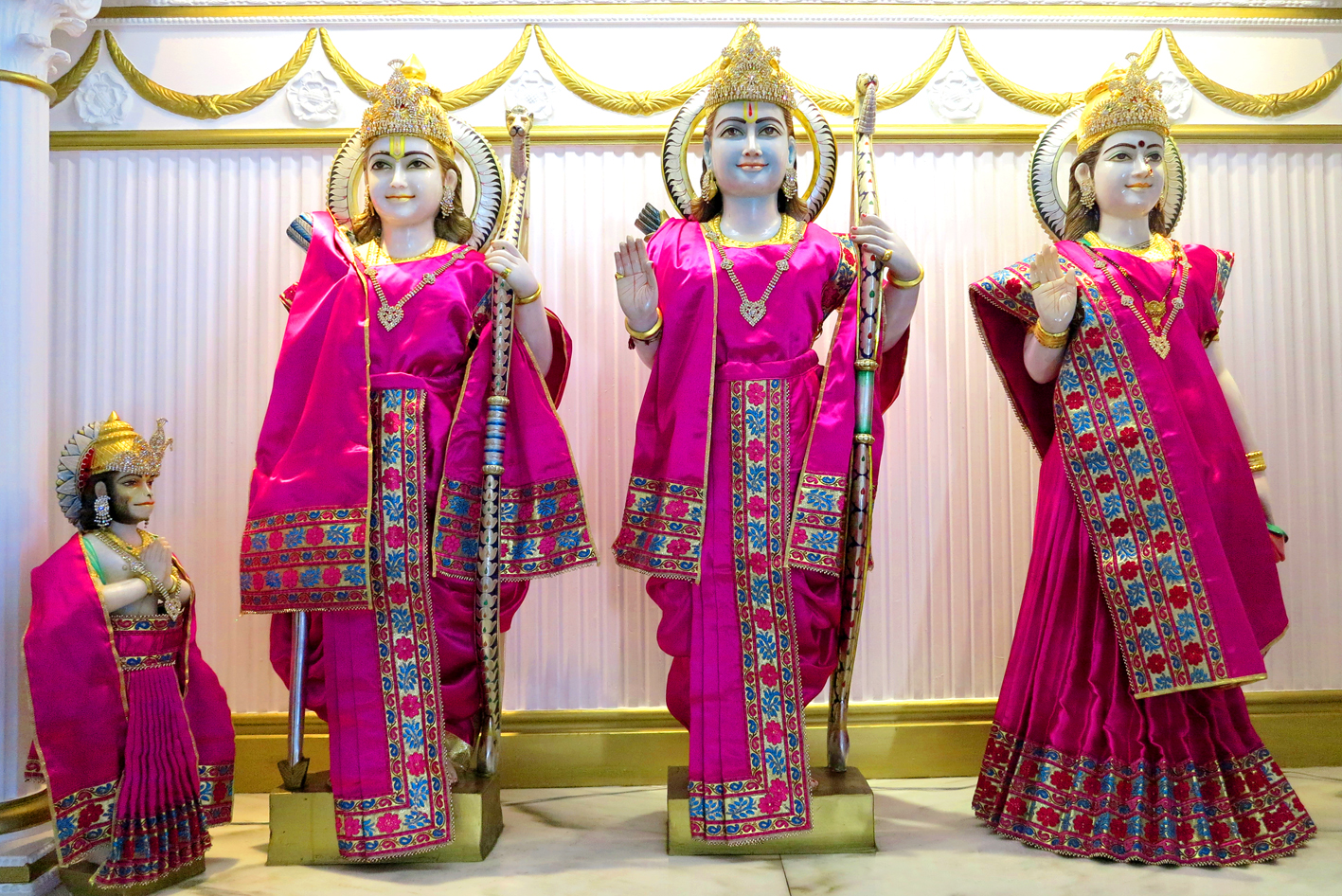
Rama, Sita, Lakshmana and Hanumana worship at Gibraltar Hindu Temple, Gibraltar

As part of the Bhakti movement, Rama and Sita became the focus of the Ramanandi Sampradaya, a sannyasi community founded by the 14th-century North-Indian poet-saint Ramananda. This community has grown to become the largest Hindu monastic community in modern times.

Sita is also the supreme goddess in the Niranjani Sampradaya, that primarily worships Rama and Sita.

Prajapati describes Sita as primal Prakriti, or primordial nature. She is, asserts the text, the same as Lakshmi and the Shakti (energy and power) of Vishnu. She represents the vocal form of the four Vedas, which the text asserts comes from 21 schools of Rigveda, 109 schools of Yajurveda, 1000 schools of Samaveda, and 40 schools of Atharvaveda. Sita is Lakshmi, seated as a Yogini on her lion throne, and she personifies three goddesses: Shri (goddess of prosperity, Lakshmi), Bhumi (mother earth), and Nila (goddess of destruction).

In the Ramcharitmanas, Tulsidas called Sita the regulator of the universe and added,

"I bow to Sita, the beloved consort of Sri Rama, who is responsible for the creation, sustenance, and dissolution (of the universe), removes afflictions and begets all blessings."
— Balkand, Manglacharan, Shloka 5

=== Hymns ===
List of prayers and hymns dedicated to Sita are:

- Jai Siya Ram – Greeting or Salutation in North India dedicated to Sita and Rama.
- Siyavar Ramchandraji Ki Jai – Greeting or Salutation dedicated to Sita and Rama. The hymns introduces Rama as Sita's husband.
- Sita-Ram-Sita-Ram – The maha-mantra is as follows:

सीता राम सीता राम सीता राम जय सीता राम। सीता राम सीता राम सीता राम जय सीता राम।।

- Hare Rama Rama Rama, Sita Rama Rama Rama.
- Sita Kavacha – The hymn dedicated to Sita, mentioned in the Manohar Kanda of Ananda Ramayana.
- Vinaya Patrika – The devotional poem has prayers dedicated to Sita.
- Janaki Mangal – This verse describes the episode of Sita and Rama's marriage and has hymns and prayers dedicated to them.

=== Festivals ===
==== Sita Navami ====
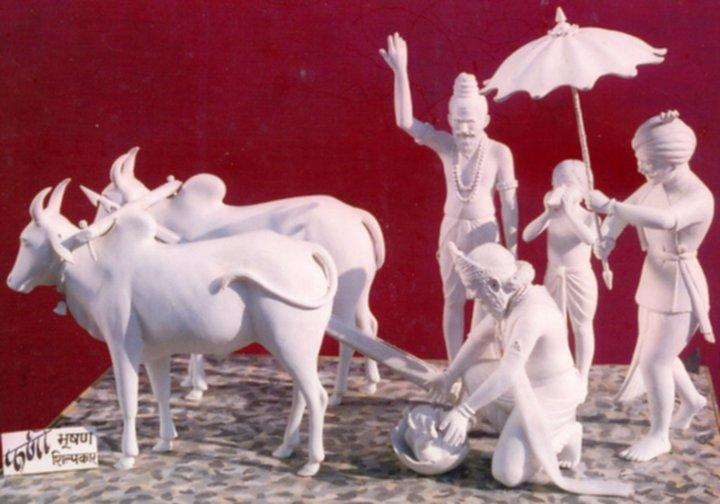
Image depicting the manifestation of Sita from the Earth

Sita Navami is a Hindu festival that celebrates the birth of the goddess Sita who is one of the most popular deities in Hinduism, and an incarnation of the goddess Lakshmi. It is celebrated on the navami (ninth day) of the Shukla Paksha (first lunar fortnight) of the Hindu month of Vaishakha. Sita is revered for her loyalty, devotion, and sacrifice to her husband. She is considered the epitome of womanhood and is regarded as the ideal wife and mother in the Indian subcontinent. It celebrates the anniversary date of the appearance or manifestation of Sita. On the occasion of Sita Navami, married women fast for their husbands's long life.

==== Vivaha Panchami ====
Vivaha Panchami is a Hindu festival celebrating the wedding of Rama and Sita in Janakpurdham which was the capital city of Mithila. It is observed on the fifth day of the Shukla paksha or waxing phase of moon in the Agrahayana month (November – December) as per the Bikram Samvat calendar and in the month of Mangsir. The day is observed as the Vivaha Utsava of Sita and Rama in temples and sacred places associated with Rama, such as the Mithila region of Bihar, India, Nepal and Ayodhya of India.

==== Ramlila and Dussehra ====
Rama and Sita's life is remembered and celebrated every year with dramatic plays and fireworks in autumn. This is called Ramlila, and the play follows the Ramayana or more commonly the Ramcharitmanas. It is observed through thousands of Rama-related performance arts and dance events, that are staged during the festival of Navratri in India. After the enactment of the legendary war between Good and Evil, the Ramlila celebrations climax in the Dussehra (Dasara, Vijayadashami) night festivities where the giant grotesque effigies of Evil such as of demon Ravana are burnt, typically with fireworks.

The Ramlila festivities were declared by UNESCO as one of the "Intangible Cultural Heritages of Humanity" in 2008. Ramlila is particularly notable in historically important Hindu cities of Ayodhya, Varanasi, Vrindavan, Almora, Satna and Madhubani – cities in Uttar Pradesh, Uttarakhand, Bihar and Madhya Pradesh. The epic and its dramatic play migrated into southeast Asia in the 1st millennium CE, and Ramayana based Ramlila is a part of performance arts culture of Indonesia, particularly the Hindu society of Bali, Myanmar, Cambodia and Thailand.

==== Diwali ====
In some parts of India, Rama and Sita's return to Ayodhya and their coronation is the main reason for celebrating Diwali, also known as the Festival of Lights.

==== Vasanthotsavam ====
Vasanthotsavam is an annual Seva celebrated in Tirumala to celebrate the arrival of spring season. Abhishekam – specifically called Snapana Thirumanjanam (Holy bathing), is performed to the utsava murthy and his consorts on all the three days. On the third day, abhishekam is performed to the idols of Rama, Sita, Lakshmana and Hanumana along with Krishna and Rukmini. Procession of the consecrated idols are taken in a procession in the evening on all the three days.

== Outside the Indian subcontinent ==
=== Indonesia ===
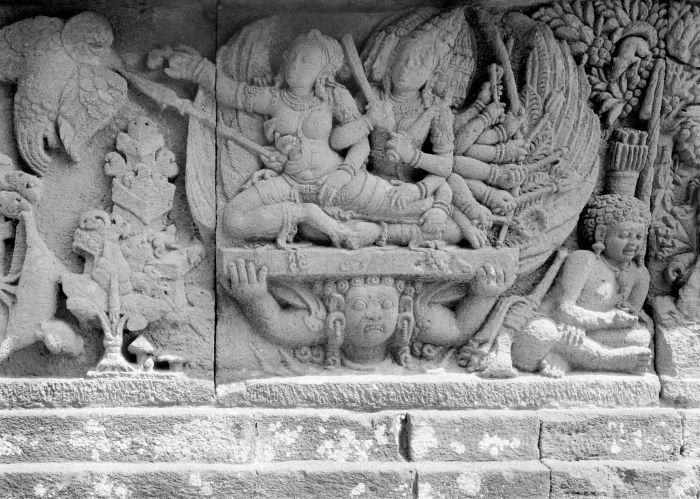
Ravana kidnapping Sita riding winged giant, while the Jatayu on the left tried to help her. 9th century Prambanan bas-relief at the temple dedicated to Shiva at Prambanan temple complex, Java, Indonesia

In the Indonesian version, especially in Javanese wayang stories. Sita in Indonesia is called Rakyan Wara Sinta or Shinta. Uniquely, she is also referred to as Ravana's own biological daughter, the Javanese version of Ravana is told that he fell in love with a female priest named Widawati. However, Widawati rejected his love and chose to commit suicide. Ravana was determined to find and marry the reincarnation of Widawati.

On the instructions of his teacher, Resi Maruta, Rahwana learns that Widawati will incarnate as his own daughter. But when his wife named Dewi Kanung gave birth, Ravana went to expand the colony. Wibisana took the baby girl who was born by Kanung to be dumped in the river in a crate. Wibisana then exchanged the baby with a baby boy she had created from the sky. The baby boy was finally recognized by Ravana as his son, and later became known as Indrajit. Meanwhile, the baby girl who was dumped by Wibisana was carried by the river to the territory of the Mantili Kingdom. The king of the country named Janaka took and made her an adopted daughter, with the name Shinta.

The next story is not much different from the original version, namely the marriage of Shinta to Sri Rama, her kidnapping, and the death of Ravana in the great war. However, the Javanese version says, after the war ended, Rama did not become king in Ayodhya, but instead built a new kingdom called Pancawati. From her marriage to Rama, Sinta gave birth to two sons named Ramabatlawa and Ramakusiya. The first son, namely Ramabatlawa, brought down the kings of the Mandura Kingdom, including Basudeva, and also his son, Krishna.

The Javanese version of Krishna is referred to as the reincarnation of Rama, while his younger brother, Subhadra, is referred to as the reincarnation of Shinta. Thus, the relationship between Rama and Shinta, who in the previous life was husband and wife, turned into brother and sister in the next life.

==== Wayang story ====
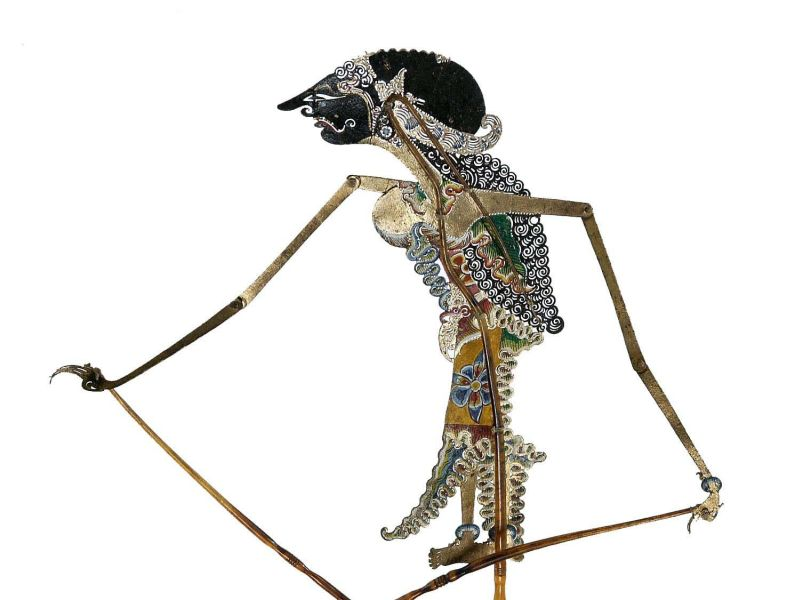
Shinta wayang (puppetry) figures

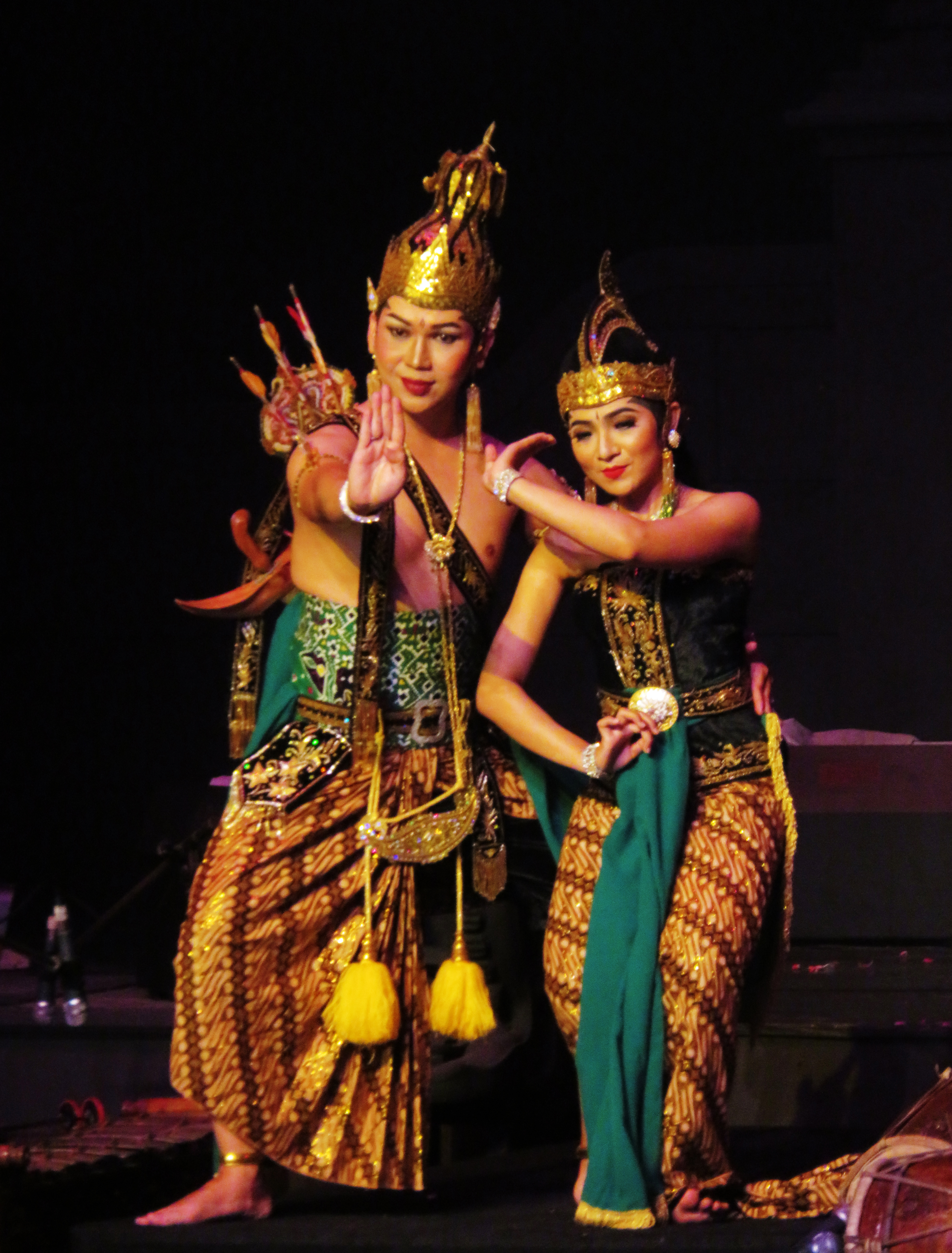
Rama and Shinta in Wayang Wong performance near temple in Indonesia

Shinta is the daughter of an angel named Batari Tari or Kanun, the wife of Ravana. Shinta is believed to be the incarnation of Btari Widawati, the wife of Lord Vishnu. In the seventh month, Kanun who was "mitoni" her pregnancy, suddenly caused a stir in the Alengka palace, because the baby he was carrying was predicted by several priests who were at the party that he would become Rahwana's "wife" (his own father). Ravana was furious. He rose from his throne and wanted to behead Kanun. But before that took place, Ravana suddenly abandoned his intention because he thought his child would be beautiful. Thus, she too will be willing to marry him. Sure enough, when Ravana was on an overseas service, his empress gave birth to a baby girl with a very beautiful face glowing like the full moon. Wibisana (Ravana's sister) who is holy and full of humanity, immediately took the baby and put it in Sinta's diamond, then anchored it into the river. Only God can help him, that's what Wibisana thought. He immediately made the black mega cloud into a baby boy who would later be named Megananda or Indrajit.

Syahdan a hermit named Prabu Janaka from the land of Mantili, begged the gods to be blessed with offspring. So surprised when he opened his eyes, he heard the cry of a baby in a sinking ketupat floating in the river. The baby was taken with pleasure and brought home adopted as his son. Because the baby is known to be in the diamond Sinta, then he was given the name Sinta. After being 17 years old, Sinta made a commotion all the youth, both domestic and foreign cadets because of her beauty.

One day, a contest was held. Anyone who can draw the giant bow of Mantili's national heritage will become Sinta's mate. Ramawijaya, who was studying at the Brahmin Yogiswara, was advised to take part in the contest. Of course, Rama was successful, because he was the incarnation of Vishnu. Engagements and marriages are all enlivened with debauchery, both in the country of Mantili and in Ayodya. But luck was not good for both of them, while enjoying their honeymoon, suddenly the crown belonged to Kekayi, Rama's stepmother.

Dasarata Mr. Rama was ordered to hand over the crown to Bharata (Rama's younger brother). In addition, Rama, Sinta and Laksmana had to leave the palace into the wilderness for 13 years. In exile in the jungle, Sinta is unable to contain her desire to control the tempting Kijang Kencana, which someone who is concerned should not have. What was sparkling, at first he thought would make him happy, but on the contrary. Not only can Kijang Kencana be caught, but moreover he is captured and held captive by his own lust, which is manifested in the form of Ravana. Briefly he was diruda paripaksa, put in a gold cage in Alengka for about 12 years.

One time, Raden Ramawijaya was defeated by Raden Ramawijaya, until Dewi Shinta was freed from Ravana's shackles. However, Shinta's suffering did not end there. After being released, she was still suspected of her chastity by her own husband Ramawijaya. So, to show that as long as in the reign of the King of Alengka, Sinta has not been stained, Shinta proves herself by plunging into the fire. Shinta was saved from the raging fire by the gods of heaven.

=== Cambodia ===
Sita is referred to as Neang Seda in the Cambodian version Reamker. While the story is similar to the original epic, there are two difference. Firstly, Rama married Sita, by completing the challenge of firing arrows through a spinning wheel with spokes. Later, Neang Seda (Sita) leave for the forest immediately after passing the test, as she is deeply offended by her husband's lack of trust in her and his lack of belief in her word.

=== In other countries ===
Sita is referred to as the following, in different versions of Ramayana:

- Nang Sida, who embodies purity and fidelity – Ramakien, Thailand.
- Towan Potri Malano Tihaya, or Potri Malayla Ganding, the princess of Polo Nabanday – Maharadia Lawana, Philippines.
- Siti Dewi, adoptive daughter of Maharisi Kali – Hikayat Seri Rama, Malaysia.
- Nang Sida, incarnation of Nang Souxada – Phra Lak Phra Ram, Laos.

== Influence and depiction ==
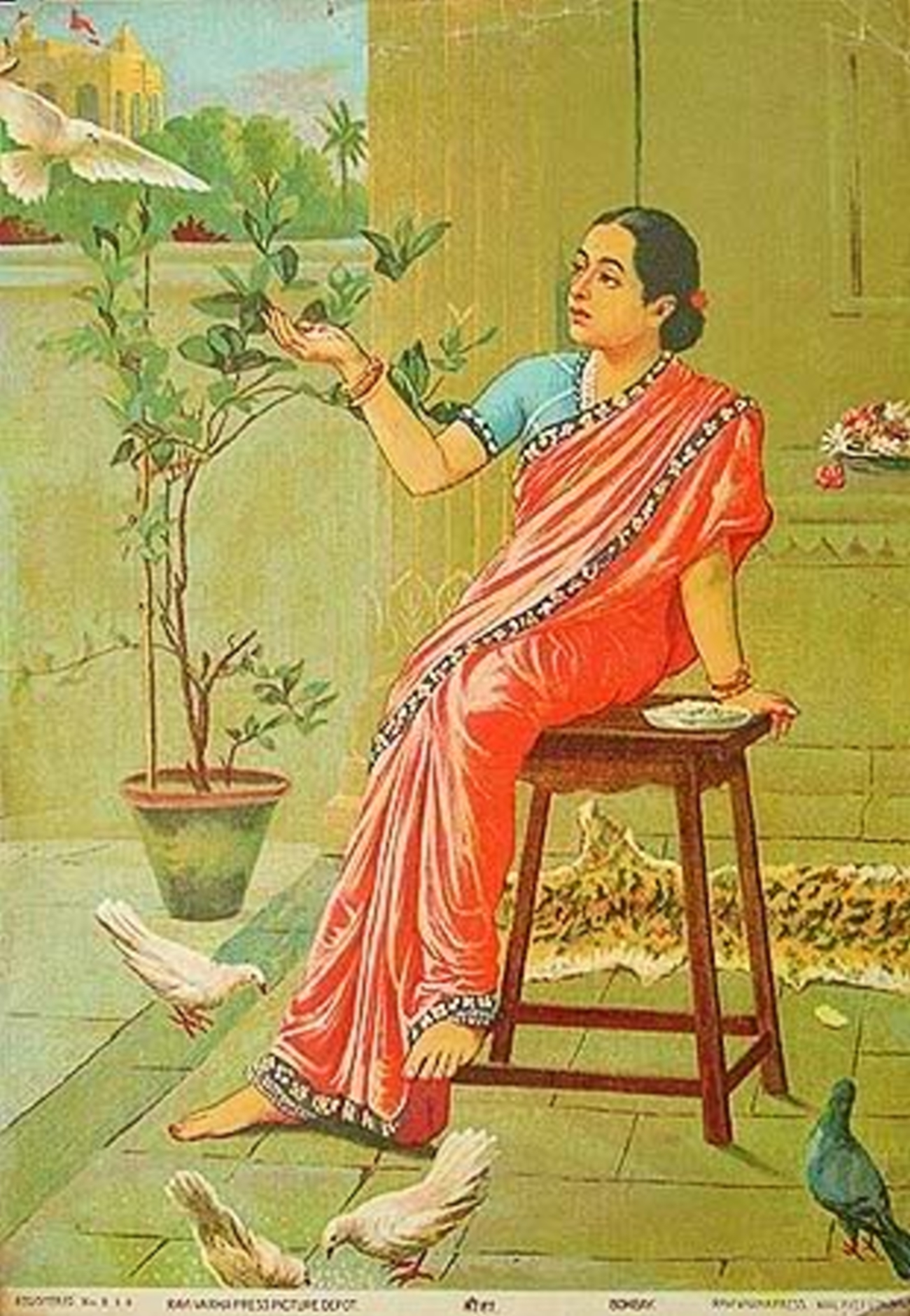
Sita as depicted in a painting by Raja Ravi Varma

=== Paintings ===
Rama and Sita have inspired many forms of performance arts and literary works. Madhubani paintings is the charismatic art of Bihar, and is mostly based on religion and mythology. In the paintings, Hindu gods like Sita-Rama are in the center and their marriage ceremony is a primary theme. Sita's abduction and her days in Lanka have also been depicted in Rajput paintings.

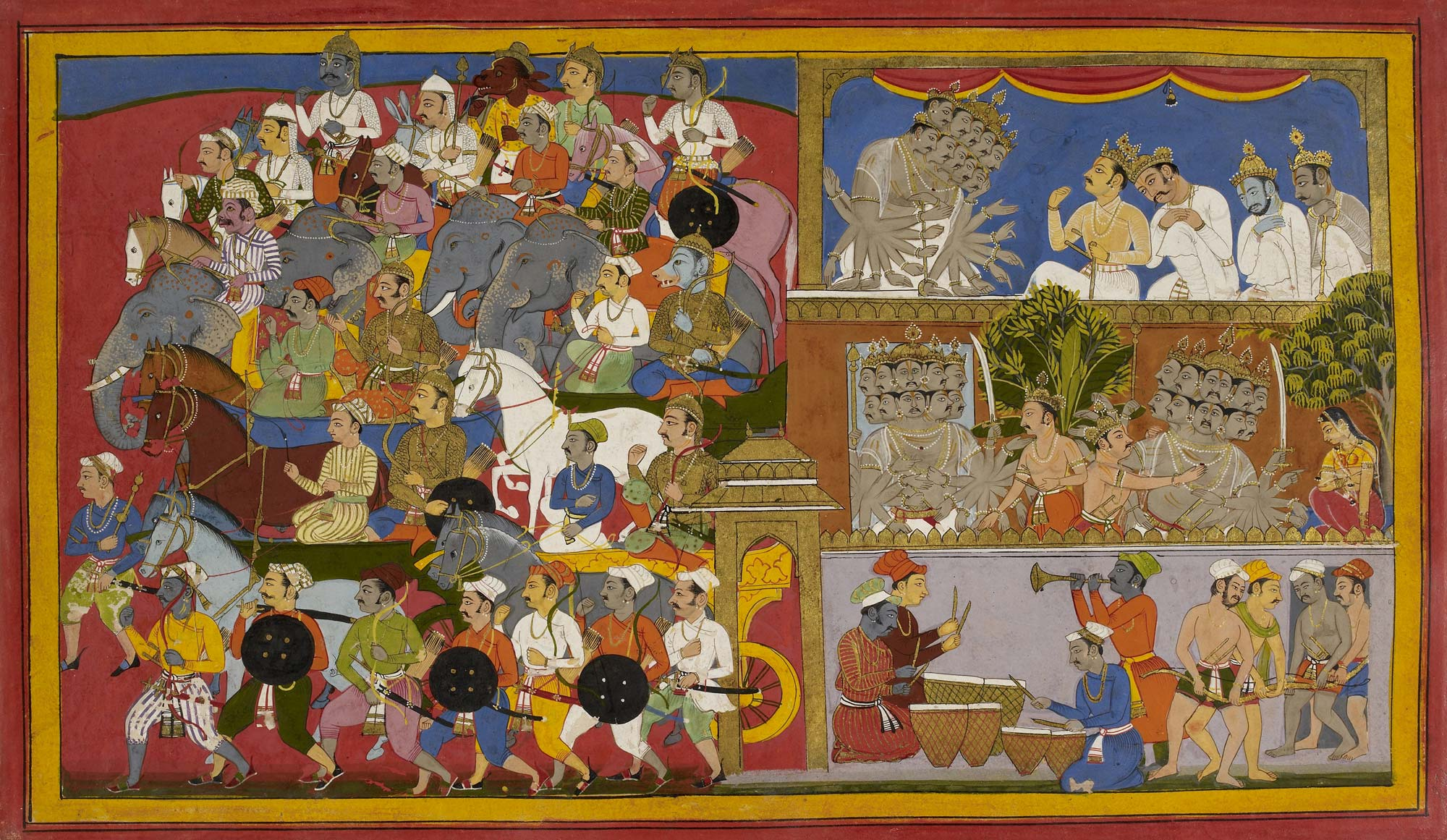
Ravana, overwhelmed by grief on hearing of his son's death, sends out more forces against Rama by Sahibdin, Folio from the Mewar Ramayana. Arranged in old horizontal pothī format, a full-page picture on one side of folio and accompanying text on the reverse, this painting follow Indian tradition of illustration of several connected incidents from a story in the same picture in continuous narration. Here we first see Ravana overwhelmed by grief on hearing of his last remaining son's death. Then furious with rage, he rushes with his upraised sword at Sita, who calmly awaits her fate seated in her grove, but he is restrained by his minister Suparsva. In order to intimidate Rama for his own going forth on the morrow, he decides to send out his army yet again to the accompaniment of war-drums and trumpets being beaten and blown, while his own bow is made ready. Mewar, 1652. British Library.

=== Music ===
Sita is a primary figure in Maithili music of the Mithila region. The folk music genre Lagan mentions about the problems faced by Rama and Sita during their marriage.

=== Dance and art forms ===
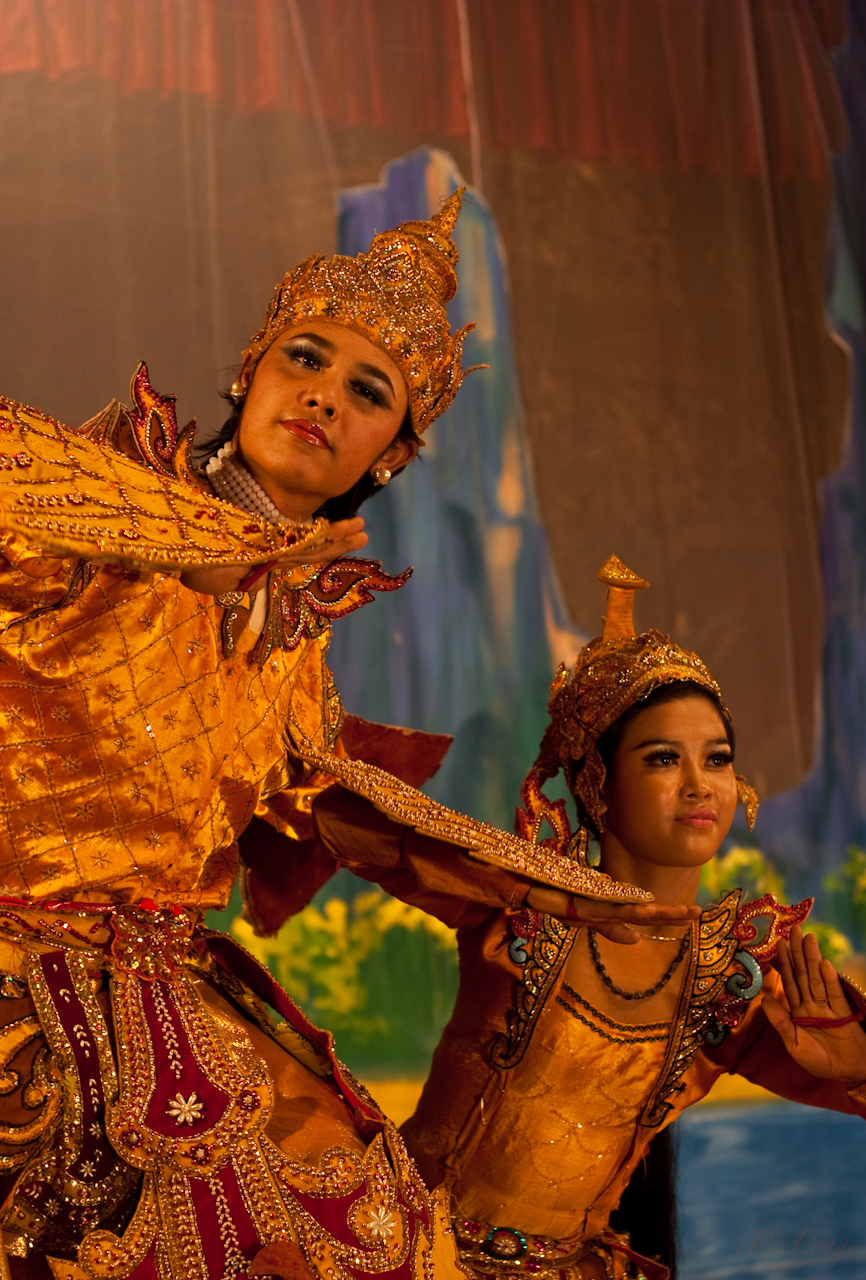
Rama (Yama) and Sita (Thida) in Yama Zatdaw, the Burmese version of the Ramayana

The Ramayana became popular in Southeast Asia from the 8th century onward and was represented in literature, temple architecture, dance and theatre. Dramatic enactments of the story of the Ramayana, known as Ramlila, take place all across India and in many places across the globe within the Indian diaspora.

In Indonesia, especially Java and Bali, Ramayana has become a popular source of artistic expression for dance drama and shadow puppet performances in the region. Sendratari Ramayana is the Javanese traditional ballet in wayang orang style, routinely performed in the cultural center of Yogyakarta. In Balinese Hindu temples in Ubud and Uluwatu, where scenes from Ramayana are an integral part of kecak dance performances.

=== Salutations ===
In the North Indian region, mainly in Uttar Pradesh and Bihar, people use salutations such as Jai Shri Ram, Jai Siya Ram and Siyavar Ramchandraji Ki Jai. Photojournalist Prashant Panjiar wrote about how in the city Ayodhya female pilgrims always chant "Sita-Ram-Sita-Ram". Ramanandi ascetics (called Bairagis) often use chants like "Jaya Sita Ram" and "Sita Ram". The chants of Jai Siya Ram is also common at religious places and gatherings, for example, the Kumbh Mela. It is often used during the recital of Ramayana, Ramcharitmanas, especially the Sundara Kanda. Writer Amish Tripathi opines that "Shri" in Jai Shri Ram means Sita. He added,

We say Jai Shri Ram or Jai Siya Ram. Lord Ram and Goddess Sita are inseparable. When we worship Lord Ram, we worship Sita as well. We learn from Lord Ram, we learn from Goddess Sita as well. Traditionally, when you say Jai Shri Ram, Shri means Sita. Sita is the avatar of Goddess Laxmi and referred to as Shri. So, that's the way to see it. It's an equal partnership."

=== In popular culture ===
Sita's story and sacrifice have inspired "painting, film, novels, poems, TV serials and plays". Prominently, she is depicted in all the adaptations of Ramayana.

Sita: Daughter of the Earth by Saraswati Nagpal and Sita's Ramayana by Samhita Arni and Moyna Chitrakar are two contemporary graphic narratives with contrasting portrayals of Sita. In the former, Sita is portrayed as a divine goddess who asserts her agency to act on her duties as she understands them. In the former, Sita is portrayed as a divine goddess who asserts her agency to act on her duties as she understands them. In the Arni and Chitrakar portrayal, Sita is a mortal woman who is both an active critique of and victim of patriarchal violence which the Ramayana is characterized as.

==== Films ====
The following people portrayed Sita in the film adaptation of Ramayana.

- Durga Khote portrayed her in the 1934 Bengali film Seeta.
- Shobhna Samarth portrayed her in the 1943 Hindi film Ram Rajya.
- Padmini portrayed her in the 1958 Tamil film Sampoorna Ramayanam.
- Kusalakumari portrayed her in the 1960 Malayalam film Seeta.
- Geetanjali portrayed her in the 1961 Telugu film Sita Rama Kalyanam.
- Anjali Devi portrayed her in the 1968 Telugu film Veeranjaneya.
- Chandrakala portrayed her in the 1972 Telugu film Sampoorna Ramayanam.
- B. Saroja Devi portrayed her in the 1975 Telugu film Sri Ramanjaneya Yuddham.
- Jaya Prada portrayed her in the 1976 Telugu film Sita Kalyanam, the 1977 Telugu film Seetha Rama Vanavasam, and the 1997 Hindi film Lav Kush.
- Sridevi portrayed her in the 1976 Tamil film Dasavatharam.
- Sangeeta portrayed her in the 1978 Telugu film Sri Rama Pattabhishekam.
- Smitha Madhav portrayed her in the 1997 Telugu film Ramayanam.
- Rael Padmasee and Namrata Sawhney voiced her in the 1992 animated film Ramayana: The Legend of Prince Rama.
- Juhi Chawla voiced her in the 2010 animated Hindi film Ramayana: The Epic.
- Nayanthara portrayed her in the 2011 Telugu film Sri Rama Rajyam.
- Mouni Roy voiced her in the 2016 Hindi animated film Mahayoddha Rama.
- Kriti Sanon portrayed her in the 2023 Hindi film Adipurush.
- Anjali Arora portrayed her in the 2026 Hindi film Mahakavya Shri Ramayan Katha.
- Sai Pallavi portrayed her in the Hindi two-part film Ramayana: Part 1 (2026) and Ramayana: Part 2 (2028).

==== Television ====
The following people portrayed Sita in the television adaptation of Ramayana.

- Dipika Chikhlia portrayed her in the 1987 series Ramayan and the 1998 series Luv Kush.
- Shilpa Mukherjee / Meenakshi Gupta portrayed her in the 1997 series Jai Hanuman.
- Reena Kapoor portrayed her in the 2000 series Vishnu Puran.
- Smriti Irani portrayed her in the 2002 series Ramayan.
- Debina Bonnerjee portrayed her in the 2008 series Ramayan.
- Reena Shah voiced her in the 2008 America animated series Sita Sings the Blues. Annette Hanshaw sang for her in the series songs.
- Rubina Dilaik portrayed her in the 2011 series Devon Ke Dev...Mahadev.
- Neha Sargam portrayed her in the 2012 series Ramayan.
- Richa Pallod portrayed her in the 2012 mini-series Ramleela – Ajay Devgn Ke Saath. Madhushree voiced for her in the song, "Jaao Na Morey Piya".
- Deblina Chatterjee portrayed her in the 2015 series Sankat Mochan Mahabali Hanumaan.
- Madirakshi Mundle portrayed her in the 2015 series Siya Ke Ram and the 2022 series Jai Hanuman – Sankatmochan Naam Tiharo.
- Shivya Pathania portrayed her in the 2019 series Ram Siya Ke Luv Kush.
- Aishwarya Ojha portrayed her in the 2021 web series Ramyug.
- Prachi Bansal portrayed her in the 2024 series Shrimad Ramayan.
- Vaibhavi Kapoor portrayed her in the 2024 series Kakabhushundi Ramayan- Anasuni Kathayein.

==== Plays ====
The following plays portrayed Sita's life in the theatre adaptation of Ramayana.

- Sita is the central character in the 1955 play, Bhoomikanya Sita, written by Bhargavaram Viththal Varerkar.
- Her life struggles were also portrayed in the "Sita-Rama episode" of the 2023 play, Prem Ramayan.

==== Books ====
The following novels talks about Sita's life.

- In Search of Sita: Revisiting Mythology by Namita Gokhale, published in 2009.
- Sita's Ramayana by Samhita Arni and Moyna Chitrakar, published in 2011.
- Sita – An Illustrated Retelling of the Ramayana by Devdutt Pattanaik, published in 2013.
- Bhumika: A Story of Sita by Aditya Iyengar, published in 2019.
- The Forest of Enchantments by Chitra Banerjee Divakaruni, published in 2019.
- Sita: A Tale of Ancient Love by Bhanumathi Narasimhan, published in 2021.
- Sita: Warrior of Mithila by Amish Tripathi, published in 2022.

==== Others ====
- Shri Ram Janki Medical College and Hospital in Samastipur, Bihar.

== See also ==
- Sita Upanishad – Minor Upanishad
- Rama, Hindu deity and husband of Sita
- Ramayan, ancient Sanskrit source text of Sita mythology
- Thabaton – Lady in Meitei folklore
- Vivah Panchami – Hindu festival
- Maithili Mahopanishad – Sanskrit Upanishad
- Sitamarhi Dham Parikrama – Hindu religious circumambulation of Sitamarhi Dham in Mithila
- Ancient statue of Shree Sita at Pushpavatika, Phulhar
