= Nirguna Bhakti =

Nirguna Bhakti is a religious-sectarian trend in the Indian devotional tradition, in which the Supreme Power is worshipped without considering it as limited by a specific form, idol or material qualities. This trend developed particularly in the medieval North Indian saintly tradition. Thoughts related to Nirguna Bhakti are found in the poetry of Kabir, Ravidas, Dadu Dayal, Guru Nanak and other saints. This tradition gives importance to topics such as God-realization, Naamsmaran, Satguru, Self-knowledge and liberation from worldly attachments.

The nature of Nirguna Bhakti is not the same in all saintly traditions, but there are different views on its concept, religious practice, and the nature of the Supreme Power in different traditions. Kabir's speech emphasizes inward devotion and the realization of the Supreme Truth, criticizing external rituals, caste distinctions, and religious customs.

Although Nirguna Bhakti is primarily associated with North Indian saintly literature, its philosophical background is linked to various concepts of Nirguna Brahman, devotion, and salvation in Indian philosophy. In modern times, various saintly traditions and religious thinkers have given their own interpretations of Nirguna Bhakti. Among them, the teachings of Saint Rampal provide a specific explanation of Nirguna Bhakti based on the words of Kabir and various religious scriptures.

== Etymology ==
The word Nirguna Bhakti is derived from the Sanskrit words 'Nirguna' and 'Bhakti'. 'Nirguna' is a compound word of the words nir (without) and guna (qualities, attributes or qualities) and its general meaning is 'without qualities' or 'not limited by specific qualities'. In Indian philosophy, the meaning of the word varies depending on the context.

The word 'bhakti' is derived from the Sanskrit root bhaj and is associated with devotion, worship and dedication to God. Therefore, 'nirguna bhakti' is generally understood to mean devotion to the Supreme Being who is not limited by specific physical form or material qualities.

Although the concept of 'Nirguna' in Nirguna Bhakti and the concept of 'Nirguna Brahman' in Vedanta are related, the meaning of both is not the same in all religious and philosophical traditions. Therefore, it is necessary to consider the relevant saintly tradition and literary context when understanding the nature of Nirguna Bhakti.

== Prominent saints and poets ==
The major saints associated with Nirguna Bhakti in the North Indian saintly tradition include Kabir, Guru Nanak, Raidas, and Dadu Dayal. The writings of these saints feature themes such as the formless or Nirguna Supreme Being, the chanting of the name of the Lord, devotion, spiritual realization, and liberation from worldly attachments. David N. Lorenzen has studied the writings of these saints in the context of the broader literary tradition of Nirguna Bhakti.

=== Kabir ===
Kabir is one of the major saint-poets of North India, and his works are given an important place in the Nirguna tradition of saints. His poetry mentions the Supreme Being, Name, Self-knowledge and devotion that are not limited to a specific form or image. Kabir also criticized religious rituals, caste discrimination and external pomp. His works have been transmitted through various oral and written traditions, and works under his name can be found in collections such as Bijak, Kabir Granthavali and Adi Granth.

Kabir's works incorporate Hindu and Islamic religious terms as well as concepts from local saintly traditions. A large part of his poetry is in the form of sakhis, shabdas, and padas. Modern scholars have distinguished between historical and literary layers in the available narratives about Kabir's life and the literature circulated in his name.

=== Guru Nanak ===
Guru Nanak (1469–1539) was the founder of Sikhism and a major poet in the North Indian saintly tradition. His works emphasize monotheism, chanting of the name of the Lord, devotion, moral living, and social equality. Many of his works were later included in the Guru Granth Sahib. In the study of Nirguna Bhakti, Guru Nanak's works are considered along with those of Kabir, Ravidas, and Dadu Dayal.

Guru Nanak's thoughts have their own unique Sikh religious and philosophical contexts. Therefore, rather than being placed solely within the framework of Kabirism or other saintly traditions, they are studied in relation to the concept of Nirguna in his writings and the independent development of Sikhism.

=== Ravidas ===
Raidas (Ravidas) was a North Indian saint-poet whose works are considered to be of great importance in the tradition of Nirguna Sant literature. His poetry deals with themes such as devotion to God, name, social equality and spiritual liberation. Some of the works known under his name are also included in the Guru Granth Sahib.

Ravidas's literature is studied in relation to his social background and the views on the caste system of the time. In his poetry, devotion and connection with God are given importance over external social prestige. Modern scholars have also studied the background of the literature available under Ravidas' name.

=== Dadu Dayal ===
Dadu Dayal (1544–1603) was a prominent saint-poet of Rajasthan and the founder of the Dadu Panth. His works cover themes such as the Nirgun Paramasatta, Namasmaran, Guru, Bhakti, and criticism of religious ostentation. The tradition based on his teachings later came to be known as Dadu Panth.

Dadu's works were compiled by his followers, and various padas, sakhyas, and other works were circulated in his name. The literary tradition of Dadu Panth included the works of other saints along with Dadu's own words. Therefore, Dadu's literature is studied in the context of his personal works as well as the further development of Dadu Panth.

=== Dharamdas ===
Dharamdas is a prominent saint associated with the Kabir sect, and many titles and sayings are popular in his name. Dharmadas holds a special place in the Dharmadasi tradition of the Kabir sect. The legends related to him describe his meeting with Kabir, initiation, and subsequent propagation of Kabir's teachings. Modern studies consider the literature related to Dharmadas and the institutional development of the Kabir sect separately.

The works known under the name of Dharmadas cover themes such as Kabir, devotion, Guru, spiritual knowledge and liberation. Dharmadas is associated with the Kabir Sagar and other 'Sagar' type texts in the Dharmadasi Kabirist tradition; however, there are differing opinions among different traditions regarding the authorship, compilation and transmission of these texts.

=== Other saints ===
Other saints associated with the Nirguna tradition include saints such as Namdev, Sena, Dhanna and Pipa. Some of their compositions are included in the Guru Granth Sahib. However, since the religious views of all these saints and their place in the Nirguna tradition are not uniform, they are studied in separate historical and literary contexts.

The North Indian Nirguna tradition of saints influenced various saintly orders and regional literary traditions of the later period. This tradition spread poetic forms such as pada, sakhi, sabad and bhajan and strengthened the tradition of expressing religious thoughts in local languages.

== See also ==
- Hinduism
- Sikhism
- Kabir
- Kabir Panth
- Guru Nanak
- Ravidas
- Advaita Vedanta
- Salvation
- Satlok
