= Bhagalpur Metro =

Rapid transit system in Bihar, India

Overview
- Owner: Government of Bihar
- Locale: Bhagalpur, Bihar, India
- Transit type: Rapid transit
- Number of lines: 3 (Proposed)
- Number of stations: 22 (Proposed)

Operation
- Operation will start: 2029 (Planned)

Technical
- System length: 24 km (15 mi) (Proposed)

Bhagalpur Metro is a proposed rapid transit system in Bhagalpur, India. It was proposed by the Urban Development and Housing Department of the Government of Bihar to provide metro rail services in four major cities: Darbhanga, Gaya, Muzaffarpur, and Bhagalpur.

== Background ==
Chief Minister Nitish Kumar cabinet gave its consent in principle to run a metro train in Bhagalpur on 21 June 2024.

The Government of Bihar entrusted the feasibility study for the Bhagalpur Metro to Rail India Technical and Economic Service (RITES), a Navratna public sector undertaking under the Ministry of Railways.

On 16 February 2025, officials from RITES Limited submitted the survey report for the proposed Bhagalpur Metro to the Urban Development Department of the Bihar Government. The metro service is expected to become operational by 2029.

== See also ==
- Patna Metro
- Darbhanga Metro
- Gaya Metro
- Muzaffarpur Metro
