= Mithila State Movement =

Movement for proposed separate Mithila state in India

Mithila State Movement is a movement advocating a separate Mithila state in India.

== History ==
In 1902 AD, George Abraham Grierson, an official of the British Government, prepared a map of Mithila by conducting a language-based survey in the region. In 1921, Maharaja Rameshwar Singh of Darbhanga Raj raised the demand for a separate state of Mithila based on the concept of creating “a series of self-governing provinces and principalities federated by one central government.” In 1936, Odisha was separated from Bihar, but the demand of a separate Mithila state remained ignored. After the independence of India, the movement for the demand of separate Mithila state got further momentum by a number of political parties and their leaders.

=== 1990 - 2000 ===
In the March month of the year 1996, the Mithila Rajya Sangharsh Samiti initiated a mass contact campaign in the favour for separation of Mithila state from the state of Bihar in India. Similarly, in the July month of the year, the Mithilanchal Vikash Congress demanded for formation of an autonomous development council for the Mithila region in India.

=== 2000 - 2026 ===
In the year 2015, the then BJP's MP Kirti Azad demanded a separate Mithila state for Maithili speaking people, at the Parliament of India.

== Related organisations ==
The main role of Mithila State Movement is being done by 'Antarrashtriya Maithili Parishad', 'Mithila Rajya Nirman Sena', 'Sanyukta Mithila Rajya Sangharsh Samiti' 'Mithila Student Union' and The Pro Maithils.

== Industrial ruins in Mithila ==
In the earlier period, Mithila was full of industrial estates. There were many industries in the region in regime of Darbhanga Raj Kingdom. These industries were flourishing the economy of the region. After the independence of India, the rule of Darbhanga Raj Kingdom ended and then the industrial estates of the region started gradually closing due to the negligence of the central government as well as state government of Bihar. The region was full of many sugar mills, cotton mills, paper industries, chocolate factories and many more agricultural industries. In the last three decades, due to the castism politics in Bihar by the leaders there, the agenda of industrial development got neglected and gradually industries got closed. Nowadays these industrial estates have become ruins. This led to the migrations of labours and human resources from the area to the metropolitan cities of the country. The sugar mills of Sakari, Lohat, Raiyam and Samastipur was very famous in the country. Mithila was the bowl of sugar in India three decades ago. Hayaghat was famous for Ashok Paper Industry and similarly Pandaul was famous for Cotton mills. Purnea, Saharsa, Katihar, Muzaffarpur and, Darbhanga was famous for Jute industries since 1794 up to 1990.

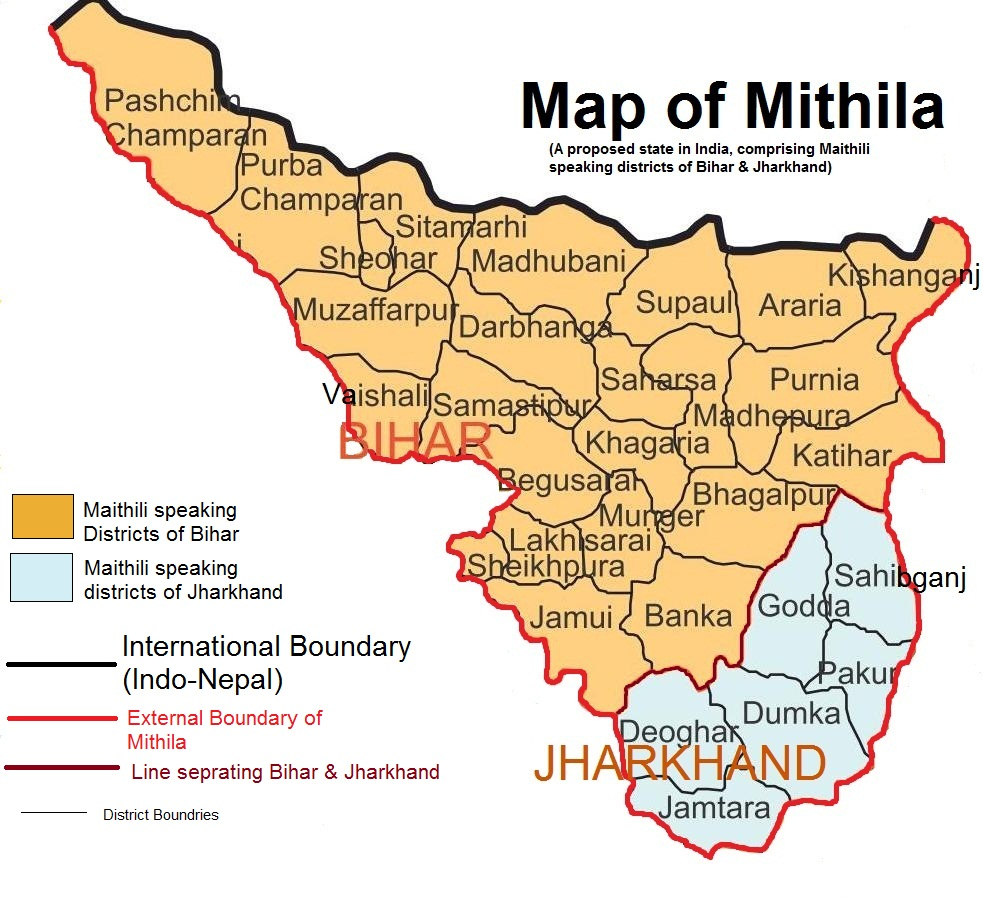
Proposed Map of Mithila State showing the districts of the proposed state.

== Tourism in Mithila ==
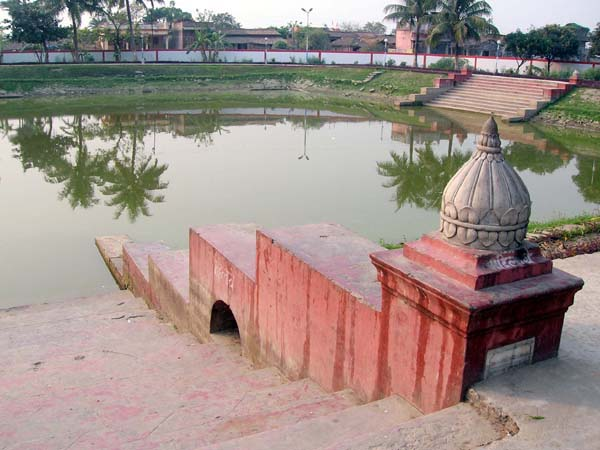
Janaki Kund, Birthplace of Sita, Parauna Dham, Sitamarhi, Mithila

Mithila is the part of Ramayana, Mahabharata and ancient Indian philosophy.

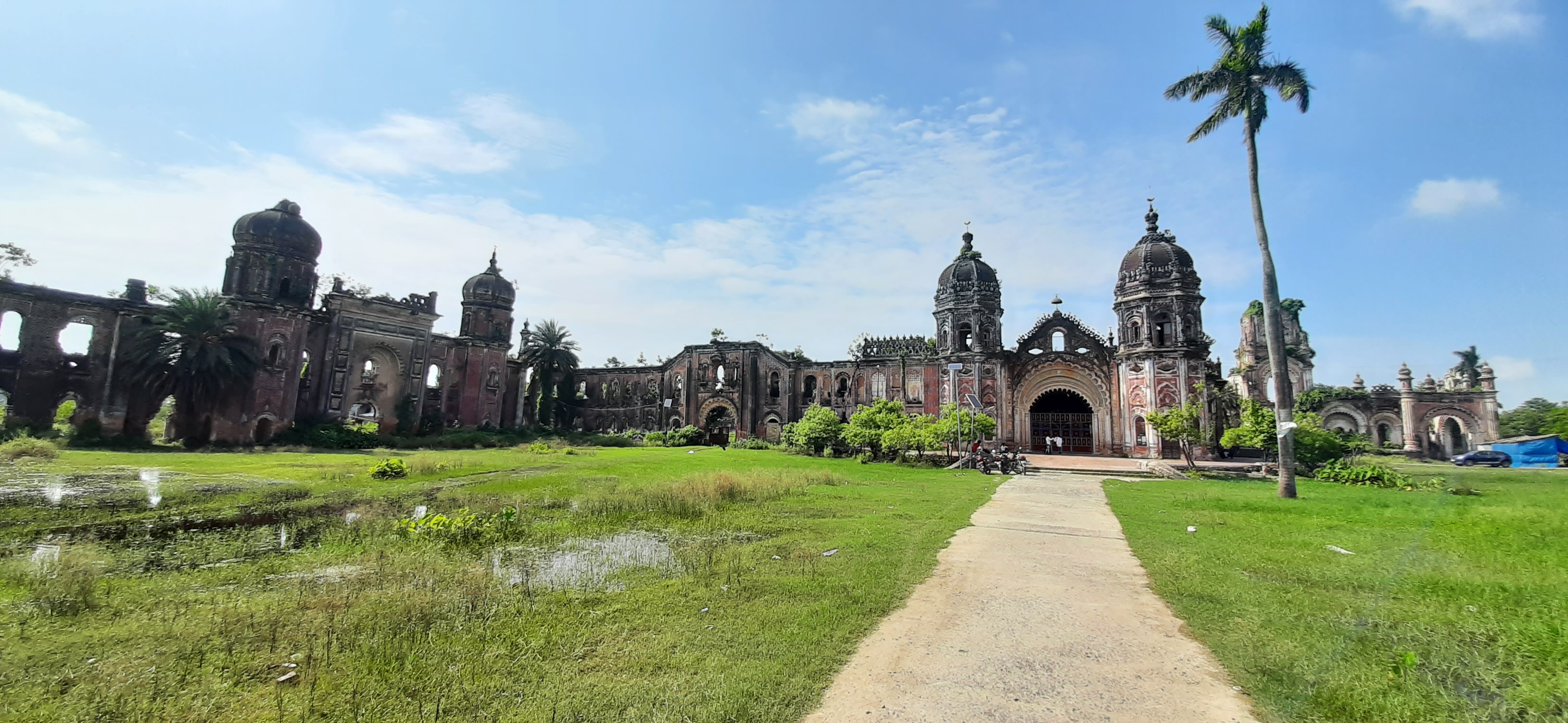
Ruins of Rajnagar Kingdom in Mithila
