= Laxman Jha =

Indian freedom fighter and scholar

Dr. Laksman Jha
- डा.लक्ष्मण झा
- Born: September 5, 1916; Rasiari Village, Darbhanga district, Mithila region, Bihar
- Died: January 22, 2000
- Other names: Lakhan Jha
- Citizenship: Indian
- Education: SOAS, University of London (PhD)
- Occupations: Freedom fighter, educator, intellect, and author
- Movement: India Freedom Movement and Mithila State Movement

Dr. Laksman Jha (Maithili: डा. लक्ष्मण झा) was a distinguished freedom fighter from the Mithila region who actively participated in India’s independence movement. He later emerged as a pioneering activist in the campaign for a separate Mithila state.

== Personal life and education ==
Dr. Laksman Jha was born on 5 September 1916 at Rasiari village of Darbhanga district in the Mithila region of Bihar. He was born in a Maithil Brahmin family. His father name was Kari Jha and mother was Kirti Devi.

He completed his primary education in his own village. Later he was admitted in Madhepur High School. His passed his secondary school examination in 1937 AD with first class. He was admitted in T N J college at Bhagalpur for intermediate courses. In 1939, he passed intermediate examination. In 1941, he completed graduation education in Sanskrit honours from Patna College. He was awarded gold medal for his outstanding performance in the result of the examination. Later Dr. Laksman Jha pursued his doctoral studies at the School of Oriental and African Studies, University of London, where he earned a PhD for his thesis on Mithilā and Magadha (700–1100 A.D.).

== Indian Freedom Movement ==
Dr. Laksman Jha started taking part in the freedom movement of India from age 11. Similarly he demonstrated against the Simon Commission and participated in the Civil Disobedience Movement during 1930–31 at the age of 15. In 1942, when Rajendra Prasad was arrested by British India government, Laksman Jha was made the General Secretary of the Bihar State Movement Committee to lead the August Revolution. Under his leadership, after the incident of hoisting the flag on the Secretariat and the death of seven students in police firing, the whole of Bihar jumped into the August Revolution. He joined Bharat Chhodo movement for the freedom of India from the British rule.

== Mithila State Movement ==
In 1952, Laksman Jha gave a new form to the Mithila-Maithili movement. He started a big movement for a separate Mithila state in India. Later he devoted and started working for Mithila-Maithili movement only. During the reorganization of states, he started a movement for a separate Mithila state.
