= Mithila =

Mithila may refer to:

== Places ==
- Mithilā, a synonym for the ancient Videha state
  - Mithilā (ancient city), the ancient capital city of Videha
- Mithila (region), a cultural region (historical and contemporary), now divided between India and Nepal
  - History of the Mithila region
  - Mithila (proposed Indian state)
  - Sanskrit and Vedic learning in Mithila

== People ==
- Mithila Chaudhary (1966–2022), Nepalese politician and communist activist
- Mithila Prasad Tripathi, Indian poet of Sanskrit language
- Mithila Sharma (born 1963), Nepalese dancer and actor
- Rafiath Rashid Mithila (born 1984), Bangladeshi actress
- Mithila Palkar (born 1993), Indian actress

== Other uses ==
- Mithila (moth), a genus of moths of the family Erebidae
- Mithila painting, an Indian painting style

== See also ==
- Maithili (disambiguation)
