= Antarrashtriya Maithili Parishad =

Social organisation in Mithila

- अंतरराष्ट्रीय मैथिली परिषद
- Formation: 20 June 1993; 32 years ago
- Founder: Dr. Dhanakar Thakur
- Founded at: Ranchi
- Region served: Mithila region
- Official language: Maithili

Antarrashtriya Maithili Parishad (Maithili: अंतरराष्ट्रीय मैथिली परिषद) is an organization dedicated to the promotion and preservation of the Maithili language, culture, and the overall development of the Mithila region, which spans parts of India (Bihar and Jharkhand) and Nepal. It was established on 20 June 1993, during the first international Maithili conference held in Ranchi, India. It has a widespread network across India and in several districts of the Terai region of Nepal. It represents the interests of the Maithili-speaking community to government bodies and other relevant institutions. It has played a role in significant achievements like the inclusion of Maithili in the Eighth Schedule of the Indian Constitution and its recognition as an official language in Jharkhand and provinces of Nepal. It also advocates the demand for the creation of separate Mithila state in India.
