= Mithila Rajya Sangharsh Samiti =

Social organisation in Mithila

- Ahkil Bhartiya Mithila Rajya Sangharsh Samiti
- मिथिला राज्य संघर्ष समिति
- Predecessor: Dr Jayakant Mishra
- Successor: Dr Baidyanath Chaudhary
- Formation: 1994
- Founder: Dr Jayakant Mishra; Dr Baidyanath Chaudhary; Dr Dhanakar Thakur and; Dr Amarnath Jha
- Type: Social organisation
- Purpose: Promotion of Maithili language; Creation of separate Mithila state in India
- Region served: Mithila region
- National President: Dr. Baidyanath Chaudhary "Baiju Babu"
- Parent organization: Antarrashtriya Maithili Parishad (International Maithili Council)
- Remarks: Advocating demand of separate Mithila state in India

Mithila Rajya Sangharsh Samiti (Maithili: मिथिला राज्य संघर्ष समिति) is a social organisation in India which advocates the demand of separate Mithila state for Maithils in the present state of Bihar. It organises several protests in the favour of creation of separate Mithila state in India. It had been continuously staging a strike for a separate Mithila state on the first day of every session of the Indian parliament for the previous several years at the premises of the Jantar Mantar in the national capital New Delhi of India.

The slogan of the organisation at the strike in the year 2010

In Maithili "Bhikh nahi adhikar chahi, Hamra Mithila raj chahi"

- English translation "We want rights not begging, we want Mithila state"

— Activists of the Mithila Rajya Sangharsh Samiti, Hindustan News (Hindi)

== History ==
In 1994, Mithila Rajya Sangharsh Samiti was formed to support the demand of the separate Mithila state in India. In March 1996, Mithila Rajya Sangharsh Samiti initiated a mass-contact campaign for the demand of a separate Mithila state. In 2009, when the central government gave nod to the process of the formation of Telangana, then Mithila Rajya Sangharsh Samiti planned to demonstrate protest in front of the parliament to put pressure on the central government for formation of the separate Mithila state. The national president Baidyanath Chaudhary of the organisation had asked all the MPs and MLAs of the region to unite for the creation of Mithila. In June month of the year, Dr Baidyanath Chaudhary submitted a memorandum to the then union home minister on the issue of the formation of separate Mithila state. After that the organisation planned to hold a public strike outside the parliament on 17 December 2009 in the favour of the demand for separate Mithila state. In the year 2010, the organisation in the leadership of the president Dr Baidyanath Chaudhary demonstrated a public strike on 20 August chanting the slogan "bhikh nahi adhikar chahi, hamra Mithila raj chahi" at the premises of the Jantar Mantar in New Delhi. On 10 September 2012, the organisation staged a sit-in protest in front of the Divisional Commissioner's Office at Saharsa led by the former MLA Sanjeev Kumar Jha. The protestors in the strike reiterated the demand of separate Mithila state for economic, political, educational and business freedom for the people of Mithila region. Similarly on 24 February 2015, the Mithila Rajya Sangharsh Samiti staged a protest at the Jantar Mantar in the national capital New Delhi demanding a separate Mithila state. On 20 September 2016, a delegation of five members of the organisation led by Amrendra Kumar Jha met the then union food, public distribution and consumer minister Ram Vilas Paswan to convey the issues of the Mithila region. The delegation informed about the demands of construction of dam on Koshi river for electricity production, facilitation to Maithili language as Rajbhasha of Bihar and initiation of Maithili language in primary education in the region. In 2018, the organisation launched a Rath Yatra known as Mithila Rajya Parisiman Jagriti Yatra which traveled several places in the Mithila region.

On 1 February 2023, the people of Mithila staged a protest at Jantar Mantar in the national capital New Delhi demanding a separate Mithila state under the aegis of Akhil Bhartiya Mithila Rajya Sangharsh Samiti. Similarly on 17 March 2023, the organisation launched a 70 days long padyatra which would cover 700 kms journey in the Mithila region demanding a separate Mithila state. On 21 March 2023, a huge protest was organized in front of the Darbhanga Divisional Commissioner's Office under the aegis of the Mithila Rajya Sangharsh Samiti demanding a separate Mithila state for the development of the Mithila region. On 9 August 2023, the organisation held a meeting in the auditorium of MLSM College in Darbhanga to unite various organizations demanding the formation of a separate Mithila state. In the meeting, it was decided to come on one platform and intensify the pace of the Mithila State Movement.

== Demands ==
The main demands of the organisation Mithila Rajya Sangharsh Samiti include a separate Mithila state, preservation and promotion of Maithili language, all-round development of Mithila. Besides these major demands, the organisation has proposal of a 35-point demand. The major demands in the proposed 35-point demand are establishment of IIT and IIM in the region, permanent solution from the floods in the region by building dams in Nepal, establishment of Doordarshan in Maithili language, prevention of migration and unemployment, and creation of Mithila regiment in the Indian Army.
