= Raghopur Narsanda Panchayat =

Raghopur Narsanda
- Village
- Nickname: Kumar Bajitpur
- Location in Bihar, India
- Coordinates: 25.8326°N 85.5552°E
- Country: India
- State: Bihar
- Region: Mithila
- Division: Tirhut
- District: Vaishali
- Panchayat: Raghopur Narsanda

Population (2011)
  - Total: 5,540

Languages
  - Spoken: Bajjika, Bhojpuri
- Time zone: UTC+5:30 (IST)
- PIN: 843110
- Telephone code: 91- 6227- XX XX XX
- ISO 3166 code: IN-BR
- Vehicle registration: BR-31
- Sex ratio: 1.0870 ♂/♀
- Lok Sabha constituency: Ujiarpur
- Vidhan Sabha constituency: Patepur
- Website: vaishali.bih.nic.in

Raghopur Narsanda is a village in the Vaishali district of Bihar, India, in Patepur Block. It is 60 km from the main local city of Patna, and 40 km from its district headquarters of Hajipur. Its nearest towns are Muzaffarpur (52.5 km) Patepur (5.2 km), Chehrakala (15.8 km), Jandaha (20.2 km), Samastipur (27.5 km) Mahnar (25.7 km), Garaul (26.4 km) and Tajpur (16 km).

== Locality ==
- V.I.P Colony
- West Tola
- Kusahi
- Kartal
- Batwarwa
- Ashma
- Aahra
- Asidha
- Raksi
