= Gaya Metro =

Proposed Metro Railway Service in the City of Gaya

Overview
- Native name: गया मेट्रो
- Locale: Gaya, Bihar, India
- Transit type: Rapid transit
- Number of lines: 2 (Proposed)
- Number of stations: 28 (Proposed)

Operation
- Operation will start: 2028
- Character: Elevated

Technical
- System length: 36.08 km (22.42 mi) (Proposed)
- Track gauge: 1,435 mm (4 ft 8 1/2 in) standard gauge

Gaya Metro is a proposed metro rail service in the twin cities of Gaya and Bodhgaya in India. It was proposed by the department of Urban Development and Housing Development of Bihar Government to provide facility of metro railway services in the four major metro cities Gaya, Muzaffarpur, Darbhanga and Bhagalpur.

== Project Details ==
Chief Minister Nitish Kumar's cabinet gave its consent in principle to run a metro train in Gaya on 21 June 2024. The Government of Bihar entrusted the task of finding out the feasibility of Gaya Metro operations to Rail India Technical and Economic Service (RITES) which is a Navaratna Company of central government under Railway Ministry.

On 16 February 2025, the official of RITES Limited submitted the survey report for the proposed Gaya Metro to the Urban Development Department of the Bihar Government. It is expected that the metro service will be operational by 2028.

The project will include two metro corridors that will cover a total distance of 36.08 kilometers. The first 23 km corridor will connect IIM Bodh Gaya to Sun City Chakand via Gaya Railway Station, which will include 18 stations. The second corridor, 14 km long, will connect Paharpur and Lakhanpur with 10 stations. This wide network would make it easier for locals and pilgrims to reach the region's well-known religious monuments, such as Vishnupad Temple and Mahabodhi Mahavihara. The project is expected to be completed in 2028.

== Route Network ==
The project will have two major corridors: North-South Corridor of 22.6 km length, connecting Sun City to IIM Bodh Gaya, and East-West Corridor of 13.48 km length, connecting Paharpur to Lakhanpur. A total of 28 stations are planned across both corridors.

=== Corridor 1 (North-South) ===
Terminals: Sun City Chakand, IIM Bodh Gaya

Length: 22.6 km

Alignment: Elevated

No. of Stations: 18

Depot: Jindapur

Stations:

- Sun City Chakand
- Kandi
- Nawada
- KP Colony
- Bageshwari Colony
- Gaya Railway Station
- Gandhi Maidan
- Jai Prakash Nagar
- Gaya College
- Sikaria Mod
- Environmental Park
- Paharpur
- Gaya Airport
- BIT (Birla Institute of Technology)
- Tekuna Mod
- Vastu Vihar
- Mahabodhi Temple
- IIM Bodh Gaya

=== Corridor 2 (East-West) ===
Terminals: Paharpur, Lakhanpur

Length: 13.48 km

Alignment: Elevated

No. of Stations: 10

Depot: Lakhanpur

Stations:

- Paharpur
- Brahma Van
- Bipard
- Naili
- Ashok Vihar Colony
- Sri Vishnupad Temple
- Bahor Bigha
- Surhari
- Siddharth Puri Colony
- Rasalpur

== See also ==
- Patna Metro
- Muzaffarpur Metro
- Darbhanga Metro
