= Maithili =

Maithili may refer to:

- Maithils, an ethno-linguistic group native to India and Nepal
  - Maithil Brahmin, a community within the Maithils
- Maithili language, an Indo-Aryan language spoken in India and Nepal
  - Maithili script or Mithilakshar, the traditional writing system used to write Maithili
  - Maithili literature
  - Maithili music
- Maithili Express, a mail/express type train of Indian Railways
- Maithili New Year, in the Maithili calendar
- Sita, a Hindu goddess, consort of Rama in the ancient Indian epic Ramayana
- Maithili Sharan (born 1953), Indian mathematician
- Maithili Sharan Gupt (1886-1964), Indian poet in Hindi
- Maithili Menon, fictional Indian spymaster in the YRF Spy Universe, portrayed by Revathi

== See also ==
- Mithila (disambiguation)
- Maithili Karna Kayasthak Panjik Sarvekshan, a research study on the available ancient manuscripts in the Mithila region
- Mithila (region), Bihar, India, inhabited by the Maithils
- Mythili (born 1988), Indian actress
- Purvottar maithili
- Tirhuta Panchang, the calendar followed by the Maithils
- mai:सम्मुख पन्ना, Maithili-language Wikipedia
