= Jayakant Mishra =

- Born: 20 November 1922; Varanasi, India
- Died: 3 February 2009 (aged 86); Allahabad, India
- Body discovered: Allahabad residence
- Education: Allahabad University(M.A., PhD)
- Alma mater: Allahabad University
- Occupations: scholar, author, language advocate
- Employer: Allahabad University
- Spouse: Shreemati A Devi (m. 1939)
- Parent: Umesha Mishra(father)
- Relatives: Pandit Jayadev Mishra(grandfather)

Jayakant Mishra (20 November 1922 – 3 February 2009) was an Indian scholar and author. He was a professor of English at Allahabad University, and an advocate for the Maithili language, where he petitioned the Government of Bihar to make its language instruction available for primary schools in the area. He worked tirelessly for the statehood of Mithila in India carving out from Bihar and Jharkhand from 1994 till his death.

== Early life ==
Mishra was born on 20 November 1922, in Varanasi. (Note: Mishra's birth month as stated as November by daughter Lila, although his friend Dhanakar Thakur has mentioned December.) His father, Umesha Mishra, and grandfather, Pandit Jayadev Mishra, were both mahamahopadhyaya titled scholars. Umesha Mishra studied Maithili and Sanskrit. In 1923, the Mishras moved to Allahabad.

== Career ==
In 1943, Mishra completed his M.A. degree in English Language and Literature at Allahabad University. In 1944, he joined their faculty as a lecturer in the Department of English and Modern European Languages. With Dr. Amarnath Jha as his thesis advisor, Mishra wrote his PhD dissertation on the history of Maithili literature.

Mishra continued in the faculty at Allahabad until 1983, when he retired as professor and head of their English department. From 1985 to 1988, he was the visiting professor of English at Sagar University. In 1986, he served on The All India Board for Research Awards in Humanities at Mysore. From 1992 to 1994, he served as the Dean of the Faculty of Languages and Social Sciences in Chitrakoot Gramodaya Visvavidyalaya.

Mishra was the editor for Vrihat Maithili Shabdakosh (वृहत मैथिली शब्दकोश/বৃহৎ মৈথিলী শব্দকোষ), the first Maithili-English dictionary. In 1973, he published the first part of the glossary, which covered words that began with "a". The dictionary would later be published in two volumes. The Maithili words were written in Devanagri and Tirhuta scripts, along with equivalent phonetics in English. It is considered an important landmark in Maithil literature.

According to article 350A of the Indian constitution, each State should provide facilities where primary education students can receive instruction in their local language. On 3 September 1998, Mishra filed civil writ CWJC-7505/1998 at the Patna High Court, against the Government of Bihar for not providing minimum primary education in Maithili medium to the Maithili-speaking region of Bihar. (Note: On 3 September 1998, Writ Petition, CWJC-7505/1998 was filed in High Court, Patna. Dr. Jayakant Mishra was the Petitioner, and Lalan Kumar Verma was his advocate. The Bihar Government was the respondent in the case and its advocate was A.N. Singh(SC8).) On 26 September 2003, Chief Justice R.N. Prasad ruled in favour of Mishra. In 2004, the Bihar government made a civil appeal (Civil Appeal No. 7266 of 2004) against Mishra to the Supreme Court. (Note: In the civil appeal, Manish Kumar and Gopal Singh were their advocates for the Bihar Government. Vijayendra Mishra and Anil Kumar Jha were the advocates for Mishra.) On 30 September 2010, The Supreme Court (Court No. 9) rejected the appeal. The Bihar government withdrew other similar cases (e.g., Civil Appeal No(s). 2203–2208 of 2001), concerning similar primary education rights.

Mishra formed Mithila Rajya Sangharsh Samiti, to get Mithila state created for people of North Bihar. In the 1990s, he worked with Dr. Dhanakar Thakur and Amarnath Jha "Bakshi" for this cause. He continued working for his dream state of Mithila till his death and worked on the slogan coined by workers of the movement – "Bhikh nahi adhikar chahi, Hamara Mithila Raj chahi".,

== Legacy ==
In 2009, Gajendra Thakur and the editors of the e-journal Videha – First Maithili Fortnightly published a series of English-Maithili dictionaries that were dedicated to Mishra along with other advocates. The series was later published as a comprehensive Videha English Maithili Dictionary.

== Personal life ==
In 1939, Mishra married Shreemati Devi, a Maithili poet and writer.

== Works ==
Some of Mishra's notable publications include:

- History of Mithili Literature – Mishra's PhD thesis.
- Introduction to The Folk Literature of Mithila (1950–51)
- The Critical Edition of Kirtaniya Dramas
- Lectures on Thomas Hardy (1955, 1965)
- Complex Style in English Poetry (1977)

== Awards ==
1967: Samman Patra by Akhil Bhartiya Maithili Sammelan, Bombay.
1989: Gaurinath Memorial Lectures.
1990: Tamra Patra by Chetna Samiti, Patna.
1995: Samman Patra by Mithila Sanskritik Sangam, Prayag.
1999: Samman Patra by Vidyapati Samiti, Dhanbad. 2001: Bhasha Samman by Sahitya Academy for the year 2000

== Notable positions ==
1943–2008: President, All India Maithili Sahitya Samiti, Allahabad.
1948: Member, Council of All India Oriental Conference.
1963–82: Member, Advisory Board and General Council of Sahitya Akademi.
1967–71: Secretary, G. N. Jha Research Institute, Allahabad.
1971–74: Founder-Secretary, Dr. Ishwari Pd. Institute of History, Allahabad.
1973–74: Prabandha Mantri & Sangrahalaya Mantri, Hindi Sahitya Sammelan, Allahabad.
1977: President, Diamond Jubilee Session of Asam Sahitya Sabha, Jorhat.
1984–89: Member, Executive Board of Maithili Akademi, Patna.
1993: Inaugurated First International Maithili Conference, Ranchi.
1996: President, Mithila Rajya Sangharsh Samiti(a unit of Antarrashtriya Maithili parishad), till his death .
1995–99: Editor, Maithili Section of "Encyclopaedia of Indian Literature" and "Modern/Medieval Indian Literature".

== See also ==
- Maithili language

== Sources ==
- Thakur, Dhanakar (2 February 2009). "Dr.Jaykant Mishra 1.2.09". drdhanakarthakur.blogspot.com.
