= Ramdev Mahato =

Former member of Bihar Legislative Assembly

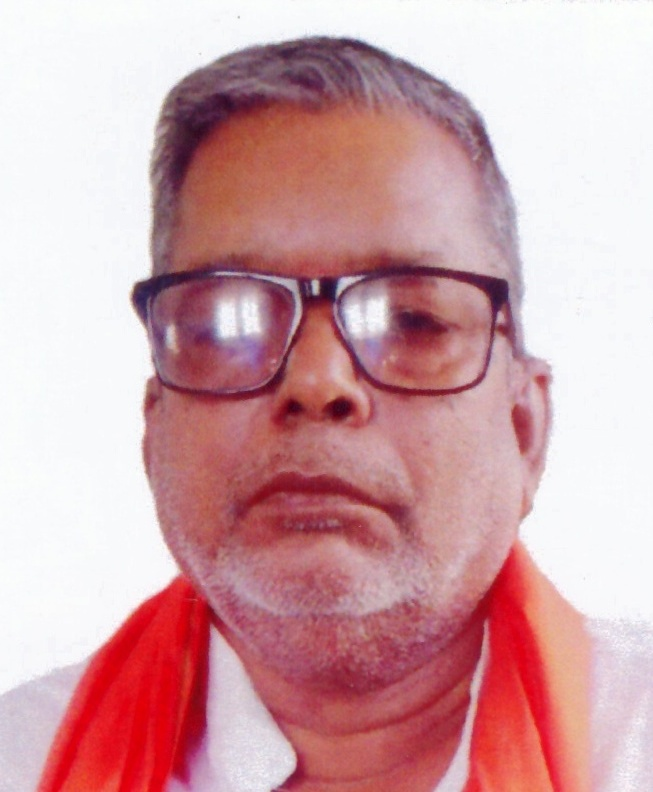

Member of the Bihar Legislative Assembly
- In office 2000–2015
- Preceded by: Raj Kumar Mahaseth
- Succeeded by: Samir Kumar Mahaseth
- Constituency: Madhubani

Personal details
- Party: Bhartiya Janata Party

Ramdev Mahato is an Indian politician and a former member of the Bihar Legislative Assembly from the Madhubani Assembly constituency. He had been elected from the Madhubani constituency to the Bihar Legislative Assembly four times between 2000 and 2010. Mahato was associated with the Bhartiya Janata Party (BJP) and recognised as an influential leader of the Mithilanchal region of Bihar. In the 2020 Bihar Assembly elections, he left the BJP and contested the elections of the Madhubani constituency as an independent candidate, as this constituency was allotted to Vikassheel Insaan Party in a seat sharing arrangement. He returned to the BJP in 2022.

== Political career ==
Mahato won Assembly elections of the Madhubani constituency in 2000, 2005, and 2010. In the 2015 election, Mahato finished second to Rashtriya Janata Dal candidate Samir Kumar Mahaseth. In the 2020 Bihar Assembly elections, he left BJP and contested as an independent candidate from the Madhubani constituency, losing to Samir Kumar Mahaseth again. In 2020, Mahato had accused BJP leaders of Bihar of not giving due importance to the ground level political workers and preferring candidates with money power over others in distribution of tickets to contest the elections. Consequently, he left BJP, but returned to it in 2022 once again after suffering a setback in the 2020 Assembly elections.
