= Darbhanga Metro =

Proposed Metro Railway Service in the City of Darbhanga

Overview
- Native name: दरभंगा मेट्रो
- Owner: Government of Bihar
- Area served: Darbhanga, Bihar
- Transit type: Rapid transit
- Line number: 2
- Number of stations: 18

Operation
- Operators: Department of Urban Development and Housing, Government of Bihar

Technical
- System length: 18.8 km (11.7 mi)

Darbhanga Metro is a proposed rapid transit system for the city of Darbhanga in the Mithila region of Bihar, India. The project was proposed by the Department of Urban Development and Housing, Government of Bihar, to introduce metro rail connectivity across four major cities in the state: Darbhanga, Gaya, Muzaffarpur, and Bhagalpur.

== Overview ==
On 21 June 2024, Chief Minister Nitish Kumar's cabinet granted in-principle approval for the Darbhanga Metro project. Initial alignment plans proposed connecting Darbhanga Airport, west of Darbhanga Junction railway station, Mirzapur, DMCH, Laheriasarai, and Ekmighat. The Government of Bihar entrusted RITES Limited, a Navratna public sector undertaking under the Ministry of Railways, with conducting the feasibility study. On 16 February 2025, RITES officials submitted the survey report to the state Urban Development Department, with operations projected to begin by 2029.

=== Proposed corridors ===
Initial route plans outlined two corridors: one from Darbhanga Airport to DMCH via Darbhanga Junction, and another from Bhavanipur to Government Polytechnic, Darbhanga, via Sakri (Dahora). According to the detailed project report (DPR) prepared by RITES, the network will span 18.8 km (11.7 mi) with 18 stations across two corridors:

- Corridor 1: 8.9 km (5.5 mi) with 8 stations, running from Darbhanga Airport to Darbhanga IT Park via Darbhanga Junction and DMCH.
- Corridor 2: 9.9 km (6.2 mi) with 10 stations, running from Darbhanga IT Park to AIIMS Darbhanga via Ekmighat.

During the public survey, local representatives and residents also requested a third corridor connecting Darbhanga Airport to AIIMS Darbhanga via Delhi More and Sobhan Chowk.

On 11 March 2025, Rajya Sabha MP Dharamshila Gupta raised the matter in Parliament, requesting an extension of the proposed network from 18.8 km (11.7 mi) to 22–24 km (14–15 mi).

== See also ==
- Muzaffarpur Metro
- Patna Metro
