= Maithili duck =

Species of bird

Maithili duck is a duck species native to the Indian state of Bihar. These ducks are mainly found in Araria, Sitamarhi, Katihar, Madhubani, Kishanganj and East Champaran districts of North Bihar. These districts form part of the cultural Mithila region, so these ducks are also called Mithila ducks.
