= Shrutadeva =

Devotee of Krishna in Hindu Puranas

- श्रुतदेव

Personal life
- Born: Videha
- Era: Dwapar Yuga
- Region: Mithila region
- Known for: Devotion to Lord Krishna

Religious life
- Religion: Sanatana Hinduism
- Creed: Vaishnava

Senior posting
- Based in: Mithila region

Shrutadeva (Sanskrit: श्रुतदेव) was a figure in Hindu Puranic literature. He was described as a devotee of Krishna in the Kingdom of Mithila. He was contemporary to Bahulashva Janaka in Mithila.

== Etymology ==
According to the Bhagavata Purana, the literal meaning of the word Shrutadeva is a Deva associated with knowledge.

== Description in Puranic literature ==
Shrutadeva was born in a family of Maithil Brahmin in the ancient Mithila Kingdom. In the text Bhagavata Purana, the sage Shukhadeva introduced about a great Brahmin named as Shrutadeva while narrating the text to the king Parikshita of the Kuru Kingdom. According to him, the Brahmin Shrutadeva was accomplished by all his goal of the life with the resolute single-minded devotion to the Lord Krishna. He was full of devotional wisdom and free from any attachments to the material pleasure. Due to his devotional attitude Bhakti towards Lord Krishna, later he became one of the pāriṣadas, i.e., members of the assembly, at the court of Lord Krishna in Dwarka.

In the section Vaishakhamasa Mahatmya of the second book known as Vaishnava Khanda of the text Skanda Purana, there is a dialogue between the sage Shrutadeva and the king Bahulashva Janaka of Mithila about the salvation of Pishacha. In this dialogue, the sage explained the importance of the ritual known as Vaishakha Vrata performed in the month of Vaishakha. He explained the importance of the ritual by giving the example of his own father's salvation.
