= Mithila Student Union =

Non-political student organisation

Mithila Student Union मिथिला स्टूडेंट यूनियन
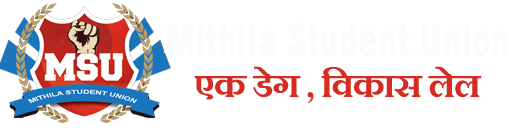
- MSU Flag
- Abbreviation: MSU
- Formation: 2015
- Founder: Anup Maithil, Nitish Karn, Raushan Maithil
- Type: Student Organization
- Legal status: Non-profit organizations
- Purpose: Activism, Development in Mithila Region
- Headquarters: New Delhi, Delhi, India
- Location: India
- Region served: India
- Official language: Maithili, Hindi, English
- National President: Vidya Bhushan Roy
- Website: mithilastudentunion.org

Mithila Student Union (MSU) (Maithili : मिथिला स्टूडेंट यूनियन) is a non-political student organisation whose sole purpose is the development of Mithila and Maithils living in India. It is one of the largest student organisations in Bihar. It is a registered organization under the provisions of the Societies Registration Act, 1860 under the Indian constitution. Anup Maithil is the founder president of Mithila Student Union. They mostly keep Mithila Art Boarded Maroon Gamchha on their Sholder which is the Symbol of Passion, Love, Bravery and Courage.

== History ==
The organization was established in 2015 to improve the education system, employment, migration issues, literacy, condition of health facilities, and scarcity of small-scale industries in the Mithila region.

- 6 May 2015: MSU's first campaign was a march to include Darbhanga, Saharsa, Purnia in the smart cities list under the leadership of Anup Maithil. MSU organized a public march, social media campaign and submitted memos to government offices and ministries. Darbhanga airport was another issue for which founder of MSU Anup Maithil raised a voice.
- 28 May 2016: In May 2016 Mithila witnessed the rise of a new activist group of young yellowed Senani's. About 100 active members reached Darbhanga from across the country. A movement to renovate and restart the old sugar mills was already present. Mithila was once the main producer of the country's finest sugar. This industry used to provide direct and indirect employment and benefits to more than 1 million local people. Agriculture was a good business then, as sugarcane production provided financial support. Over time the mills decayed. The MSU campaign became a hit, and the chini mill movement became the first movement in Mithila to gain high support from farmers, labourers, students, locals and intellectuals. A 7-day rally Included sabhas and nukkar-nataks. This movement mainly affected Raiyyam, Lohath, and Pandaul areas. Just before this movement, a few MSU members were arrested in an attempt to present memo to the CM Nitish Kumar, who was on his Darbhanga yatra. These arrests helped MSU to get the support of the people, and the movement gained public involvement. The government did not try to reopen the mills, MSU's profile and acceptance rose.
- 2 November 2016: MSU launched a membership campaign.
- 6 February 2017: The Cycle March of February caught public support and praise. This journey was to get to know Mithila better and make people aware of MSU and its goals. senani were constant travelers, and local teams joined and welcomed them as they arrived. This march (yatra) helped in getting links and helped to form teams in different blocks of these cities.

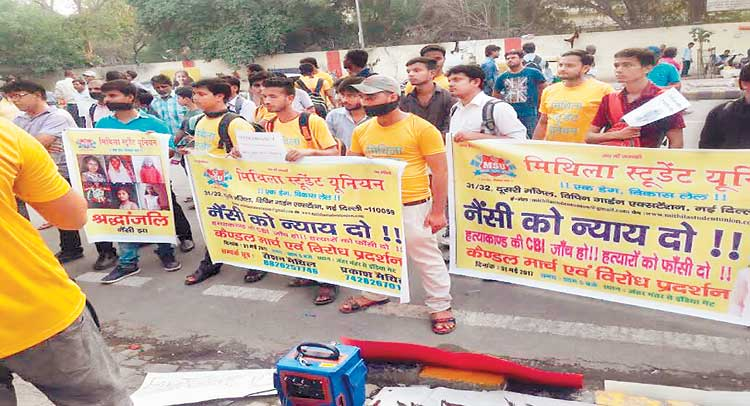
msu protested for CBI investigation for nancy jha murder case

- 1 June 2017: Nancy Jha was an 11-year-old girl in Mahadevmath of Madhubani. She was allegedly kidnapped and killed. Raushan Maithil, President of MSU, started a campaign after a family member of Nancy, contacted him. This campaign won public involvement and pressured local police and administration. A new SIT team was formed for Investigation. MSU members reached out to Nancy's village and teams around India joined Jantar Mantar and social media campaigns. This campaign gave Mithila-Maithili a new method, involvement, coverage and hope and support of people from many places and background. Local media people such as, Bj Bikas and Pankaj Prasoon started covering and following up.
- 7 August 2017: Yajuar is the second most populous village of Bihar. It has three Panchayat, covers 25 km^{2}, and around 70,000 residents, but lacks electric power. MSU started a campaign to highlight the issue with hashtag #BIjli2Yajuar. An MSU team reached Yajuar and started a Jan-Andolan, a cycle rally of children, and a protest in front of the Block Office. In 8 neighbouring villages, memoranda, meetings, mail and phone campaigns and a media campaign generated pressure on government officials.

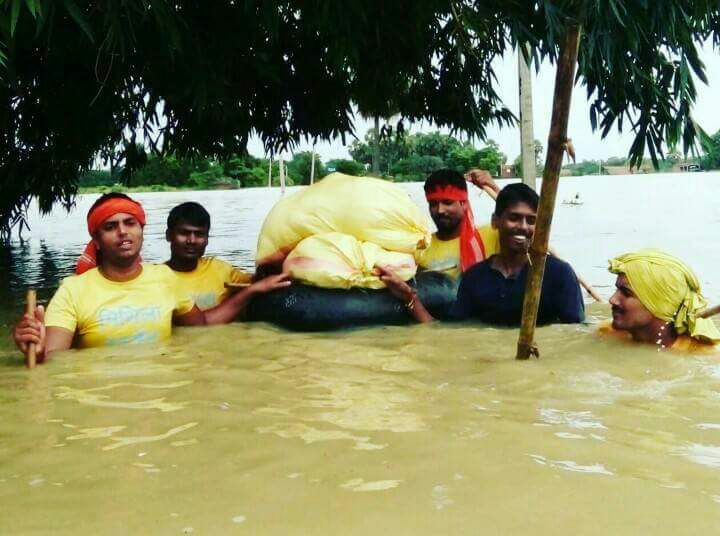
Msu's sainani carrying relief item for flood affected victims

- 19 August 2017: North Bihar was suffering from floods, killing hundreds, and leaving many hungry and homeless and millions affected. The road-embankment collapsed houses, closed the school hospital and spread disease. MSU members (MSU) reached villages, coordinating and donating food and other necessary items in the Darbhanga-Madhubani-Saharsa-Sitamarhi districts of Bihar. MSU started a social media campaign with hashtag #MSUwithU to collect funds online and a ground Bhikshatana was done for this purpose. This campaign brought a new face to MSU. More than 200 Active members in 6 districts were on the ground, divided into 16 teams to distribute relief packages, medicines, milk, clothes and other items. MSU units started 6 base camps where food items were made, packaged and divided for further distribution. They started medical camps and provided active support to government officials. They raised flood-aid funds, and collected many food-items and other essential articles. Afterwards, MSU published a list of all income and expenses in a detailed format.
- 18 September 2017: MSU activists carried out a candle march at Jantar Mantar in Delhi over the killing of 7-year-old student Pradhyumn Thakur. Police leveled a lathi charge on MSU members and the public who were protesting in front of the school, but eventually, they transferred the case to CBI after a long campaign and public pressure.

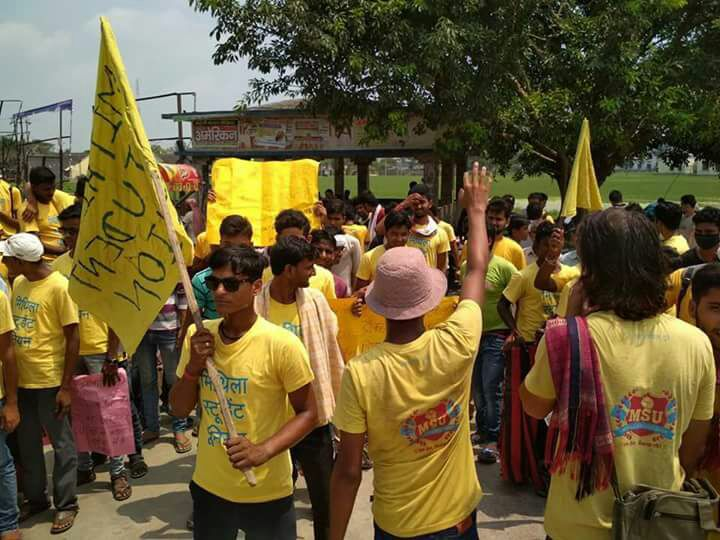
Mithila Student Union Senani (MSU) marched for LNMU movement on 15 November 2017

- 15 November 2017: Mithila Student Union (MSU) protested in Lalit Narayan Mithila University over issues such as lack of teaching staff, necessary education reforms and many more. LNMU Darbhanga is one of the most important universities in Mithila, educating approximately half a million college students, despite poor conditions. 70% of teaching and academic positions are vacant. The library, laboratory and hostel facilities are minimal. Classes are not regular, nor are curriculum, exams, or results. MSU tried to change this situation, without improvement, it formed a movement (andolan) on November 15, 2017. On November 15, more than 3,000 active members from all teams and students gathered in LNMU to protest. When the Vice-Chancellor came for discussion, he agreed on eleven agenda (mang) items and asked for time to fulfill them. Every media house covered it and their hashtags #MSU4LNMU trended on social media. The demonstration put MSU in conflict with local BJP Leaders.

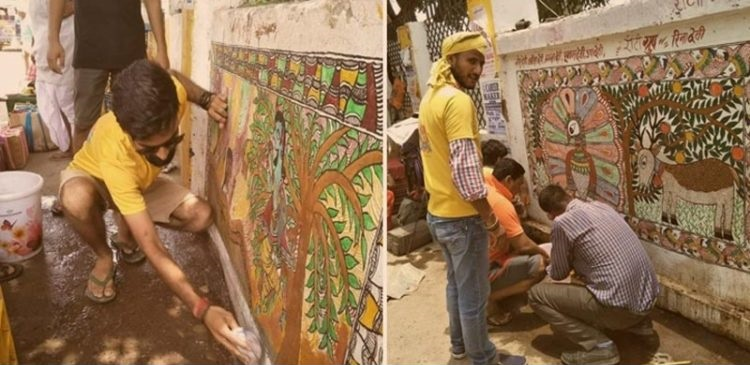
Msu cleaning Mithila painting of Madhubani station

- 16 June 2018: Walls - The Madhubani railway station was to display a Mithila painting. It was created by local artists. The Madhubani railway received the title of the second most beautiful railway station in India. Over time, the station was vandalized and became filled with garbage. The Mithila Student Union (MSU), a student union working for student and society interest in Mithilanchal, cleaned it.
- 1 October 2018: Mithilaband for MDB, On day before Gandhi Jayanti MSU had called for mithila band demanding for Mithila Development Board.

== See also ==
- Akhil Bharatiya Vidyarthi Parishad
- Mithila Rajya Sangharsh Samiti
