= Purvottar maithili =

Purvottar Maithili refers to a group of ethnic Maithils belonging to the Mithila region but have settled in the North-East region of India and have been there for centuries. Over time they have contributed a lot to the local linguistic and cultural heritage. They speak Maithili but are also fluent in Hindi and Bengali. They share very similar cultural ties with the Bengalis.

== Background ==
They migrated to this region since the times of the Ahom Kings for performing various religious duties. Later mass immigration of Maithils was during the time of the British who took them for labours in tea-estates.
