= Bahulashva Janaka =

King in Hindu literature

Bahulashva
- Predecessor: Dhriti
- Successor: Kriti
- Dynasty: Janaka Dynasty
- Religion: Hinduism

Bahulashva Janaka (Sanskrit: बहुलाश्व जनक) is a king in Hindu literature. According to the Puranas, he belonged to the Janaka dynasty of Mithila.

== Literature ==
According to the Bhagavata Purana, King Bahulashva Janaka was a devotee of Krishna. In his kingdom, there was a famous Brahmin known as Shrutadeva, also a devotee of Krishna.

In the text Bhagavata Purana, it is mentioned that Krishna was pleased with the devotion of both men, so he went on with his chariot Daruka to the Mithila Kingdom to meet them, accompanied by the sages Narada, Vamadeva, Vyasa, Atri, Asita, Aruni, Brihaspati, Kanva, Parashurama, Shuka, Maitreya, and Chyavana.

The religious text Garga Samhita gives an account of the dialogues between the King Bahulashva Janaka and Narada about the birth of the goddess Radha.
