= Samir Kumar Mahaseth =

Indian politician

Member of the Bihar Legislative Assembly
- In office 2015–2025
- Constituency: Madhubani Assembly constituency

Personal details
- Born: 1958 (age 67–68) Madhubani, Bihar, India
- Party: Rashtriya Janata Dal
- Parent: Raj Kumar Mahaseth (father)
- Education: M.Com, Lalit Narayan Mithila University
- Occupation: Politician

Samir Kumar Mahaseth (born 1958) is an Indian politician from Bihar. He is an MLA from Madhubani Assembly constituency in Madhubani district. He won the 2020 Bihar Legislative Assembly election representing the Rashtriya Janata Dal.

== Early life and education ==
Mahaseth is from Madhubani, Bihar. He is the son of Raj Kumar Mahaseth, a three time MLA of Janata Party. He completed his M.Com. in 1979 at L. N. M. University, Darbhanga. Earlier, he did B.Com. in 1977, B.com at Ram Krishan College, Madhubani.

== Career ==
Mahaseth won from Madhubani Assembly constituency representing Rashtriya Janata Dal in the 2020 Bihar Legislative Assembly election. He polled 71,332 votes and defeated his nearest rival, Suman Kumar Mahaseth of Vikassheel Insaan Party, by a margin of 6,814 votes. He was first elected from Madhubani in the 2015 Bihar Legislative Assembly election.
