= Madhubani Assembly constituency =

Vidhan Sabha Constituency in Bihar, India

Coordinates: 26°22′N 86°05′E

Madhubani
- Constituency No. 36 for the Bihar Legislative Assembly

Constituency details
- Country: India
- Region: East India
- State: Bihar
- District: Madhubani
- Lok Sabha constituency: 6. Madhubani
- Established: 1951
- Total electors: 339,367
- Reservation: None

Member of Legislative Assembly
- 18th Bihar Legislative Assembly
- Incumbent Madhav Anand
- Party: RLM
- Alliance: NDA
- Elected year: 2025

Madhubani is an assembly constituency in Madhubani district in the Indian state of Bihar. In 2015 Bihar Legislative Assembly election, Madhubani will be one of the 36 seats to have VVPAT enabled electronic voting machines.

== Overview ==
As per Delimitation of Parliamentary and Assembly constituencies Order, 2008, No. 36 Madhubani Assembly constituency is composed of the following: Madhubani municipality; Basuara, Bhachhi, Bhavara, Lachhminagar, Sonaur, Maksuda, Khajuri, Shambhuar, Sundarpur, Bhitthi, Balia gram panchayats of Madhubani community development block; and Pandaul CD Block.

Madhubani Assembly constituency is part of No. 6 Madhubani (Lok Sabha constituency). Samir Kumar Mahaseth is the current MLA from Madhubani.

== Members of the Legislative Assembly ==
Year	Name	Party
1952	Hari Nath Mishra	Indian National Congress
1957	Ram Krishna Mahato	Independent
1962	Braj Bihari Sharma	Indian National Congress
1967	Shafiqullah Ansari	Indian National Congress
1969	Surya Narayan Singh	Praja Socialist Party
1972	Surya Narayan Singh	Samyukta Socialist Party
1977	Digambar Thakur	Janata Party
1980	Raj Kumar Mahaseth	Janata Party (Secular)
1985	Padma Chaubey	Indian National Congress
1990	Raj Kumar Mahaseth	Independent
1995	Raj Kumar Mahaseth	Janata Dal
2000	Ramdev Mahato	Bharatiya Janata Party
2005	Ramdev Mahato	Bharatiya Janata Party
2005	Ramdev Mahato	Bharatiya Janata Party
2010	Ramdev Mahato	Bharatiya Janata Party
2015	Samir Kumar Mahaseth	Rashtriya Janata Dal
2020	Samir Kumar Mahaseth	Rashtriya Janata Dal
2025	Madhav Anand	Rashtriya Lok Morcha

== Election results ==
=== 2025 ===
2025 Bihar Legislative Assembly election: Madhubani
Party	Candidate	Votes	%	±%
RLM	Madhav Anand	97,956	46.38	
RJD	Samir Kumar Mahaseth	77,404	36.65	−1.35
AIMIM	Rashid Khalil	12,971	6.14	
JSP	Anil Kumar Mishra	8,453	4.0	
Jagrook Janta Party	Ram Sagar Sharma	4,760	2.25	
NOTA	None of the above	3,528	1.67	−0.56
Majority		20,552	9.73	+6.1
Turnout		211,208	62.24	+8.13
RLM gain from RJD		Swing		

=== 2020 ===
2020 Bihar Legislative Assembly election: Madhubani
Party	Candidate	Votes	%	±%
RJD	Samir Kumar Mahaseth	71,332	38.0	−7.27
VIP	Suman Kumar Mahaseth	64,518	34.37	
LJP	Arvind Kumar Purbey	15,818	8.43	
Independent	Ramdeo Mahto	8,247	4.39	
Samajwadi Janata Dal Democratic	Amanullah Khan	7,344	3.91	
Independent	Mihir Kumar Jha 'Mahadeo'	4,866	2.59	
The Plurals Party	Madhu Bala Giri	2,804	1.49	
RPI(A)	Dinesh Mandal	2,057	1.1	+0.68
Independent	Anita Kumari Alias Anita Jha	2,001	1.07	
Bhartiya Chetna Party	Anpurna Devi	1,738	0.93	
NOTA	None of the above	4,181	2.23	−0.29
Majority		6,814	3.63	−0.67
Turnout		187,739	54.11	+1.12
RJD hold		Swing		

=== 2015 ===
2015 Bihar Legislative Assembly election: Madhubani
Party	Candidate	Votes	%	±%
RJD	Samir Kumar Mahaseth	76,823	45.27	
BJP	Ramdeo Mahto	69,516	40.97	
SP	Naiyar Azam	3,874	2.28	
Independent	Raju Kumar Raj	3,219	1.9	
Independent	Vijay Mahto Alies Sanjay Kumar Mahto	2,539	1.5	
BSP	Mithilesh Kumar Das	2,508	1.48	
Bhartiya Mitra Party	Md. Inamur Rahman	1,907	1.12	
Independent	Ranjeet Kumar Jha	1,530	0.9	
NOTA	None of the above	4,282	2.52	
Majority		7,307	4.3	
Turnout		169,692	52.99	
