= Sakri, Madhubani =

Sakri panchayat is a town in the Madhubani district of Bihar, in Pandaul block.

Latitude: 26.282608 (26° 16' 57")

Longitude: 86.0653124 (86° 3' 55")

PIN Code: 847239
