= Muzaffarpur Metro =

Rapid transit system in Bihar, India

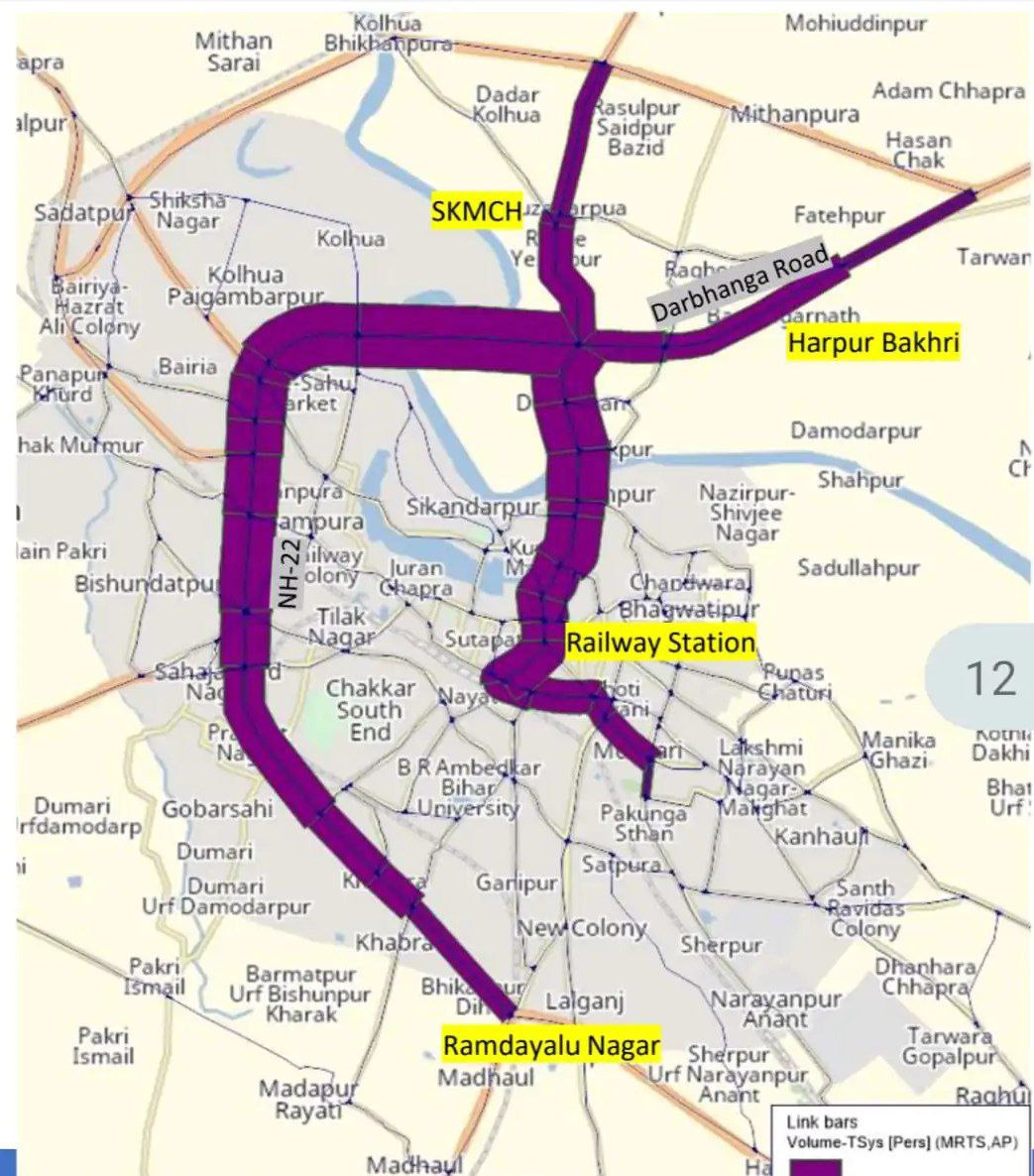

Overview
- Locale: Muzaffarpur, Bihar, India
- Transit type: Rapid transit
- Number of lines: 2 (Proposed)
- Number of stations: 20 (Proposed)

Technical
- System length: 21.25 km (13.20 mi) (Proposed)

Muzaffarpur Metro is a proposed rapid transit system in Muzaffarpur, India. It was proposed by the department of Urban Development and Housing Development of Bihar Government to provide facility of metro railway services in the four major metro cities Darbhanga, Gaya, Muzaffarpur and Bhagalpur.

== Background ==
Chief Minister Nitish Kumar cabinet gave its consent in principle to run a metro train in Muzaffarpur on 21 June 2024.

The Government of Bihar entrusted the task of finding out the feasibility of Muzaffarpur Metro operations to Rail India Technical and Economic Service (RITES) which is a Navaratna Company of central government under Railway Ministry.

On 16 February 2025, the official of RITES Limited submitted the survey report for the proposed Muzaffarpur Metro to the Urban Development Department of the Bihar Government. It is expected that the metro service will be operational by 2029.

== Project details ==
The Muzaffarpur Metro Project is estimated to cost ₹5,359 crore. The project will include two metro corridors that will cover a total distance of 21.2 kilometers.

== See also ==
- Patna Metro
- Darbhanga Metro
- Delhi Metro
