= Mithila (proposed state) =

Mithila मिथिला Videha and Tirhut
- Proposed state
- Seal
- Motto(s): Joy Mithila, Joy Maithili
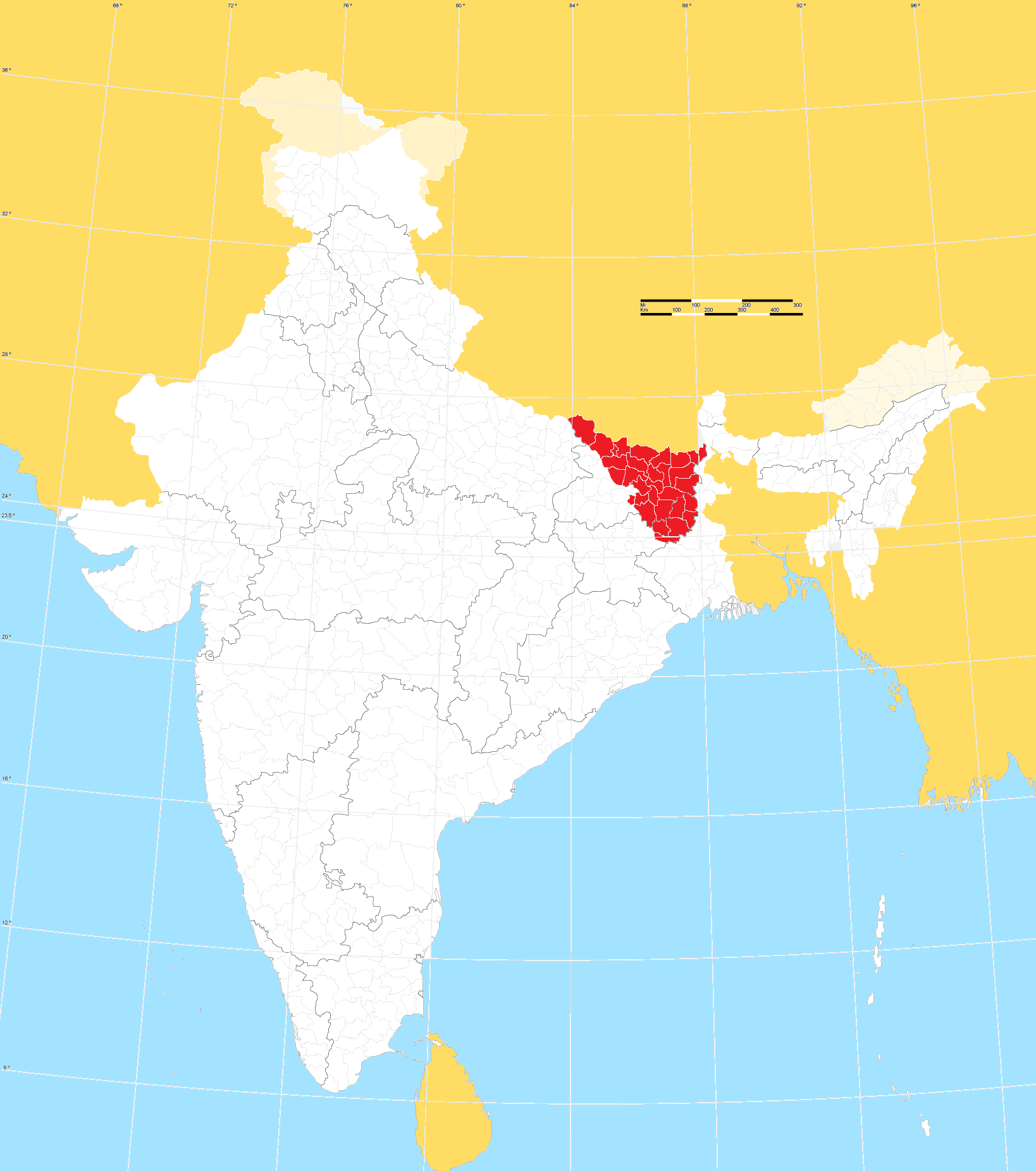

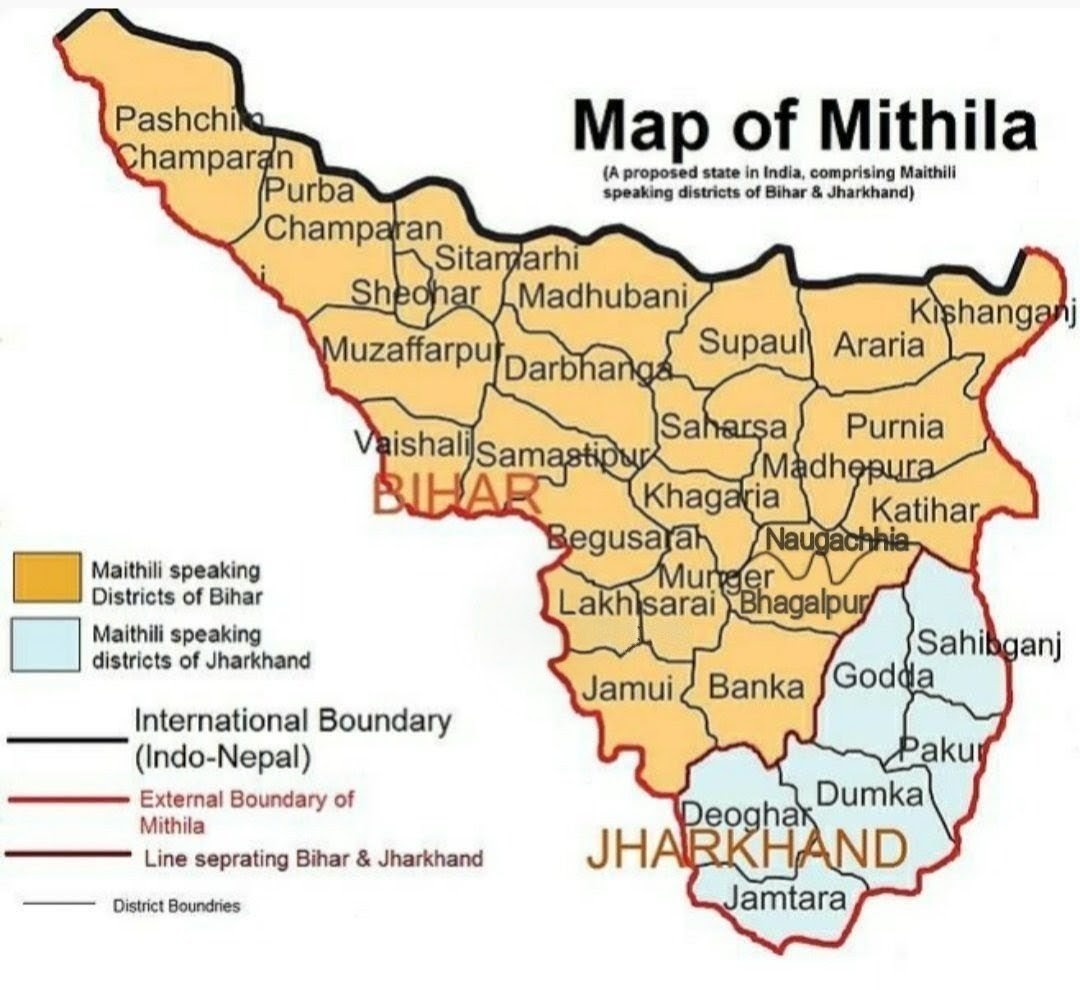
- Country: India
- Region: Mithila
- Proposed Capital: Begusarai, Bhagalpur, Darbhanga
- Demonym: Maithil
- Language: Maithili

Mithila is a proposed state in India, comprising the Maithili-speaking region of Bihar and Jharkhand. The Maithili language has its own traditional script, known as Mithilakshar. It is part of the historical Mithila region. The proposed state will also include Angika and Bajjika-speaking districts, which are considered to be dialects of Maithili.

There was also a movement in the Maithili-speaking areas of Nepal for a separate province which ended in 2015, after Constitution of Nepal (2015) ensured it in form of Madhesh Province.

== History ==
In 1902 AD, George Abraham Grierson, an official of the British Government, prepared a map of Mithila by conducting a language-based survey in the region. In 1921, Maharaja Rameshwar Singh of Darbhanga Raj raised the demand for a separate state of Mithila based on the concept of creating “a series of self-governing provinces and principalities federated by one central government.” In 1936, Odisha was separated from Bihar, but the demand of a separate Mithila state remained ignored. After the independence of India, the movement for the demand of separate Mithila state got further momentum by a number of political parties and their leaders.

=== 1990 - 2000 ===
In the March month of the year 1996, the Mithila Rajya Sangharsh Samiti initiated a mass contact campaign in the favour for separation of Mithila state from the state of Bihar in India. Similarly, in the July month of the year, the Mithilanchal Vikash Congress demanded for formation of an autonomous development council for the Mithila region in India.

=== 2000 - 2026 ===
In the year 2015, the then BJP's MP Kirti Azad demanded a separate Mithila state for Maithili speaking people, at the Parliament of India. Dr. Laksman Jha and others demanded a Mithila state shortly after independence, and the former Chief Minister of Bihar, Jagannath Mishra also expressed support for the creation of the state.

Various organisations have been formed that demand the formation of a state including the Maithil Mahasabha and the Mithilanchal Vikash Congress the former received support from Raj Darbhanga. Various demonstrations have taken place demanding a Mithila state with a major protest taking place in Delhi in 2009 organised by the Akhil Bharatiya Mithila Rajya Sangharsh Samiti.

== Political support ==
=== Mithila Rajya Nirman Sena ===
- Senior BJP leader, Rangnath Thakur, chairman and Founding member of Mithila Rajya Nirman Sena, has organised public rallies supporting Mithila.

Mithila Rajya Nirman Sena also did a Sankalp yatra under his leadership in 2017 and 2021 to create awareness and support for the movement

=== Bharatiya Janata Party ===
- Former BJP MP Kirti Azad from Darbhanga (Current Congress leader) has organised multiple dharnas and protests in support of Mithila. He has also launched a signature campaign in Mithila aiming to raise awareness.
- Senior BJP leader, Tarakant Jha, former chairman of Bihar Legislative Council, has organised public rallies supporting Mithila.

=== Janata Dal (United) ===
- In November 2011, Bihar Chief Minister Nitish Kumar also extended his support for the statehood of Mithila.
- Shravan Chaudhary, JDU state president, has openly supported the demand for the statehood of Mithila.

=== Rashtriya Janata Dal ===
- Rabri Devi, former CM of Bihar, has always favoured the creation of a separate Mithila state.

== Slogans in the Movement ==
"Bhikh naay odhikar chahi, hamra Mithila Rajya chahi"

"Badd Kelho Upekchhit Bybhaar

Aab naay rahbo Bihar ro Bhaag

Bihari naay Hummy Maithil Chhikiye

Mithila Rajya Chhai Hummar Maang"

"Maithil naay karu bahar ma kaaj, Odhikar mange mai kathi ke laaj?"

Mithila Chitrakaari wala Bordered Maroon Gamchha = Maithil ke Pahichaan

"Bihar Maithil ro Biboshta Chhikai, Mithila Rajya ro Aawashokta Chhikai"

"Ekta Sonkalp dhiyan ma, Mithila Rajya huy Sombidhan ma"

"Jongarna ma Maithili Sombidhan ma Mithila"

== Justification for Separation ==
The demand for separate Mithila state has been there since creation of State of Bihar in 1912. The demand for a separate Mithila state has been associated with the region's linguistic and cultural identity, economic conditions and administrative requirements. Proponents of the demand have raised several issues concerning the development and representation of the Mithila region within Bihar.Jha, Mithilesh Kumar (2018). Language Politics and Public Sphere in North India: Making of the Maithili Movement. Oxford University Press.

- Maithili the language of the region has not been properly recognised. The 8th schedule of the Constitution of India includes the recognition of 22 languages including Maithili, but in the Devanagari script rather than the original Tirhuta script. In Bihar Maithili is yet to receive any official status.
- Negligence of Maithil identity in the state of Bihar.

== Challenges ==
The Mithila region faces several socio-economic challenges, particularly in its rural areas. Flooding, unemployment, migration, agricultural difficulties and limited industrial development have affected the region's economy and livelihoods.

=== Flooding and river erosion ===
Mithila is a poor and flood-prone region dependent on subsistence agriculture, leading to doubts over its economically feasibility as a separate state. Flooding is a recurring problem in Mithila, particularly in districts situated along the Kosi, Ganga, Gandak, Bagmati, Kamla Balan and Burhi Gandak rivers. During the monsoon season, floods frequently damage agricultural land, houses, roads and other infrastructure. Riverbank erosion and prolonged waterlogging also affect settlements and farming activities. According to the World Bank, approximately 73 per cent of Bihar's geographical area is flood-prone.Bihar Water Security and Irrigation Modernization Project (Report). World Bank. 2025. The 2024 floods caused damage to households and livelihoods across several districts of northern Bihar. A survey of 2,290 households in seven districts documented losses involving housing, agriculture, livestock, drinking water and sanitation.Household-level Flood Loss Assessment 2024 (Report). Megh Pyne Abhiyan. 2025.

=== Unemployment and migration ===
The limited availability of employment opportunities has contributed to migration from the region. Many people leave their villages and towns to work in other parts of India, particularly in the construction, manufacturing, transport and service sectors. Agriculture remains an important source of livelihood, but employment outside agriculture is limited in many rural areas. The lack of large industries and manufacturing facilities has also restricted opportunities for local employment.

=== Challenges to Maithili linguistic unity ===
The preservation of Maithili's linguistic unity remains an important concern within the Mithila region. Angika, Bajjika, Mondarika, Deogharia, Thethi and Sotipura are regarded by some Maithili scholars and language activists as important regional dialects of Maithili. These varieties represent the linguistic diversity of different parts of Mithila and form part of its wider cultural and literary heritage.

The separate classification and promotion of these speech varieties as independent languages have generated disagreements within the Maithili-speaking community. Some Maithili scholars and activists have expressed concern that the fragmentation of the Maithili linguistic identity could weaken its collective recognition, reduce its institutional representation and create divisions among people who share a common linguistic and cultural heritage.

The issue has also been raised in connection with language politics in Bihar, where different regional linguistic identities have received separate institutional recognition and promotion. Proponents of a unified Maithili identity consider the preservation of the relationship between these regional varieties and Maithili important for maintaining the linguistic and cultural cohesion of Mithila.

The concern extends beyond linguistic classification to the future of Maithili education, literature, cultural institutions and political representation. Supporters of linguistic unity argue that regional speech varieties should receive recognition and protection without losing their connection to the wider Maithili language and its literary tradition.

=== Agricultural problems ===
Agriculture is one of the main occupations in Mithila. Farmers cultivate paddy, wheat, maize, vegetables and other crops. The region is also known for makhana cultivation and fisheries. However, agricultural activities are affected by recurring floods, drought-like conditions, fragmented landholdings, inadequate irrigation and crop losses. Limited cold-storage facilities and food-processing industries also create difficulties in storing and marketing agricultural produce.

=== Education and healthcare ===
Access to quality education and healthcare remains a concern, particularly in rural areas. Although the region has several schools, colleges and universities, access to specialised educational institutions and professional courses remains uneven. Healthcare facilities also vary between urban and rural areas. Residents of smaller towns and villages often depend on larger cities for specialised medical treatment. According to NITI Aayog's 2025 Bihar report, the state's literacy rate was 61.8 per cent, based on Census 2011 data, compared with the national average of 73 per cent.Summary Report for the State of Bihar (Report). NITI Aayog. 2025.

=== Industrial development ===
Industrial development in much of the Mithila region has remained limited compared with major industrial centres in India. Agriculture and small-scale businesses continue to provide livelihoods for a large section of the population. The limited presence of manufacturing industries, food-processing units and other large employers has restricted the diversification of the regional economy. Better transport facilities, investment and industrial infrastructure have been identified as important requirements for future development.

=== Infrastructure and connectivity ===
Several rural areas continue to face difficulties relating to road connectivity, drainage, sanitation and access to public services. Flooding can further disrupt transport and communication by damaging roads and bridges. Improved railway and road connectivity, urban infrastructure, irrigation facilities and reliable public services are among the development requirements frequently raised in discussions about the region.

== List of the districts in the proposed state ==
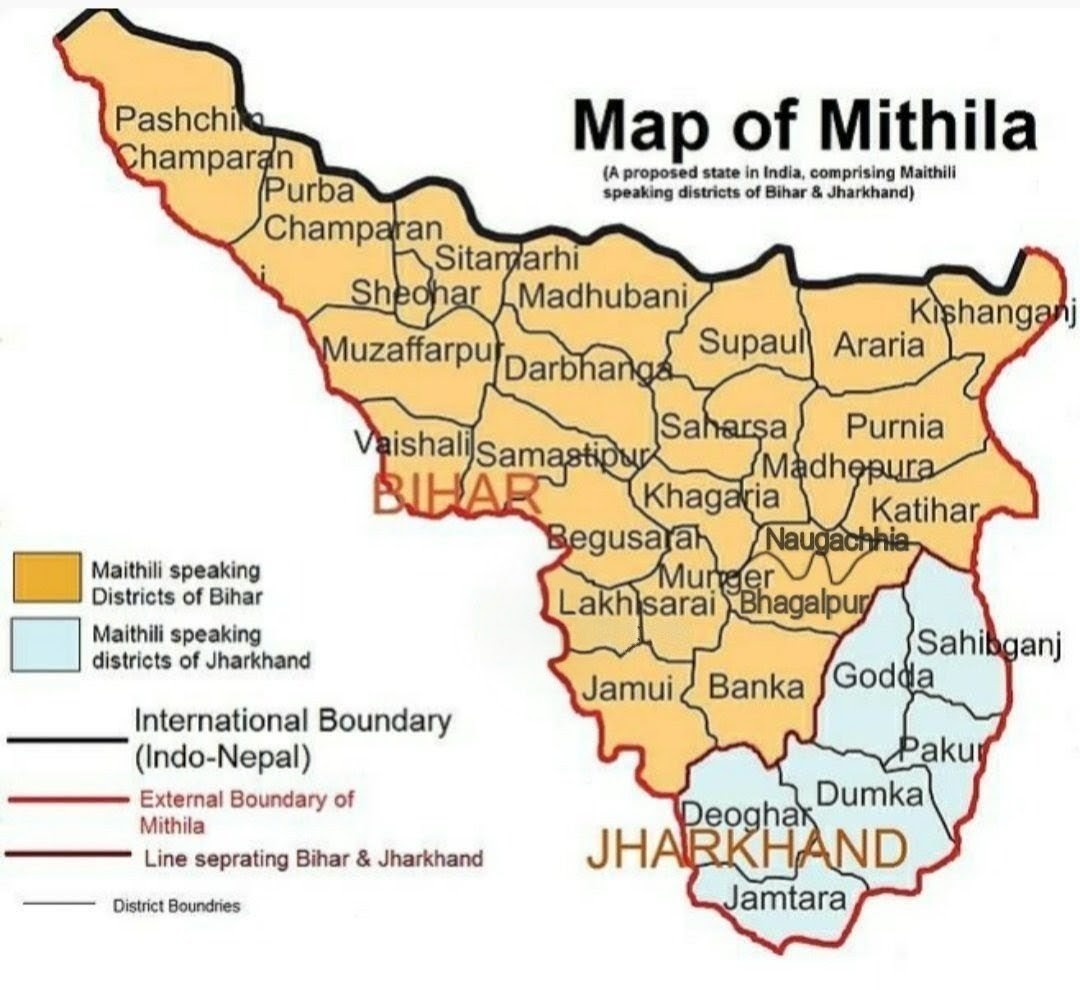
Proposed Mithila State Map

Naugachhia, Sitamarhi, Madhubani, Darbhanga, Purnia, East Champaran, Muzaffarpur, Saharsa, Vaisali, Madhepura, Begusarai, Munger, Bhagalpur, Samastipur, Sheohar, Supaul, Araria, Katihar, Kishanganj, Banka, West Champaran, Khagaria, Jamui, Lakhisarai, Sheikhpura and some districts of the present Jharkhand which are Deoghar, Dumka, Pakur, Godda, Jamtara and Sahibganj. Currently Begusarai is industrial and financial capital of Bihar and economically one of the most prosperous region in Mithila region. Begusarai is the Cultural capital of the Mithila. Sitamarhi is the birthplace of Goddess Sita. Some scholars claimed Baba Baidyanath Dham as the part of ancient Mithila. According to Ramayana and Mahabharata the entire part of land from North Ganga to Himalaya and Gandak (Sadanira) is the part of Greater Mithila Kingdom. The Greater Mithila is also called as Videha in the ancient Vedic texts and Vajjika in democratic Mithila Empire after the end of Janaka period in Mithila Kingdom. In the period of Vajjika League the centre of Mithila was shifted to Vaishali.

Vaishali

In this period Buddhism flourished in the region of Vaishali. In the period of Nanyadeva, the centre of Mithila was at Champaran

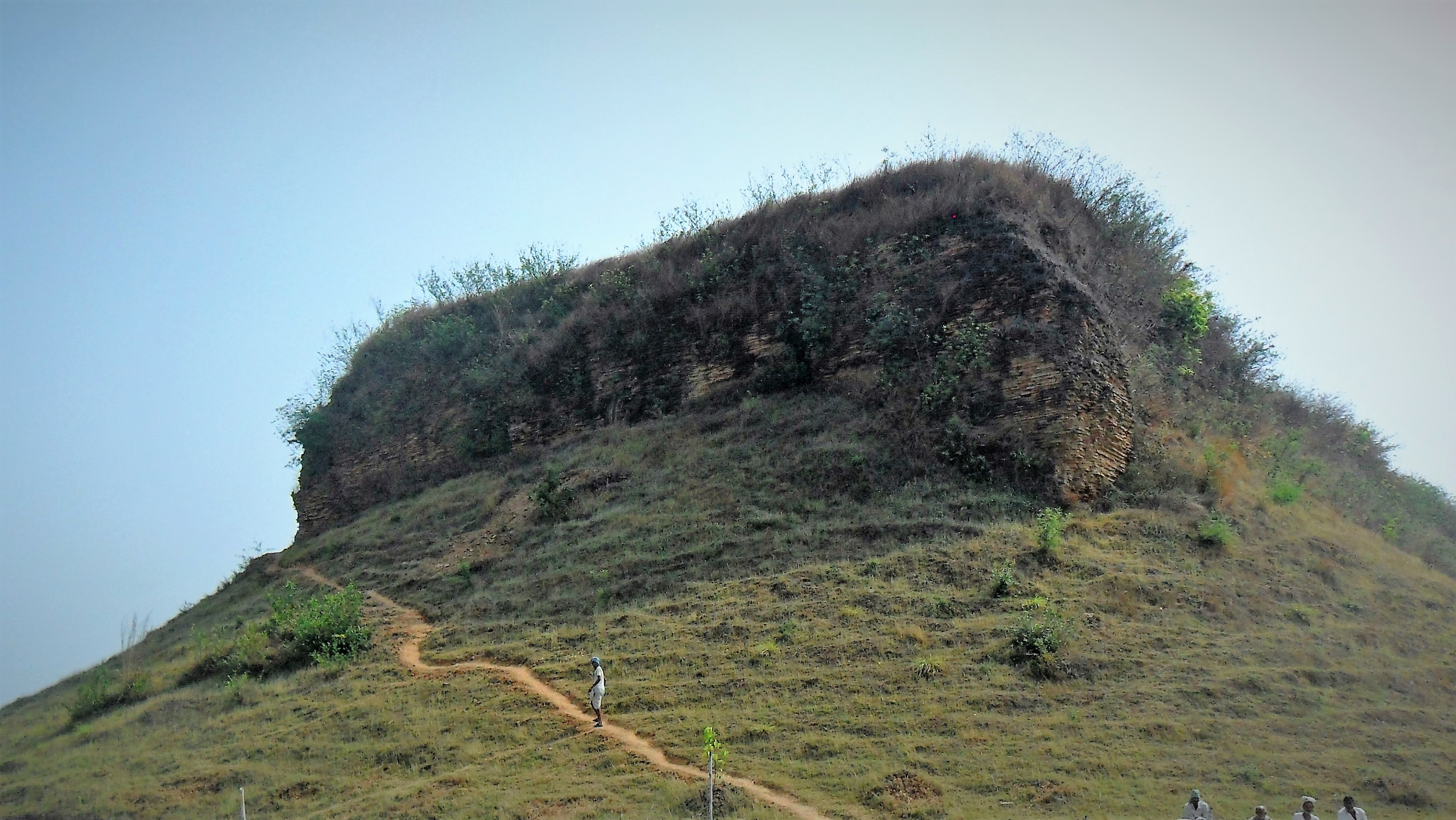
Janaki garh, Chankigarh, Champaran

. In the period of Mahesh Thakur, the centre of Mithila was at Madhubani and Darbhanga. The last kingdom of Mithila was Darbhanga Raj Kingdom. This kingdom ended after the independence of India. The Kingdom got merged into the Union of India in 1947 and became the part of present Bihar state demanding the separate Mithila State for Indian part of Mithila.

== See also ==
- Mithila, Nepal
- Maithili language
- Maithili literature
- Maithil
- Maithili Music
- Mithila Painting
- Mithila Makhana
- Mithila (region)
- Saharsa
- Darbhanga
- Maithili (disambiguation)
