= Mithila (region) =

Mithila मिथिला
- Cultural region
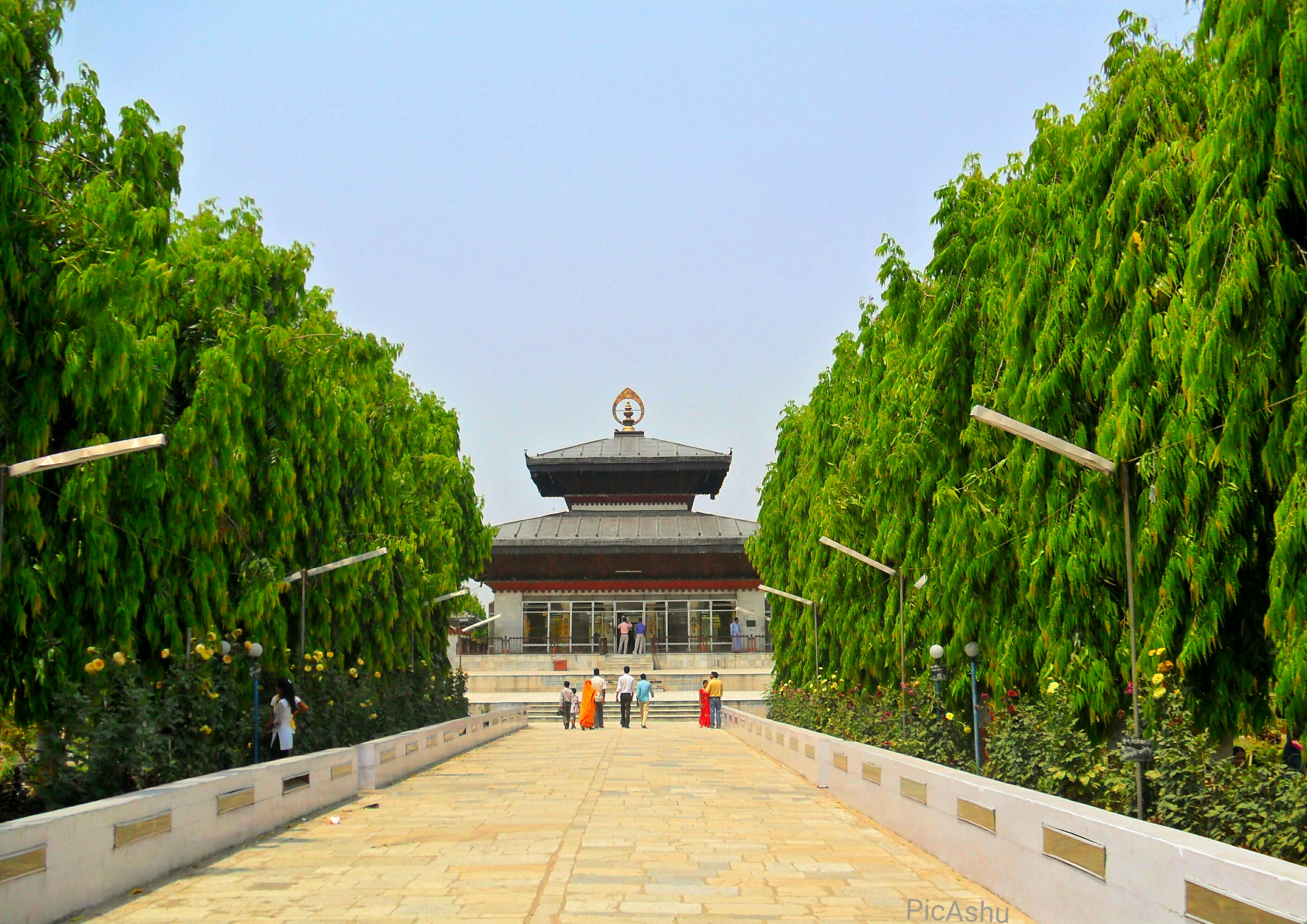
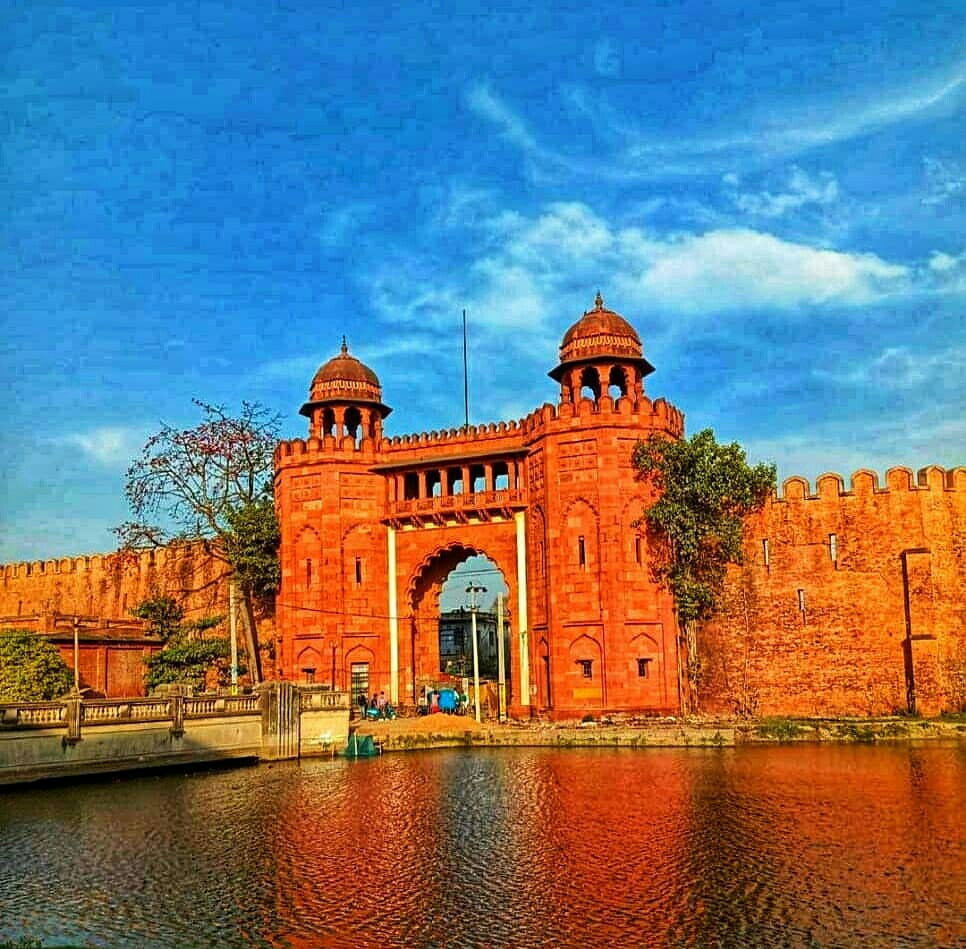
- Top to bottom: Vivah Mandap (Janakpurdham, Nepal), Royal Insigna of Raj Darbhanga & Darbhanga Fort

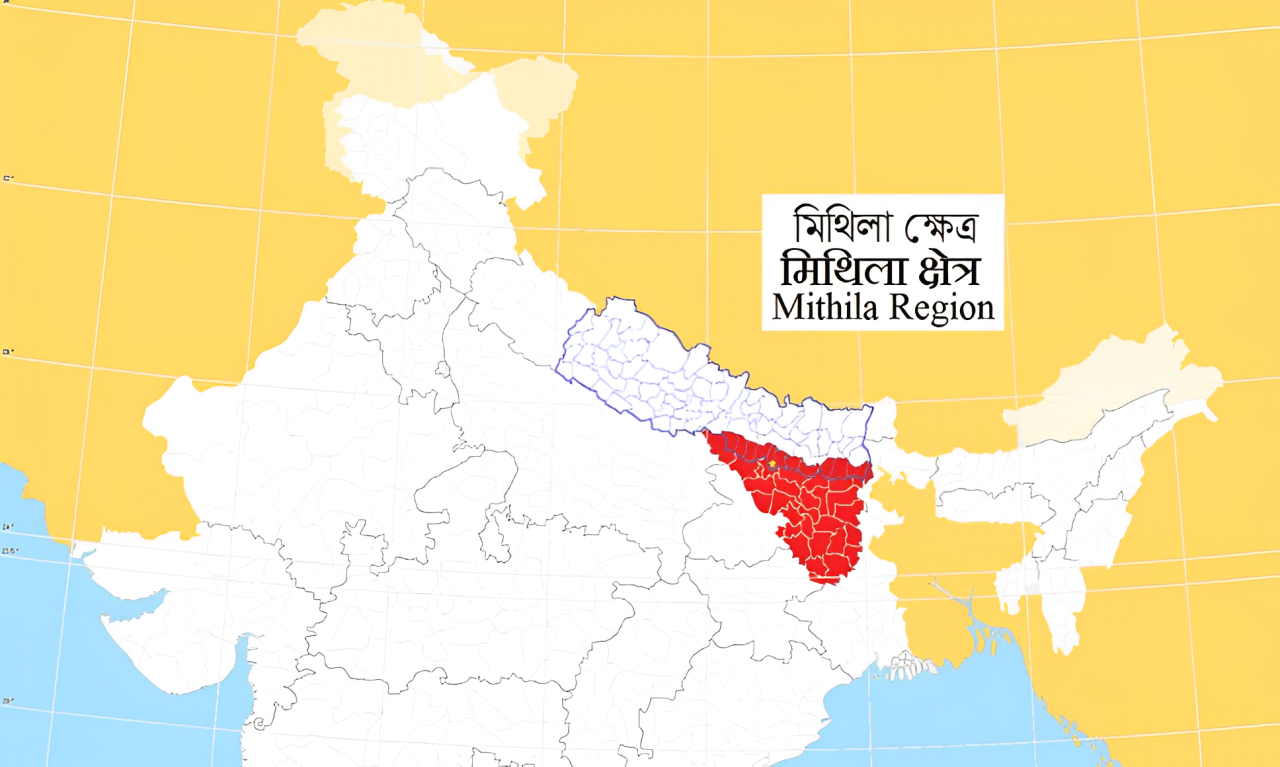
- Map of the Mithila region of India & Nepal
- Continent: Asia
- Countries: India and Nepal
- States or Provinces: Bihar and Jharkhand (India) and Madhesh Province, Koshi and Bagmati Province (Nepal)
- Founder: Videgha Mathava
- Named for: King Mithi
- Demonym(s): Maithils; Tirhutiya; Mithilabasi
- Regional Language(s) and/or dialect(s): Maithili; Bajjika; Angika and several other dialects of Maithili

Mithila (IAST: Mithilā), also known as Tirhut, Tirabhukti and Mithilanchal, is a geographical and cultural region of the Indian subcontinent bounded by the Mahananda River in the east, the Ganges in the south, the Gandaki River in the west and by the foothills of the Himalayas in the north. It comprises certain parts of Bihar and Jharkhand states of India and adjoining districts of the Koshi Province, Bagmati Pradesh and Madhesh Province of Nepal. The native language in Mithila is Maithili, and its speakers are referred to as Maithils.

Mithila is commonly used to refer to the Videha Kingdom, as well as to the modern-day territories that fall within the ancient boundaries of Videha. Until the 20th century, Mithila was still ruled in part by the Raj Darbhanga. In Buddhist annals, it is also known as Miyulu. According to the document of Archeological Geography of Ganga Plains, the Balirajgarh fort in the Madhubani district is regarded as the capital of ancient Mithila. In the present time, there is a ruins of ancient large fort dating back to 300 BCE - 200 BCE.

== History ==
=== In Jainism ===
Mithilā is one of the most significant pilgrimage sites in Jainism. Apart from its association with Mahavira, the 24th Tirthankara, it is also known for its association with Mallinatha, the 19th Tirthankara, and Naminatha, the 21st Tirthankara. As per the Śvetāmbara canon, the first four of the five significant events of the life of Mallinātha and Naminātha happened at Mithilā. The fifth one, which is the attainment of nirvana, happened at Sammet Shikharji.

Mahavira spent 6 varshās (monsoon seasons) at Mithilā. Akampita Swāmi, one of his 11 ganadharas, was born in Mithilā. Additionally, as per ancient Śvetāmbara texts, a branch of ancient Jaina ascetics was known as "Maithiliya" after Mithilā, signifying its historical importance as a center of Jaina scholarship.

Vividha Tirtha Kalpa, a 14th century CE Śvetāmbara Jaina text by Ācārya Jinaprabhasūrī, describes Mithilā as a major Jaina pilgrimage center. The scripture locates Mithilā in the Tirhuta region near the confluence of the Bāna Gangā and Gandaki rivers. It also mentions a village called "Jagai", where temples dedicated to Mallinātha and Naminātha existed. The site is also connected to Sita's marriage, "Sakulla Kunda". Some researchers suggest that "Jagai" may be an abbreviation of Jagadishpur, near present-day Sitamarhi. In their pilgrimage parties of 17th century CE and 18th century CE respectively, Panyās Saubhāgyavijaya and Panyās Vijayasāgara mention the location of the Jaina pilgrimage of Mithilā near present-day Sitamarhi in Bihar. The temples fell into disrepair, possibly due to a lack of Jaina population. The only remnant was the footprints of Mallinātha and Naminātha. These footprints were later preserved in Bhāgalpur. Based on historical evidence and research, initiatives to restore Mithilā’s lost Jaina heritage were launched. A two-storey temple along the Sitamarhi-Dumra road was constructed. In 2015, the foundation was laid by Ācārya Mahendrasāgarasūrī of Kharatara Gaccha. In 2020, the ritualistic installation of idols was conducted by Ācārya Piyushsāgarasūrī of Kharatara Gaccha and Ācārya Vinayasāgarasūrī of Tapa Gaccha.

=== Vedic period ===
Mithila first gained prominence after being settled by Indo-Aryan peoples who established the Videha kingdom. During the Later Vedic period (c. 1100–500 BCE), Videha became one of the major political and cultural centers of Ancient India, along with Kuru and Panchala. The kings of the Videha Kingdom were called Janakas. The Videha Kingdom was incorporated into the Vajjika League, which had its capital in the city of Vaishali, and is also in Mithila.

=== Medieval period ===
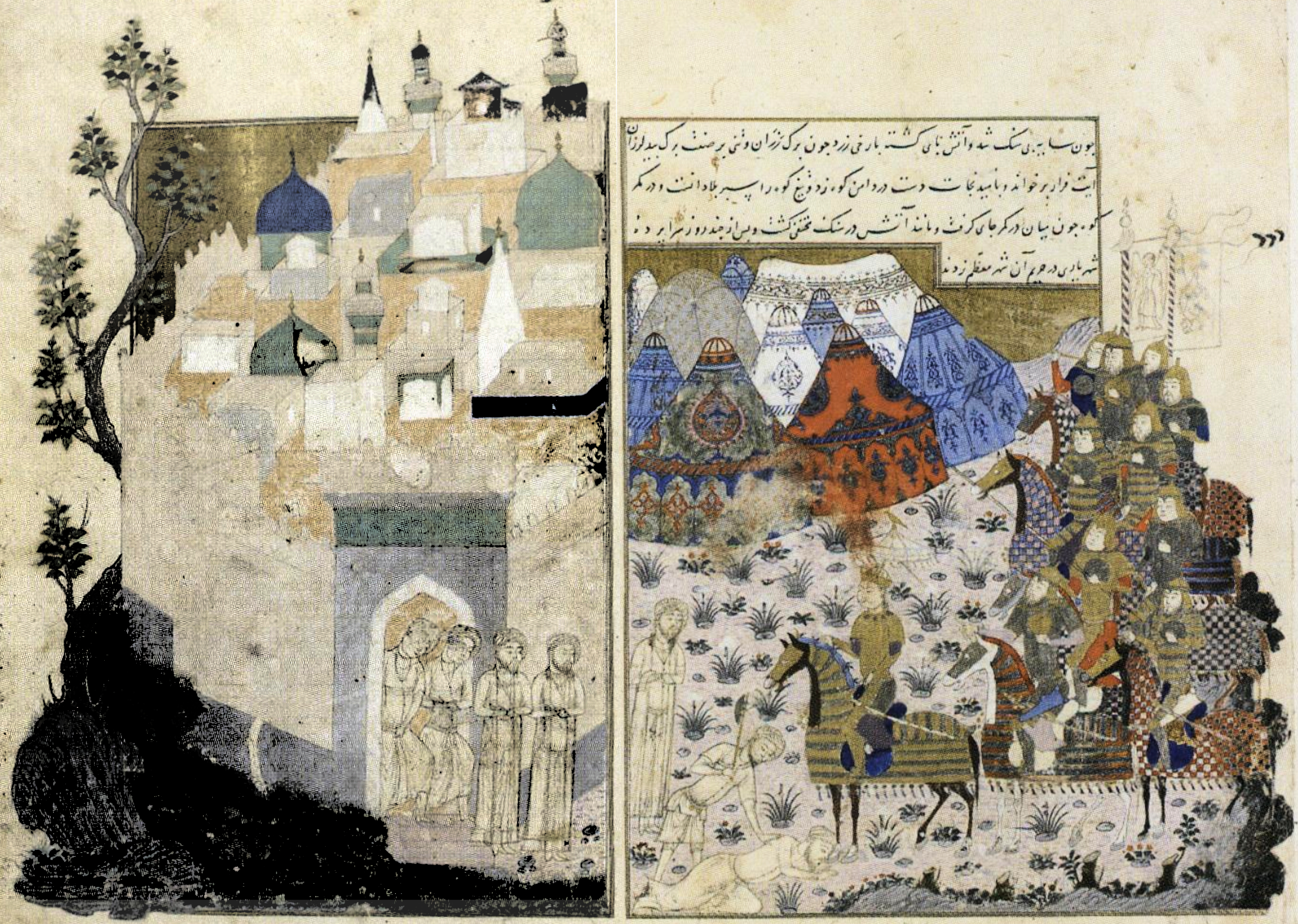
Ghiyath al-Din Tughluq leading his troops in the capture of the city of Tirhut. Depicted by eyewitness Muhammad Sadr Ala-i in his work Basātin al-uns, published ca.1410. Istanbul, Topkapi Palace Museum Library, Ms. R.1032.

From the 11th century to the 20th century, Mithila was ruled by various indigenous dynasties. The first of these was the Karnats of Mithila, the Oiniwar Dynasty and the Khandwala Dynasty, also known as Raj Darbhanga. The Malla dynasty and Licchavi dynasty of Nepal are also Maithil in origin. The rulers of the Oiniwar Dynasty and the Raj Darbhanga were Maithil Brahmins. The Oiniwar Dynasty originated from the village Oini in the Samastipur district of the Mithila region. It was during the reign of the Raj Darbhanga family that the capital of Mithila was shifted to Darbhanga.

Tughlaq had attacked and taken control of Bihar, and from the end of the Tughlaq Dynasty until the establishment of the Mughal Empire in 1526, there was anarchy and chaos in the region. Akbar (reigned from 1556 to 1605) realised that taxes from Mithila could only be collected if there was a king who could ensure peace there. The Maithil Brahmins were dominant in the Mithila region and Mithila had Maithil Brahmin kings in the past.

Akbar summoned Rajpandit Chandrapati Thakur to Delhi and asked him to name one of his sons who could be made caretaker and tax collector for his lands in Mithila. Chandrapati Thakur named his middle son, Mahesh Thakur, and Akbar declared Mahesh Thakur as the caretaker of Mithila on the day of Ram Navami in 1557 AD.

Lakshmeshwar Singh (reigned from 1860 to 1898) was the eldest son of Maharaja Maheshwar Singh of Darbhanga. He, along with his younger brother, Rameshwar Singh received a western education from Government appointed tutors as well as a traditional Indian education from a Sanskrit Pandit. He spent approximately £300,000 on relief work during the famine of 1873–74. He constructed hundreds of miles of roads in various parts of the Raj, planting them with tens of thousands of trees for the comfort of travellers, as part of generating employment for people effected by famine. He constructed iron bridges over all the navigable rivers

He built, and entirely supported, a first-class Dispensary at Darbhanga, which cost £3400; a similar one at Kharakpur, which cost £3500; and largely contributed to many others.

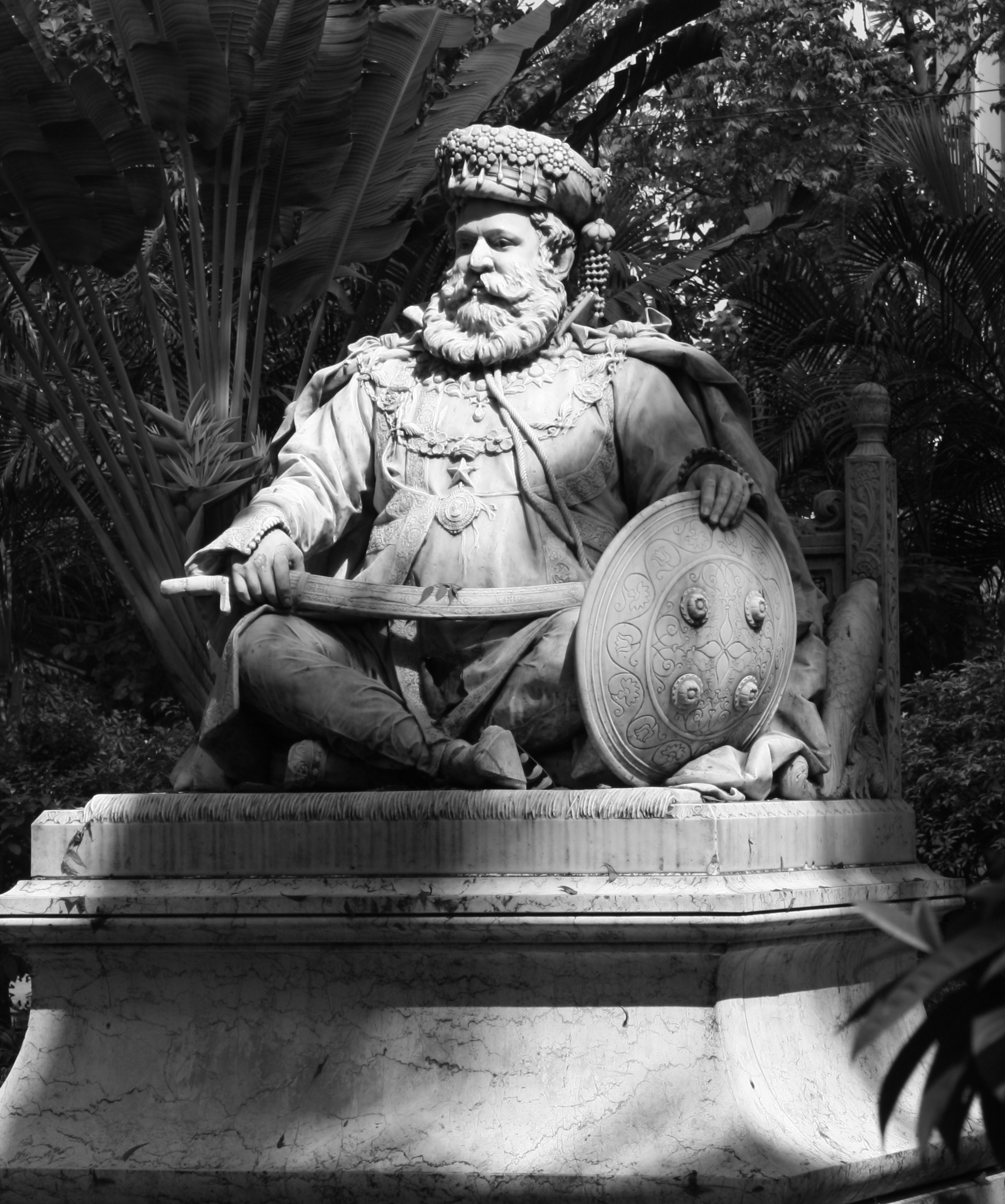
Maharaja Lakshmeshwar Singh

He built an Anglo-vernacular school at a cost of £1490, which he maintained, as well as nearly 30 vernacular schools of different grades; and subsidised a much larger number of educational institutions. He was also one of the founders of Indian National Congress as well as one of the main financial contributors thereto. Maharaja Lakshmeshwar Singh is known for purchasing Lowhter Castle for the venue of the 1888 Allahabad Congress session when the British denied permission to use any public place. The British Governor commissioned Edward Onslow Ford to make a statue of Lakshmeshwar Singh. This is installed at Dalhousie Square in Kolkata.

On the occasion of the Jubilee of the reign of Queen Victoria, Lakshmeshwar Singh was declared as a Knight Commander of the Most Eminent Order of the Indian Empire, and was promoted to Knight Grand Commander in 1897. He was also a member of the Royal Commission on Opium of 1895, formed by British Government along with Haridas Viharidas Desai who was the Diwan of Junagadh. The Royal Opium Commission consisted of a 9-member team of which 7 were British and 2 were Indians and its chairman was Earl Brassey.

== Geography ==
Mithila is a distinct geographical region with natural boundaries like rivers and hills. It is largely a flat and fertile alluvial plain criss-crossed by numerous rivers which originate from the Himalayas. Due to the flat plains and fertile land Mithila has a rich variety of biotic resources; however, because of frequent floods people could not take full advantage of these resources.

Seven major rivers flow through Mithila: Gandak, Kosi, Mahananda, Bagmati, Kamala, Balan, and the Budhi Gandak. They flow from the Himalayas in the north to the Ganges river in the south. These rivers regularly flood, depositing silt onto the farmlands and sometimes causing death or hardship.

== Culture ==
Men and women in Mithila are very religious and dress for the festivals as well. The costumes of Mithila stem from the rich traditional culture of Mithila. Kurta and Dhoti with a Mithila Painting bordered Maroon coloured Gamchha which is the Symbol of Passion, Love, Bravery and Courage are common clothing items for men. Men wear Gold ring in their nose which symbolizes prosperity, happiness and wealth inspired by Lord Vishnu. Also wear Balla on their wrist and Mithila Paag on their Head. In ancient times there was no colour option in Mithila, so the Maithil women wore white or yellow Saree with red Border but now they have a lot of variety and colour options and wear Laal-Paara (the traditional red-boarded white or yellow Saree) on some special occasions, and also wear Shakha-Pola with lahthi in their hand. In Mithila culture, this represents new beginnings, passion and prosperity. Red also represents the Hindu goddess Durga, a symbol of new beginnings and feminine power. During Chhaith, the women of Mithila wear pure cotton dhoti without stitching which reflects the pure, traditional Culture of Mithila. Usually crafted from pure cotton for daily use and from pure silk for more glamorous occasions, traditional attire for the women of Mithila includes Jamdani, Banarisi and Bhagalpuri and many more.

Jhijhiya and Dhuno-Naach are the Cultural Dance of Mithila. Jhijhiya is performed in Darbhanga, Muzaffarpur, Madhubani and their Neighbour Districts on the other hand Dhuno-Naach is performed in Begusarai, Khagaria, Katihar, Naugachia during Durga Puja and Kalipuja with Shankha-Dhaak Sound. Many festivals are celebrated throughout the year in Mithila. Chhaith, Durga Puja and Kali puja is celebrated as perhaps the most important of all the celebrations of Mithila.

=== Mithila Paag ===
The Paag is a headdress in the Mithila region of India and Nepal worn by Maithil people. It is a symbol of honour and respect and a significant part of Maithil culture.

The Paag dates back to pre-historic times when it was made of plant leaves. It exists today in a modified form. The Paag is wore by the whole Maithil community. The colour of the Paag also carries a lot of significance. The red Paag is worn by the bridegroom and by those who are undergoing the sacred thread rituals. Paag of mustard colour is donned by those attending wedding ceremonies and the elders wear a white Paag.

This Paag now features place in the popular Macmillan Dictionary. For now, Macmillan Dictionary explains Paag as “a kind of headwear worn by people in the Mithila belt of India.”

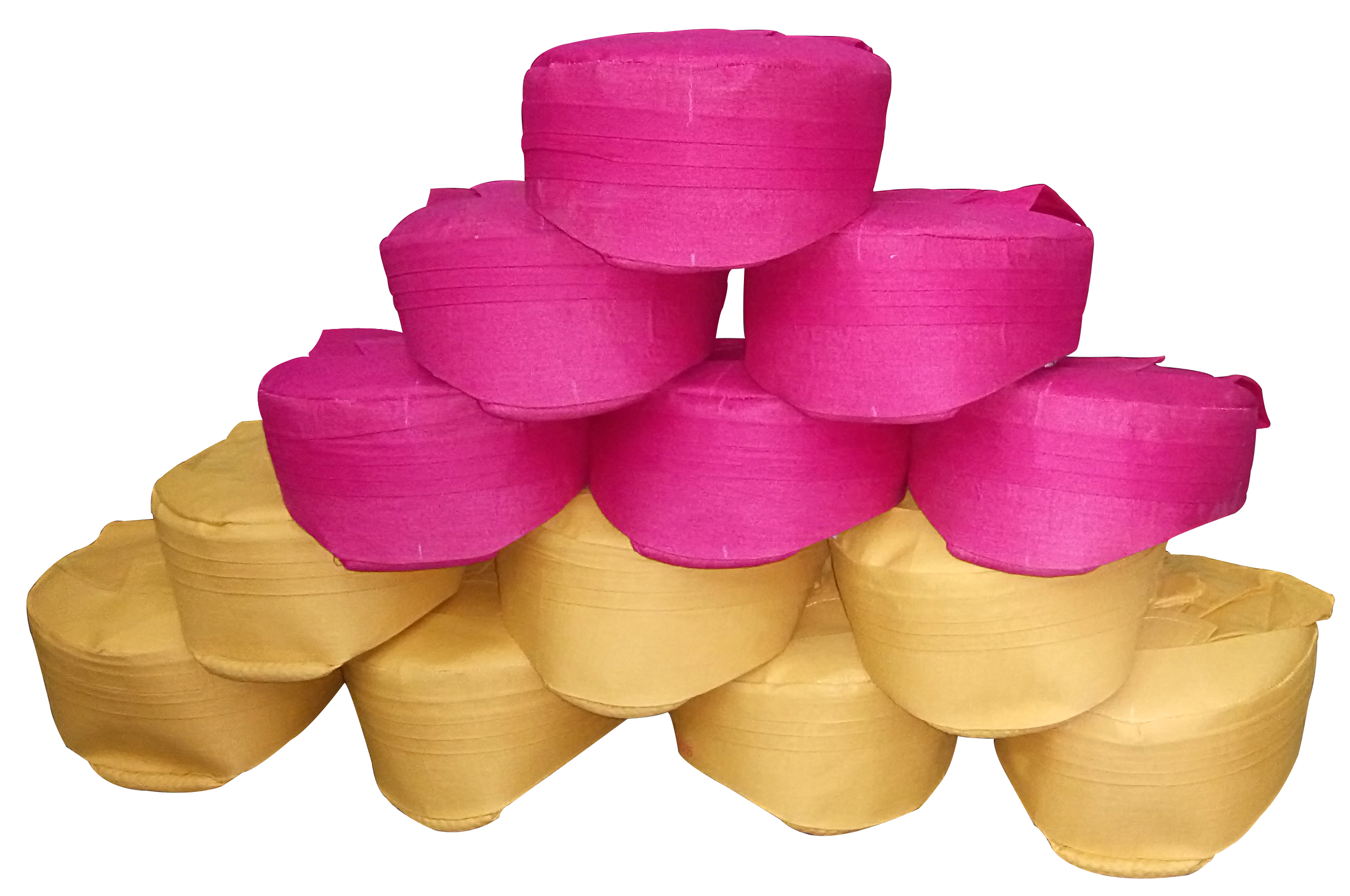
Paag

On 10 February 2017, India Posts released a set of 16 commemorative postage stamps on "Headgears of India". The Mithila Paag was featured on one of those postage stamps.

=== Languages and dialects ===
People of Mithila primarily speak in Maithili and its various dialects including Thēthi and its perceived dialects Bajjika, and Angika while also being well versed in other languages like English, Hindi and Nepali for official or administrative purposes.

This language is an Indo-Aryan language native to the Indian subcontinent, mainly spoken in India and Nepal and is one of the 22 recognised Indian languages. In Nepal, it is spoken in the eastern Terai and is the second most prevalent language of Nepal. Tirhuta is formerly the primary script for written Maithili. Less commonly, it was also written in the local variant of Kaithi. Today it is written in the Devanagari adopted script.

=== Maithil Cuisine ===
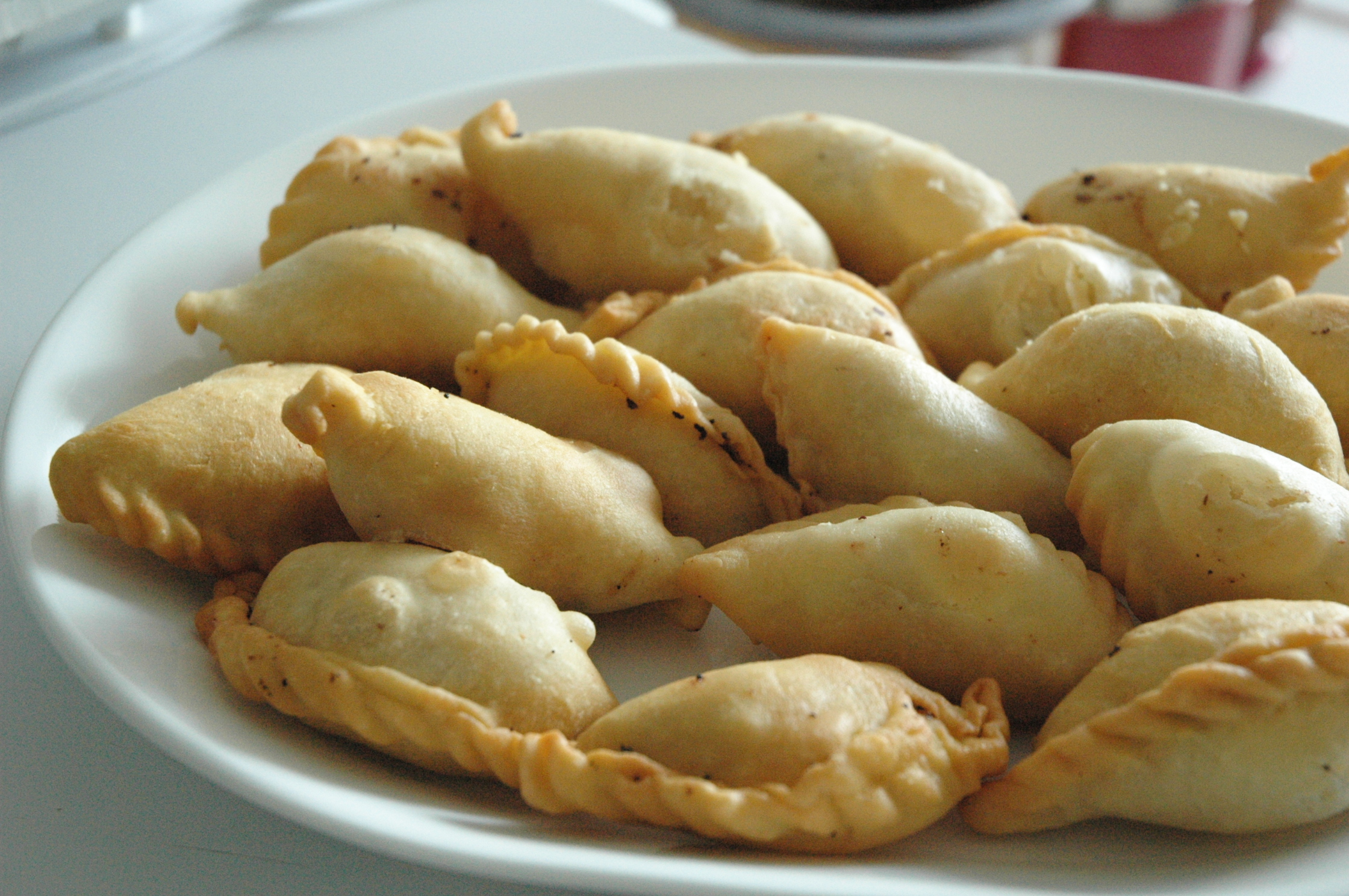
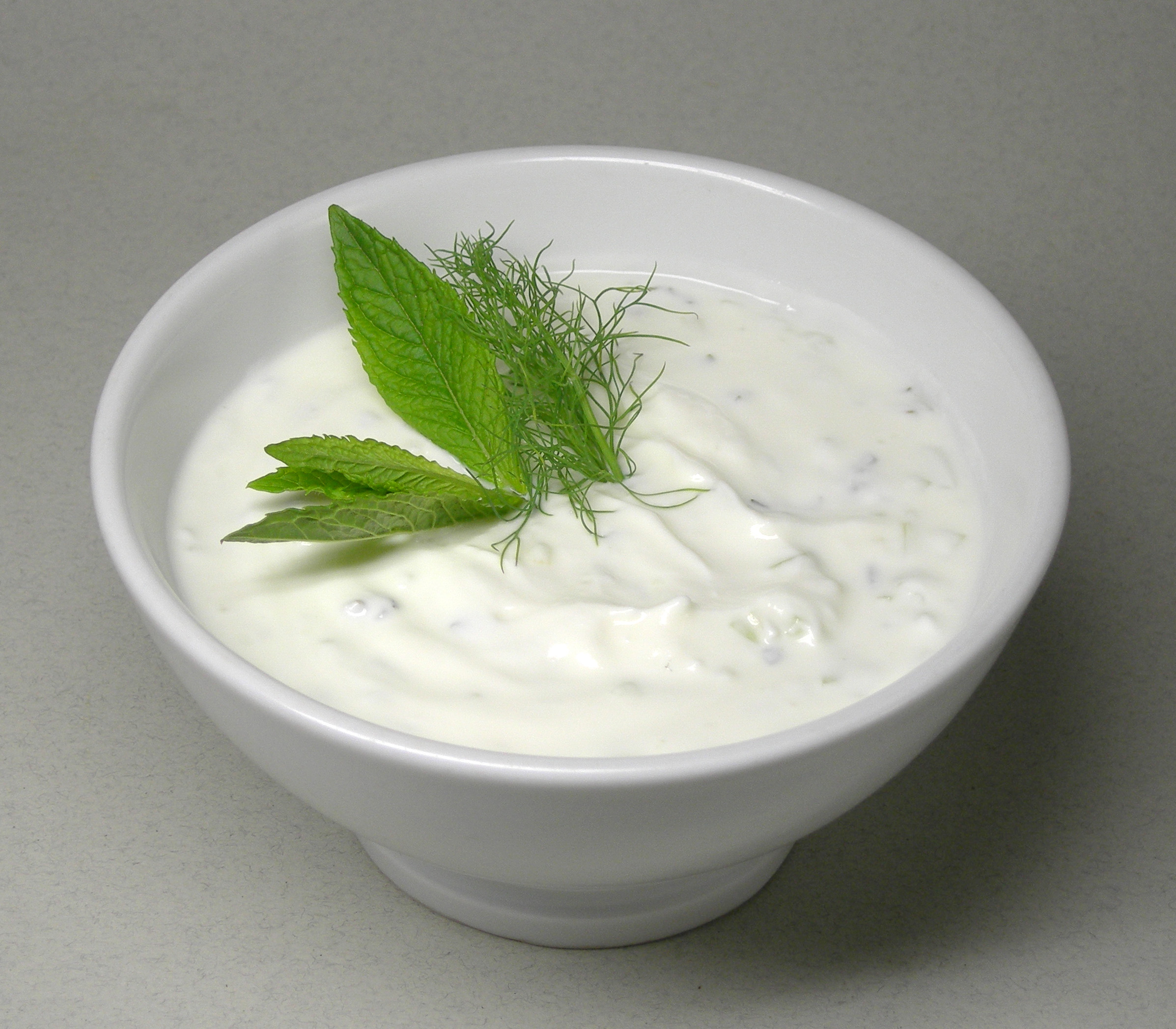
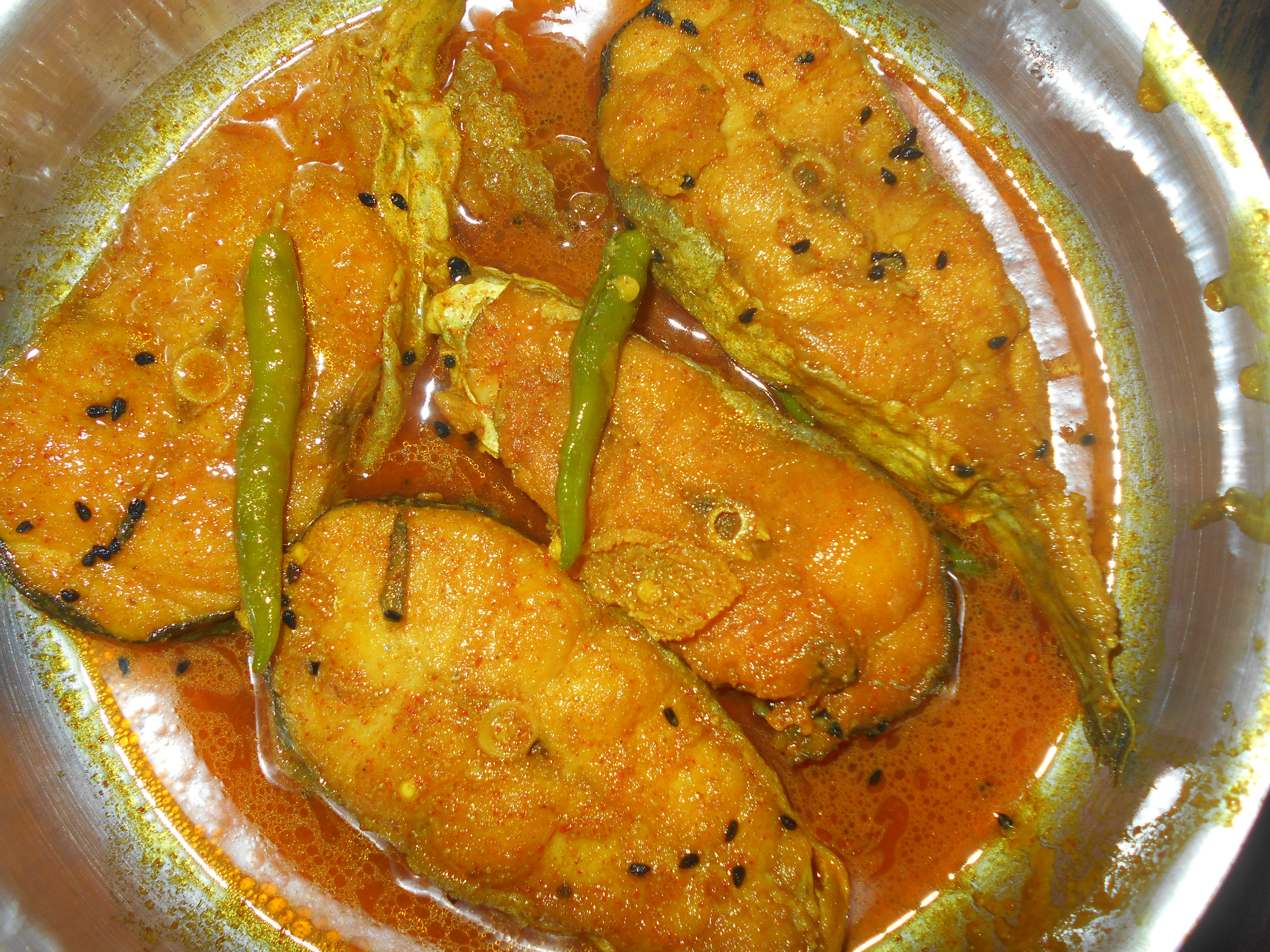
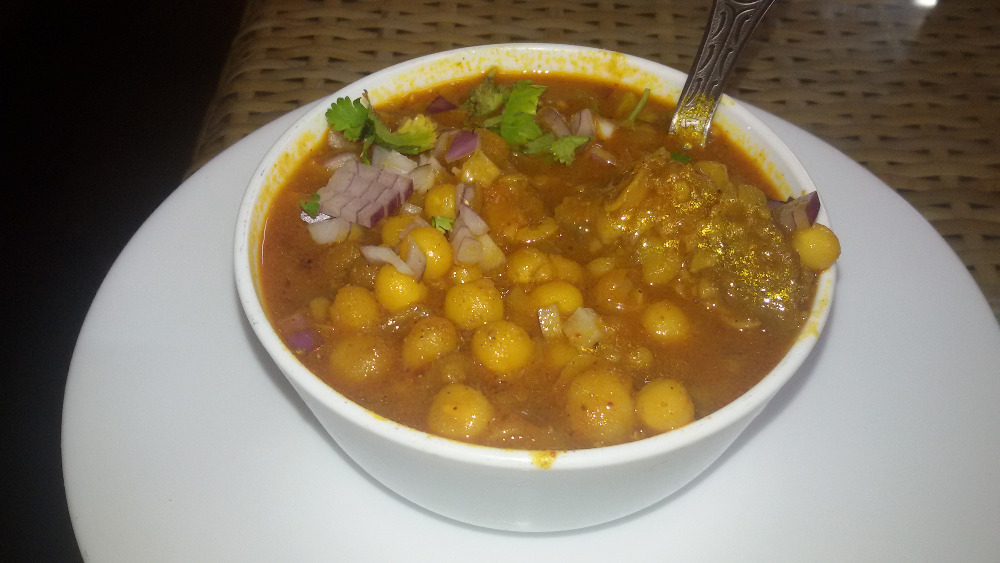
Traditional Maithil cuisine

Maithil cuisine is a part of Indian cuisine and Nepalese cuisine. It is a culinary style which originated in Mithila. Some traditional Maithil dishes are:

- Dahi-Chura
- Mithila Makhana
- Vegetable of Arikanchan
- Ghooghni
- Traditional Pickles, made of fruits and vegetables which are generally mixed with ingredients like salt, spices, and vegetable oils and are set to mature in a moistureless medium.
- Tarua of Tilkor
- Bada
- Dahi Badee
- Yogurt
- Maachh
- Mutton
- Irhar
- Pudukiya (Purukiya) which is basically dumplings.
- Makhan Payas
- Anarasa
- Bagiya

=== Madhubani Painting ===
Madhubani art or Mithila painting is practiced in the Mithila region of India and Nepal. It was traditionally created by the women of different communities of the Mithila region. It is named after Madhubani district of India which is where it originated.

This painting as a form of wall art was practiced widely throughout the region; the more recent development of painting on paper and canvas originated among the villages around Madhubani, and it is these latter developments that may correctly be referred to as Mithila Painting.

=== Yatra in Mithila ===
- Mithila Madhya Parikrama - It is a circular journey of the central part of the ancient Mithila.
- Sitamarhi Dham Parikrama - It is a Hindu religious circumambulation of the sacred religious destinations around the region of Sitamarhi Dham in Mithila. It is associated with the birth anniversary known as Janaki Navami of Goddess Sita in Mithila.
- Ram Baraat Yatra - an annual Hindu pilgrimage ( procession of Ram Baraat) from Ayodhya and other cities to the city of Janakpur in the Mithila region during the festival of Vivah Panchami.

== Main festivals ==
- Indra Puja - Indra Puja is a festival celebrated in Mithila and only place where indra is worshipped, festival that honors Lord Indra and his wife Shachi. It is celebrated to ensure a good harvest season.
- Saama-Chakeba: includes folk theater and song, celebrates the love between brothers and sisters and is based on a legend recounted in the Puranas.
- Jur Sital - Jur Sital or Maithil New Year is the celebration of the first day of the Maithil new year
- Chaurchan: Along with Lord Ganesha, Lord Vishnu, Goddess Parvati and the moon god is worshipped. The story of Chorchan Puja is also heard on this day after that arghya is offered to the moon god (Chandra Deva).
- Madhushravani - It is a Hindu festival celebrated in Mithila by newly married Maithil Brahmin and Maithil Kayastha women
- Vivaha Panchami: Hindu festival celebrating the wedding of Rama and Sita. It is observed on the fifth day of the Shukla paksha or waxing phase of moon in the Agrahayana month (November – December) as per Maithili calendar and in the month of Margashirsha in the Hindu calendar.
- Sita Navami - festival that celebrates the birth of Goddess Sita the daughter of mithila in Janakpur dham
- Ganga Dussehra: Ganga Dussehra, also known as Gangavataran, is a Hindu festival celebrated by Maithils in Mokshdhaam Simaria Dhaam (The Welcome Gate of Mithila). avatarana (descent) of the Ganges. It is believed by Hindus that the holy river Ganges descended from heaven to earth on this day.
- Kalpwas: Celebrated every in the Kartik month at Simaria Ghat in Simaria Dhaam, Begusarai.
- Kojagra (Lachhmi Puja): harvest festival marking the end of monsoon season
- Paata Puja (Durga Maay Aagmon)
- Khutti Puja (Ritual of Durga Puja)
- Mohalaya
- Durga Puja: a ten-day festival, of which the last five are of the most significance. is an important festival in the Shaktism tradition of Hinduism.It marks the victory of goddess Durga in her battle against the shape-shifting asura, Mahishasura. (Note: In the Shakta tradition of Hinduism, many of the stories about obstacles and battles have been considered as metaphors for the divine and demonic within each human being, with liberation being the state of self-understanding whereby a virtuous nature & society emerging victorious over the vicious.) Thus, the festival epitomizes the victory of good over evil, though it is also in part a harvest festival celebrating the goddess as the motherly power behind all of life and creation.
- Jatara Parva: traditionally celebrated on the day of Vijayadashami (Dussehra)
- Kali Puja: dedicated to the Hindu goddess Kali, celebrated on the new moon day Dipannita Amavasya of the Hindu month Kartik
- Saraswati Puja: marks the preparation for the arrival of spring. The festival is celebrated by people of Dharmic religions in the South Asian countries in different ways depending on the region. Vasant Panchami also marks the start of preparation for Holika and Holi, which take place forty days later.
- Rama Navami: celebrates the descent of Vishnu as the Rama avatar, through his birth to King Dasharatha and Queen Kausalya in Ayodhya, Kosala.
- Basanti Puja (Chaiti Durga Puja)
- Til Sakraait
- Aakhar Bochhor
- Naag Panchami
- Barsaait
- Vishwakarma Puja
- Holi
- Raib Parva
- Mithila Jhulnotsav - A fifteen-day annual festival of Jhulan dedicated to Lord Rama and Goddess Sita.

== People ==
Maithili language speakers are referred to as Maithils and they are an Indo-Aryan ethno-linguistic group. There are an estimated 75 million Maithils in India alone. The vast majority of them are Hindu.

The people of Mithila can be split into various caste/clan affiliations such as Maithil Brahmins, Maithil Kayasthas, Kanu, Kewats, Rajputs, Kushwahas, Baniyas, Kamatas, Ahirs, Kurmis, Dushads, Kujras, Manush and many more.

== Demands for administrative units ==
=== Proposed Indian state ===
There is an ongoing movement in the Maithili speaking region of India for a separate Indian state of Mithila.

=== Proposed Nepalese province ===
There was a movement in the Maithili speaking areas of Nepal for a separate province. Province No. 2 was established under the 2015 Constitution, which transformed Nepal into a Federal Democratic Republic, with a total of seven provinces. Province No. 2 has a substantial Maithili speaking population and consists most of the Maithili speaking areas of Nepal. It was demanded by some Mithila activists that Province No. 2 be named 'Mithila Province'. On 23 December 2021, four different names for the Province No. 2 were presented by the various parties of the Provincial Assembly of Madhesh Province. The four names were ‘Madhesh Pradesh’, ‘Janaki Pradesh’, ‘Madhya Madhesh Pradesh’ and ‘Mithila Bhojpura’.

Among the four names, Madhesh Pradesh (Madhesh Province) was chosen and finalized on 17 January 2022. The name was finalized with 80 percent majority in the Provincial Assembly. Janakpur was named as the capital of the province.

== Notable people ==
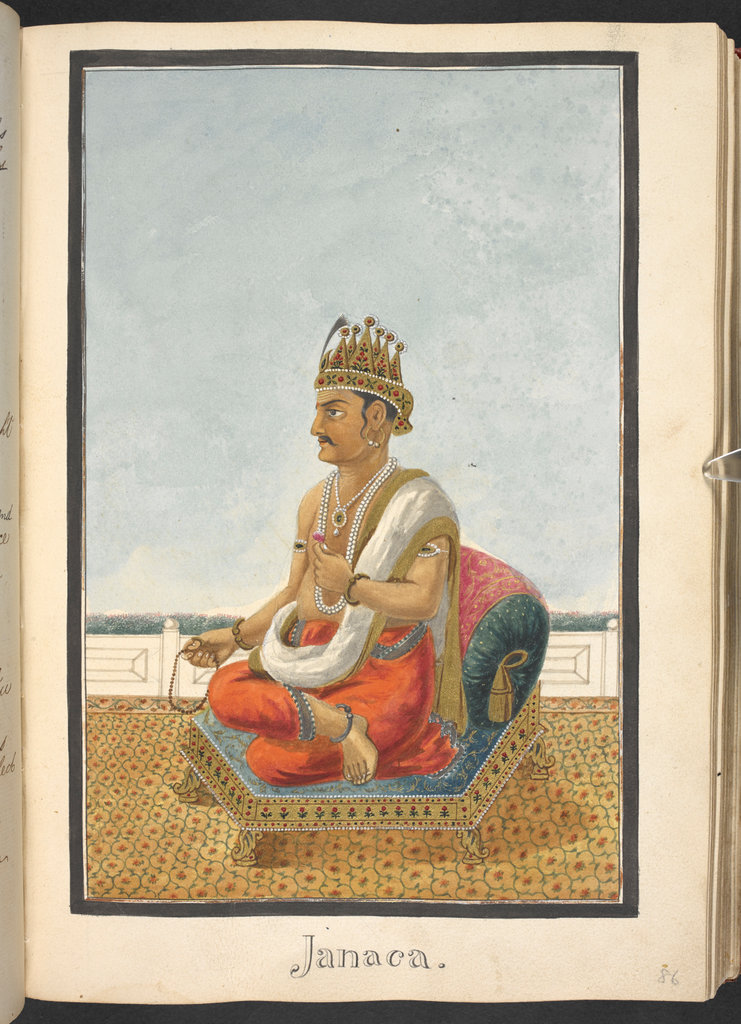
Janaka, king of Mithila and father of Sita maa

The following are notable residents (past and present) of Mithila region.

=== Ancient ===
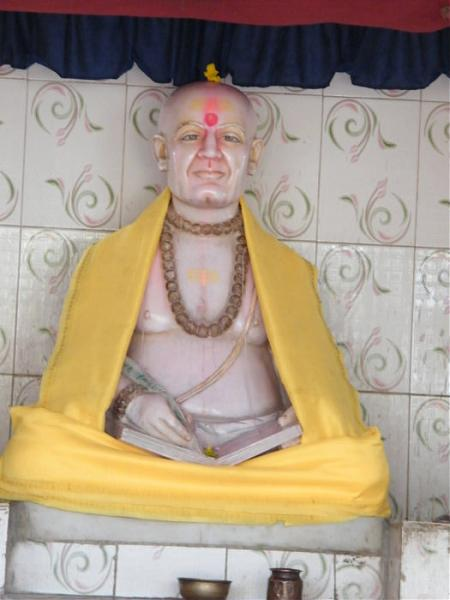
Statue of the 11th century philosopher Udayana

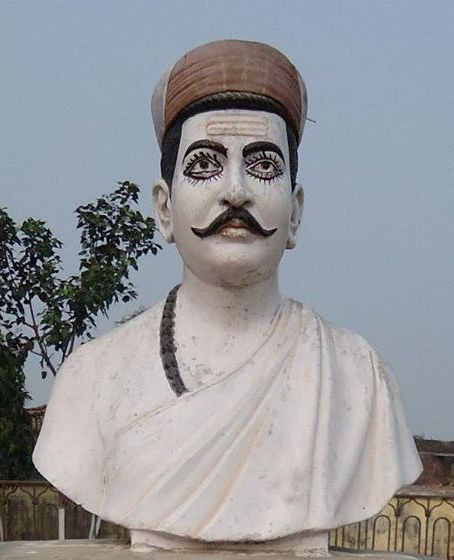
Statue of Maithili language poet, Vidyapati

- Janaka, King of Mithila and Father in Law of King Rama
- Sita, Princess of Mithila Kingdom and wife of King Rama
- Shrutadeva, a notable devotee of Lord Krishna during the regime of Bahulashva Janaka
- Sulabha, female scholar during the period of Dharmadhwaja Janaka.
- Yajnavalkya, founder of Shukla Yajurveda and Shatapatha Brahmana
- Akshapada Gautama, founder of Nyaya school of Indian Philosophy
- Gargi Vachaknavi, female scholar of Vedas
- Kapila, founder of Samkhya Philosophy

=== Historical ===
- Udayanacharya, 10th/11th-century philosopher and logician of the Nyaya school.
- Mandana Mishra, scholar of Mimansa
- Ayachi Mishra, scholar Nyaya Shastra
- Vidyapati, 14th/15th century Maithili and Sanskrit poet-saint
- Shivasimha - popular king of Oiniwar Dynasty in Mithila
- Puraditya - King of the Raj Banauli in the Dronwar Dynasty of Mithila
- Lakhimadevi - queen of Shivasimha and woman ruler of Mithila, scholar and poetess
- Vishwasa Devi - woman ruler of Oiniwar Dynasty in Mithila and scholar of Sanskrit literature
- Bhanudatta Misra, 15th/16th-century Sanskrit poet from Mithila
- Harisimhadeva, King of Mithila during the Karnat dynasty from 1304 - 1324 CE
- Gangadeva, King of Mithila during the Karnat dynasty from 1147-1187 CE
- Narsimhadeva, King of Mithila during the Karnat dynasty from 1174-1227 CE
- Ramasimhadeva, King of Mithila during the Karnat dynasty from 1227-1285 CE
- Jyotirishwar Thakur, 14th-century poet, playwright and musician who composed the earliest prose work in the Maithili language, the Varna Ratnakara
- Caṇḍeśvara Ṭhakkura, political theorist and general from the 14th century
- Gaṅgeśa, 13th/14th century philosopher, logician and mathematician and author of Tattavachintamani
- Pakshadhara Mishra, 15th-century philosopher
- Vāchaspati Misra, 9th/10th-century philosopher of the Advaita Vedanta tradition
- Lakshmeshwar Singh, zamindar and principal landowner of Raj Darbhanga, 1860–1898
- Rameshwar Singh, zamindar and principal landowner of Raj Darbhanga, 1898–1929

=== Modern ===
- Amit Kumar Das, founder of Moti Babu Institute of Technology, President of the Sydney Bihar Foundation, software entrepreneur and multinational CEO
- Amitabh Singh, Indian Space Scientist at ISRO
- Y P Viyogi, Indian Nuclear Physicist and associated with ALICE Experiment at CERN
- Maghfoor Ahmad Ajazi, Indian Freedom fighter, political activist, social worker, poet and writer, born in Muzaffarpur
- H C Verma, Indian physicist and author of the popular book Concept of Physics
- Ram Narayan Mishra, The Plenipotentiary for Treaty of trade and transit between the Government of India and His Majesty's Government of Nepal in 1960, Nepalese political leader, democratic freedom fighter in Nepal, a founder member of Nepali Congress Party.
- Bimalendra Nidhi, Member of Nepalese parliament, Vice president of ruling party Nepali Congress and former Deputy Prime Minister of Nepal.
- Ramdhari Singh 'Dinkar' was an Indian Hindi poet, essayist, patriot and academic.
- Bindheshwari Prasad Mandal was an Indian parliamentarian and social reformer who served as the chairman of the Second Backward Classes Commission (popularly known as the Mandal Commission).
- C. K. Raut, formerly US-based computer scientist, author and political leader of Nepal.
- C. K. Lal, Nepalese journalist and writer from Mahottari District of Nepal.
- Phanishwar Nath 'Renu', influential writer of modern Hindi literature in the post-Premchand era.
- Gopal Jee Thakur, Indian Politician and Member of Parliament from Darbhanga Lok Sabha Constituency.
- Syed Shahnawaz Hussain, Indian politician, born in Supaul
- Bhagwat Jha Azad was the Chief Minister of Bihar and a member of Lok Sabha.
- Maithili Thakur, Indian singer
- Ram Baran Yadav, First president of Nepal
- Ramdev Mahato, three time Member of Bihar Legislative Assembly from Madhubani Assembly constituency of Mithila region.
- Sharda Sinha, Indian folk singer
- Udit Narayan, Bollywood playback singer
- Narendra Jha, Bollywood actor
- Sriti Jha, Indian television actress
- Kirti Azad, former Indian cricketer and politician
- Sanjay Mishra, Bollywood actor
- Bhawana Kanth, one of the first female fighter pilots of India
- Vikas Kumar Jha
- George Orwell, novelist and essayist, journalist and critic
- Rambriksh Benipuri, Indian freedom fighter, Socialist Leader, editor and Hindi writer
- Devaki Nandan Khatri, Indian writer
- Ganganath Jha, Indian scholar
- Ramjee Singh, former Member of Indian parliament and vice-chancellor of Jain Vishva Bharati University
- Acharya Ramlochan Saran, Hindi literature, grammarian and publisher
- Ramesh Chandra Jha, Indian poet, novelist and freedom fighter
- Acharya Rameshwar Jha, scholar
- Ravindra Prabhat a Hindi novelist, journalist, poet, and short story writer
- Gajendra Thakur, Literary critic, historian, novelist, dramatist, poet, and a lexicographer
- Anerood Jugnauth, former President of Mauritius
- Parmanand Jha, first vice-president of Nepal
- Dhirendra Premarshi, presenter of Hello Mithila on Radio Kantipur
- Godawari Dutta, madhubani artist, social activist
- Tarkishore Prasad, Deputy Chief Minister of Bihar, born in Saharsa district
- Ramnath Goenka, Indian journalist, born in Darbhanga
- Ashish Jha, general internist physician and academic serving the White House Coronavirus Response Coordinator
- Vartika Jha (born 2000), Indian dancer, choreographer and actress
- Lalit Narayan Mishra, Leader of Congress
- Jagannath Mishra, Leader of Congress
- Pushpam Priya Choudhary, Founder of The Plurals Party
- Nitish Mishra, Leader of BJP
- Sanjay Kumar Jha, Leader of JD(U)
- Vaibhav Sooryavanshi, Indian Cricket Player

== See also ==
- Mithila (proposed Indian state)
- Mithila Painting
- Mithila Makhana
- Mithilā (ancient city)
- Jhijhiya
- Mithila Student Union
- Maithili duck
- King Mithi
- Gosaunik Ghar
- Industrial ruins in Mithila region
- Maithili Cinema
- Tourism in Mithila
- Rajarshi Janak Mandir
- Maharani Sthan
- Gautam Kund
- Mithila tradition of Durga Puja

== Bibliography ==
- Daniélou, Alain (1991). The Myths and Gods of India: The Classic Work on Hindu Polytheism from the Princeton Bollingen Series. Inner Traditions / Bear & Co. ISBN 978-0-89281-354-4.
- Doniger, Wendy (1999). Merriam-Webster's Encyclopedia of World Religions. Merriam-Webster. ISBN 978-0-87779-044-0.
- Donner, Henrike (2016). Domestic Goddesses: Maternity, Globalization and Middle-class Identity in Contemporary India. Routledge. ISBN 978-1-317-14848-7.
- Foulston, Lynn; Abbott, Stuart (2009). Hindu Goddesses: Beliefs and Practices. Sussex Academic Press. ISBN 978-1-902210-43-8.
- Kinsley, David (1988). Hindu Goddesses: Visions of the Divine Feminine in the Hindu Religious Tradition. University of California Press. ISBN 978-0-520-90883-3.
- Lochtefeld, James G (2002). The Illustrated Encyclopedia of Hinduism: A-M. The Rosen Publishing Group. ISBN 978-0-8239-3179-8.
- McDaniel, June (2004). Offering Flowers, Feeding Skulls: Popular Goddess Worship in West Bengal. Oxford University Press. ISBN 978-0-19-534713-5.
- McDermott, Rachel Fell (2001). Mother of My Heart, Daughter of My Dreams: Kali and Uma in the Devotional Poetry of Bengal. Oxford University Press. ISBN 978-0-19-803071-3.
- Rodrigues, Hillary (2003). Ritual Worship of the Great Goddess: The Liturgy of the Durga Puja with Interpretations. SUNY Press. ISBN 978-0-7914-8844-7.
