= Durga Puja =

Annual Hindu festival

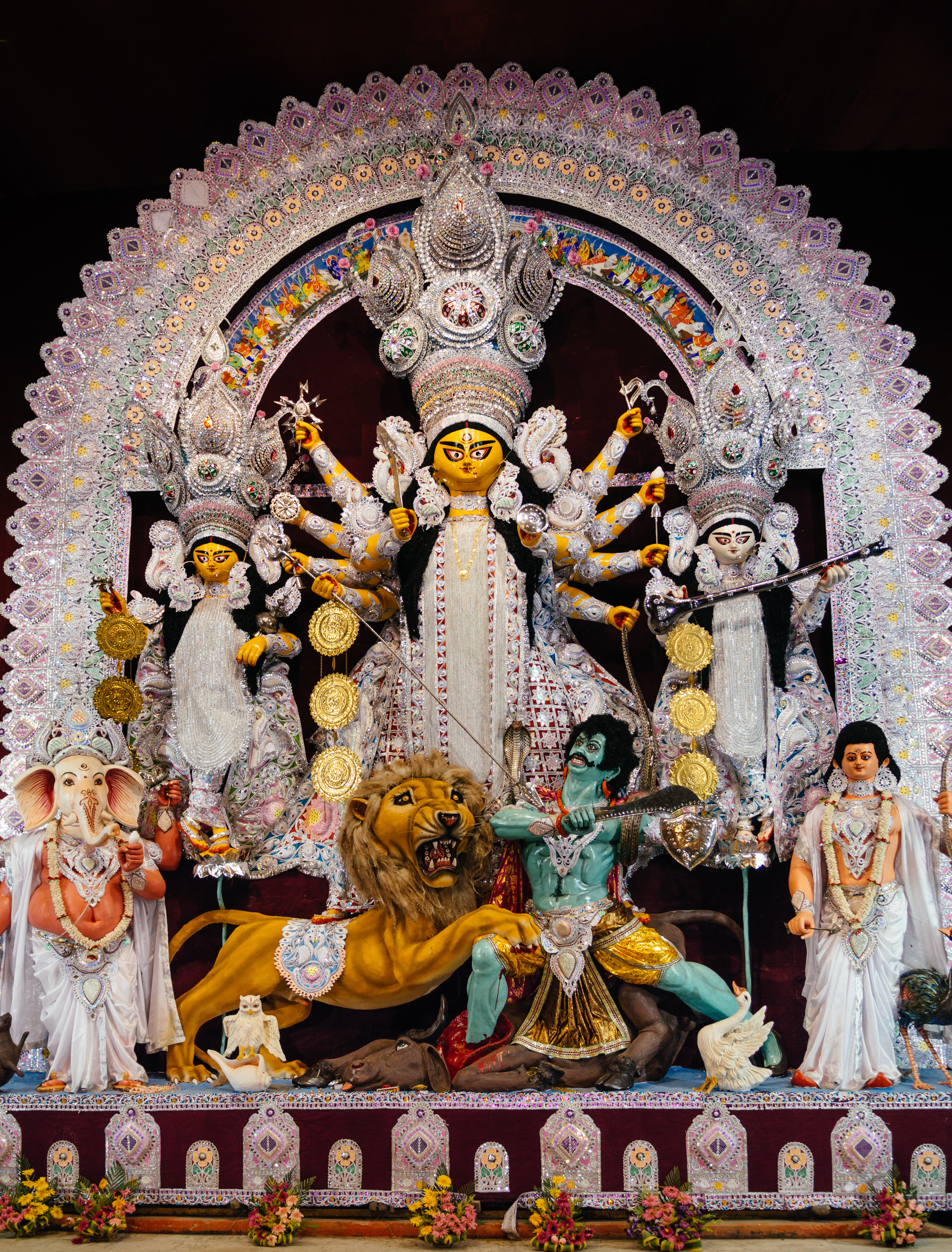
- Devi Durga killing Mahishasura with her trishula riding her vahana (mount), the lion. Lakshmi and Ganesha flank the left while Saraswati and Kartikeya flank the right.
- Nickname: Durgotsava, Sharadotsava
- Status: Public holiday in Indian states of West Bengal, Odisha, Tripura, Bihar, Assam and in the countries Bangladesh and Nepal; Optional holiday in Pakistan
- Genre: Religious and cultural festival
- Date: 16 October to 21 October 2026 (Dates vary annually per the Hindu lunisolar calendar)
- Begins: Mahalaya
- Ends: Vijaya Dashami
- Frequency: Annual
- Founders: Rama, according to the legends
- Participants: Mainly Eastern, Northeast India and Hindus in Bangladesh and Nepal
- Major events: Worshipping Hindu deities, family and other social gatherings, shopping and gift-giving, feasting, pandal visiting, and cultural events
- Main observation: Ceremonial worship of Goddess Durga to honor her victory over Mahishasura

Explanatory note on Hindu festival dates
- The Hindu calendar is lunisolar but most festival dates are specified using the lunar portion of the calendar. A lunar day is uniquely identified by three calendar elements: māsa (lunar month), pakṣa (lunar fortnight) and tithi (lunar day). Furthermore, when specifying the masa, one of two traditions are applicable, viz. amānta / pūrṇimānta. If a festival falls in the waning phase of the moon, these two traditions identify the same lunar day as falling in two different (but successive) masa. A lunar year is shorter than a solar year by about eleven days. As a result, most Hindu festivals occur on different days in successive years on the Gregorian calendar.

Durga Puja (ISO: Durgā Pūjā, Assamese pronunciation: [duɹɡäpuzä], Bengali pronunciation: [d̪uɾɡapud͡ʒa]), is a major Hindu festival honouring the goddess Durga and commemorating her victory over Mahishasura. It is one of the biggest festivals among Assamese, Bengali Hindus, Maithils, Odias and other communities in eastern India, Bangladesh and Nepal. In 2021, Durga Puja in Kolkata was inscribed on UNESCO's Representative List of the Intangible Cultural Heritage of Humanity.

The festival is observed in the Indian calendar in the month of Ashvin (September–October) on the Hindu luni-solar calendar. It lasts ten days, with the final five being most prominent. Even though Durga Puja and Navaratri are both dedicated to the Hindu goddess Durga and are observed simultaneously, they are not the same festival.

The puja is performed in homes and public spaces with temporary structures (known as pandals), religious recitations, cultural performances, visiting, feasting, and processions; it is central to the Shaktism tradition.

In Shakta theology and Puranic scriptures, particularly the Devi Mahatmya, the festival marks Durga's annihilation of the demon Mahishasura, signifying the preservation of Dharma and the cosmic supremacy of the feminine divine Shakti. The ritual cycles also incorporate seasonal and vegetative elements, notably through the consecration of Navapatrika. Durga Puja coincides with Navaratri and Dussehra celebrations observed by other traditions of Hinduism.

Alongside Durga, devotees commonly venerate Lakshmi, Saraswati, Ganesha and Kartikeya in West Bengal. Major public celebrations run from Mahalaya to Vijayadashami and conclude with immersion of the images; practices vary by region.

Durga Puja is an old tradition with medieval textual references on Shaktism and detailed manuals from at least the 14th century; elite and community forms expanded under early modern and colonial patronage.

== Names ==
In West Bengal, Odisha, Assam, Jharkhand and Tripura, Durga Puja is also called Akalbodhan (literally, "untimely awakening of Durga"), Sharadiya pujo or puja ("autumnal worship"), Sharodotsab ("festival of autumn"), Maha pujo ("grand puja"), Maayer pujo ("worship of the Mother"), Durga pujo, or merely Puja (in Odisha and Bihar) or Pujo. In Bangladesh, Durga Puja has historically been celebrated as Bhagabati puja. Maa Durga is known as the Goddess of Power (feminine) which represents triumph of Goodness over evil.

Durga Puja is also referred to by the names of related Shakta Hindu festivals such as Navaratri, celebrated on the same days elsewhere in India; such as in Odisha, Bihar, Jharkhand, Gujarat, Uttar Pradesh, Punjab, Kerala, and Maharashtra; (Note: Navratri Puja, Durga-puja.org) Kullu Dussehra, celebrated in Kullu Valley, Himachal Pradesh; (Note: Kullu Dussehra, Durga-puja.org) Mysore Dasara celebrated in Mysore, Karnataka; (Note: Mysore Dussehra, Durga-puja.org) Bommai Golu, celebrated in Tamil Nadu; Bommala Koluvu, celebrated in Andhra Pradesh; (Note: "Bommai-kolu", Durga-puja.org) and Bathukamma, celebrated in Telangana.

== History and origins ==
Durga is an ancient goddess of Hinduism according to available archeological and textual evidence. However, the origins of Durga Puja are unclear and undocumented. Fine stone and metal carvings of Mahishasuramardini (Goddess Durga slaying Mahishasura) from the 12th century (Pala-Sena period) show that the iconography of the goddess was well-established and deeply revered at the time.

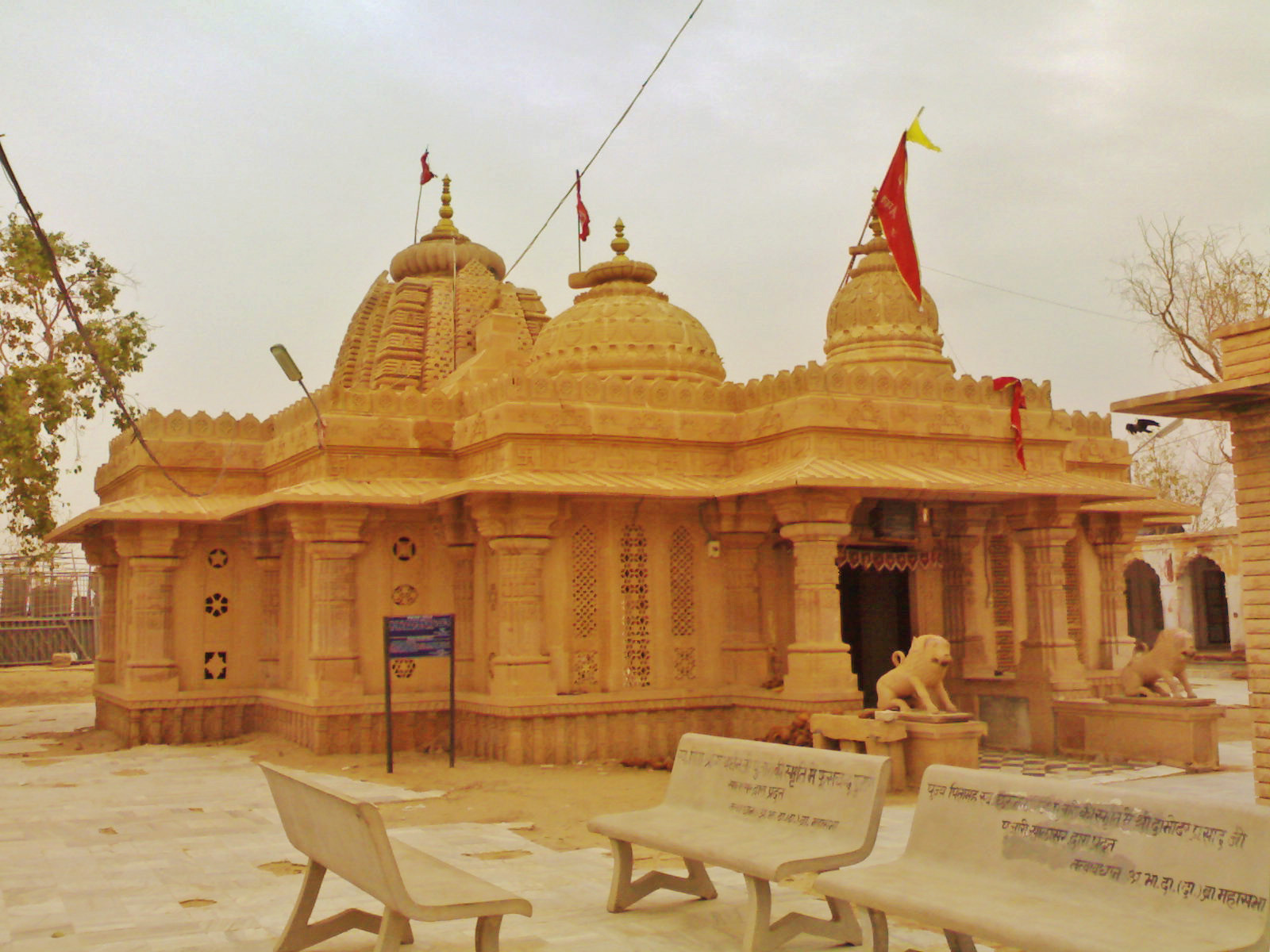
The Dadhimati Mata Temple of Rajasthan preserves a Durga-related inscription from chapter 10 of Devi Mahatmya. The temple inscription has been dated by modern methods to 608 CE.

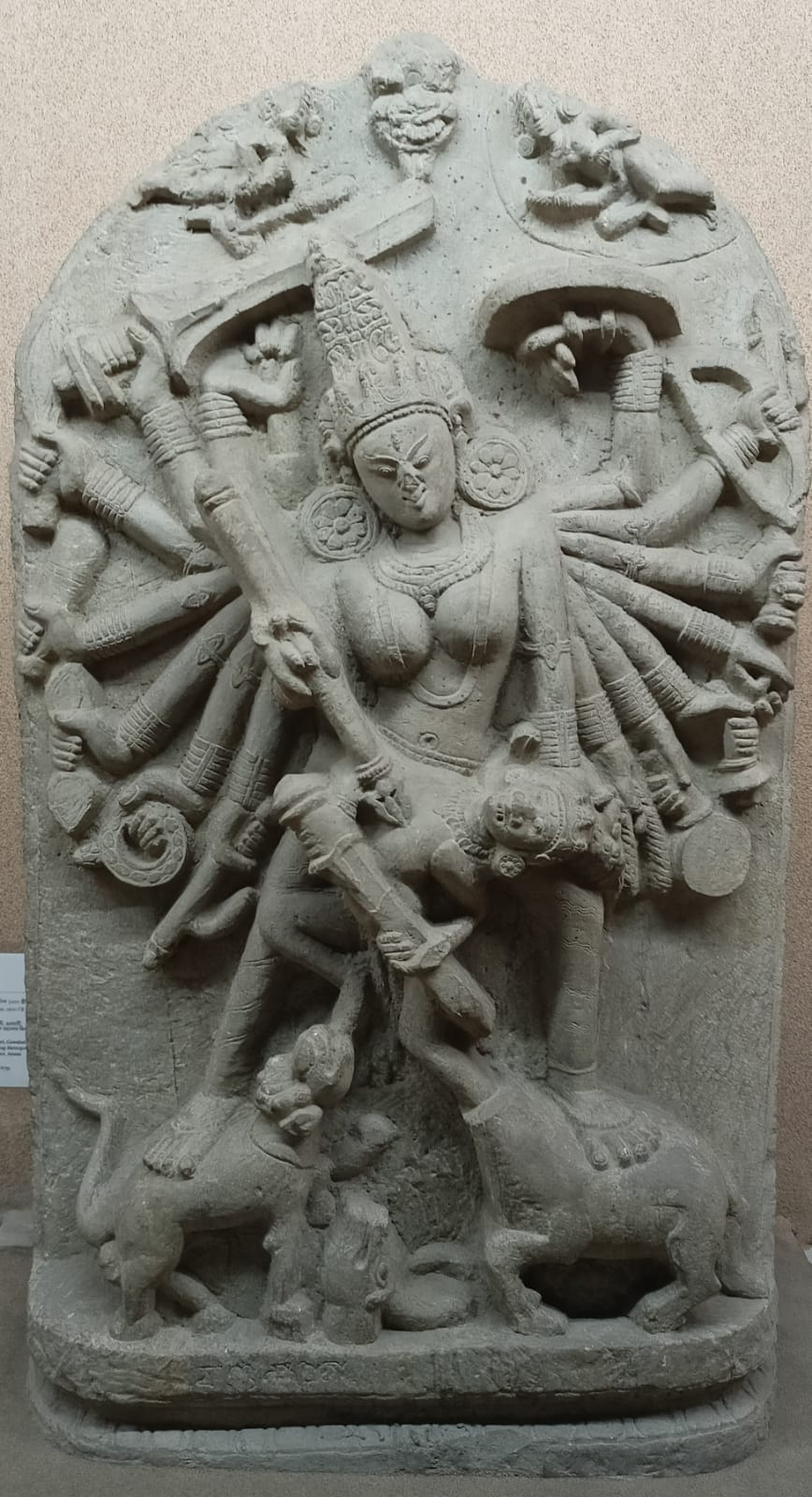
13th–14th century Durga statue from Ambari, Guwahati, Assam.

The name Durga, and related terms, appear in Vedic literature, such as in the Rigveda hymns 4.28, 5.34, 8.27, 8.47, 8.93 and 10.127, and in sections 10.1 and 12.4 of the Atharvaveda. (Note: Example Sanskrit original: "अहन्निन्द्रो अदहदग्निरिन्दो पुरा दस्यून्मध्यंदिनादभीके । दुर्गे दुरोणे क्रत्वा न यातां पुरू सहस्रा शर्वा नि बर्हीत्॥३॥ – Rigveda 4.28.8, Wikisource It appears in Khila (appendix, supplementary) text to Rigveda 10.127, 4th Adhyaya, per J. Scheftelowitz.) A deity named Durgi appears in section 10.1.7 of the Taittiriya Aranyaka. While the Vedic literature uses the word Durga, the description therein lacks legendary details about her or about Durga Puja that is found in later Hindu literature.

A key text associated with Durga Puja is Devi Mahatmya, which is recited during the festival. Durga was likely a well-established deity by the time this Hindu text was composed, which scholars estimate to date between 400 and 600 CE. The Devi Mahatmya scripture describes the nature of evil forces symbolised by Mahishasura as shape-shifting, deceptive, and adapting in nature, in form and in strategy to create difficulties and thus achieve their evil ends. Durga calmly understands and counters the evil in order to achieve her solemn goals. (Note: In the Shakta tradition of Hinduism, many of the stories about obstacles and battles have been considered as metaphors for the divine and demonic within each human being, with liberation being the state of self-understanding whereby a virtuous nature and society emerging victorious over the vicious.) Durga, in her various forms, appears as an independent deity in the Indian texts.

In the Mahabharata, both Yudhisthira and Arjuna invoke hymns to Durga. She appears in Harivamsa in the form of Vishnu's eulogy and in Pradyumna's prayer. The prominent mention of Durga in such epics may have led to her worship.

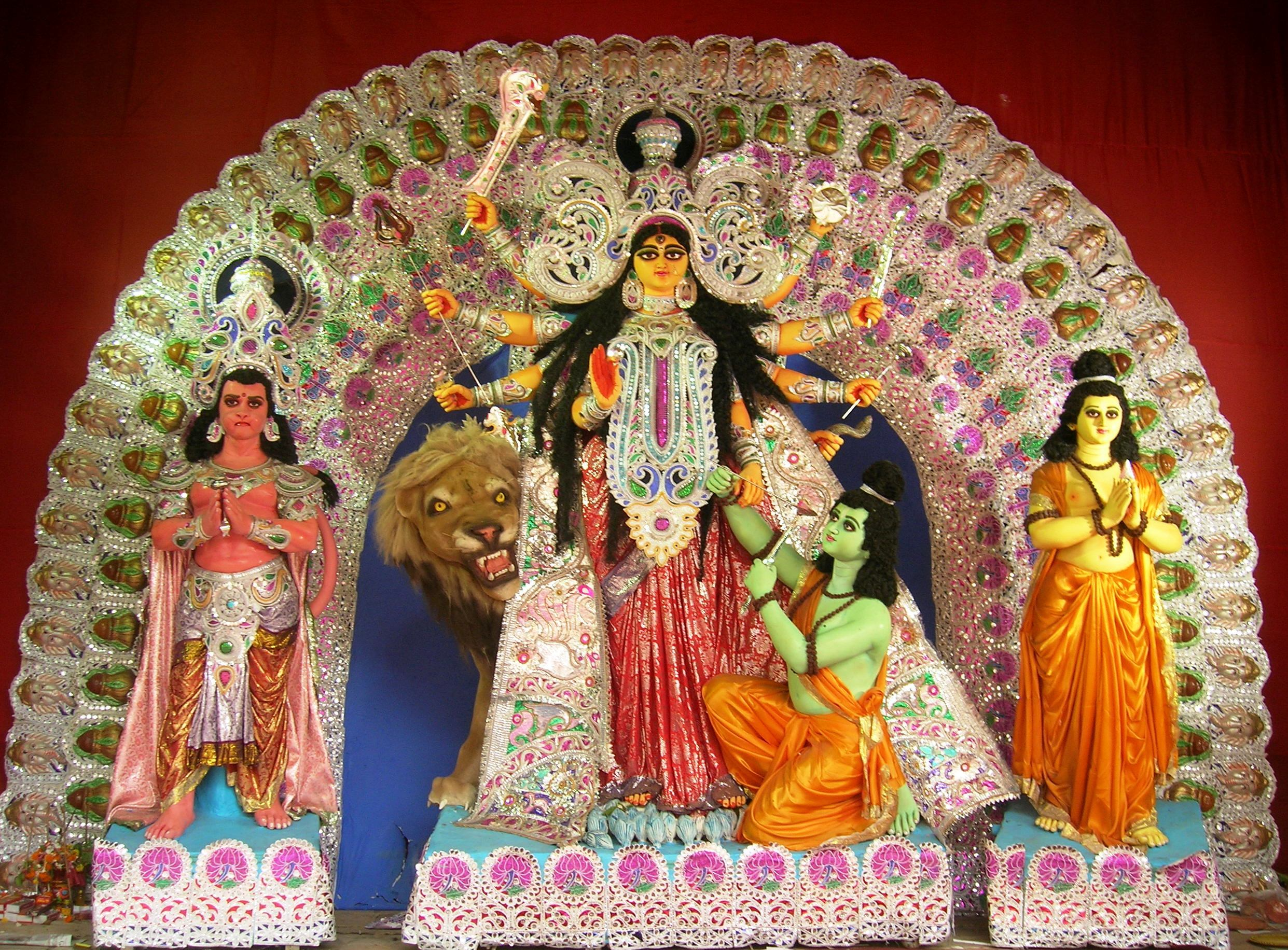
A display of sculpture-idols depicting Rāma and Lakṣmaṇa praying to the goddess Durgā

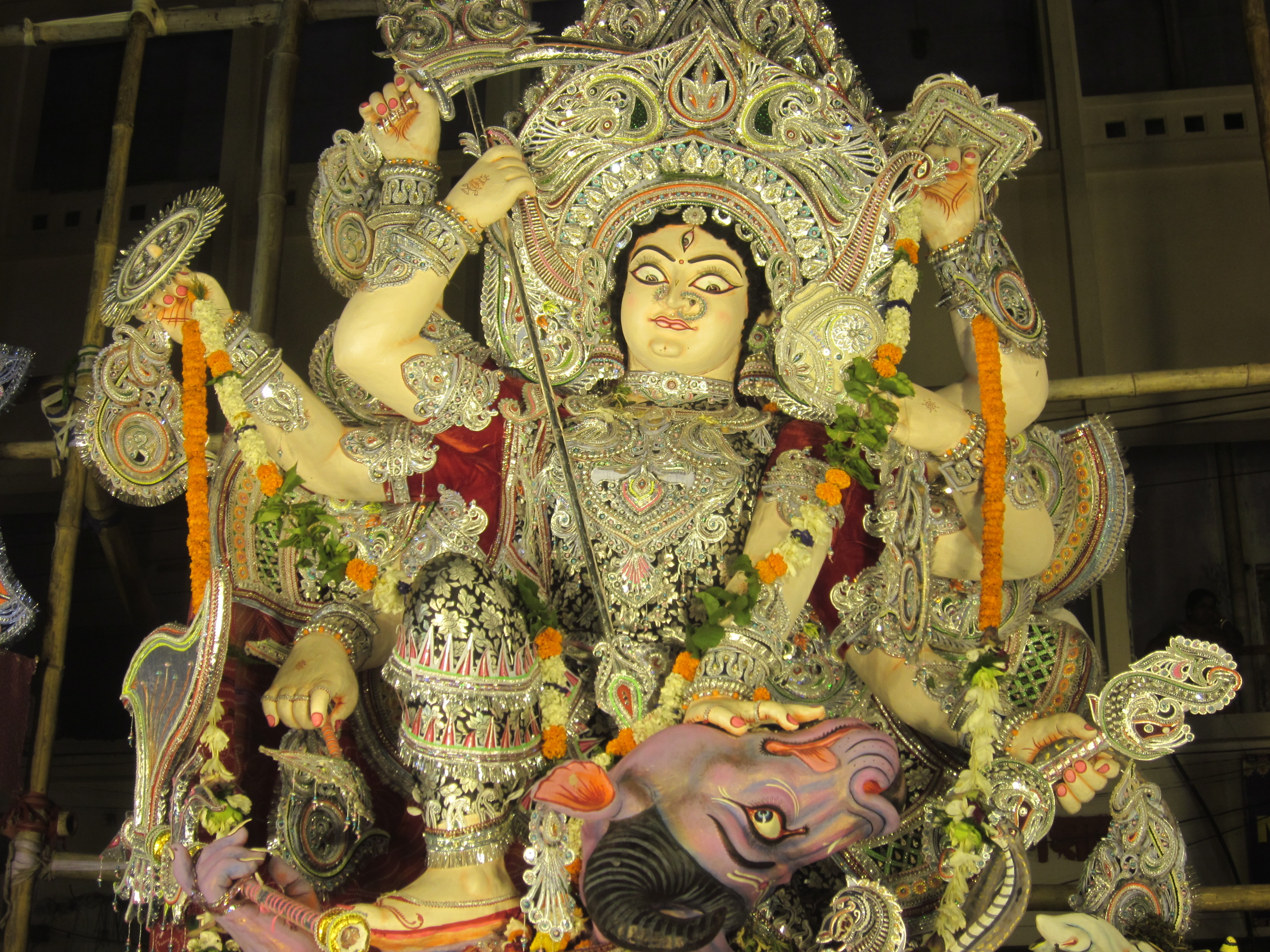
Maa Durga Rudra Roop at Gosani Jatra Puri

Some versions of the Puranas mention Durga Puja to be a spring festival - observed as Chaitra Navaratri across other traditions and celebrated as Basanti Puja ("Basant" meaning spring) in Bengal, believed to be the actual time for Durga Puja.

According to Devi-Bhagavata Purana and two other Shakta Puranas mentions it to be an autumn festival. The Ramayana manuscripts are also inconsistent. Versions of the Ramayana found in the north, west, and south of the Indian subcontinent describe Rama to be remembering Surya (the Hindu sun god) before his battle against Ravana, but the Bengali manuscripts of Ramayana, such as the Krittivasi Ramayana, a 15th-century manuscript by Krittivasa, mention Rama to be worshipping Durga. As per the legend, Rama worshipped Durga in the autumn to have her blessings before defeating Ravana. While he was preparing for the worship of the goddess, Durga hid one of the 108 flowers of lotus, very essential for her worship. Having found only 107 of 108 lotuses at the time of the worship, Rama decided to offer one of his eyes in place of that lotus. When he was about to offer his eye, Durga appeared and told him that she had only hidden the flower in order to test his devotion and she was satisfied with it. (Note: Sandhi puja, during Durga Puja, involves the offering of 108 lotuses and lighting of 108 lamps.) She blessed Rama and he continued with her worship. Since the gods are believed to be sleeping during autumn, the awakening rite of the Durga puja is also known as akālabodhana.

Surviving manuscripts from the 14th-century provide guidelines for Durga Puja, while historical records suggest the royalty and wealthy families to be sponsoring major Durga Puja public festivities, since at least the 16th-century. The 11th or 12th-century Jain text Yashastilaka by Somadeva mentions an annual festival dedicated to a warrior goddess, celebrated by the king and his armed forces, and the description mirrors attributes of Durga Puja.

Between the 12th and 16th centuries, regional Sanskrit scholars authored specialized liturgical manuals (nibandhas) that standardized Durga worship based on Puranic texts. Key works include Jimutavahana's Durgotsavanirnaya, and Raghunandana's 16th-century Durgapujatattva organized these practices in Bengal, alongside Vidyapati's influential 15th-century Maithili treatise, Durgabhaktitarangini. These texts established formal instruction for central rites, such as preliminary awakening (bodhana) and the crucial juncture of sandhi puja. These grounded the regional practice in classical Shastric orders.

According to some scholars, the worship of the fierce warrior goddess Durga, and her darker and more violent manifestation Kali, became popular in the Bengal region during and after the medieval era, marked by Muslim invasions and conquests.

The significance of Durga and other goddesses in Hindu culture is stated to have increased after Islamic armies conquered regions of the Indian subcontinent. According to yet other scholars, the marginalisation of Bengali Hindus during the medieval era led to a reassertion of Hindu identity and an emphasis on Durga Puja as a social festival, publicly celebrating the warrior goddess.

== Rituals and practices ==
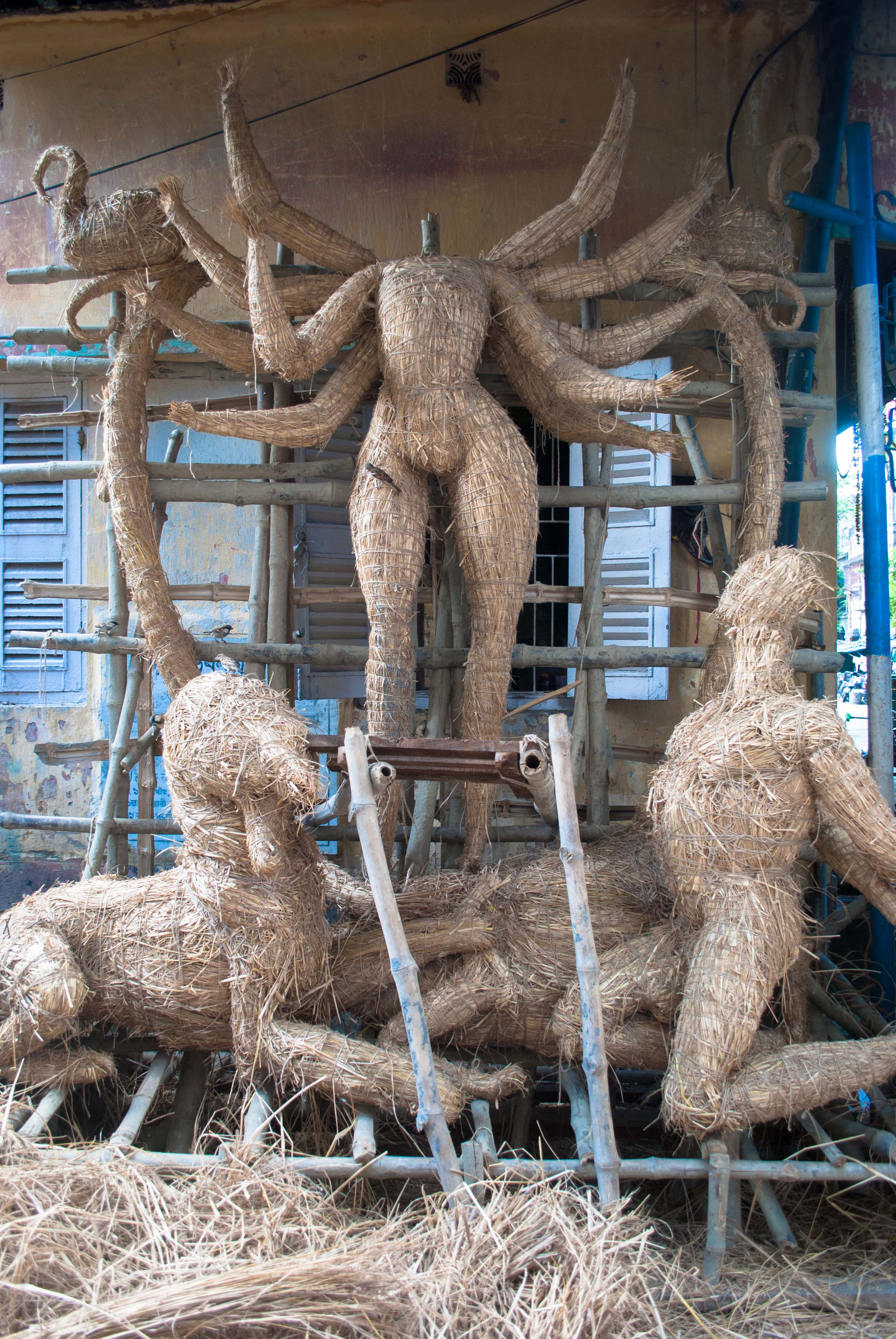
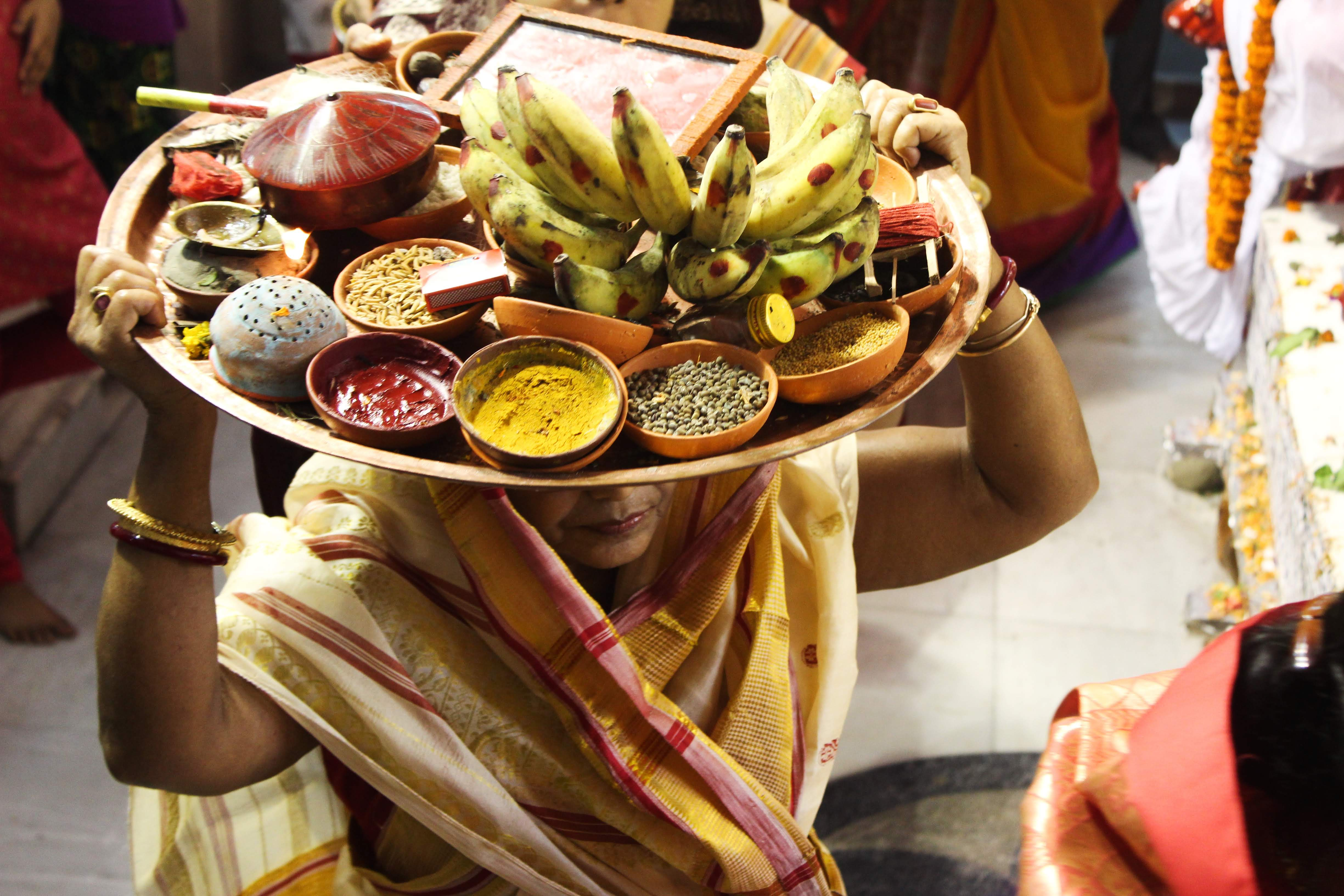
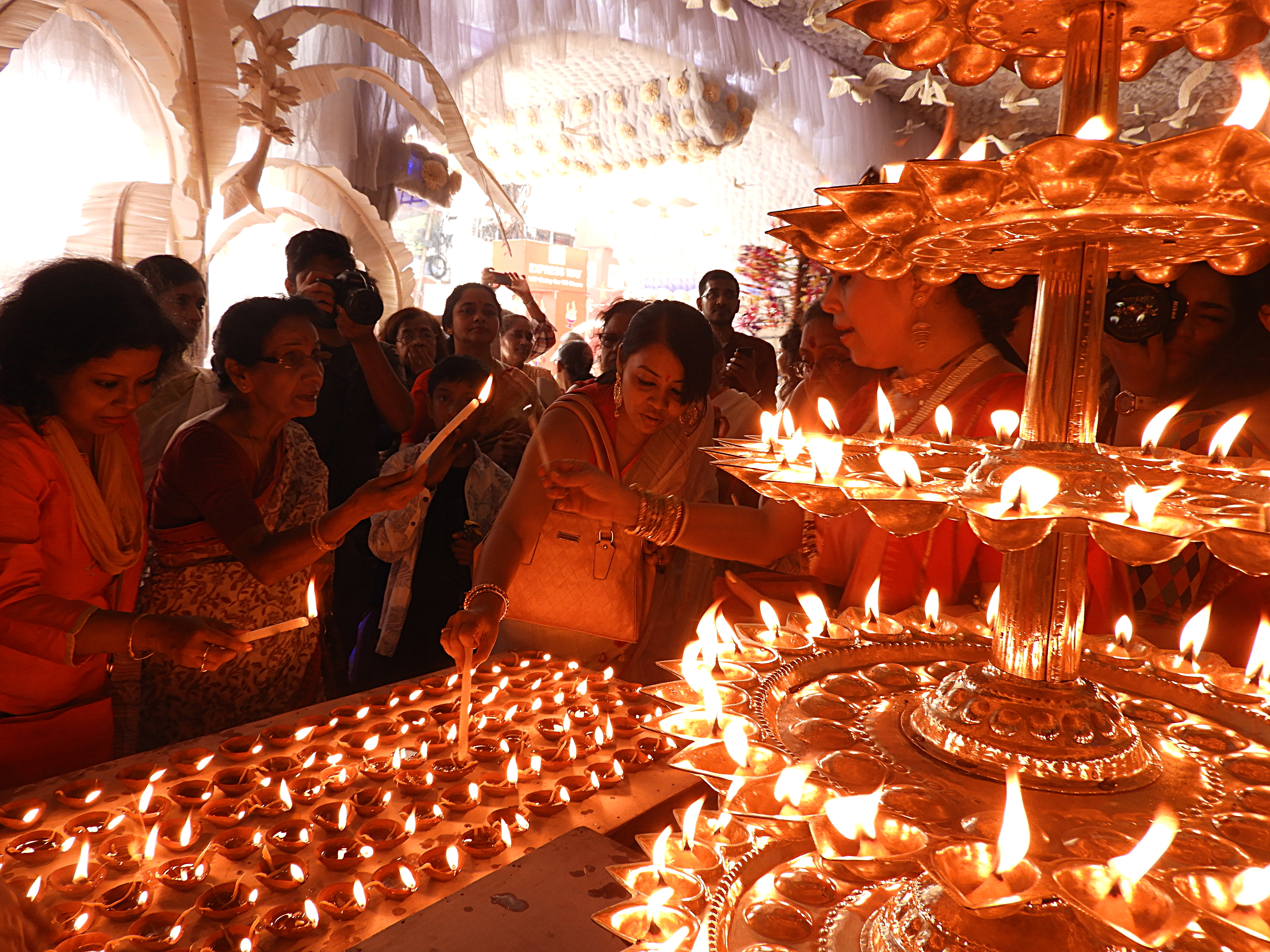
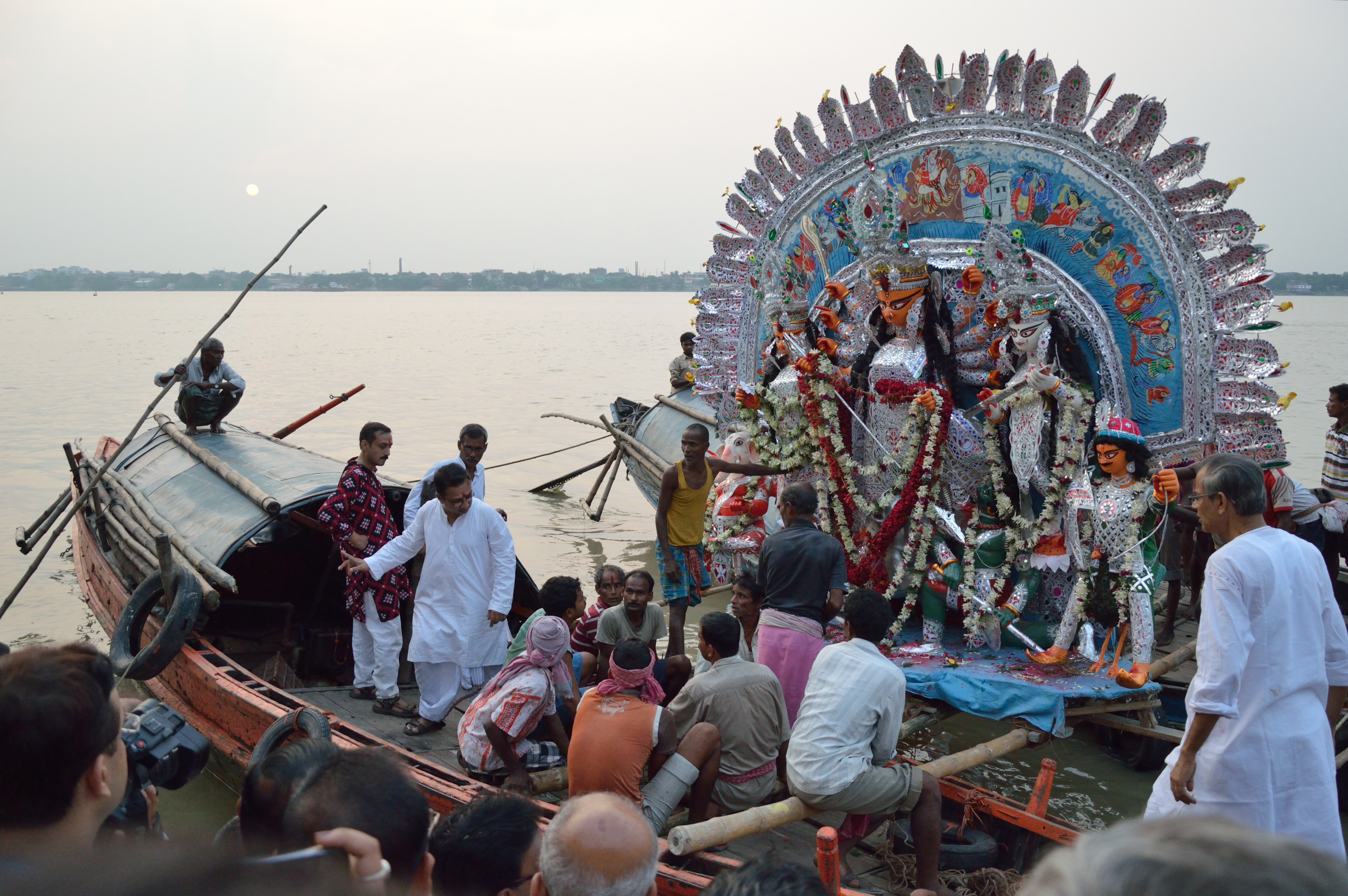
From top left to bottom right (a) Structure of a Durga sculpture-idol being made at Kumortuli; (b) Lady carrying offerings for the puja; (c) Sandhi puja on the day of Ashtami; (d) Immersion of the sculpture-idol on Vijaya Dashami.

=== Texts ===
The puja rituals involve mantras (words manifesting spiritual transformation), shlokas (holy verses), chants and arati, and offerings. The worship begins with a reading of the Sanskrit Devī Mahātmya from the sixth-century Mārkaṇḍeya Purāṇa. The shlokas and mantras praise the divinity of the goddess; according to the shlokas, Durga is omnipresent as the embodiment of power, success, courage, victory, nourishment, memory, forbearance, faith, forgiveness, intellect, wealth, emotions, desires, beauty, satisfaction, righteousness, fulfilment and peace. (Note: Various versions of Devi mantra exist. Examples include: [a] "We know the Great Goddess. We make a meditation of the goddess Durga. May that Goddess guide us on the right path." (Durga Gayatri Mantra, recited at many stages of Durga Puja); [b] Hrim! O blessed goddess Durga, come here, stay here, stay here, take up residence here, accept my worship. (Durga Avahana Mantra); etc.)

== Scriptural references ==
- Markandeya Purana (Devi Mahatmya / Chandi Path): The primary text narrating the battle of Durga with Mahishasura.
- Devi Bhagavata Purana: Expands on the cosmic significance of Maa Durga and her victory.
- Skanda Purana: Mentions Durga's various forms and their purpose in destroying evil.
- Varaha Purana: Contains references to the goddess as Mahishasura Mardini.
- Tantra Texts (e.g., Devi Mahatmyam in Shakta Tantra): Emphasize her as Shakti, the supreme power.

=== Relation to harvest ===
While ethnographic accounts frequently highlight seasonal and post-monsoon associations, canonical Shakta ritual manuals and Puranas—such as the Kalika Purana and Raghunandana's Durgapujatattva—frame vegetation rites within the doctrine of divine immanence. Central to this is the Navapatrika (nine plants), often colloquially misidentified as Kola Bou (banana bride). Rather than representing a folk harvest deity, the bundle comprises nine specific botanical species—banana, turmeric, wood apple, pomegranate, Ashoka, arum, colacassia, barley/rice, and manaka—each consecrated as an embodiment of one of the nine forms of the goddess (including Brahmani, Kalika, Durga, and Chamunda).

The festival is a social and public event in the eastern and northeastern states of India, where it dominates religious and socio-cultural life, with temporary pandals built at community squares, roadside shrines, and temples. The festival is also observed by some Shakta Hindus as a private home-based festival.

Before Durga puja there is Paata Puja, the ritual of making an idol on the day of the Rath Yatra, usually around July. 'Paata' is the wooden frame that forms the base for the idols.

=== Day Zero ===
Durga Puja is a ten-day event. The festival begins with Mahalaya, a day on which Hindus perform tarpaṇa by offering water and food to their dead ancestors. The day also marks the arrival of Durga from her marital home in Kailash.

Mahalaya marks the transition between the fortnight of ancestors (Pitru Paksha) and the fortnight of goddess (Devi Paksha). This invokes the descent of the goddess. Artisans traditionally perform Chokkhu Daan (ritual painting of the eyes) around this period. This symbolizes the awakening of the idol prior to formal consecration (prana pratishtha) on Shashti.

Bengalis now start their Mahalaya with Mahishasuramardini sung by Birendra Krishna Bhadra at 4:00 AM.

=== Day One to Five ===
Day one(Pratipada) to five(Panchami) mark the remembrance of the goddess and her manifestations, such as Kumari (goddess of fertility), Mai (mother), Ajima (grandmother), Lakshmi (goddess of wealth) and in some regions as the Saptamatrikas (seven mothers) or Navadurga (nine aspects of Durga). On the sixth day major festivities and social celebrations start. The first nine days overlap with Navaratri festivities in other traditions of Hinduism.The specific practices vary by region.

=== Day Six to Nine ===
The next significant day of the festival is the sixth day (Shashthi), on which devotees welcomes the goddess and festive celebrations are inaugurated. Rituals typically performed on the sixth day include:

Akalabodhana: Involves rites to awaken and welcome the goddess to be a guest. The amorphous sight of the goddess is consecrated into a ghata or noggin while the visible sight is consecrated into the murti or idol. These rituals are known as ghatasthapana and pranapratistha respectively.

Adhivasa: Anointing ritual wherein symbolic offerings are made to Durga, with each item representing a remembrance of subtle forms of her.

On the seventh day (Saptami), eighth (Ashtami) and ninth (Navami) days, the goddess along with Lakshmi, Saraswati, Ganesha, and Kartikeya are revered and these days mark the main days of worship with recitation of scriptures, puja, legends of Durga in Devi Mahatmya, social visits to elaborately decorated and illuminated pandals (temporary structures meant for hosting the puja), among others.

  - Navapatrika snan: Bathing of the navapatrika with holy water done on the seventh day of the festival. The Navapatrika are actually believed to symbolize nine special forms of Goddess Durga:
    1. Kadali or Rambhā (Banana tree): The goddess Brahmani is the patron of the Kadali tree;
    2. Kachu (Taro tree): Goddess Kalika, the patroness of the kachu tree;
    3. Haridrā (Turmeric tree): Goddess Uma is the presiding deity of the Haridra tree;
    4. Jayantī (Egyptian riverhemp: Goddess Kartiki or Devsena, the patron of the Jayanti tree;
    5. Bilva (Bael tree): Goddess Shiva is the patron of the Bilva tree;
    6. Dālima (Pomegranate Tree): Goddess Raktadantika, the patroness of the dalim tree;
    7. Ashoka tree: Goddess Shokaharita, the owner of the Ashoka tree;
    8. Mānkachu (Alocasia macrorrhizos): Goddess Chamunda, the presiding deity of the Mankachu tree;
    9. Paddy: Goddess Lakshmi is the patroness of the paddy plant .
- Sandhi puja and Ashtami pushpanjali: The eighth day begins with elaborate pushpanjali rituals. The cusp of the ending of the eighth day and beginning of the ninth day is considered to be the moment when per scriptures Durga engaged in a fierce battle against Mahishasura and was attacked by the demons Chanda and Munda. Goddess Chamunda emerged from the third eye of Durga and killed Chanda and Munda at the cusp of Ashtami and Navami, the eighth and ninth days respectively. This moment is marked by the sandhi puja, involving the offering of 108 lotuses and lighting of 108 lamps. It is a forty-eight minutes long ritual commemorating the climax of battle. The rituals are performed in the last 24 minutes of Ashtami and the first 24 minutes of Navami. In some regions, devotees sacrifice an animal such as a buffalo or goat, but in many regions, there is not an actual animal sacrifice and a symbolic sacrifice substitutes it. The surrogate effigy is smeared in red vermilion to symbolise the blood spilled. The goddess is then offered food (bhog). Some places also engage in devotional service.
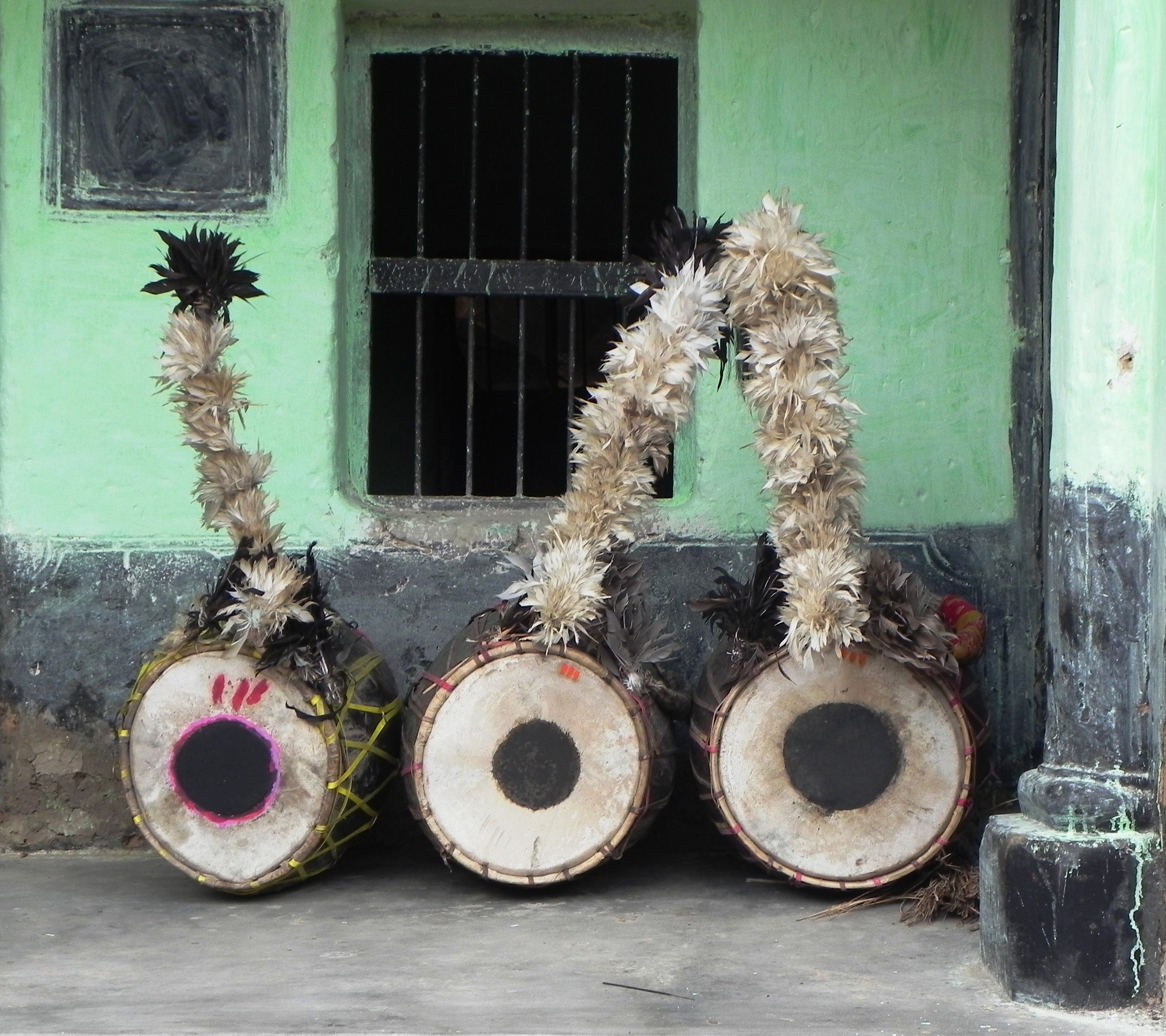
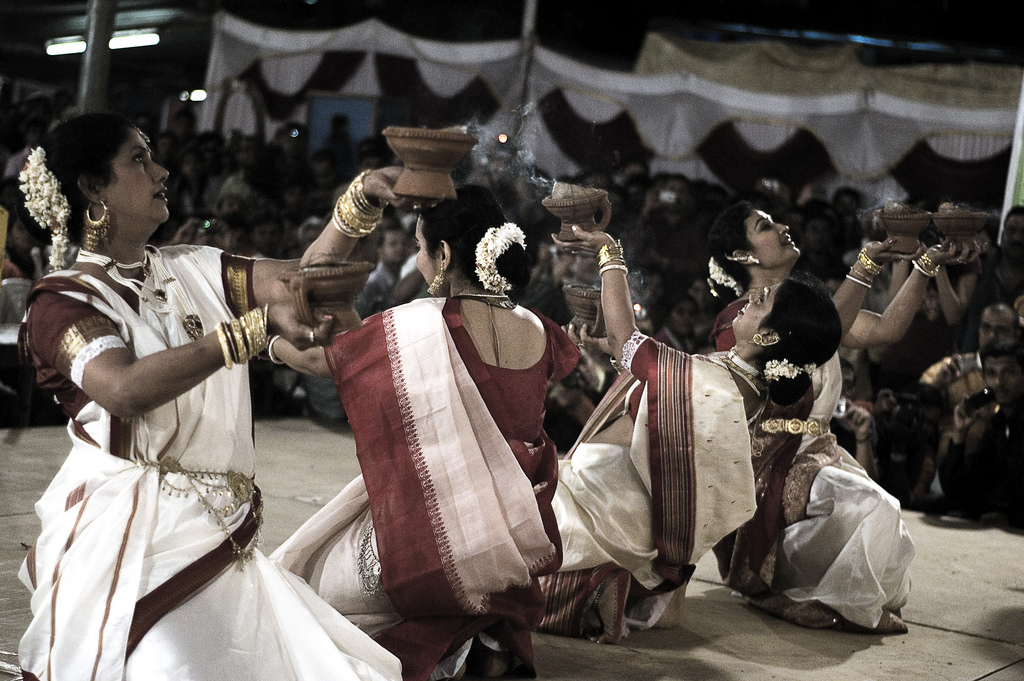
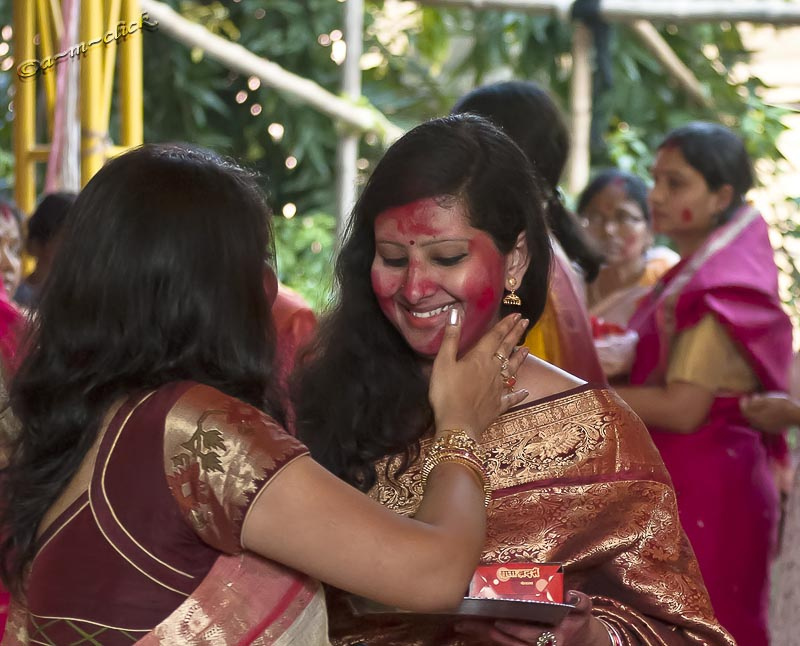
Left: Dhaks, played during the pujo; right: Dhunuchi naach on Navami; bottom: Women taking part in sindoor khela on Vijaya Dashami.

Durga Puja dhak beats
A 47-seconds sample of dhak playing.

- Homa and bhog: The ninth day of festival is marked with the homa (fire oblation) rituals and bhog. Some places also perform kumari puja on this day.

==== Nisha Puja ====
Nisha Puja
- Genre: Hindu festival
- Begins: Saptami tithi
- Ends: Ashtami tithi
- Frequency: annually
- Venue: Durga Puja pandal
- Location: Indian subcontinent
- Countries: India, Nepal and Bangladesh

Nisha Puja (Devanagari: निशा पूजा) is a sacred ritualistic occasion in Hinduism to experience the power and grace of the Goddess Durga at the mid night time on the Saptami tithi during the Durga Puja festival in the Indian subcontinent. It holds special significance in the Durga Puja festival, although it is also present in other traditions. The Hindu adherents, believe that this worship helps them to dispel the darkness of life and promote positivity and hope.

According to Hindu scriptures, the term Nisha means night. During the Durga Puja festival, the Ashtami tithi has its own significance but it starts at the midnight of the Saptami day, so the worship of Goddess Durga is conducted at night when the Saptami tithi ends and Ashtami tithi starts. Since the rituals of the worship is conducted at night, so it is called as Nisha Puja which translates as worship at night.

On this occasion, the worship and aarti of Goddess Mahishasuramardini Jagadamba is performed by lighting as many diyas as possible, five, eleven, twenty-one, fifty-four, one hundred and eight, at the prayer place of our homes. It believed that at least five diyas should be lighted there. In the evening of the day, a sacred Nisha Jatra of devotees is also observed. In the Mithila region of the subcontinent, a special ritual of Beltodi is also performed by the Maithil people in the region on this day. During the rituals of Nisha Puja, Kalaratri form of Goddess Durga is worshipped. It is observed all over the subcontinent. According to legend, the colour of Goddess Kalaratri is black. Due to her colour, she is called Kalaratri. She is the most terrible form of Maa Adishakti. Her vehicle is a gardabha. There are some specific mantra, stuti, prarthana and kavach recitations. The major mantra of chanting during the rituals of Nisha Puja is

ॐ देवी कालरात्र्यै नमः॥

— Kalaratri Mantra

In the tradition of Tantra Sadhana, the Nisha Puja represents a sacred time for wishing power. The followers of the Tantra Sadhana tradition known as Tantrics, perform special secret ceremonies. They use to perform all kinds of left-handed rituals during this time.

The Nisha Puja includes a night jagaran (vigil) and worshipping Goddess Durga. The devotees in the jagaran perform different rituals to praise and please Goddess Jagdamba. During the night jagaran, recitation of Durga Saptashati, Durga Kavach, Hriday and Satnaam Paath are conducted by Brahmins or Pundit. According to adherents, reciting Durga Saptashati as per Markandeya Purana helps in pleasing Goddess Jagdamba. During the Nisha Puja, there is a provision of Panchamakara worship. In the Panchamakara Puja cow's milk, curd and ghee made from cow's milk, honey and sugar are used for rituals. The worship and rituals of Nisha Puja starts around 12 o'clock in the midnight. Goddess Durga is decorated with 16 shringars (adornments) on this occasion. On this occasion, 56 types of offerings are offered to the Goddess. In the mid night of the Saptami day, two types of worships are conducted. They are Nisha Puja and Sandhi Puja. The Sandhi Puja refers to the time when Saptami ends and Ashtami begins. The indic term Sandhi literally means to connect.

=== Day Ten ===
- Sindoor khela and immersion: The tenth and last day, called Vijaya Dashami is marked by sindoor khela, where women smear sindoor or vermillion on the sculpture-idols and also smear each other with it. This ritual signifies the wishing of a blissful marital life for married women. Historically the ritual has been restricted to married women. The tenth day is the day when Durga emerged victorious against Mahishasura and it ends with a procession where the clay sculpture-idols are ceremoniously taken to a river or coast for immersion rites. Following the immersion, Durga is believed to return to her mythological marital home of Kailasa to Shiva and the cosmos in general. People distribute sweets and gifts, visit their friends and family members on the tenth day. Some communities such as those near Varanasi mark the day after Vijaya Dashami, called Ekadashi, by visiting a Durga temple.

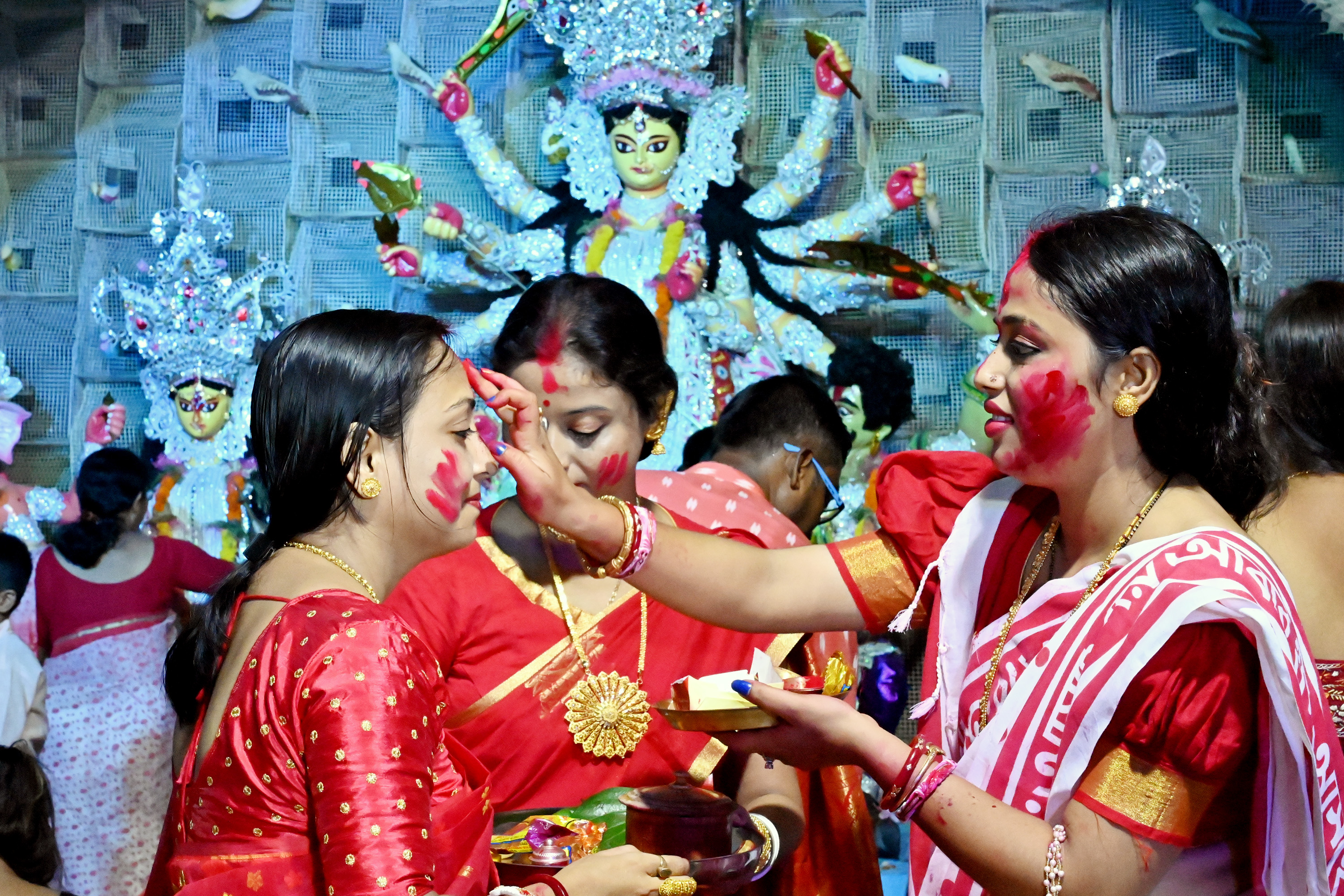
Women at Nowgong Bengali Association Durga Puja joyfully smear each other with vermillion as part of the exuberant Durga Puja festival celebrations in Nagaon, Assam, India.

- Dhunuchi naach and dhuno pora: Dhunuchi naach involves a dance ritual performed with dhunuchi (incense burner). Drummers called dhakis, carrying large leather-strung Dhaks, Dhols and other traditional drums depending on the region, to create music, to which people dance either during or not during arati. Some places, especially home pujas, also observe dhuno pora, a ritual involving married women carrying dhunuchis burning with incense and dried coconuts, on a cloth on their head and hands,

=== Decorations, sculptures, and stages ===
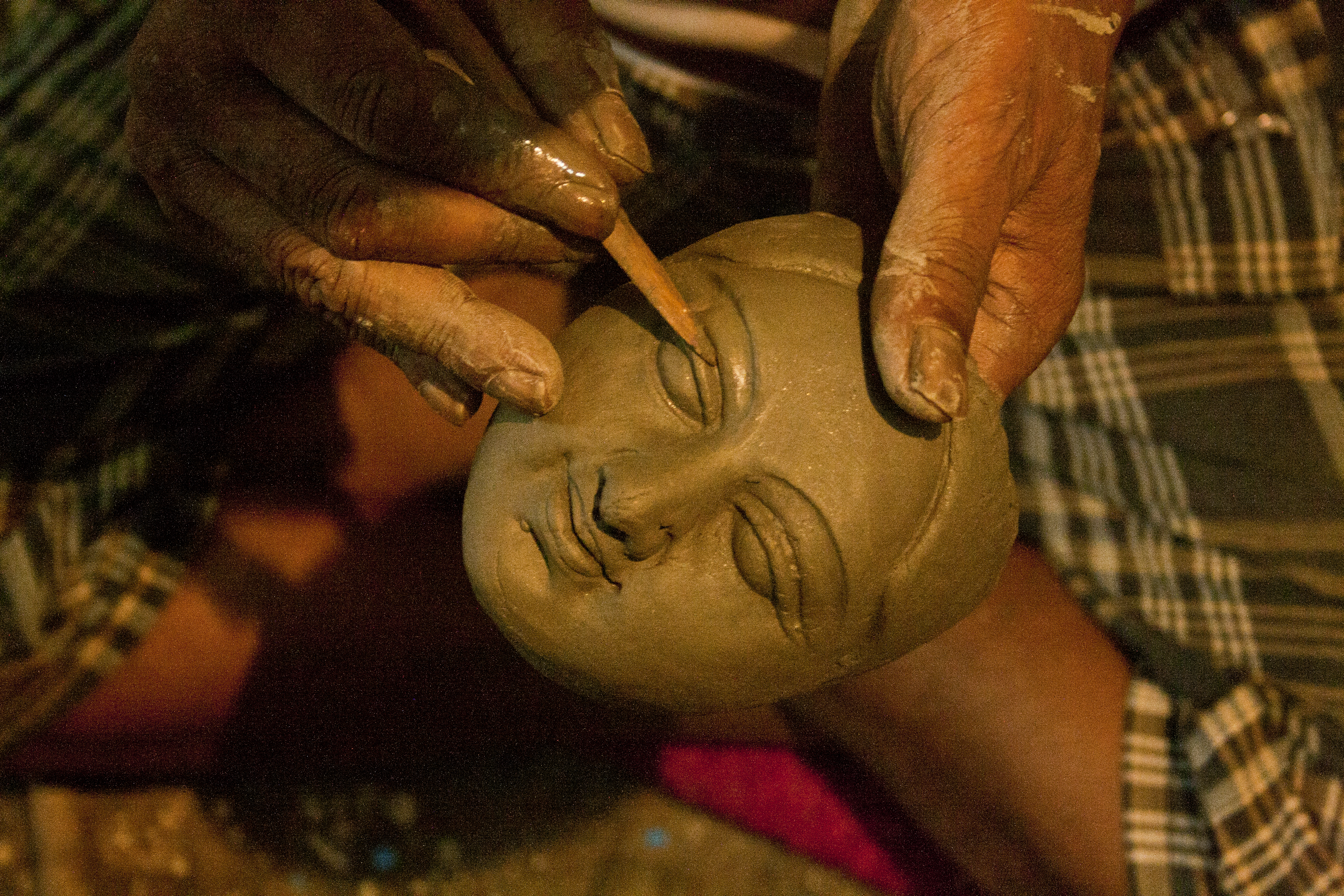
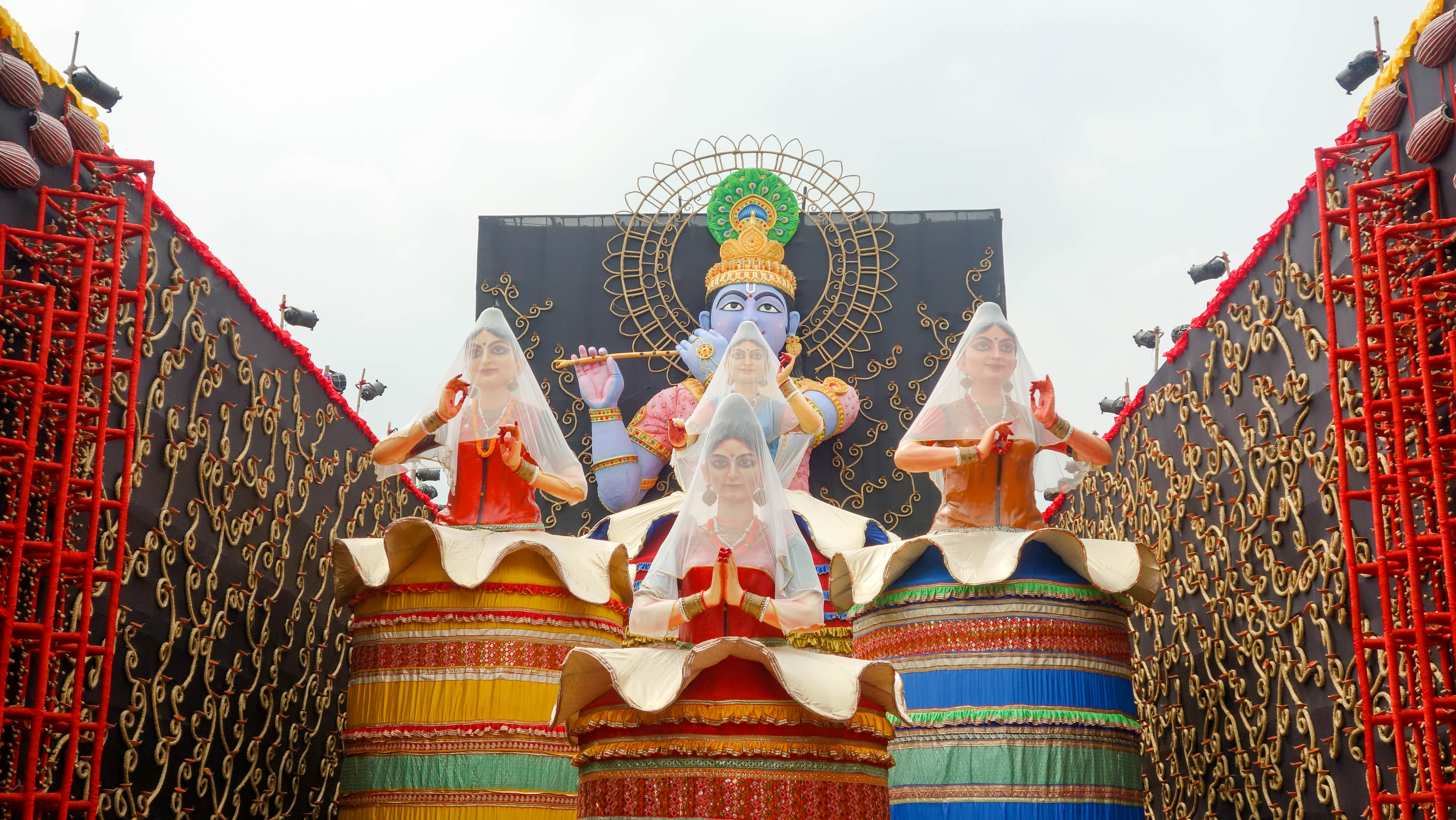
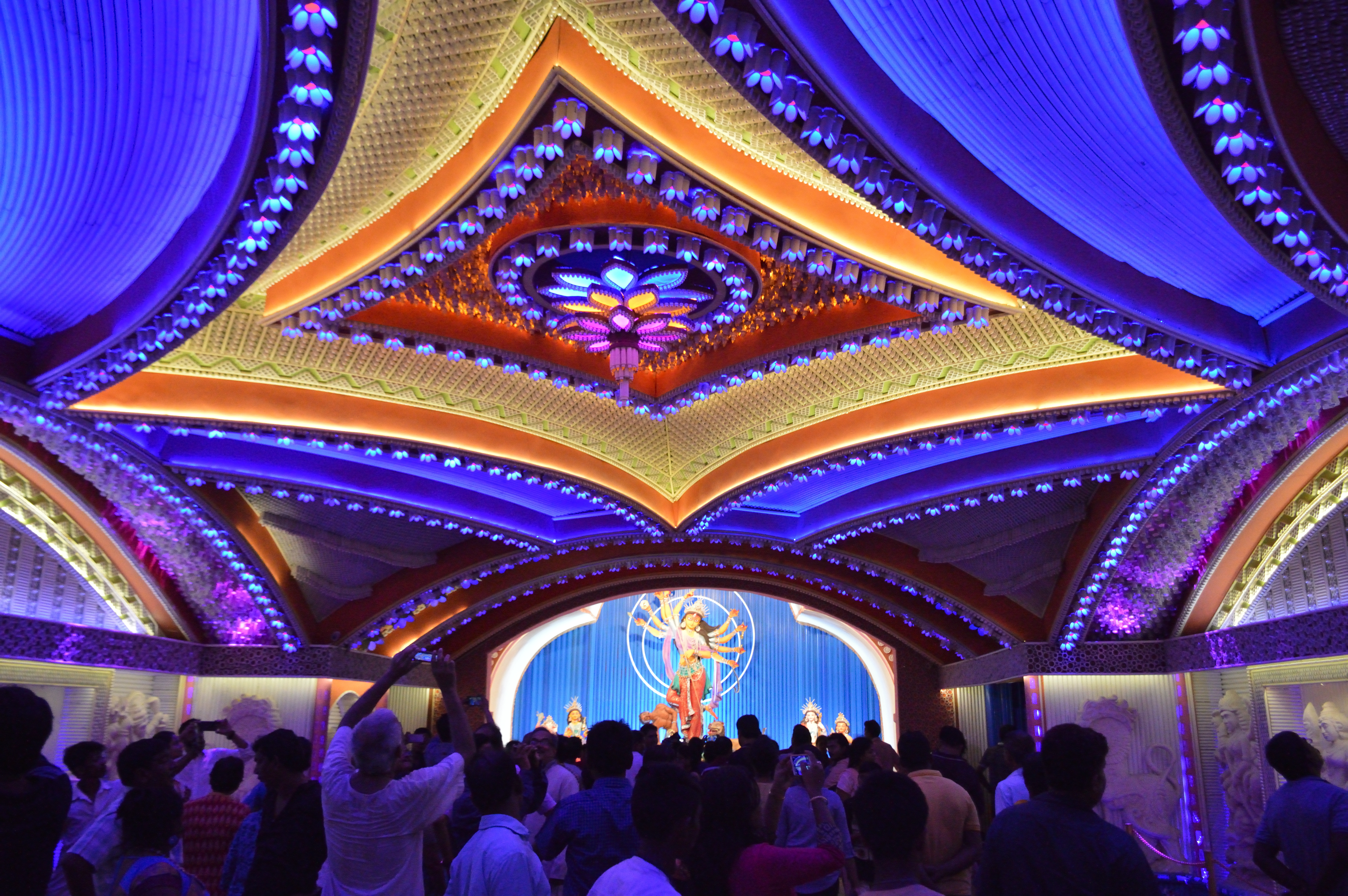
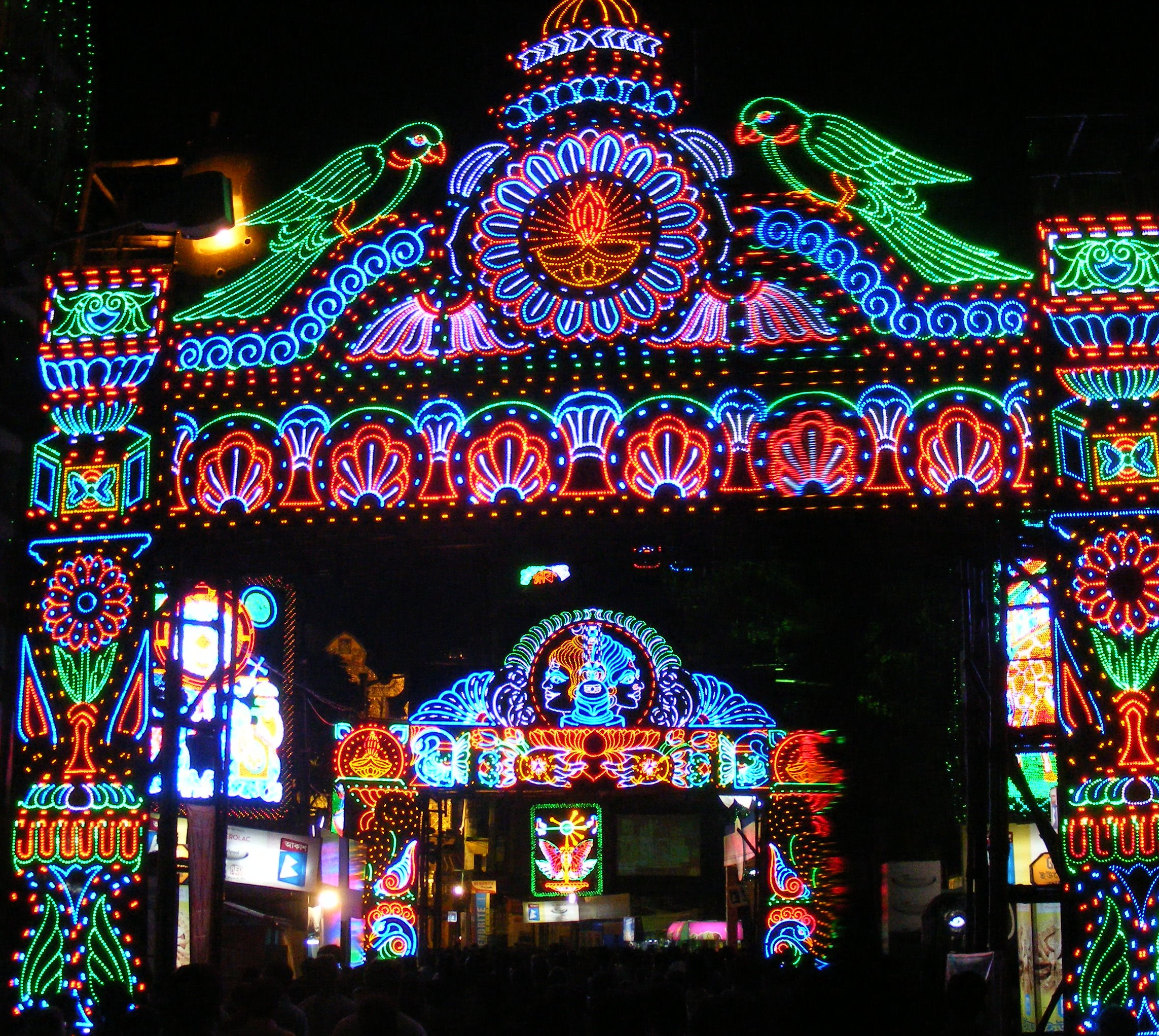
From top left to bottom right (a) A craftsperson sculpting the face of the sculpture-idol; (b) Durga Puja pandal decorations in Kolkata; (c) Interior decorations of a pandal; (d) Street lights installed during the festivities.

The process of the creation of clay sculpture-idols (pratima or murti) for the puja, from the collection of clay to the ornamentation is a ceremonial process. Though the festival is observed post-monsoon harvest, the artisans begin making the sculpture-idols months before, during summer. The process begins with prayers to Ganesha and to the perceived divinity in materials such as bamboo frames in which the sculpture-idols are cast.

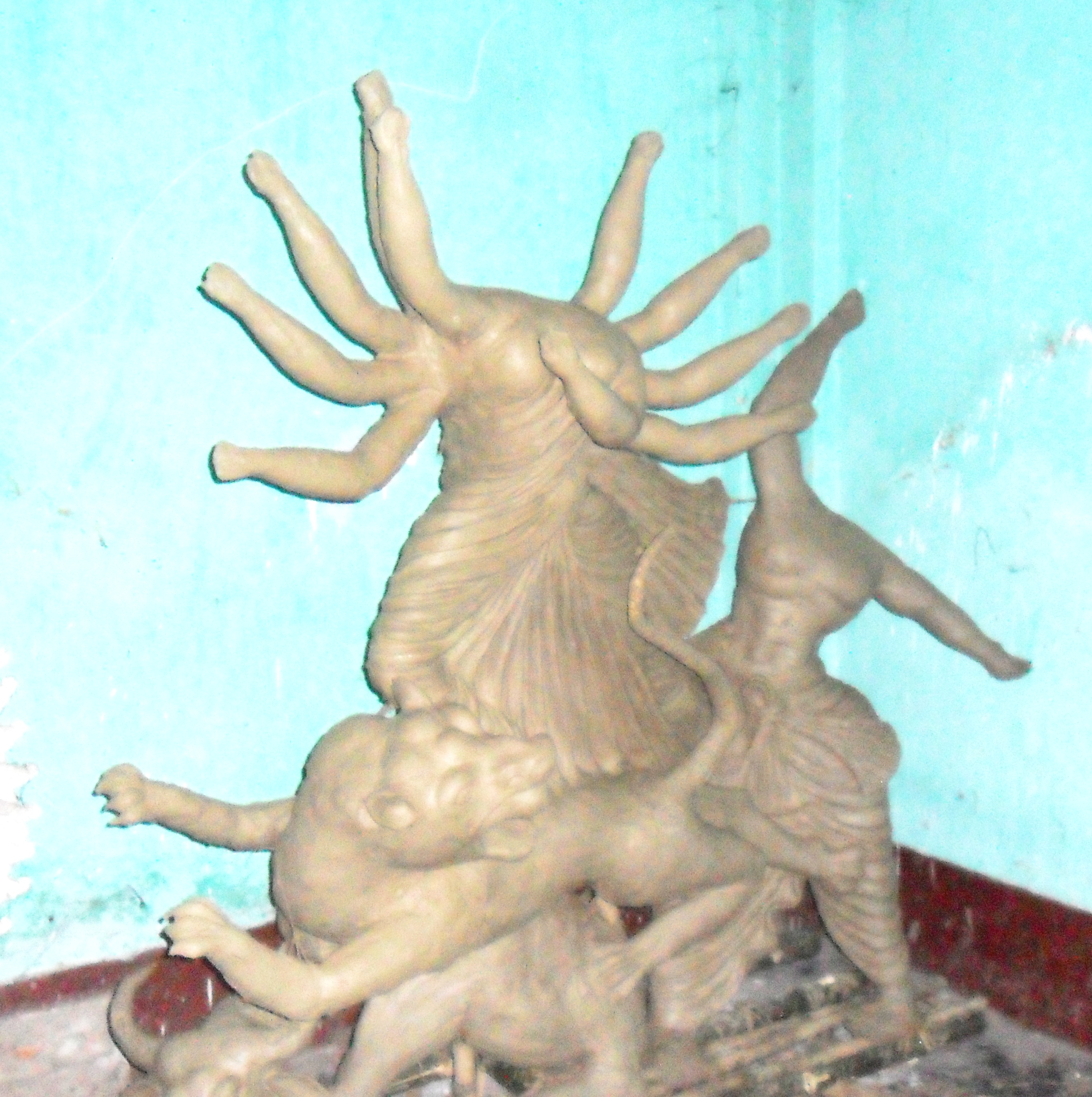
Clay statue being made

Clay, or alluvial soil, collected from different regions form the base. This choice is a tradition wherein Durga, perceived as the creative energy and material, is believed to be present everywhere and in everything in the universe. In certain traditions in Kolkata, a custom is to include soil samples in the clay mixture for Durga from areas believed to be nishiddho pallis (forbidden territories; territories inhabited by the "social outcasts" such as brothels).

The clay base is combined with straw, kneaded, and then moulded into a cast made from hay and bamboo. This is layered to a fine final shape, cleaned, painted, and polished. A layer of a fibre called jute, mixed in with clay, is also attached to the top to prevent the statue from cracking in the months ahead. The heads of the statues are more complex and are usually made separately. The limbs of the statues are mostly shaped from bundles of straws. Then, starting about August, the local artisans hand-paint the sculpture-idols which are later dressed in clothing, are decorated and bejewelled, and displayed at the puja altars.

The procedure for and proportions of the sculpture-idols are described in arts-related Sanskrit texts of Hinduism, such as the Vishvakarma Sashtra.

==== Environmental impact ====
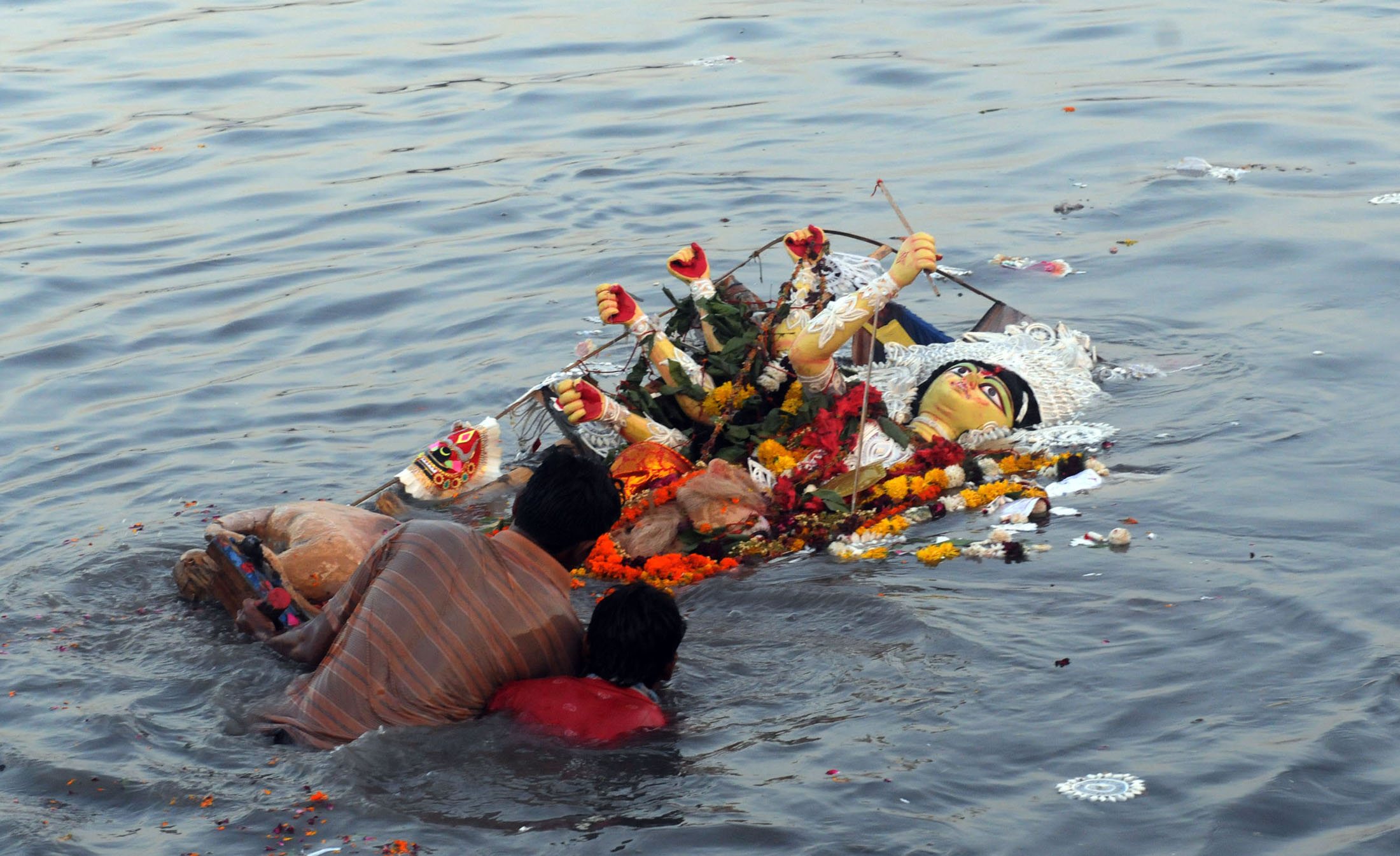
A Durga sculpture-idol in the river, post-immersion.

The sculpture-idols for the puja are traditionally made of biodegradable materials such as straw, clay, soil, and wood. In today's times, brighter coloured statues have increased in popularity and have diversified the use of non-biodegradable, cheaper or more colourful substitute synthetic raw materials. Environmental activists have raised concerns about the paint used to produce the statue, stating that the heavy metals in these paints pollute rivers when the statues are immersed at the end of the Durga festival.

Brighter colours that are also biodegradable and eco-friendly, as well as the traditional natural colours, are typically more expensive compared to the non biodegradable paints. The Indian state of West Bengal has banned the use of hazardous paints, and various state government have started distributing lead-free paints to artisans at no cost to prevent pollution.

=== Animal sacrifice, symbolic sacrifice ===
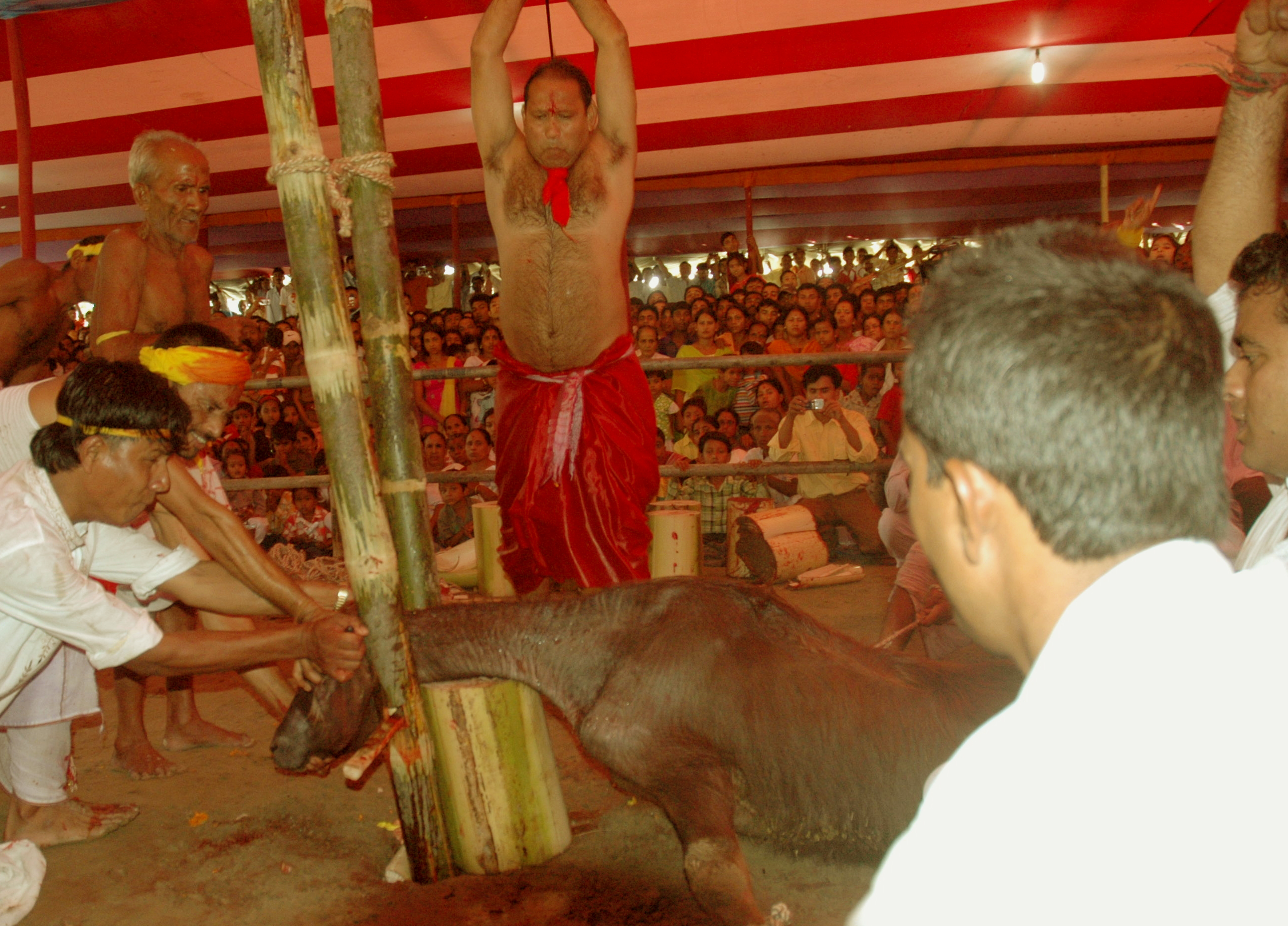
Sacrifice of a buffalo during Durga Puja, in Assam.

Shakta Hindu communities mark the slaying of Mahishasura and the victory of Durga with a symbolic or actual sacrifice. Most communities prefer symbolic sacrifice, where a statue of the asura is made of flour or equivalent, is immolated and smeared with vermilion, symbolic of the blood that had spilled during the battle. Other substitutes include a vegetable or a sweet dish considered equivalent to the animal. In certain instances, devotees consider animal sacrifice distasteful, and practice alternate means of expressing devotion while respecting the views of others in their tradition.

In communities performing actual sacrifice, an animal is sacrificed, mainly at temples. In Nepal, West Bengal, Odisha, Mithila and Assam, animal sacrifices are performed at Shakta temples to commemorate the legend of Durga slaying Mahishasura. This involves slaying of a fowl, pig, goat, or male water-buffalo. Large scale animal sacrifices are rare among Hindus outside the regions of Bengal, Odisha, Mithila, Assam, and Nepal. In these regions, festivals are primarily when significant animal sacrifices are observed.

The Rajputs of Rajasthan worship their weapons and horses in the related festival of Navaratri, and some historically observed the sacrifice of a goat, a practice that continues in some places. The sacrifice ritual, supervised he the priest, requires slaying of the animal with a single stroke. In the past this ritual was considered a rite of passage into manhood and readiness as a warrior. The Kuldevi (clan deity) among these Rajput communities is a warrior goddess, with local legends tracing reverence for her during Rajput-Muslim wars.

=== Pandals and theme-based pujas ===
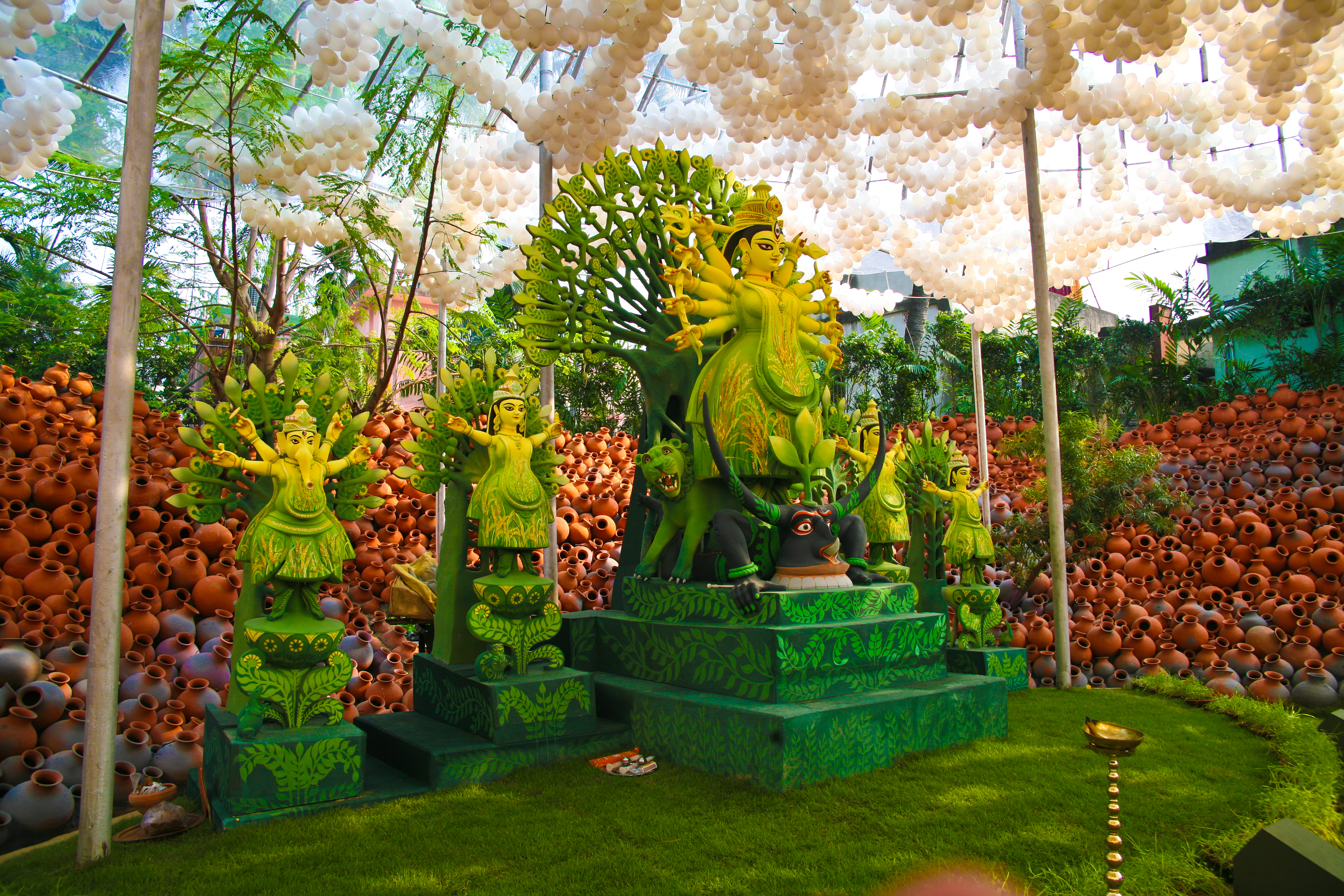
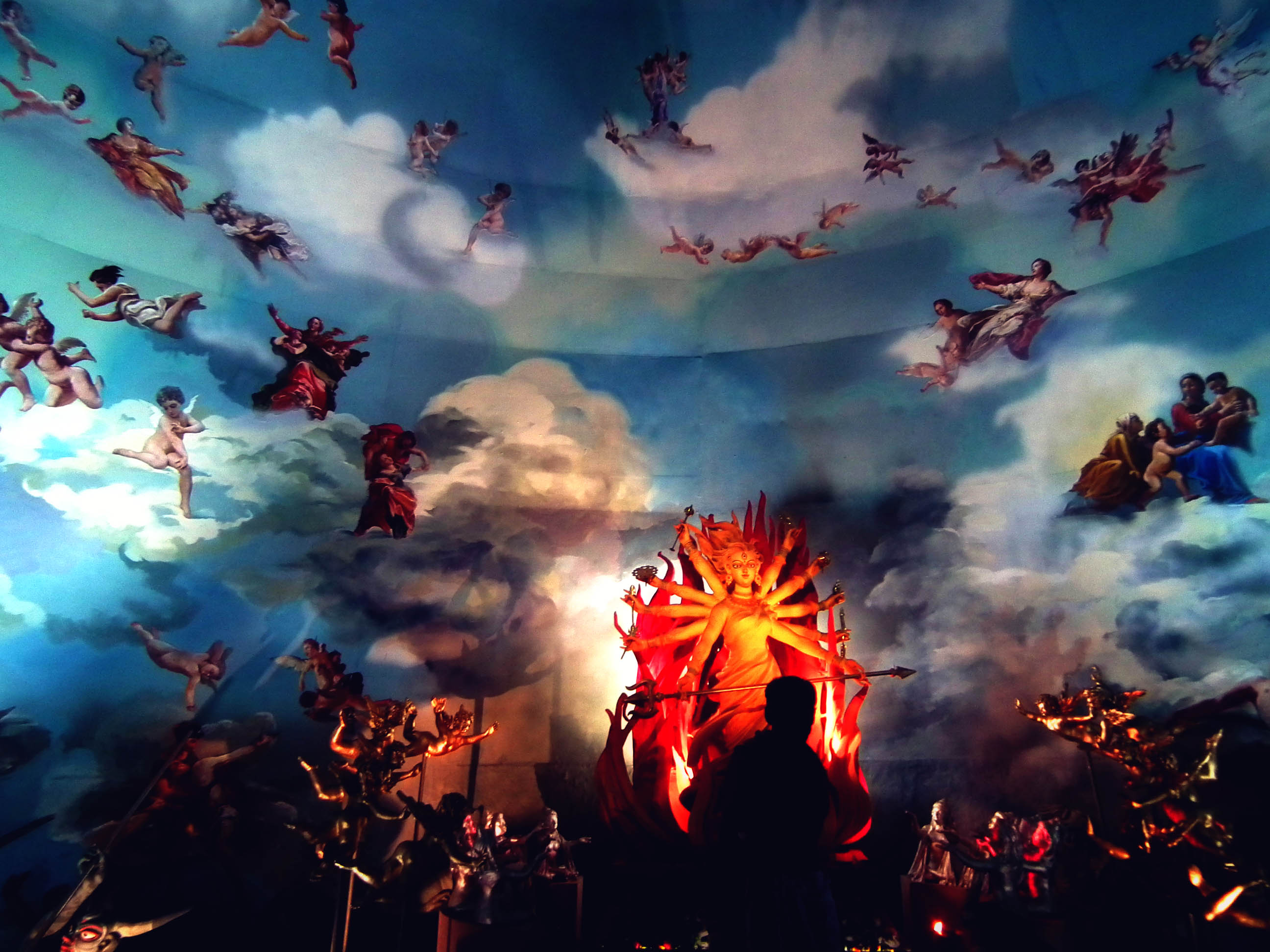
Two theme-based pandals in Kolkata.

Months before the start of Durga Puja, youth members of the community collect funds and donations, engage priests and artisans, buy votive materials and help build pandals centered around a theme, which has rose to prominence in recent years. Such themes have included sex work, celebration of humanity, marginalisation of queer persons and transgender persons, folk culture, celebration of cinema, womanhood, pro-environment themes, while others have chosen metaphorical themes such as celebration of maati (literally, soil or ash) and "finding one's own light". Pandals have also been replicated on existing temples, structures, and monuments and yet others have been made of elements such as metal scraps, nails, and turmeric among others. Durga Puja pandals have also been centered around themes to acknowledge political events such as the 2019 Balakot airstrike and to protest against the National Register of Citizens of India.

The budget required for such theme-based pujas is significantly higher than traditional pujas. For such theme-based pujas, the preparations and the building of pandals are a significant arts-related economic activity, often attracting major sponsors. Such commercialised pujas attract crowds of visitors. The growth of competitiveness in theme-based pandals has escalated costs and scale of Durga Puja in eastern states of India. Some segments of the society criticise the billboards, the economic competition, and seek return to basics. The competition takes many forms, such as the height of statue. In 2015, an 88-foot statue of Durga in Kolkata's Deshapriya Park attracted numerous devotees, with some estimates placing visitors at one million.

== Regional celebrations and observances ==
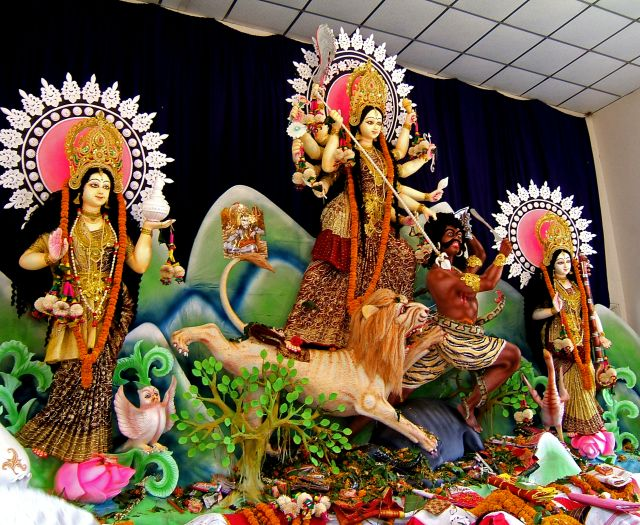
Durga Puja in Dhakeshwari Temple, Dhaka, Bangladesh.

There exists variation in Durga Puja worship practices and rituals, as is the case with other Hindu festivals, in the Indian subcontinent. Hinduism accepts flexibility and leaves the set of practices to the choice of the individuals concerned. Different localised rituals may be observed regionally, with these variations accepted across temples, pandals, and within families.

The festival is most commonly associated with Bengali Hindus, and with the community having variability and differences in practices. There may exist differences of practice between the puja of theme-based Pandals, family pujas (with puja of erstwhile aristocrat families known as bonedi puja), and community pujas (known as barowari pujas) of neighbourhoods or apartments.

The rituals of the puja also vary from being Vedic, Puranic, or Tantric, or a combination of these. The Bengali Durga Puja rituals typically combine all three. The non-Bengali Durga Puja rituals tend to be essentially Vedic (srauta) in nature but they too incorporate esoteric elements, making the puja an example of a culmination of Vedic-Tantric practices.

Historical evidence suggests that the Durga Puja has evolved over time, becoming more elaborate, social, and creative. The festival had earlier been a domestic puja, a form of practice that still remains popular. But it had also come to be celebrated in the sarvajanin (public) form, where communities get together, pool their resources and efforts to set up pandals and illuminations, and celebrate the event as a "mega-show to share". The origins of this variation are unclear, with some sources suggesting a family in Kolkata reviving such celebration in 1411 CE. While other set of sources suggest that a Bengali landlord, named Kamsanarayan, held a mega-show puja in late 16th-century Bengal. Yet, this festival of Bengal is likely much older with the discovery of 11th and 12th-century Durga Puja manual manuscripts such as Durgotsavaviveka, Durgotsava Prayoga, Vasantaviveka and Kalaviveka. The rituals associated with the Durga Puja migrated to other regions from Bengal, such as in Varanasi, a city that has historically attracted sponsorship from Hindus from various parts of the Indian subcontinent including Bengal. In contemporary India, Durga Puja is celebrated in various styles and forms.

In Assam, the historical transition of Shakti worship and the institutionalization of autumnal Durga rituals evolved through a synthesis of local customs and royal adoption across the early state systems. The tradition of worshipping clay idols of Durga in the eastern part was adopted from the Koch dynasty of western and central Assam during the reign of Pratap Singha (16th-17h century), who established the first such celebration at Bhatiapara. Balinarayan, ruler of the Darrang branch of Koch dynasty patronised the Durga Puja celebration in 1614.

In Kolkata, Durga Puja is an annual festival celebrated widely. Kolkata alone hosted more than 3,000 Barowari pujas in Kolkata in 2022, with more than 200 pujas organised in the city with a budget of over one crore rupees. Kolkata has been inscribed on the list of UNESCO Intangible Cultural Heritage Lists in December 2021.

In Bishnupur, West Bengal, Durga Puja holds a unique and significant place. The district boasts the Rajbari Durga Puja, also known as the Mrinmoyee Maa er pujo, which dates back to 994 AD. This makes it the oldest Durga Puja in the entire Bengal region, encompassing present-day West Bengal, Bangladesh, and Tripura.

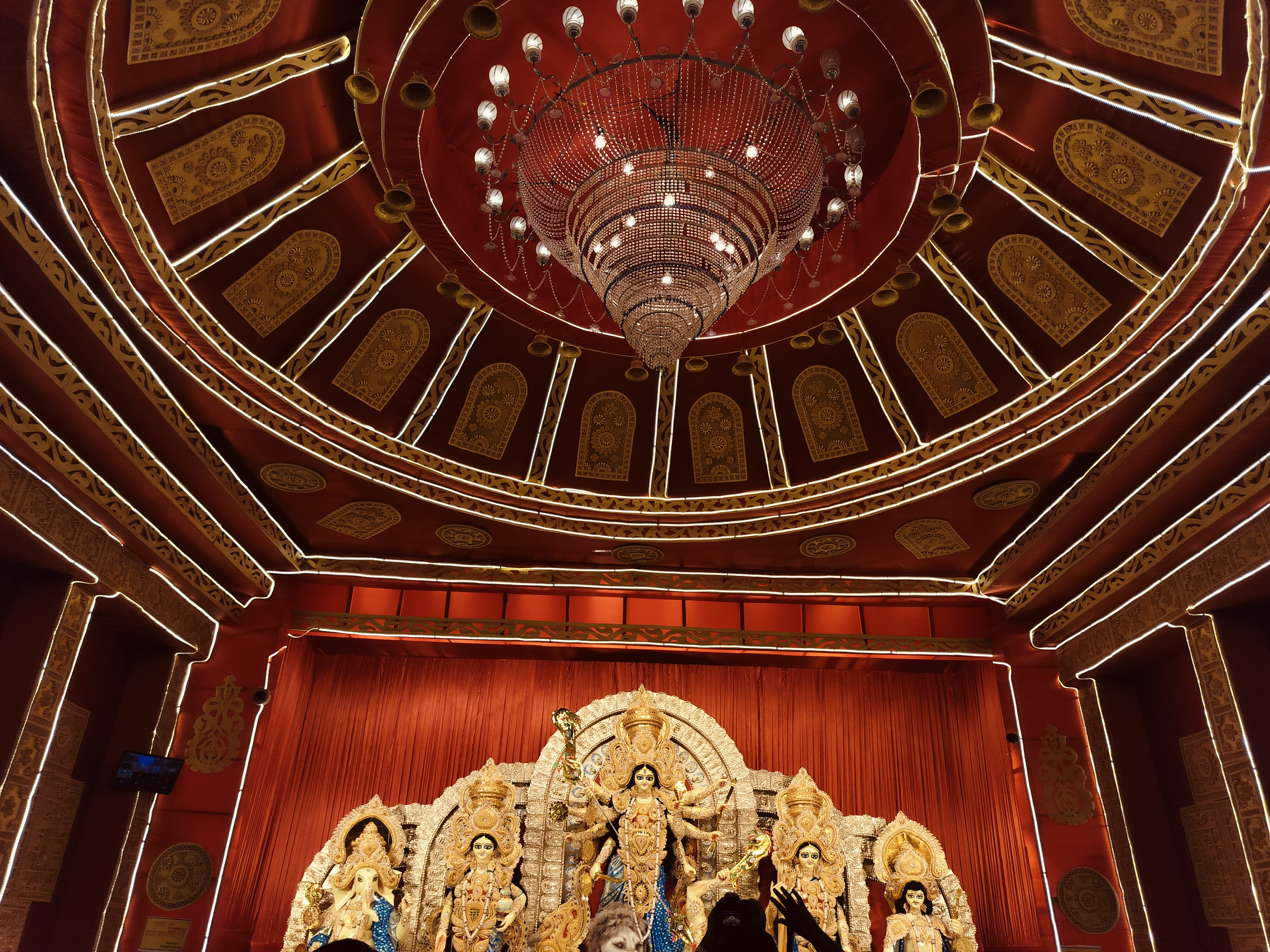
Durga Puja installation in Basirhat, West Bengal

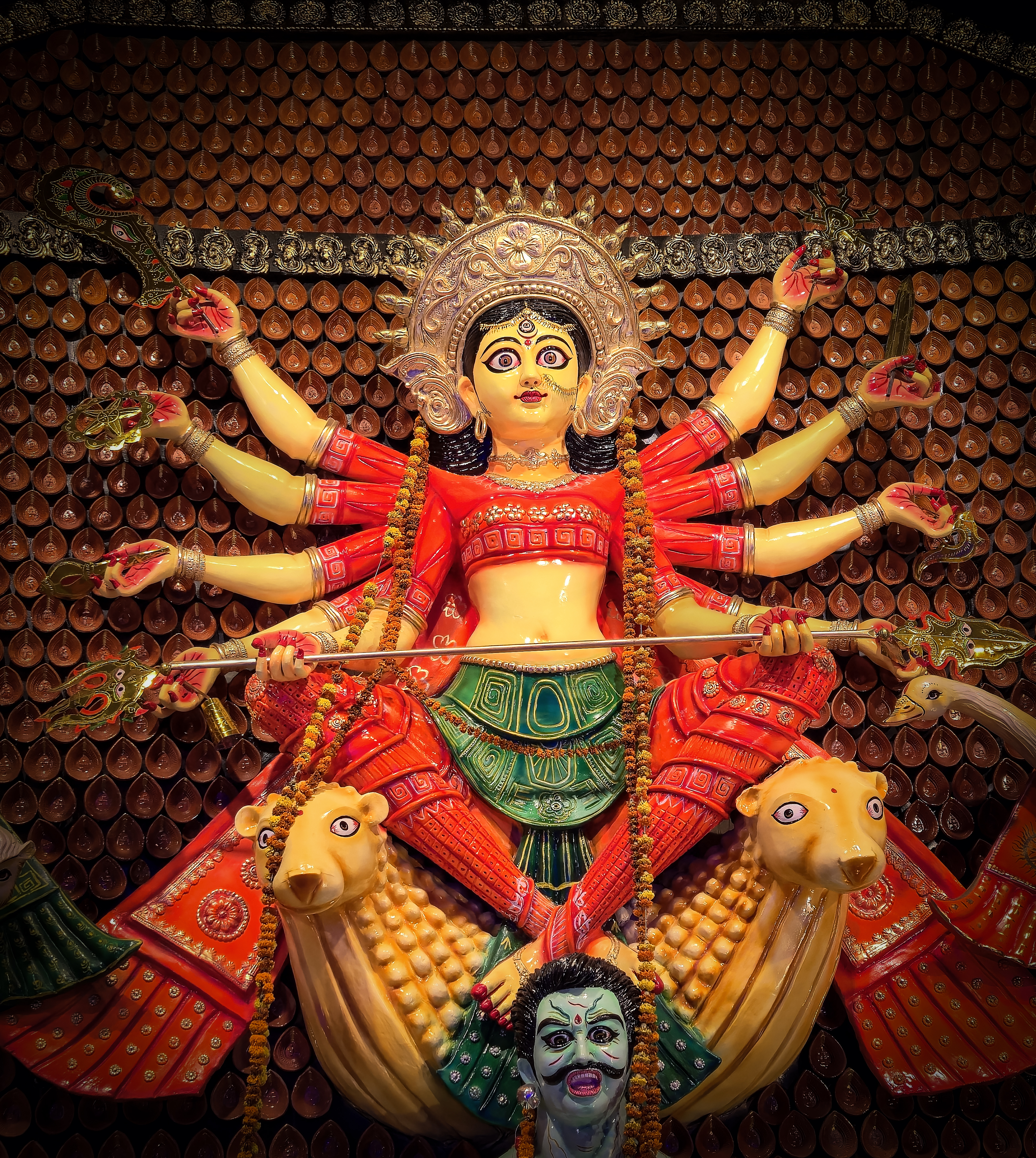
Durga idol displayed to the public in Vivekananda Sangha, Basirhat, West Bengal

In Basirhat, West Bengal, the scale and intensity of Durga Puja celebrations are among the largest in North 24 Parganas district. In terms of the number of Durga Puja pandals, the city ranks fifth in West Bengal, following Kolkata, Asansol, Durgapur, and Siliguri. For more than 150 years, the Durga idol has been immersed on boats in this city. On the day of Vijayadashami, people usually come in Basirhat to see the immersion festival. The idols and installations have changed in the modern era, but the immersion continues to be done in the Ichamati River by boat according to the ancient tradition. A fair is held on both banks of the river centering on the immersion. The special attraction of this fair is wooden furniture and various wooden items.

Siliguri, West Bengal also hosts more than 100 durga pujas, 82 of which are registered by the Siliguri Metropolitan Police. Siliguri's Durga Puja is the third largest in West Bengal after Kolkata and Asansol-Durgapur.

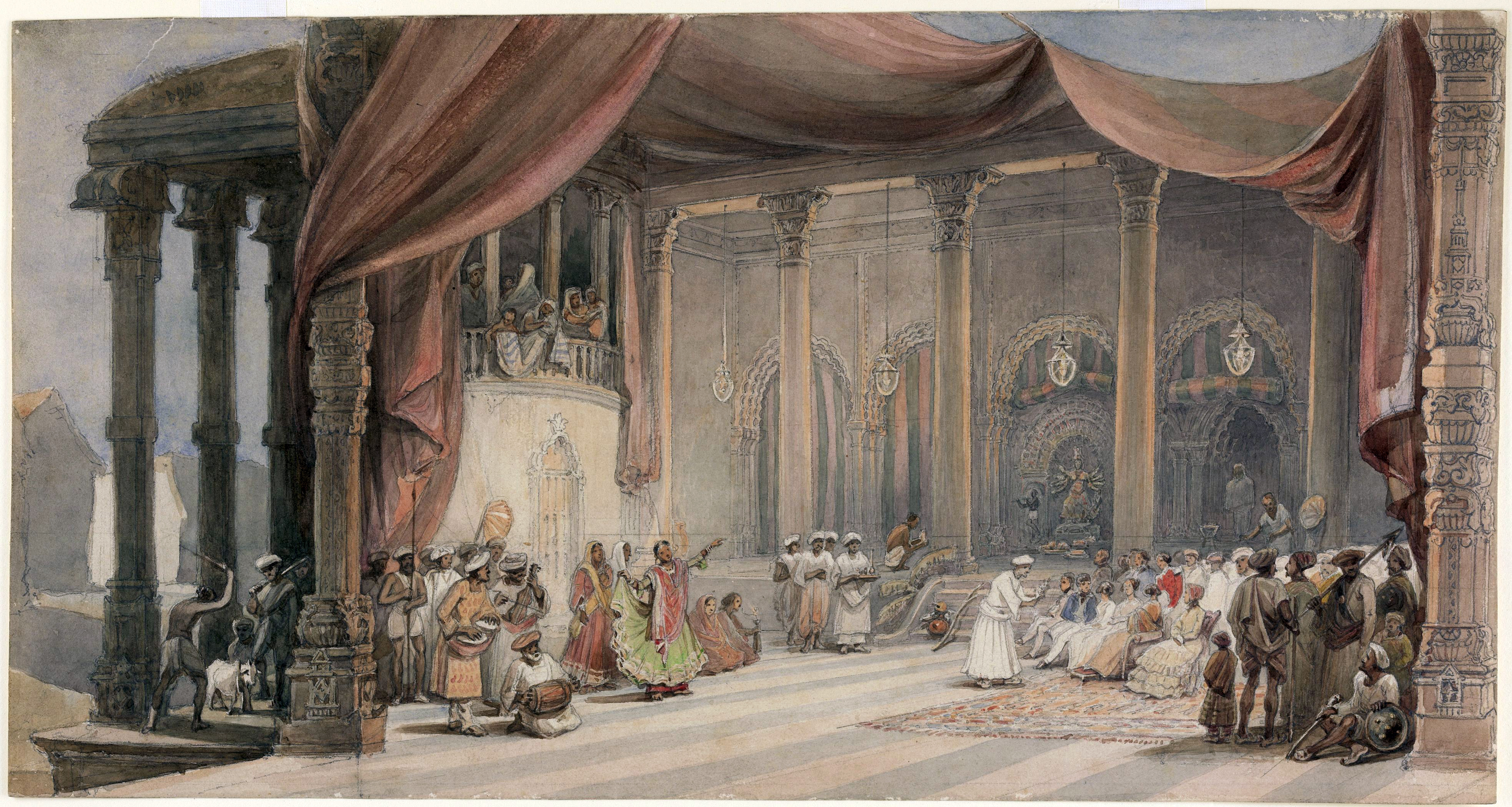
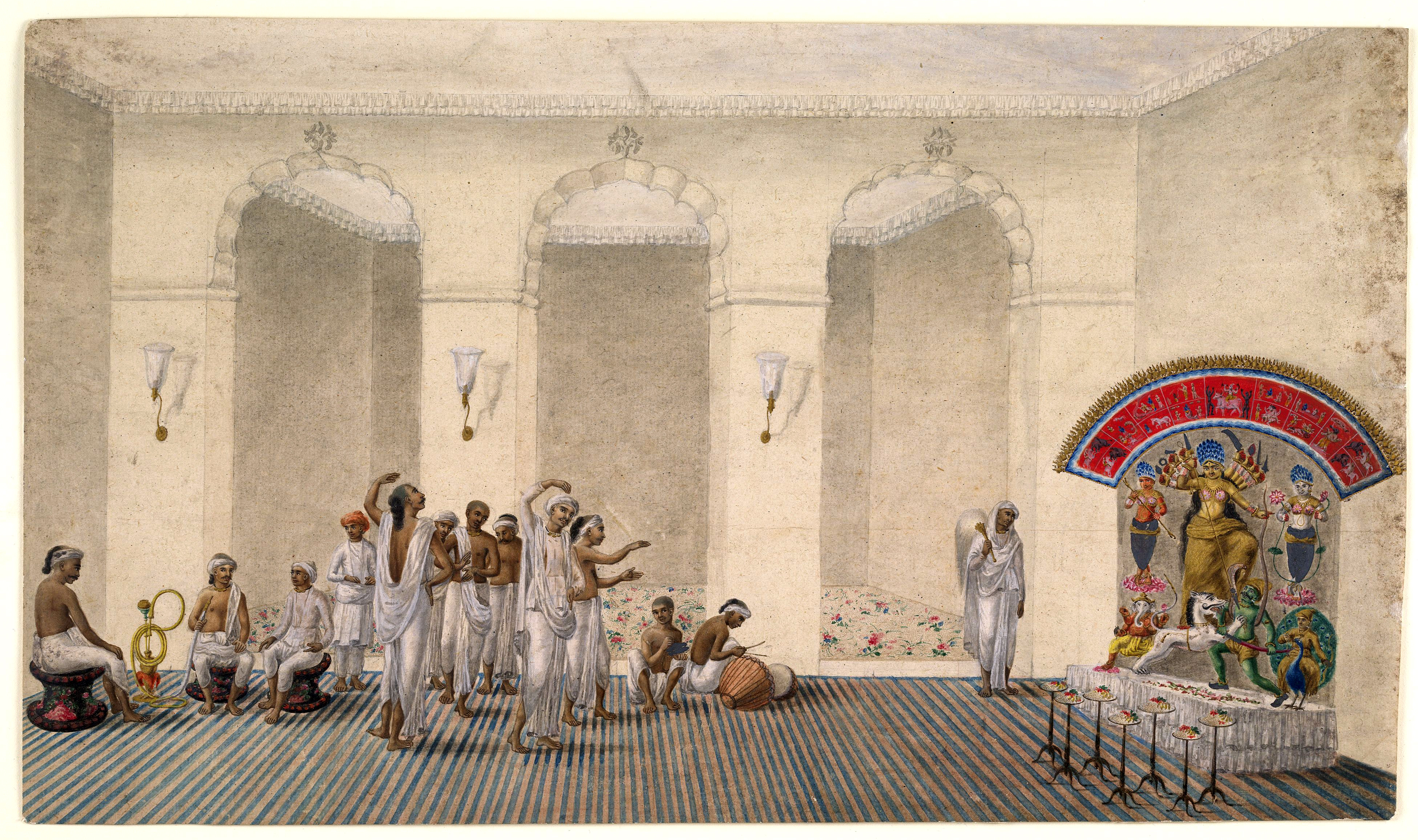
Left: Durga Puja festivities by dancers and musicians in Calcutta, circa 1830s-40s; right: Patna style painting of Durga Puja, circa 1809

Durga Puja is a widely celebrated festival in the Indian states of West Bengal, Bihar, Jharkhand, Uttar Pradesh (eastern parts), Assam, and Odisha. It is celebrated over a five-day period. Streets are decked up with festive lights, loudspeakers play festive songs as well as recitation of hymns and chants by priests, and pandals are erected by communities. The roads become overcrowded with revellers, devotees, and pandal-hoppers visiting the pandals on puja days. It often creates chaotic traffic conditions. Shops, eateries, and restaurants stay open all night; fairs are also set up and cultural programmes are held. People form organising committees, which plan and oversee the pandal during the festivities. Today, Durga Puja has turned into a consumerist social carnival, a major public spectacle and a major arts event riding on the wave of commercialisation, corporate sponsorship, and craze for award-winning. For private domestic pujas, families dedicate an area of their homes, known as thakur dalan, for Durga Puja where the sculpture-idols for worship is placed and decorated with home-dyed fabric, sola ornamentations, and gold and silver foil decorations. Elaborate rituals like arati are performed and prasad is distributed after being offered to the deities. As a tradition, married daughters visit their parents and celebrate the Durga Puja with them, a symbolism alluding to Durga who is popularly believed to return to her natal home during the puja.

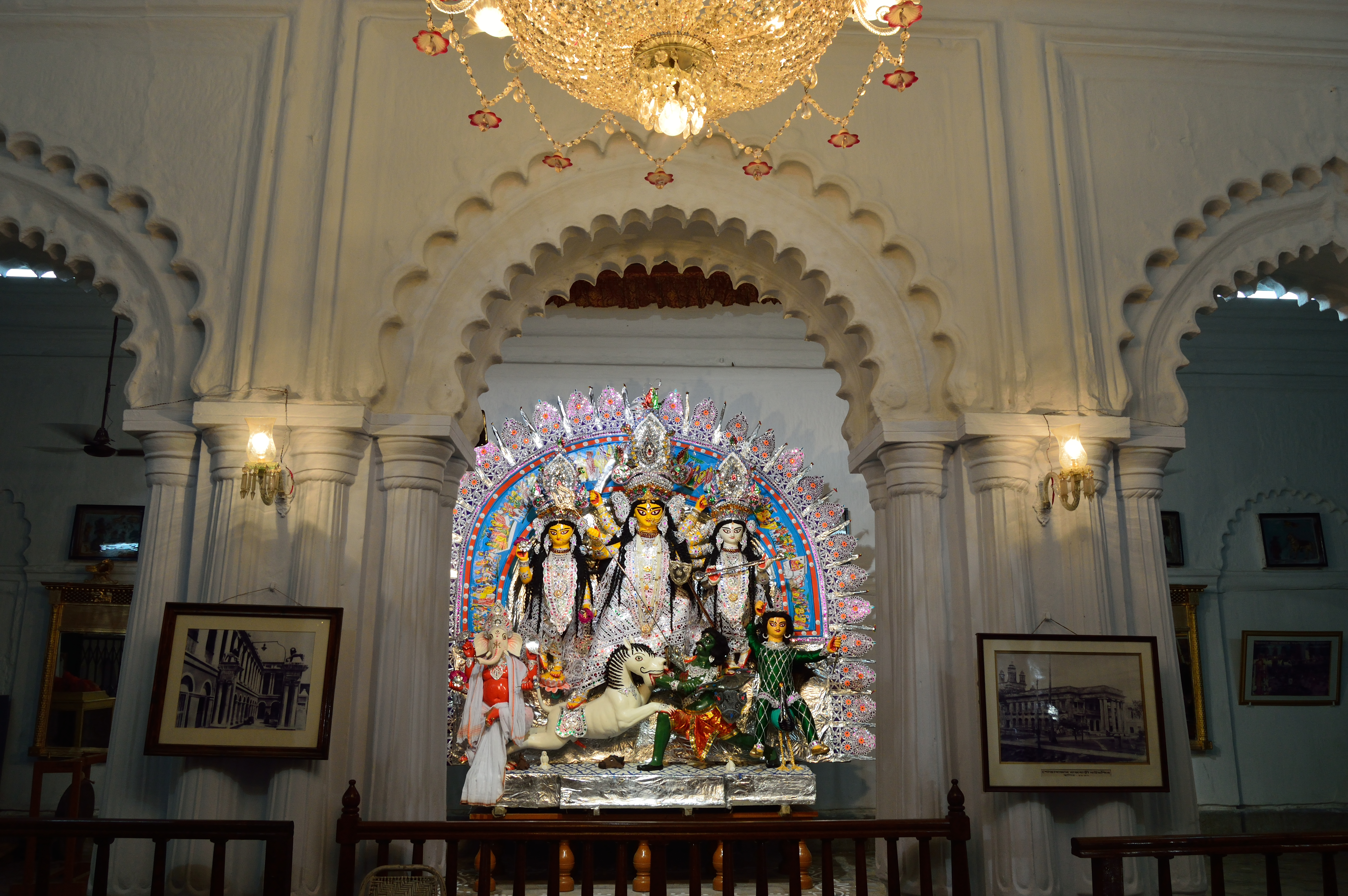
Durga Puja at the Shobhabazar Rajbari, in Kolkata, example of a bonedi puja.

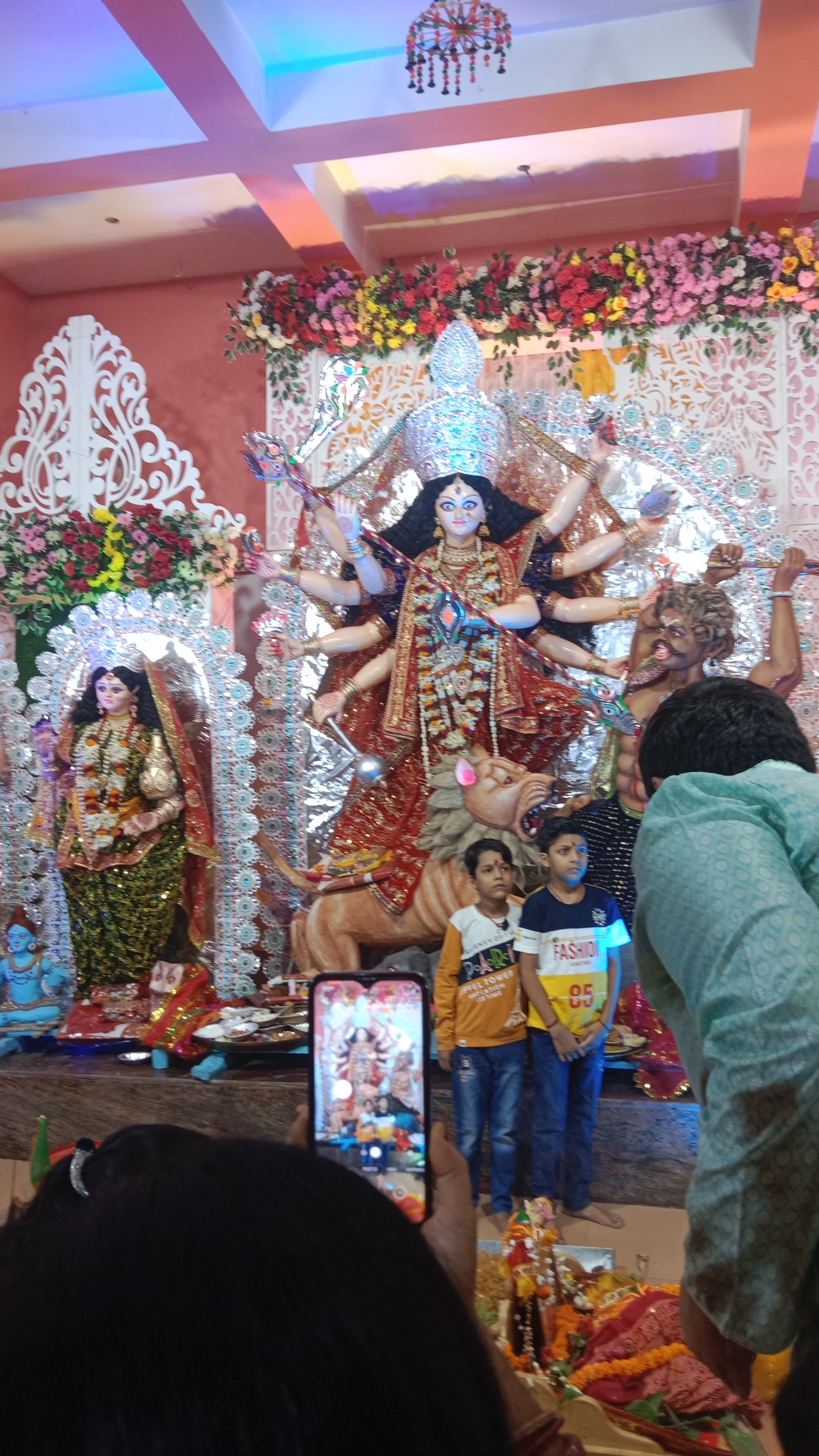
Durga Puja in Begusarai, Bihar

Durga Puja is also a gift-giving and shopping season for communities celebrating it, with people buying gifts for not only family members but also for close relatives and friends. New clothes are the traditional gift, and people wear them to go out together during Durga Puja. During puja holidays, people may also go to places of tourist attractions while others return home to spend Durga Puja with their family. It's a common trend amongst youngsters and even those who are older to go pandal-hopping and enjoy the celebrations.

The organising committees of each puja pandal hires a purohita (priest) who performs the puja rituals on behalf of the community. For the priests, Durga Puja is a time of activity wherein he pursues the timely completion of Vedic-Puranic-Tantric ritual sequences to make various offerings and perform fire oblations, in full public view, while the socio-cultural festivities occur in parallel. The complex puja rituals include periods of accurate and melodic scripture recitation. The puja involves crowds of people visiting the pandals, with smaller groups visiting family pujas, to witness the celebrations. On the last day, the sculpture-idols are carried out in immersion processions across Bengal, following which they are ritually immersed into rivers or other waterbodies. The immersion ceremony continues till a couple of days after the last day of puja.

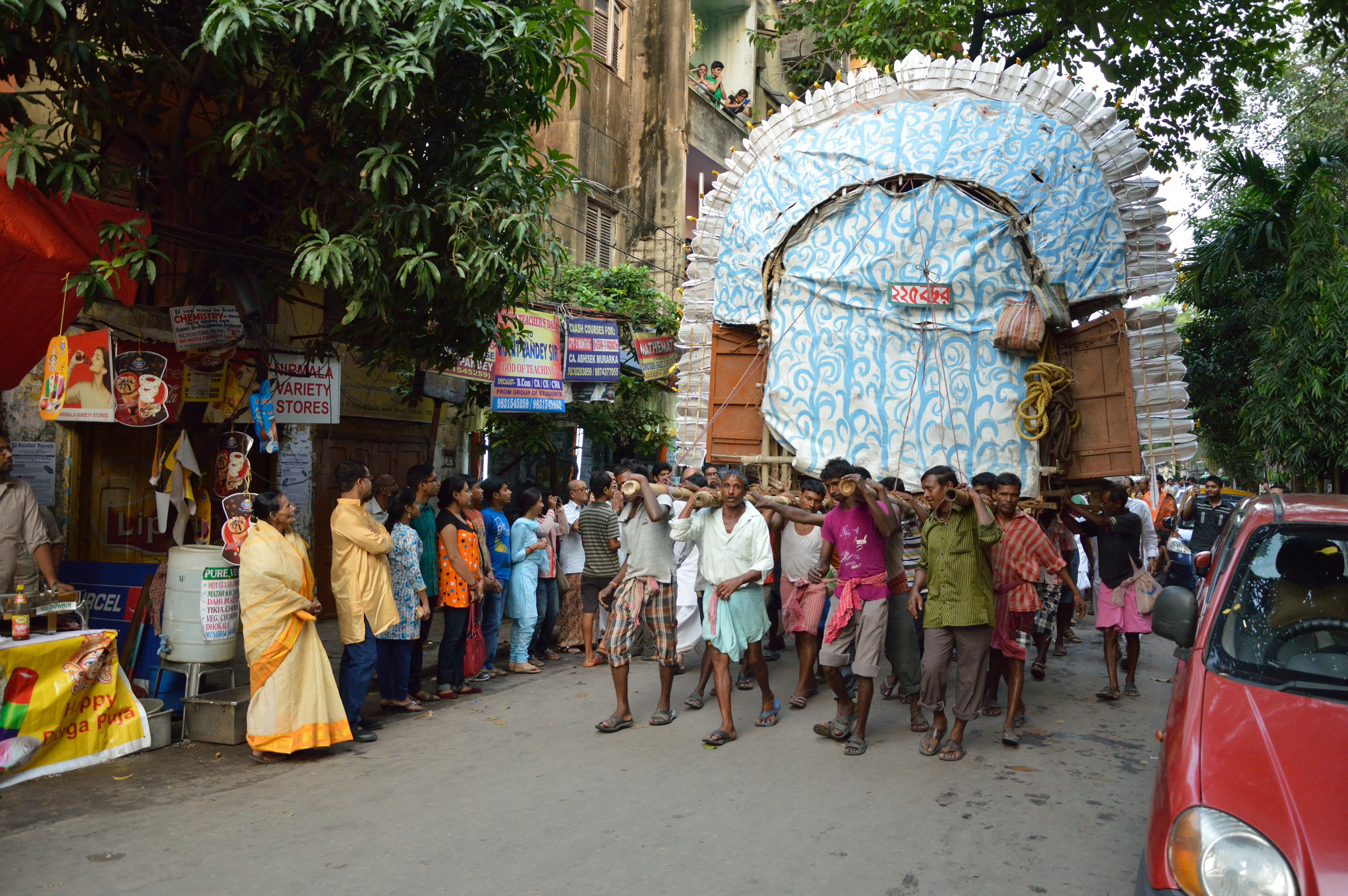
Immersion procession for Durga Puja, with the sculpture-idols being carried by people on bamboo poles.

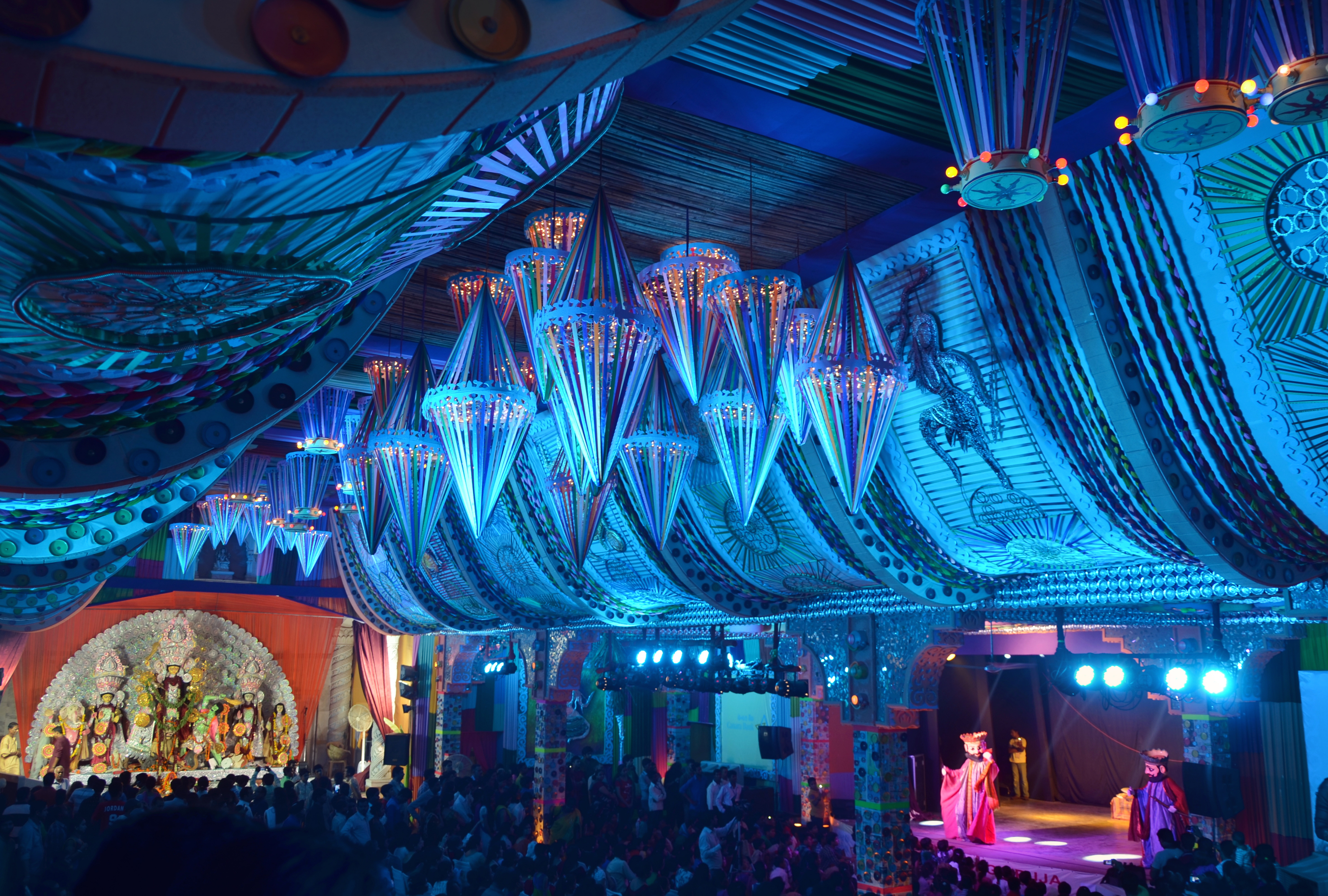
Durga Puja in New Delhi, 2014.

In Maharashtra, the city of Nashik and other places such as CIDCO, Rajeevnagar, Panchavati, and Mahatmanagar host Durga Puja celebrations. While in Delhi, the first community Durga Puja was organised near Kashmiri Gate by a group of expatriate Bengalis, in 1910, a year before Delhi was declared the capital of British India. This group came to be the Delhi Durga Puja Samiti, popularly known as the Kashmere Gate Durga Puja. The Durga Puja at Timarpur, Delhi was started in the year 1914. In 2011, over 800 Durga Pujas were held in Delhi, with a few hundred more in Gurgaon and Noida.

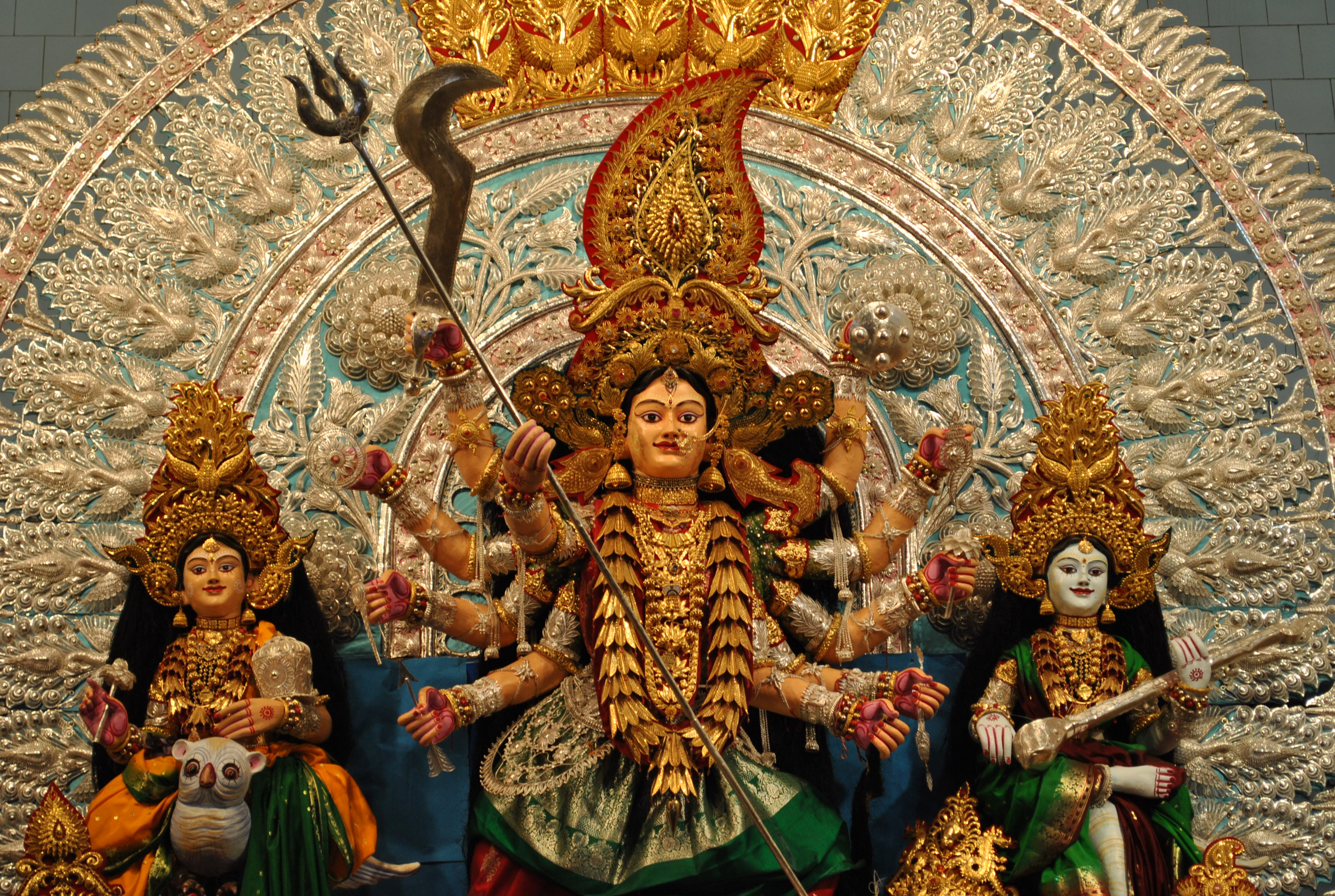
Sculpture-idols in Cuttack, Odisha for Durga Puja, bedecked with jewellery.

In Odisha, Durga Puja is celebrated over four days. People welcome the arrival of their maa by eating food, wearing new clothes, viewing pandals across the city, family gathering and gift givings. In 2019, ninety-seven pandals in Cuttack alone, Odisha were reported to bedeck respective sculpture-idols with silver jewellery for Durga Puja celebrations; such club of pandals termed regionally as Chandi Medha. The state capital is famous for the modern themes and creativity In the pandals, while the Western part of the state has a more retro decoration theme to the pandal. In the northern parts of the state particularly Balasore, Durga Puja is celebrated with much fervor and the Odia diaspora abroad especially in Australia, which originates 95% from the district of Balasore celebrates the puja in the same manner which is done back home in Balasore. In September 2019, 160 pandals were reported to be hosting Durga Puja in Cuttack.

While in Tripura there were over 2,500 community Durga Puja celebrations in 2013. Durga Puja was started at the Durgabari temple in Agartala by King Radha Kishore Manikya Bahadur.

Durga Puja and Chandi path by Maithil Brahmins in Navhath village, Madhubani, Mithila.

In Mithila, Durga Puja is one of the oldest sacred traditions of the region and is deeply associated with ancient Shakta and Tantric practices. The Karnata rulers of Mithila, whose capital was at Simraungarh (Simraun), played an important role in the development of royal Durgā worship in Mithila. The Karnata dynasty ruled Mithila from the late 11th to the early 14th century. Scholarly research on the history of Durga puja identifies the Kārṇāṭa court of Mithilā among the principal early centres of elaborate, court-sponsored autumnal worship of Durgā. C. Mackenzie Brown notes that the most elaborate surviving description of a court-sponsored Navarātra rite comes from the Kārṇāṭa and Oinwar courts of Mithilā, where the festival involved royal ceremonies, the worship of the goddess, and rituals associated with royal power. The connection with the earlier Karnata court is also discussed in Brown's research, which identifies the Kṛtyaratnākara of Caṇḍeśvara, composed in the early 14th century, as an important Maithila source for the autumnal ritual tradition and connects the later Oinwar ceremony with the ritual tradition of their Karnata predecessors. A study of Tantric religion in Mithila by Upendra Thakur likewise records a substantial Maithila ritual literature concerning the worship of Durgā and Kālī, including the Kṛtyamahārṇava, Kṛtyaratnākara, Kṛtyatattvārṇava, Durgābhaktiprakāśa, Kālanirṇaya and Pūjāratnākara. Thakur also notes the performance of nine-day observances and Durgā worship in Mithila. Thus, the Simraungarh-based Karnata rulers can be associated with the early institutionalisation and royal patronage of the autumnal Durgā puja tradition in Mithila.

During the early Panchami–Shashthi rituals, the Goddess was believed to exist in the form of mantra and spiritual energy within the Kalash rather than the idol itself, and public darshan was generally not permitted during this phase. The night of Saptami, known locally as Nisha Puja, is considered ritually significant in parts of Mithila. During this ceremony, the Goddess is ritually invoked into the idol or Kalash through Tantric rites, while the ceremonial painting of the eyes symbolizes the awakening of divine consciousness within the deity. In Mithila tradition, this moment is regarded as the point when Maa Durga fully awakens and becomes visibly manifest before devotees. The eighth and ninth days of Navaratri, Ashtami and Navami, are traditionally associated with Bali Pradan rituals, an important aspect of Mithila’s Shakta traditions.

== Significance ==
Beyond being an art festival and a socio-religious event, Durga Puja has also been a political event with regional and national political parties having sponsored Durga Puja celebrations. In 2019, West Bengal Chief Minister, Mamata Banerjee announced a grant of ₹25,000 to all community-organised Durga Pujas in the state.

In 2019, Kolkata's Durga Puja was nominated by the Indian government for the 2020 UNESCO Representative list of the Intangible Cultural Heritage of Humanity. Durga Puja also stands to be politically and economically significant. The committees organising Durga Puja in Kolkata have close links to politicians. Politicians patronise the festival by making donations or helping raise money for funding of community pujas, or by marking their presence at puja events and inaugurations. The grant of ₹25,000 to puja organising committees in West Bengal by a debt-ridden state government was reported to cost a budget a ₹70 crores. The state government also announced an additional grant of ₹5,000 to puja organising committees fully managed by women alone, while also announcing a twenty-five per cent concession on total electricity bills for puja pandal. The government had made a grant of ₹10,000 each to more than 20,000 puja organising committees in the state in 2018.

A 2013 report by ASSOCHAM states West Bengal's Durga Puja to be a ₹25,000 crores worth economy, expected to grow at the compound annual growth rate of about 35 per-cent. Economic slowdowns in India, such as in 2019, have hence affected corporate sponsorships and puja budgets for public celebrations. In August 2019, the Income Tax Department of India had allegedly sent notices to various Durga Puja organising committees in West Bengal, against which the ruling party of the state, All India Trinamool Congress (AITMC) protested. The Central Board of Direct Taxes denied sending any such notices, to which AITMC politician Madan Mitra is reported to have said that the intention may have been to enquire if tax deducted at source had been deducted on payments to vendors for organising community pujas.

=== Economic significance ===
Durga Puja directly affects the economy. A 2019 study by the British Council estimated the economic value of creative industries associated with Durga Puja in West Bengal at ₹32,377 crores (2.6% of the state's GDP in that financial year). In 2022, the economy of West Bengal was estimated to get a boost of 50,000 crore rupees. The annual GDP of West Bengal was expected to be expanded by 20-30 per cent that year. The factors responsible for this economic boost are mainly the increase of earning in transport, tourism, industry, business, shopping and other fields. The Kolkata Metro Railway recorded an earning of ₹6 crore in just five days of Durga Puja in 2022.

Major community pandals often receive corporate sponsorships to fund their construction, decorative lighting, and ornamentation for the idols.

=== Social significance ===
Durga Puja plays a great significance in the living of certain peoples. The kumors, those who make the idols with clay and also makes other clay products, earns lakhs of rupees by selling a single set of Durga idol of average size. Hence, it makes their annual income because idols used in other festivals are much cheaper. Other professions that receive the majority of their annual income are dhaaki (plays dhaak), priest and other small homecrafts. It is assumed that these profession based small classes would become smaller in population if Durga Puja was absent.

=== Media attention ===
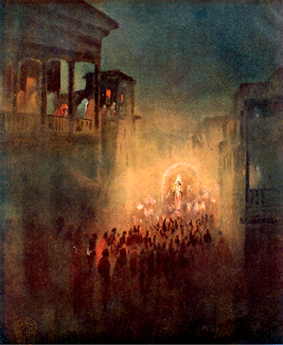
Durga Puja has been a theme in various artistic works such as movies, paintings, and literature. Shown here is Pratima Visarjan by Gaganendranath Tagore, depicting a Durga Puja immersion procession.

The day of Mahalaya is marked by the Indian Hindu community of West Bengal with Mahishasuramardini — a two-hours long All India Radio program — that has been popular in the Bengali Hindu community since the 1950s. While in earlier days it used to be recorded live, a pre-recorded version has come to be broadcast in recent decades. Bengali Hindus traditionally wake up at four in the morning on Mahalaya to listen to the radio show, primarily involving recitations of chants and hymns from Devi Mahatmyam (or Chandi Path) by Birendra Krishna Bhadra and Pankaj Kumar Mullick. The show also features various devotional melodies.

Dramas enacting the legend of Durga slaying Mahishasura are telecasted on the television. Radio and television channels also air other festive shows, while Bengali and Odia magazines publish special editions for the puja known as Pujabarshiki (Annual Puja Edition) or Sharadiya Sankhya (Autumnal Volume). These contain works of writers, both established and upcoming, and are more voluminous than the regular issues. Some notable examples of such magazines in Bengali are Anandamela, Shuktara, Desh, Sananda, Nabakallol, and Bartaman.

== Celebrations outside South Asia ==
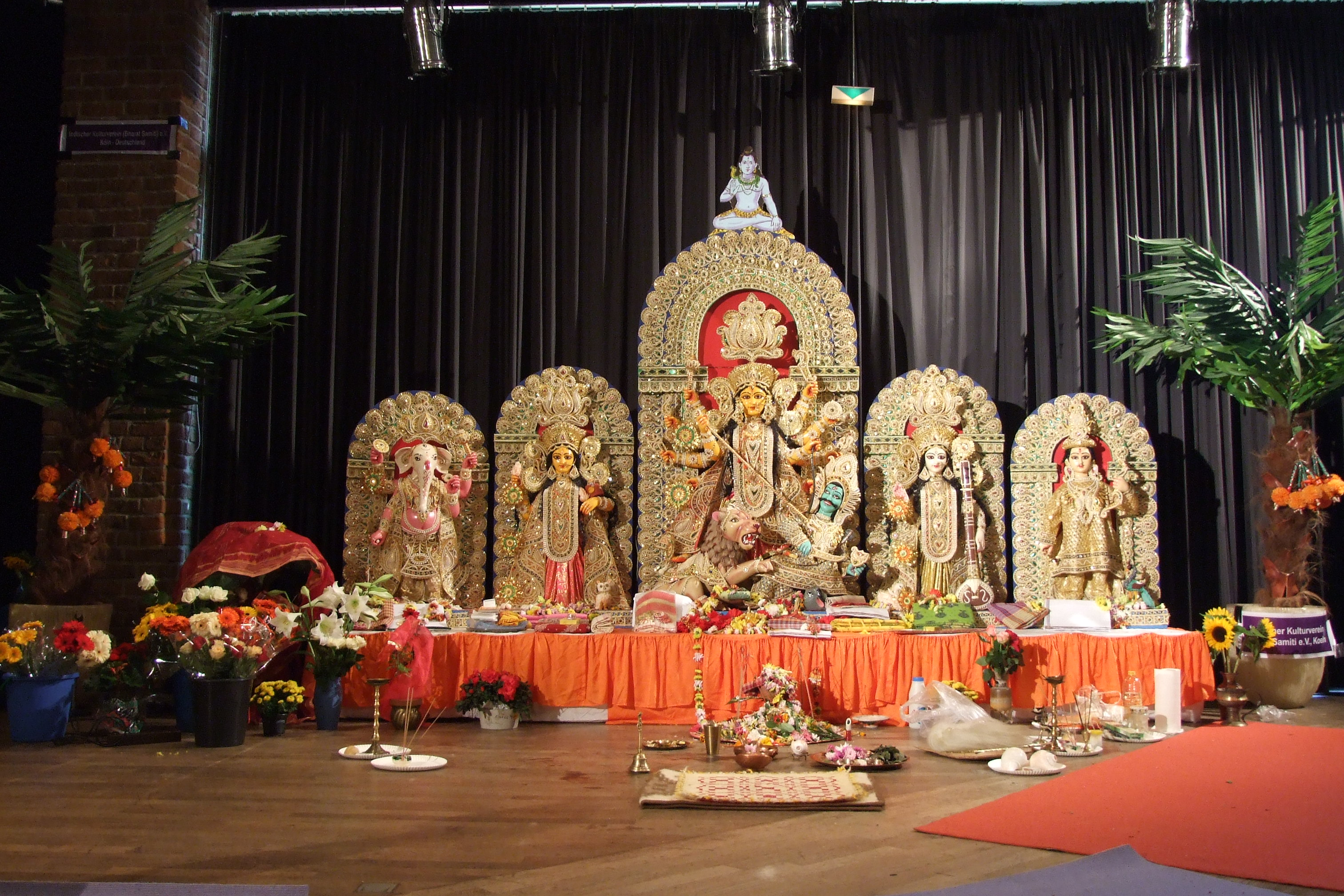
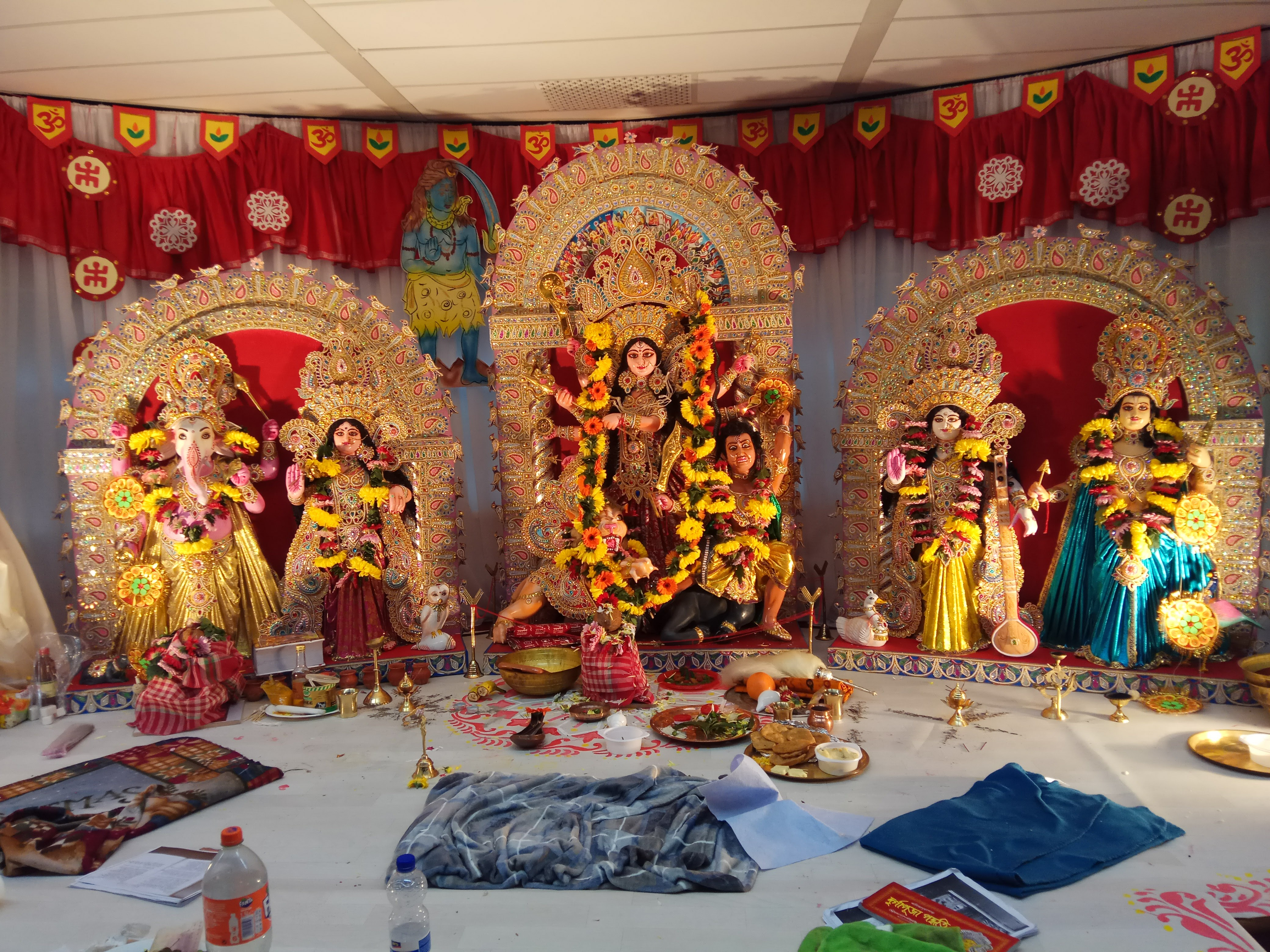
Left: Durga Puja in Germany, in 2009; Right: Durga Puja in the Netherlands, in 2017.

=== North America ===
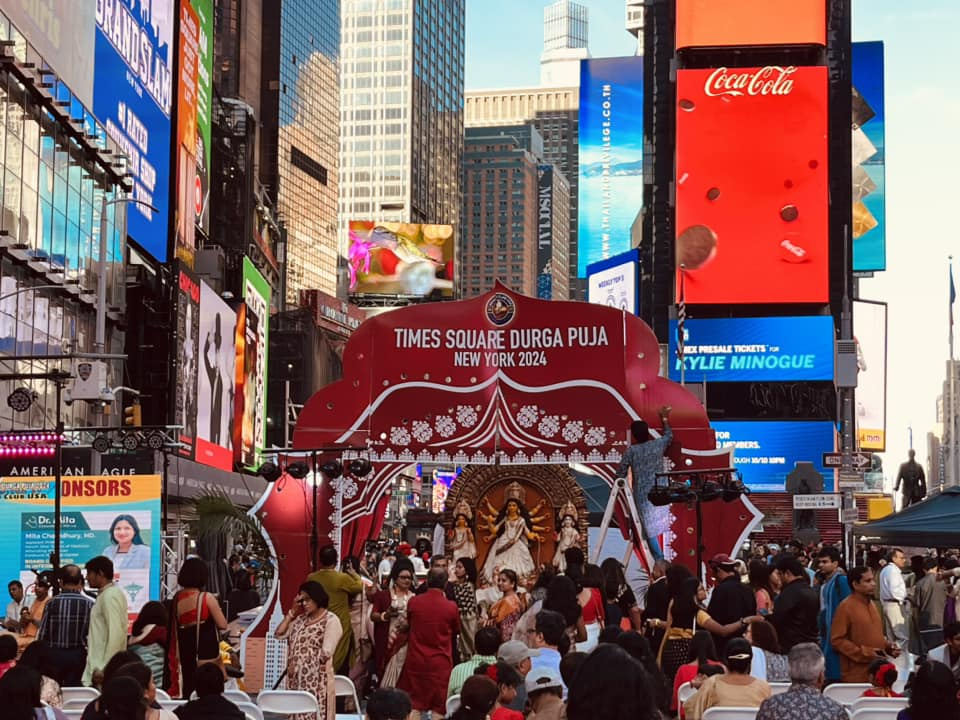
Durga Puja celebrations at Times Square by Bengali Hindu Americans

In the United States Durga Puja is celebrated across the country in many cities. The oldest community Durga Puja in the US was held in Columbia University organised by the East Coast Durga Puja Association (ECDPA) in 1970. While many community pujas are typically held over a Friday-Sunday period, some pujas in the US e.g. organised by Bharat Sevashram Shangha, Paschimi, Women's Now and others follow the full 5 day schedule. While most major metropolitan centers have multiple Durga Pujas organised by multiple Bengali Hindu organisations, Saikat in San Diego, Aikotaan in Orange County, CA, SABCC CA in San Antonio, TX, and the Bengali Association of Greater Chicago (BAGC), are four of the biggest American cities/ counties to have an unified Durga Pujas for the whole metropolitan area. In addition to the actual puja, most Durga Pujas in North America have a tradition of having elaborate cultural events involving both local artists and invited professional artists from India.

In Canada, Bengali Hindu communities both from Bangladesh and West Bengal, India organise several Durga Pujas. Greater Toronto Area has the most Durga Puja celebration venues organised by different Bengali Hindu cultural groups such as Bangladesh Canada Hindu Cultural Society (BCHCS), Bongo Poribar Sociocultural Association zetc. City of Toronto has a dedicated Durga Temple named Toronto Durgabari where Durga Puja is organised along with other Hindu celebrations. Most of the puja venues of Toronto area try to arrange the puja in the best way possible to follow the lunar calendar and timings.

=== South America ===
In Brazil, The Swami Vivekananda Cultural Center, São Paulo, organises an annual Durga Puja.

=== Europe ===
Celebrations are also organised in Europe. The sculpture-idols are shipped from India and stored in warehouses to be re-used over the years. According to BBC News, for community celebrations in London in 2006, these "idols, belonging to a tableau measuring 18ft by 20ft, were made from clay, straw and vegetable dyes". At the end of the puja, the sculpture-idols were immersed in River Thames for the first time in 2006, after "the community was allowed to give a traditional send-off to the deities by London's port authorities". In Germany, the puja is celebrated in Cologne, and other cities. In Switzerland, puja in Baden, Aargau has been celebrated since 2003. In Sweden, the puja is celebrated in cities such as Stockholm and Helsingborg. The oldest and first puja in Sweden was founded in 1988 and is one of the oldest ones in Europe, and goes by the name Stockholm Bangiya Sanatan Samaj. In the Netherlands, the puja is celebrated in places such as Amstelveen, Eindhoven, and Voorschoten.

=== Africa ===
In South Africa, Durga Puja has been revived with celebrations in Johannesburg. In Ethiopia, in Addis Ababa Durga Puja is organised by the Addis Ababa Durga Pooja Committee. Durga Puja celebrations are also held in Tema, Ghana, which is organised by the Bengalis in Ghana.

=== Australia ===
In Sydney, Durga Puja is celebrated in many community centers including at the Ponds Community Hub in Sydney where the Bengali Community Dorpon Cultural and Religious Association organised Durga Puja

=== Asia outside the subcontinent ===
Durga Puja celebrations have also been started in Hong Kong by the Bengali Hindu diaspora. In China Durga Puja has been organised in Shanghai and is organised by the Embassy of India in Beijing In Japan, Durga Puja is celebrated in Tokyo with much fanfare.
