= Maithil Upanayan =

Ceremonial upanayan of Maithils

Maithil Upanayan is a ceremonial upanayan sanskar practised in the Mithila region of the Indian subcontinent by the Maithil Brahmins and Maithil Kayastha in the region. It is a Vedic religious ceremony. In the Mithila region, Upanayan is also known as Jenaoo Sanskar. The tradition of Upanayan sanskar in the Mithila region among the Maithil Brahmins and Maithil Kayastha varies from other parts of the subcontinent. It has some unique and special rituals. In the tradition of the Maithil Brahmin community, a child is not considered a Brahmin from birth. Only after the completion of the upanayan ceremony is the child confirmed as a Brahmin. Before it, he has the status of Barua or Batuka. During the upanayan rituals, several folk songs in the Maithili language are sung by the women of the family, relatives and neighbours. The Maithil Upanayan takes more than a week to complete its ceremonial rituals. It initially starts with Baskatti and Marabthatthi rituals and ends with Jenau and Jaga rituals. It is conducted only on an auspicious day (Subh Din) as suggested by the Mithila Panchang published by the Kameshwar Singh Darbhanga Sanskrit University in the Mithila region.

== Description ==
=== Baskatti ===
In the Mithila region, the upanayan sanskar is conducted for a male child. The male child whose upanayan sanskar is going to be conducted is called Baruaa. The first day of the Maithil Upanayan ceremony is known as Udog. On this day, the Barua applies pithar (paste made of rice flour) and vermilion to five bamboo trees. Then the bamboo trees are cut by the elders and brought to the courtyard of the family. The ritual of cutting the bamboo trees is called Baaskatti. These bamboos are used in making marwa (hut), where the Upanayan rituals will be conducted in the courtyard.

After the Baskatti ritual, the next ritual is Udog Marabthaththi for the construction of the marwa.

=== Matkor and Matimangal ===
After the Udog Marabthaththi, on the upcoming Tuesday, the Matimangal ritual is held, in which soil is brought from a farm or pond for the construction of the marwa. The sacred ceremony of digging soil from the farm or pond is called Matkor. During the Matkor ceremony, the barua's mother covers her beloved son with her veil, and along with his grandmother, aunts, and other female relatives, they sing folk songs and perform the ritual of digging the earth for soil. After that, a few women gather together at the Mandap to spin the spinning wheel (Charkha) and prepare yarn. This activity is known as Charkh Katti. The yarn is used to make the sacred thread Janeu. On the upanayana day, the Baruaa wears the sacred thread prepared from this very yarn.

=== Kumaram ===
The next ritual is Kumaram. After the ritual, Kumaram bhoj is organised, in which Kumari Kanyas (unmarried girls) are fed with delicious Kheer, puri, sweets, etc. The relatives of the family and people from the neighbourhood are also invited to take the prasad of the Kumaram bhoj. It is organised on a day prior to the main ritual of Janeu Sanskar on Upanayan day. The items of food in Kumaram bhoj differ according to the nature of Kuldevi/Kuldevta of the family. It is generally vegetarian food, but in some families, on this day, a goat is sacrificed to the Kuldevi of the family as an offering. And at evening, a feast is held with cooked meat of the goat sacrificed as an offering, in dishes along with other food items. At the end of the bhoj, curd is mandatorily served in the dishes.

=== Janeu Sanskar (Upanayan day) ===
On the last day, the main rituals of the Janeu Sanskar are conducted. These include Aam Mahua Vivah, Matrika Puja, removal of hair from the head of the Barua/Batuk, and wearing the sacred thread Janeu, etc. During the Matrika Puja, the Acharya invokes Goddess Bhagwati by performing Vedic chantings. After that, the ancestors are invoked with dhoti, saree, barley, kusha and fruits. Then, the Chuda Karam ritual is performed, in which the Baruaa's Shikha is pierced and it is tied to Jutika Bandhan with curd and mango leaves. After that, Vedic mantras are chanted and major rituals are performed and the sacred thread Janeu is worn on the body of the Baruaa. After wearing the sacred thread Janeu, the Baruaa beggs alms from his mother and relatives. The ritual of begging alms is known as Bhikhair. After the Bhikhair rituals, the designated Acharya teaches the Baruaa to recite the Vedas. On this day, hajaam (barber) removes hair from the head of the Baruaa. Finally, the Barua is declared to the status of Brahmin. He is given to wear new clothes brought from the maternal grandfather village. After that the ritual of Chumawan is conducted in which five elder male married Brahmins chant the Durwakshat Mantra for blessings the new declared young Brahmin.

During the Upanayana ceremony, the young Brahmin used to wear Kharaam instead of modern sandals. The Kharaam is a traditional wooden sandal used by Brahmin scholars in the early times of the region.

=== Ratim ===
In the Maithil Upanayan, Ratim is a ritual conducted after the Janeu Sanskar. In this ritual, the child's cut hair is immersed in a bamboo grove locally called as basbitti.

== Brahmin Bhoj ==
In the evening or early night of the Upanayana day, a grand Brahmin Bhoj is organised in the courtyard of the family. In the Brahmin Bhoj feast, a large number of Brahmins are invited. They are served several food items, including Chura-Dahi, rasgulla, gulab jamun, seasonal vegetables and other sweets, etc.

== Music, tunes and songs ==
During the ceremony of the Maithil Upanayan, the women of the family and relatives sing Maithili folk songs related to the rituals and procedures. Similarly, the family invite artists of Rasan Chauki for playing Mangal Dhun during the entire ceremony.

View of the musical play of Rasan Chauki at the Jageshwar Gaachhi in the village of Basuki Bihari in Mithila. The folk musical instruments was played on the occasion of the Baskatti ritual.

== Gallery ==
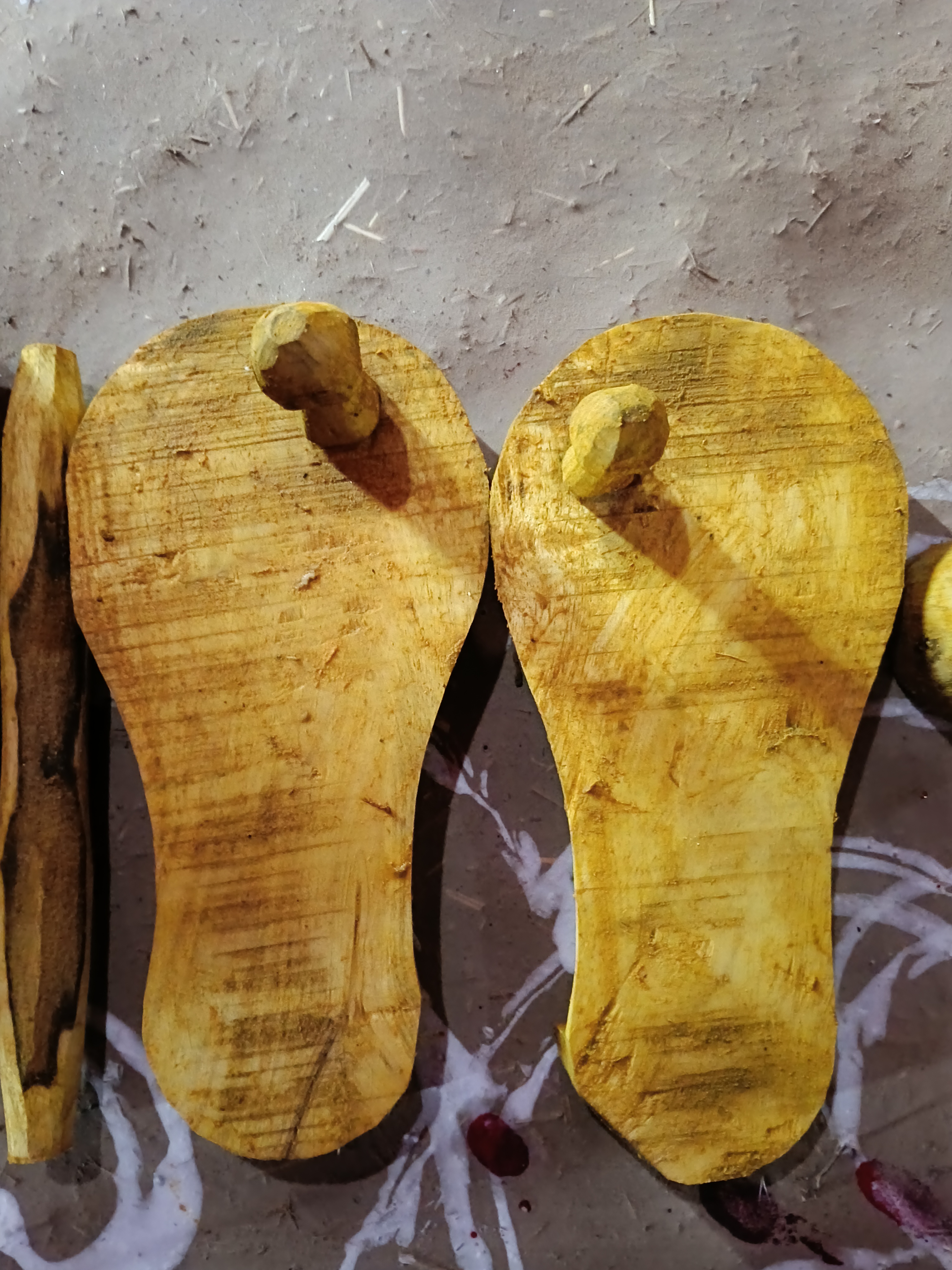
A pair of Kharaam (wood sandle) used by the young declared Brahmin during the Upanayana rituals.

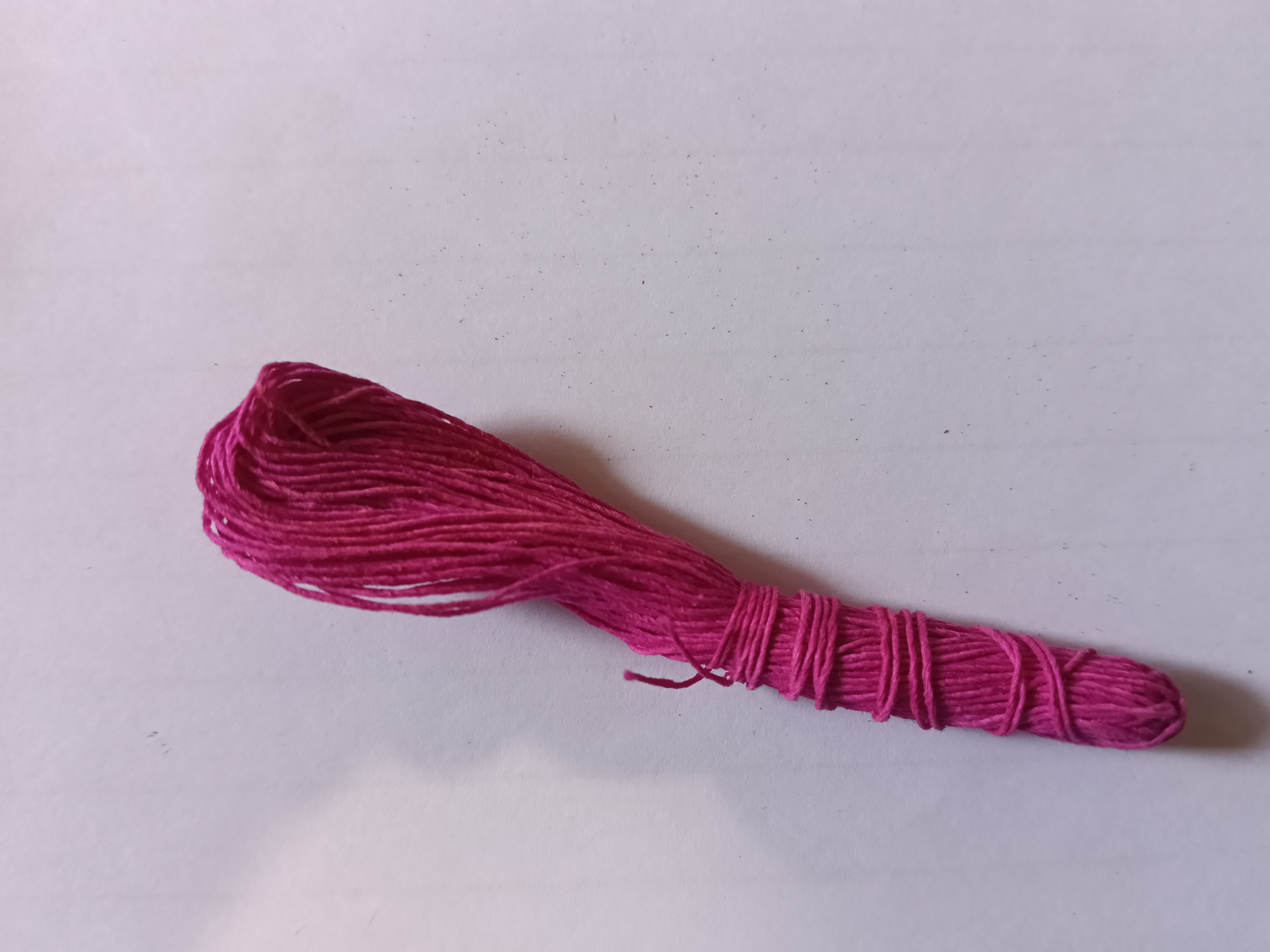
Image of the sacred thread Janeu worn by a Maithil Brahmin after Upanayana sanskar

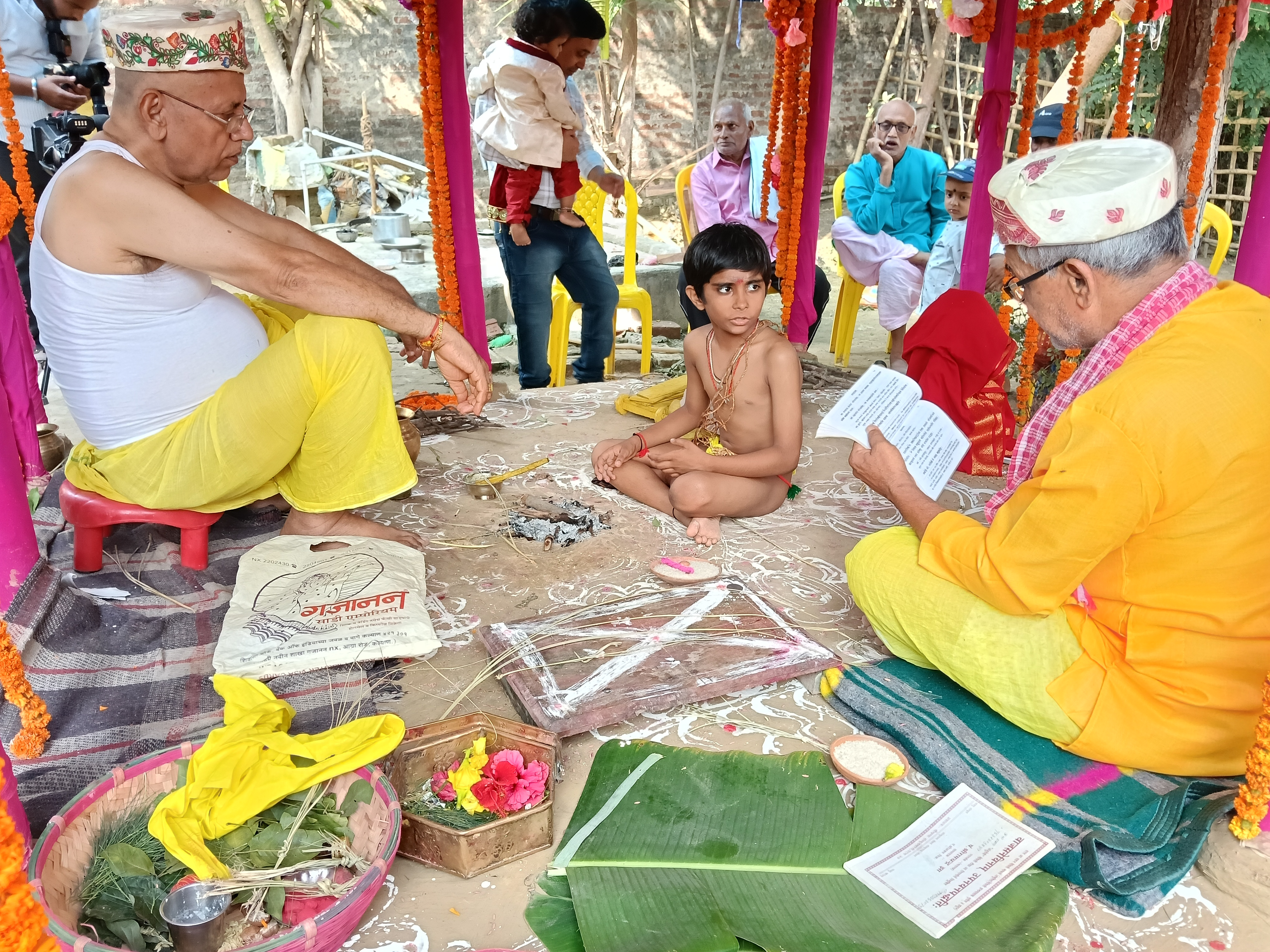
Maithil Upanayan Sanskar in Mithila region

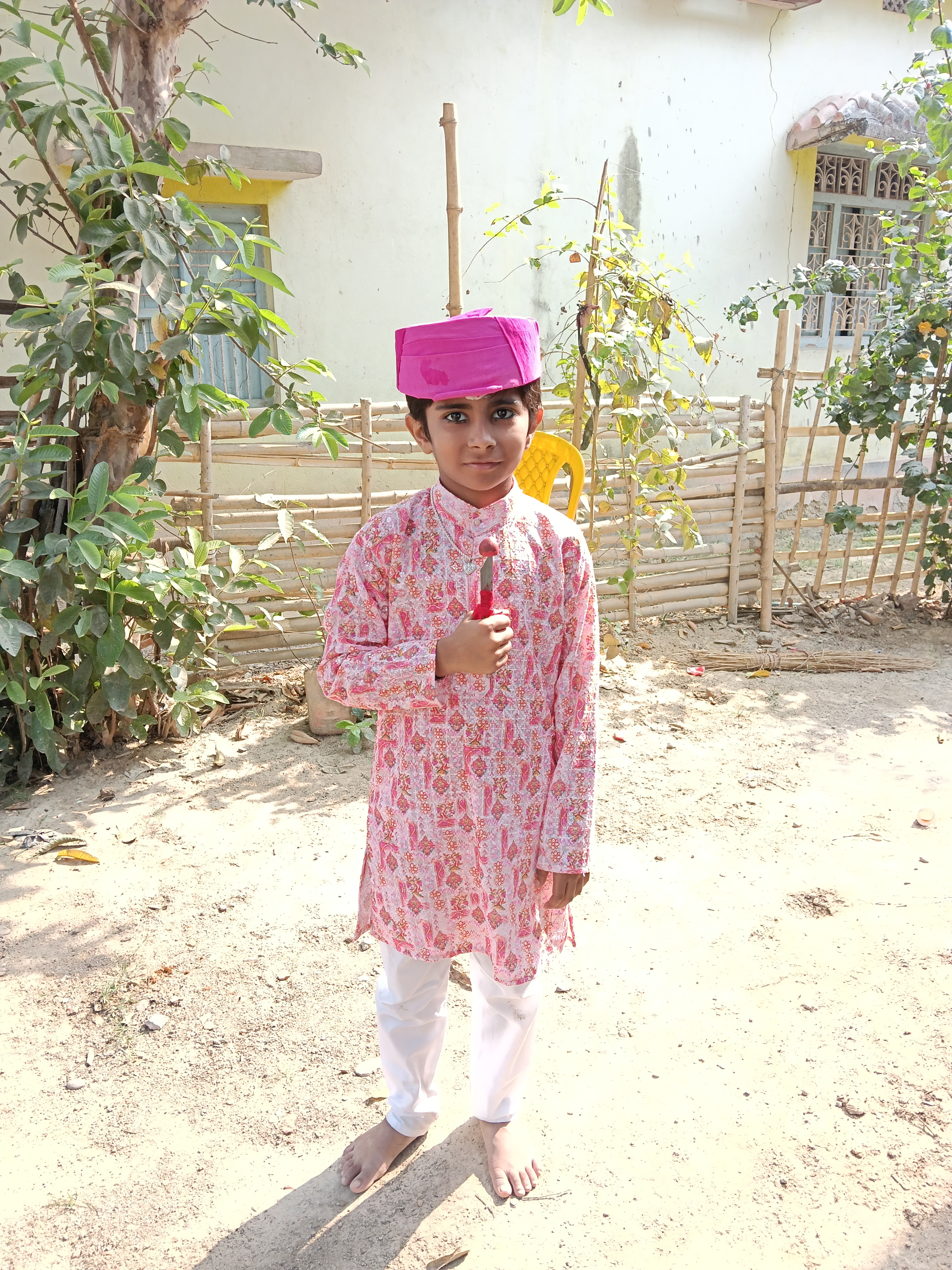
Maithil Baruaa or Batuka

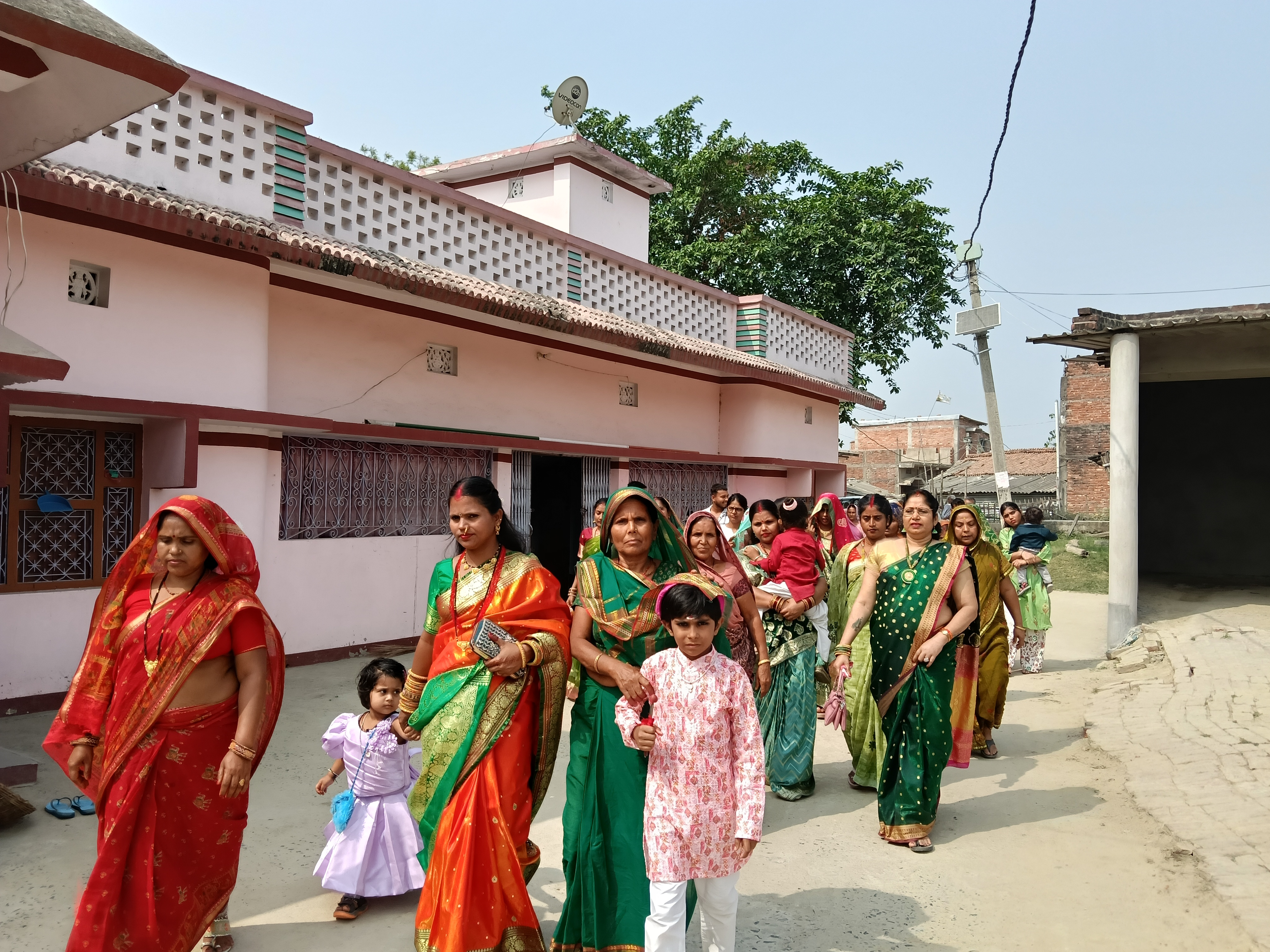
Procession for Baskatti ritual

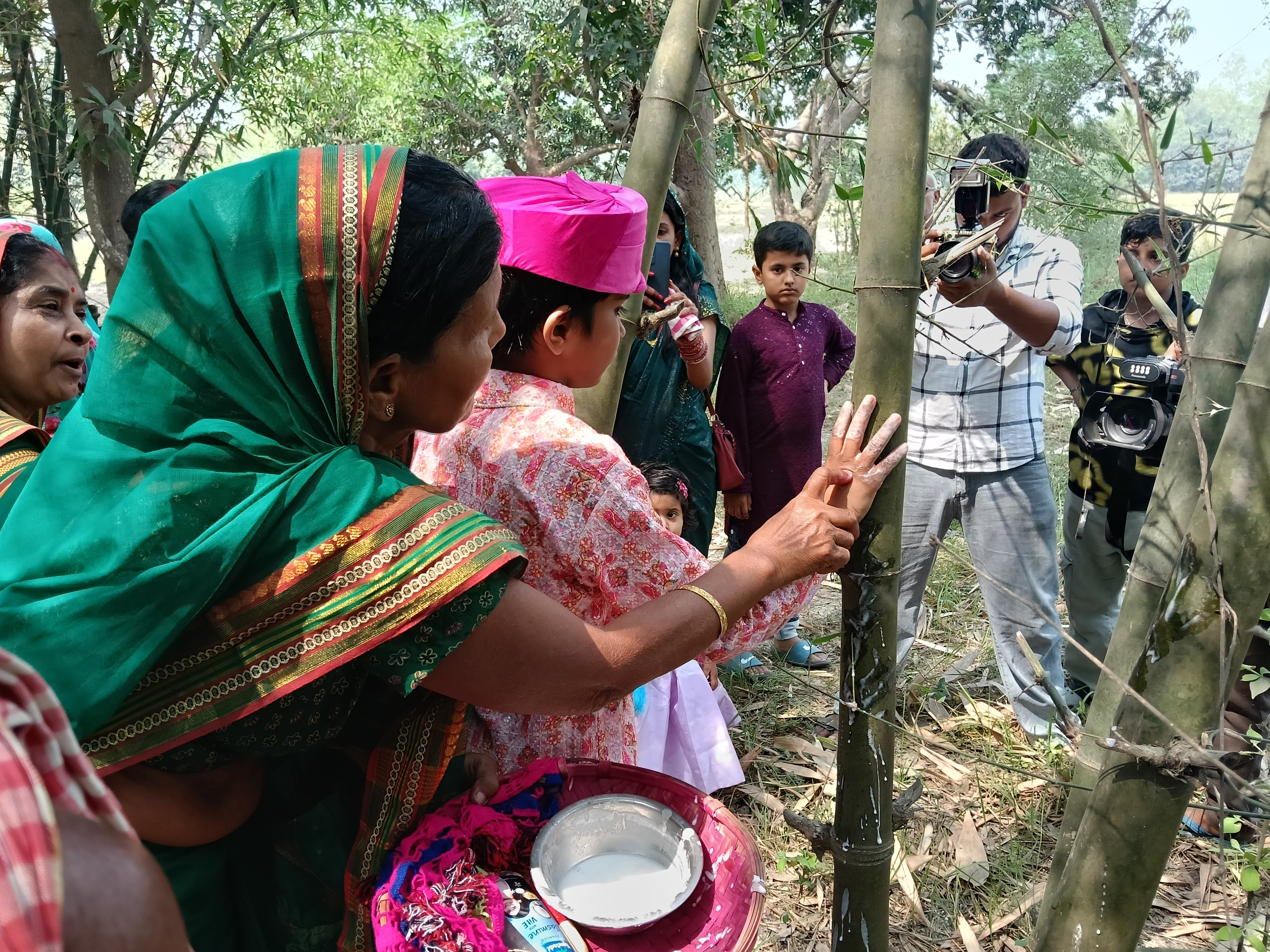
Ritual of Baskatti

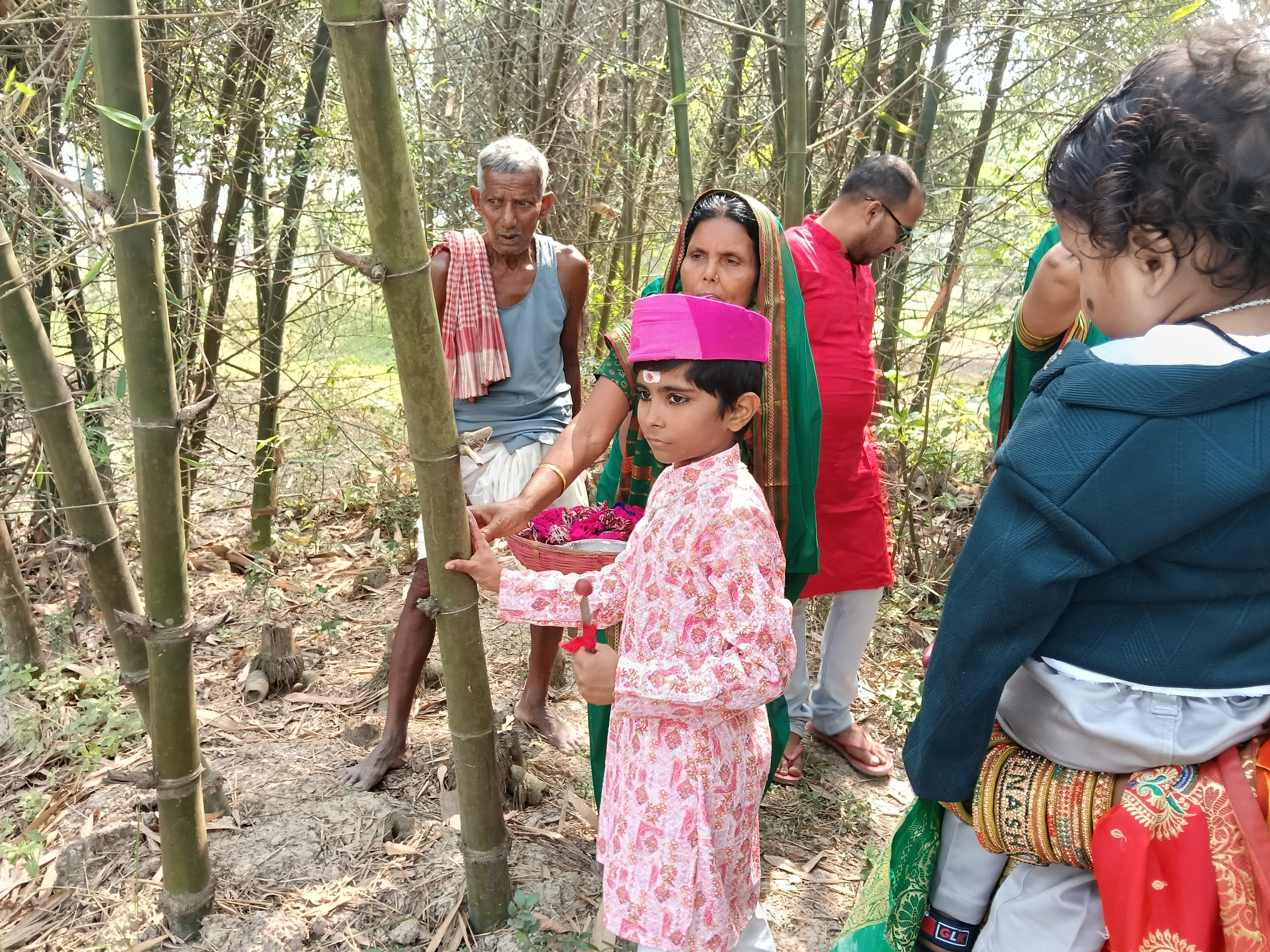
Applying pithar and vermilion on a bamboo tree by the barua during Baskatti ritual

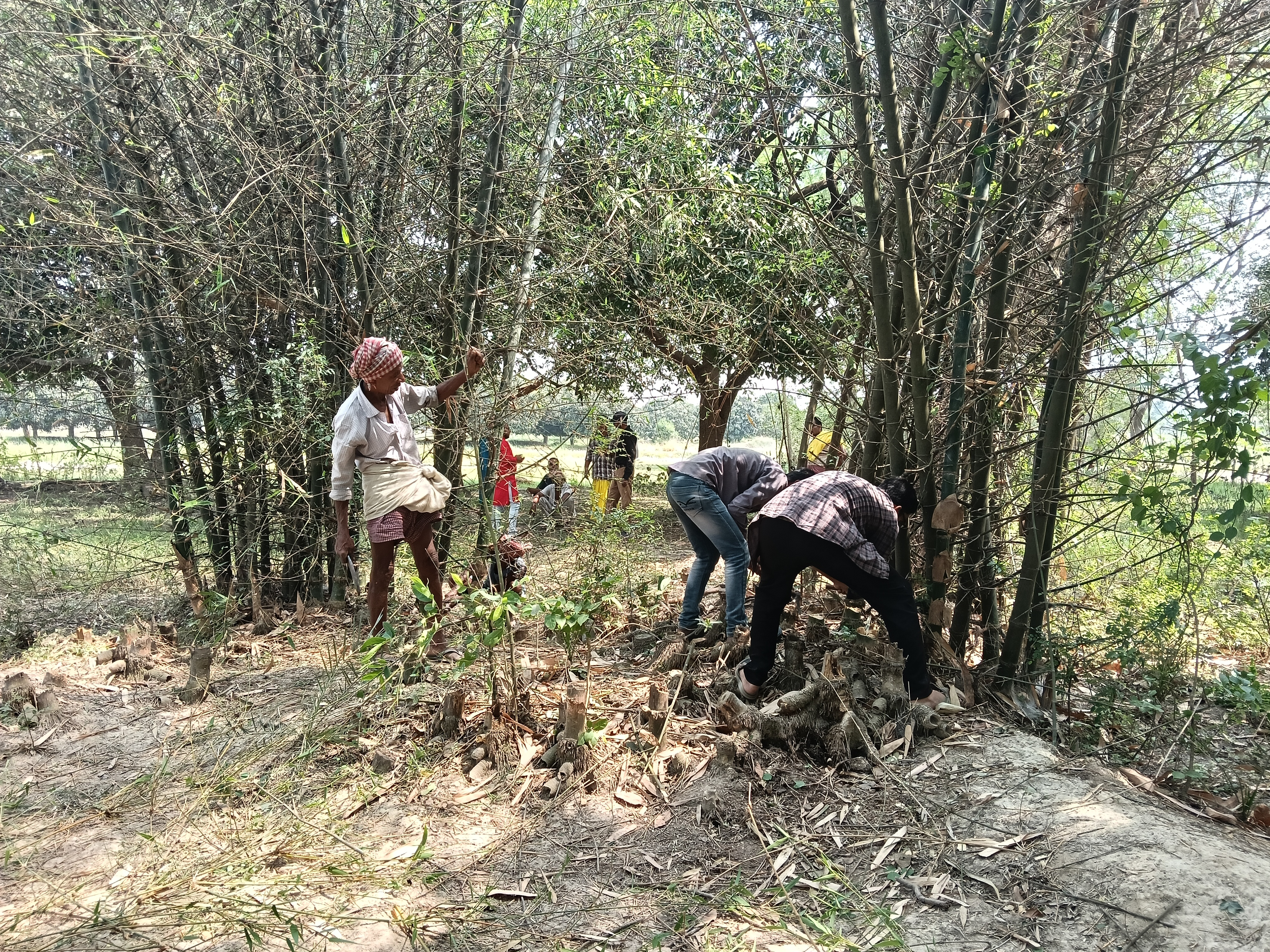
Cutting of bamboo trees by elders at a bamboo grove locally called basbitti

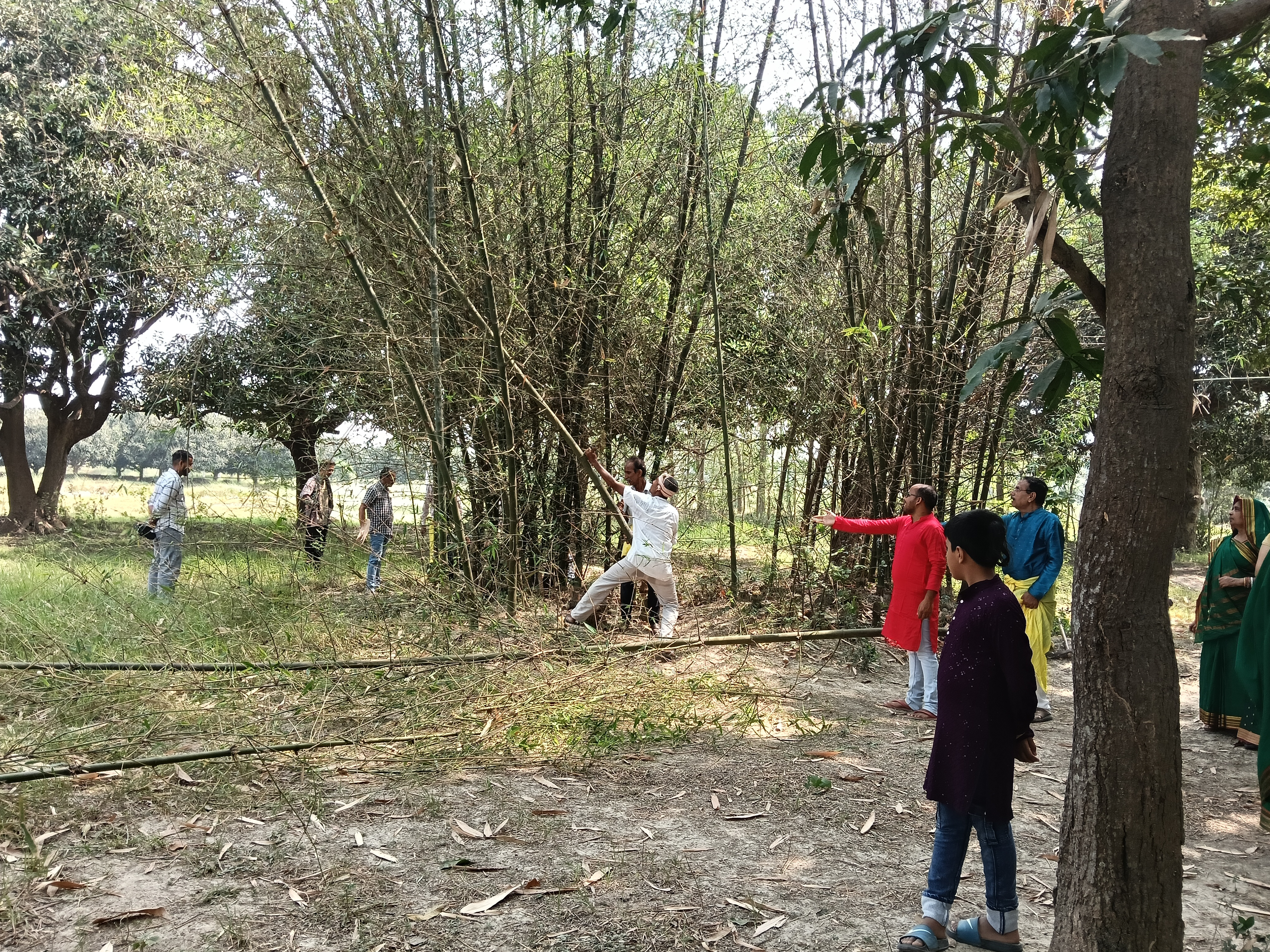
Process of Baskatti ritual

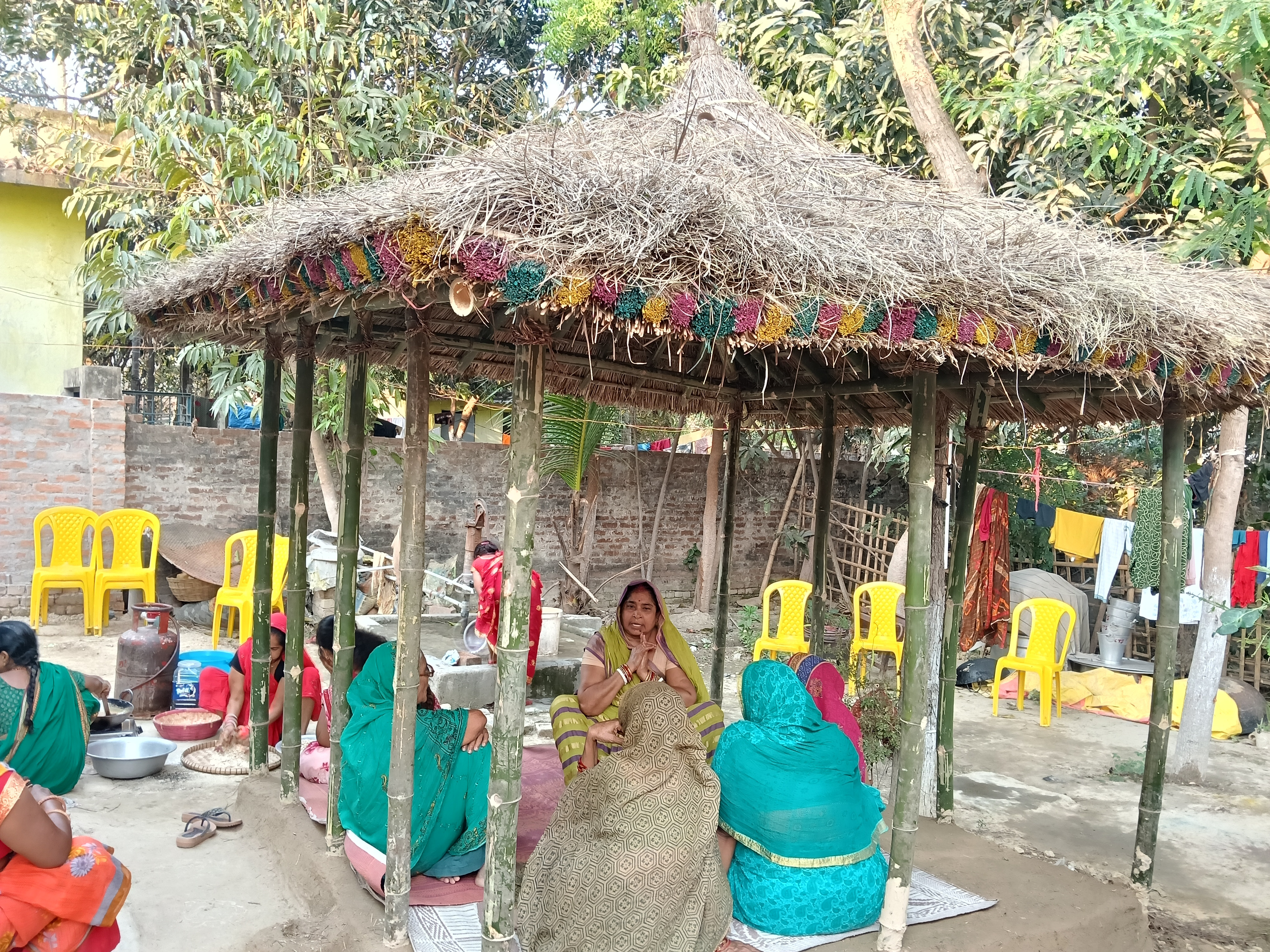
View of a Maithil Brahmin Upanayana Sanskar Marwa (Mandap) at Basuki Bihari in Mithila. In the photo Maithil Brahmin women are singing Brahman Geet.

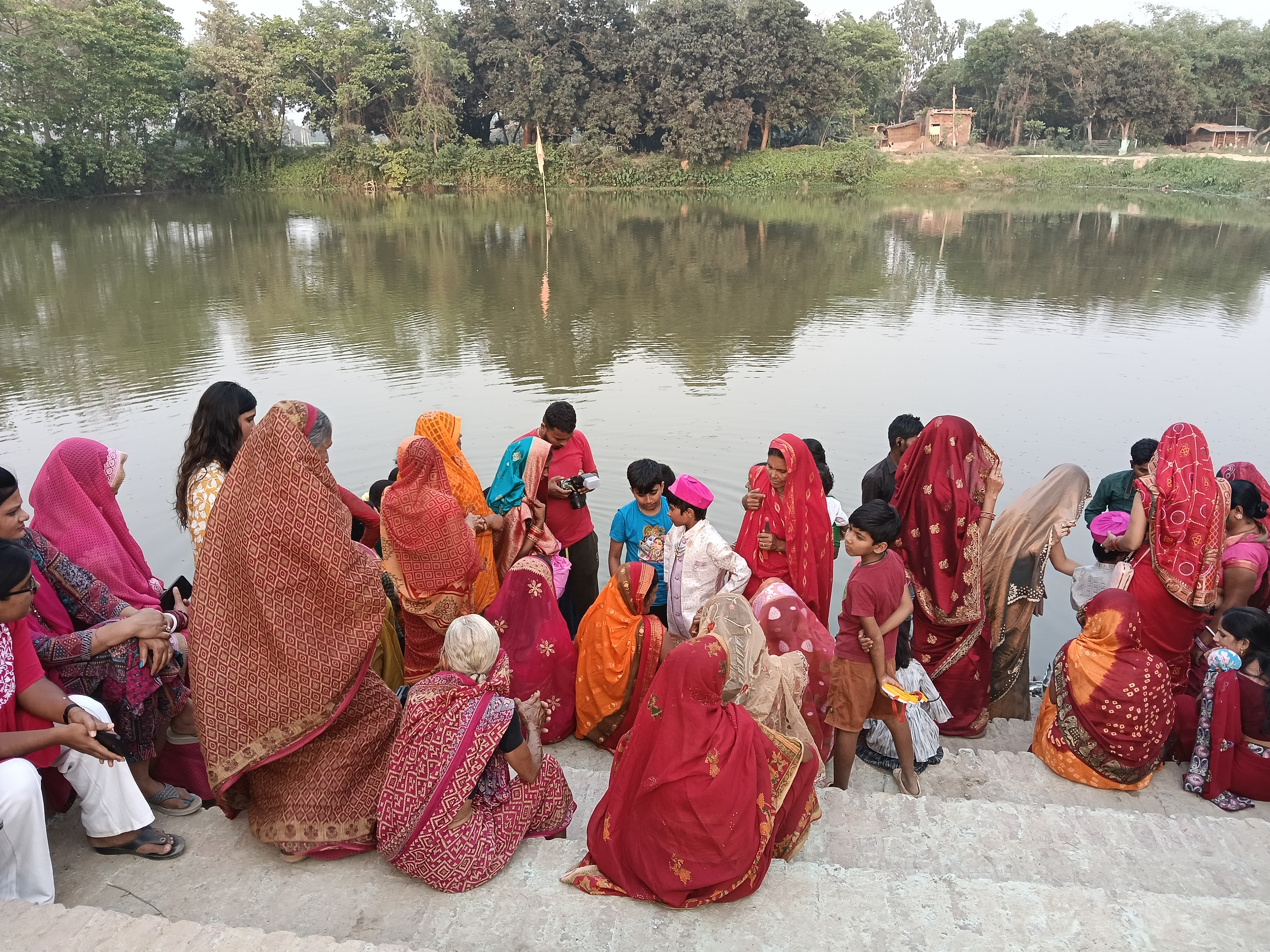
View during a Matkor ceremony conducted at Chaudhary Pokhair in the Basuki Bihari village

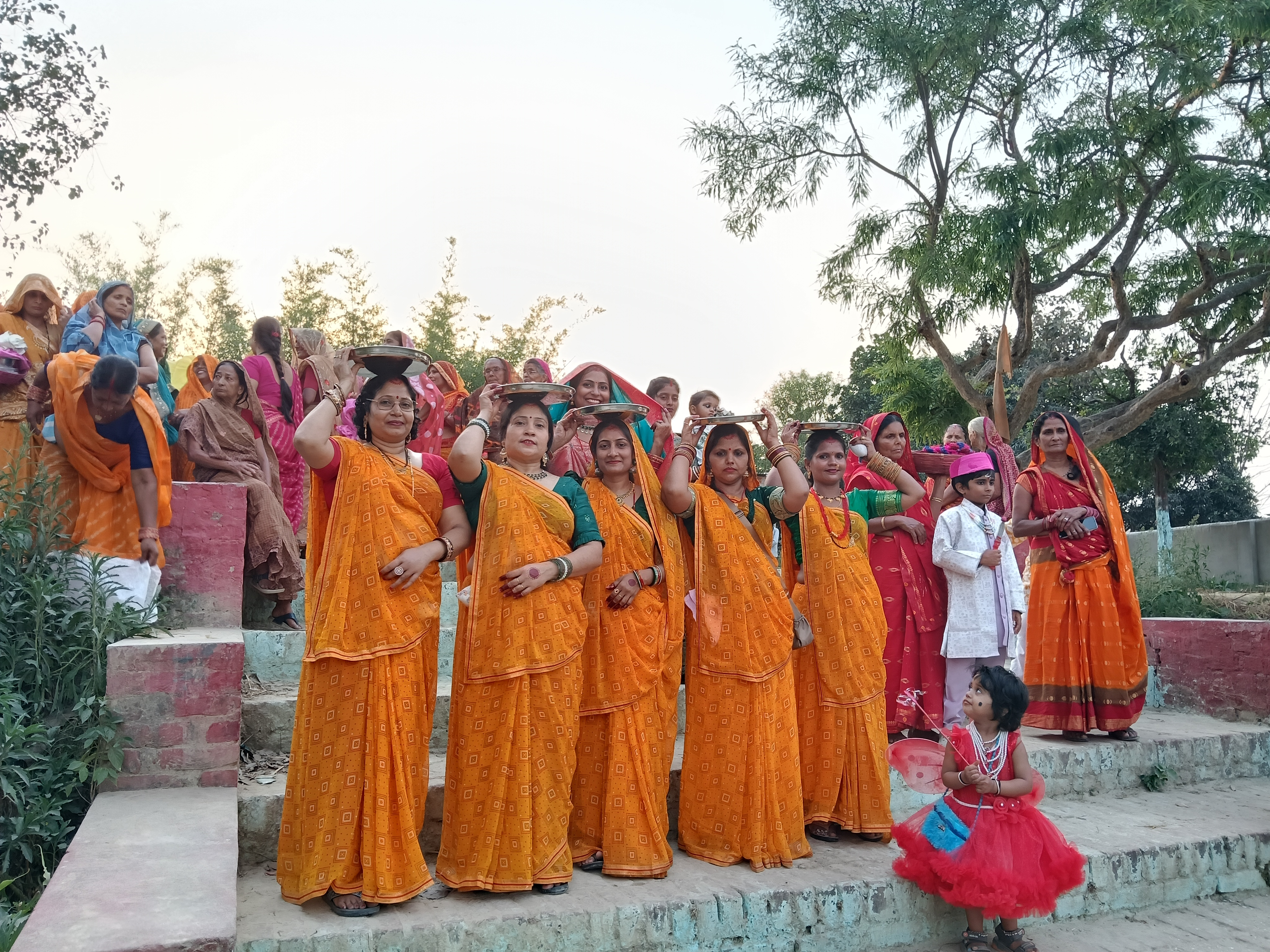
View during the Matkor ceremony

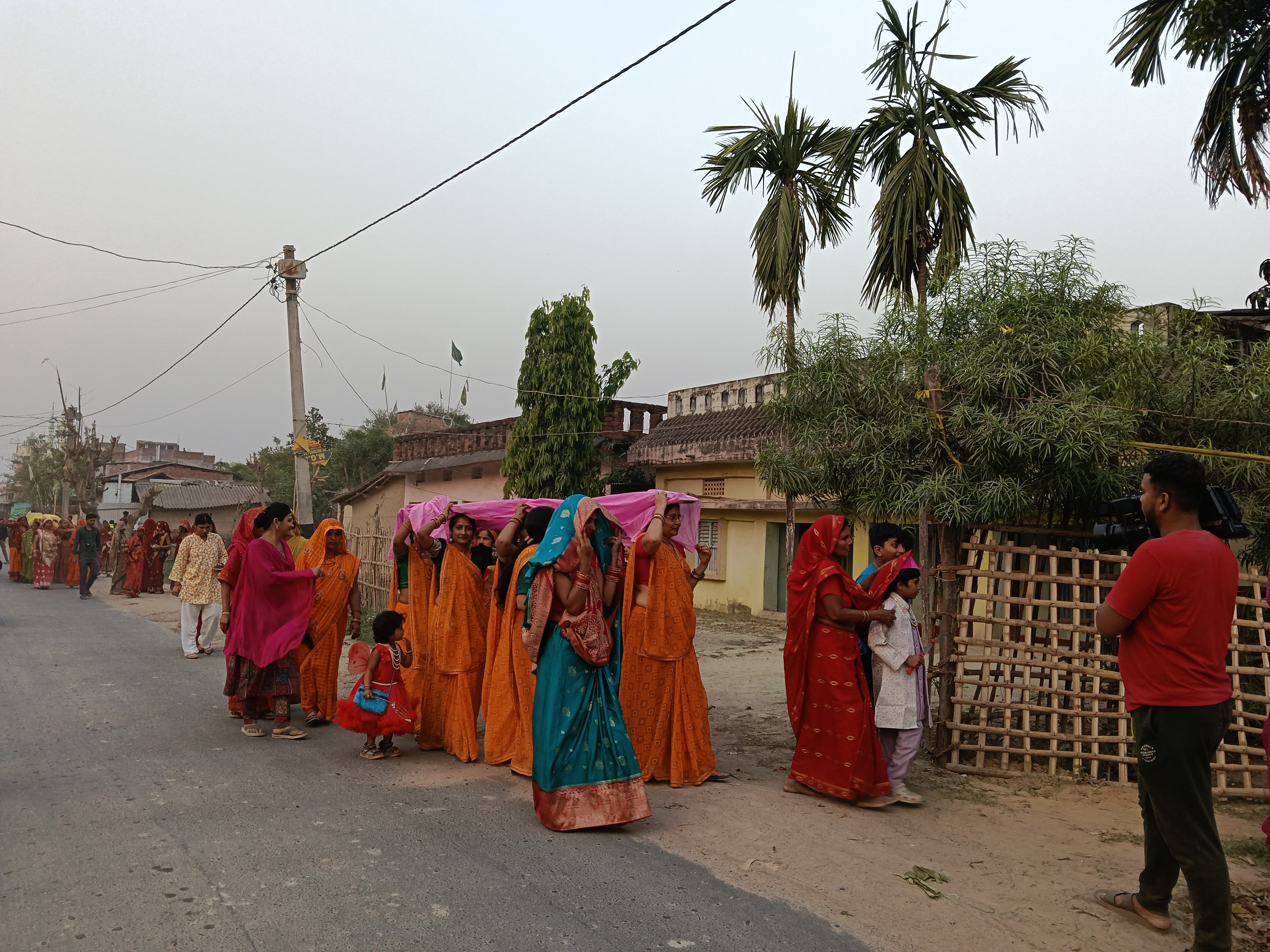
Procession of Matkor ritual

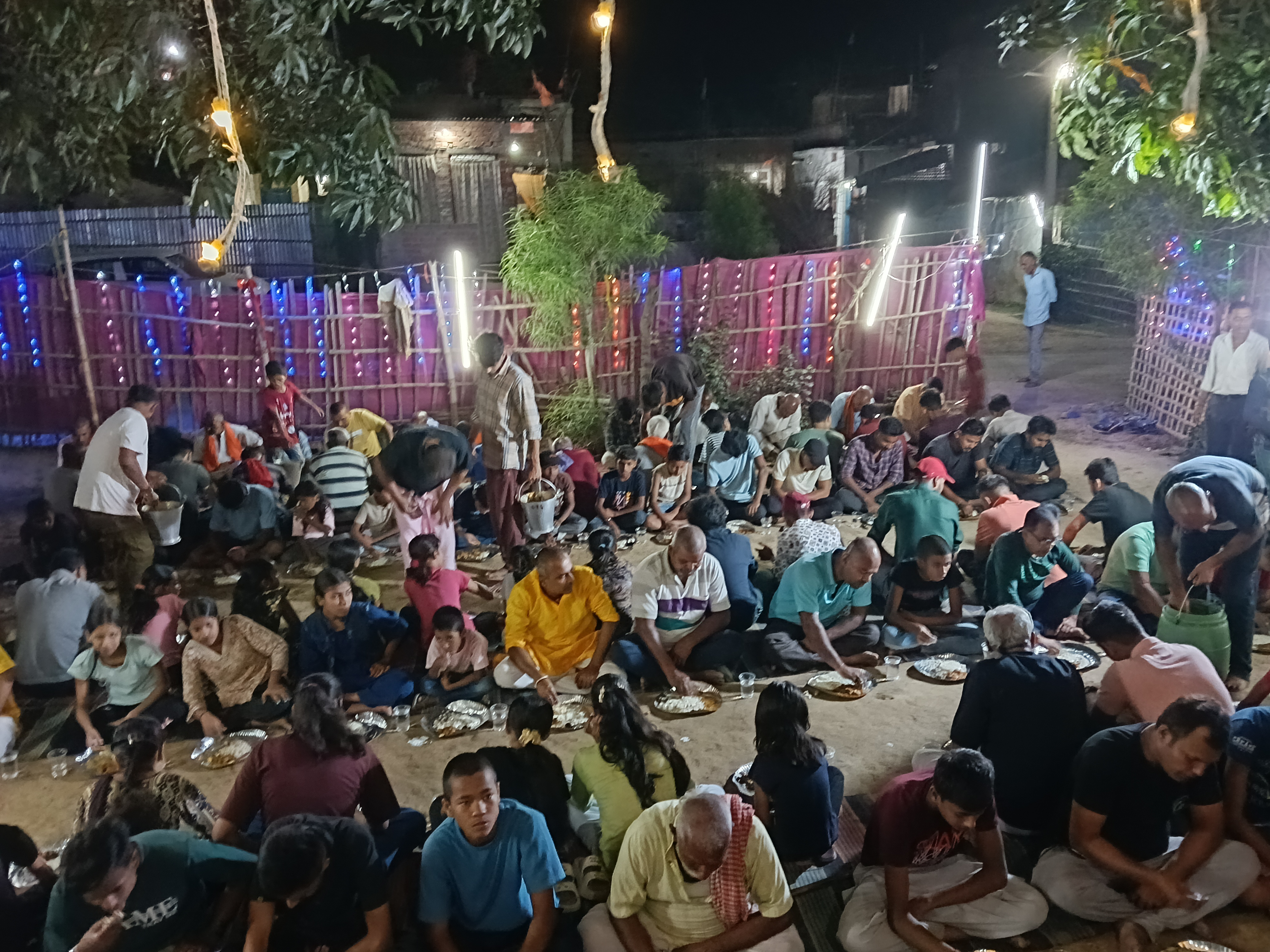
View of Brahmins bhoj on the occasion of Upanayana sanskar.

== See also ==
- Gosaunik Geet
- Brahman Geet
- Chumavan
- Durwakshat Mantra
- Chhandog
- Vajasaneyi Brahmin
- Janeu (sacred thread)
