= Mithila Makhana =

Special food of Mithila

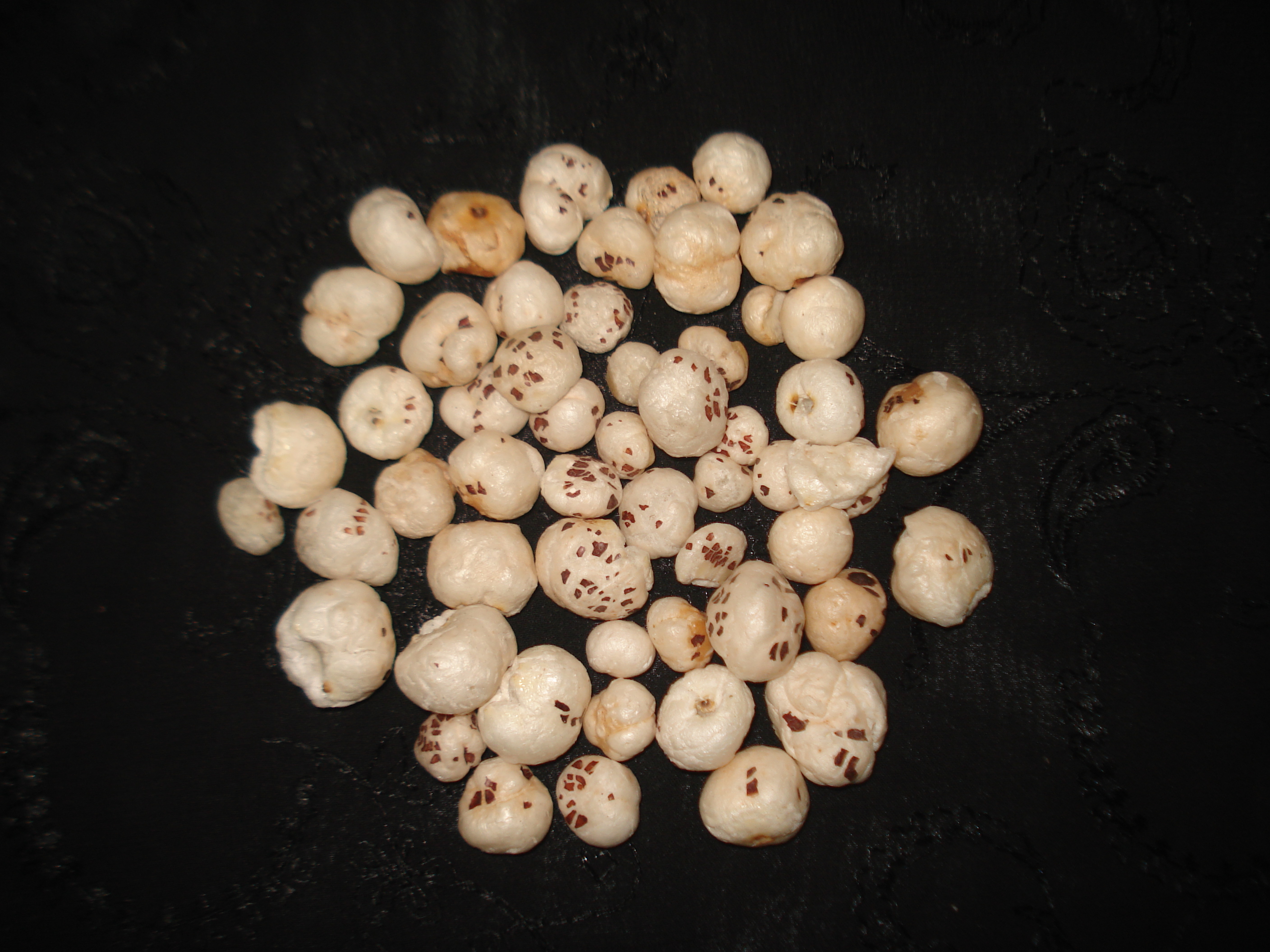
Mithila Makhana

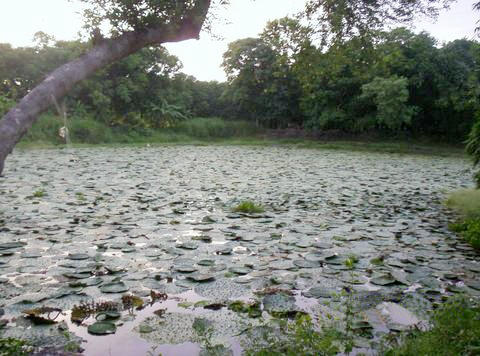
Pond in Mithila region cultivating Makhana

Mithila Makhana (botanical name: Euryale ferox) is a special variety of aquatic fox nut cultivated in Mithila region of Bihar state in India and in Nepal.

In Mithila, Makhana is also termed as Makhan. It is one of the three prestigious cultural identities of Mithila: Pond, Fish and Makhan (Maithili: पग-पग पोखरि, माछ, मखान). It is also used in the Kojagara festival celebrated for newly married couples among the Maithil Brahmins and Kaysaths.

A delicious drink item called Sakrauri served at Maithil Brahmin Bhoj in the Basuki Bihari village.

== Geographical indication tag ==
Bihar Agricultural University, Sabour facilitated in getting a geographical indication (GI) tag for Mithila Makhana, which it received in April 2022. Darbhanga MP Gopal Jee Thakur had led these efforts by demanding a GI tag for Mithila Makhana many times in the Parliament of India.

GI has been registered in the name of Mithilanchal Makhana Utpadak Sangh, Purnia. The Postal Department of India started a courier service for delivering Mithila Makhana in Bihar from 28 January 2021.

== Globalization ==
In the recent years Mithila Makhana has got popularity as a superfood in the global market. Indian prime minister Narendra Modi called makhana as a superfood while addressing a rally in Bhagalpur on 24 February 2025. Its demand is rapidly increasing in the markets of the western world. The US has become the largest consumer as well as the largest importer of the makhana. Similarly Canada and Australia are the next two big importers of Makhana after USA. According to media reports, it has also been termed as "The Black Diamond". India is the largest exporter of Makhana in the world. Similarly the Mithila region is the largest producer of Makhana in India. The Mithila region covers 80 percent of the total cultivation of Makhana in India. The prime minister Narendra Modi on 24 February 2025 announced that Makhana should be reached the market around the world.

== Government initiatives ==
In February 2025, the union finance minister Nirmala Sitharaman announced, during the speech of 2025 budget, to set up Makhana Board in Bihar. The major aims of the Makhana Board would be to enhance production, processing, value addition, and marketing of the makhana cultivated in the Mithila region of Bihar in India. On 23 February 2025, the union agriculture minister Shivraj Singh Chauhan arrived at the campus of Makhana Research Centre in Darbhanga to address and discuss about the formation of the proposed Makhana Board with the farmers involved in the cultivation of the Mithila Makhana in the region. On 24 February 2025, the prime minister Narendra Modi also repeated the formation of the proposed Makhana Board, while addressing a rally in Bhagalpur.

== See also ==
- Darbhanga
- Madhubani, India
- Madhubani art
