= Chumavan =

Folklore ritual in Mithila

चुमावन
- Chumaan
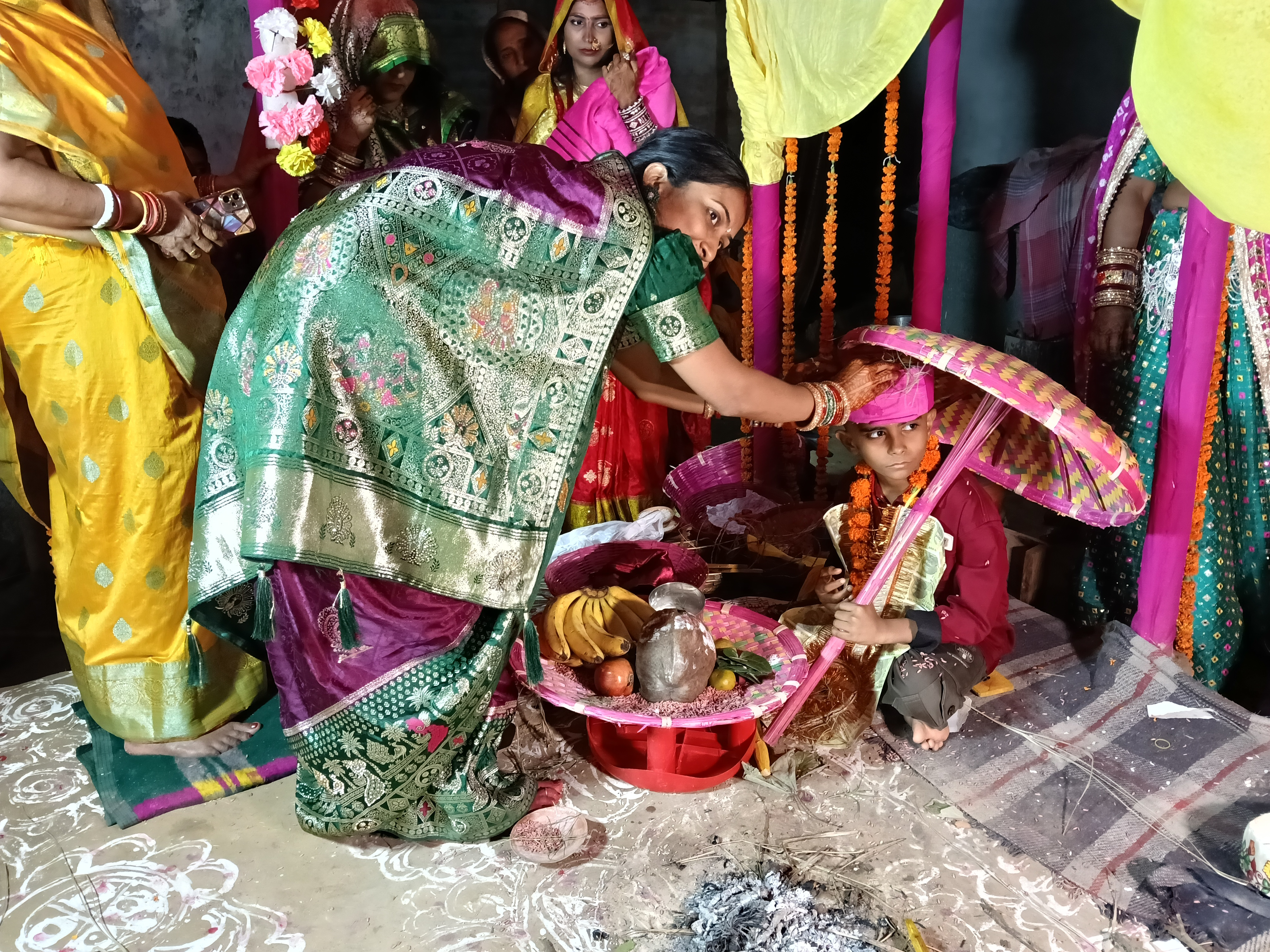
- Conducting chumavan ritual at a Maithil Upanayan ceremony in the Mithila region

Classification
- Sanskar ritual

Sanskar
- Region: Mithila region and Bhojpuri region
- Occasions: Bhojpuri Vivah, Maithil Vivah, Upanayan, Kojagra, Mundan, etc
- Rituals and Blessings: Chumavan Geet, Durwakshat Mantra
- Materials for ritual: Coloured rice grains with turmeric, durva grass, and curd

Chumavan or Chumaon (Maithili: चुमाओन) (Bhojpuri: चुमावन) is an auspicious ritual performed during weddings, sacred thread ceremonies, Kojagra and other auspicious ceremonies in the Bhojpur and Mithila regions of Indian subcontinent. It involves anointing with rice grains coloured with turmeric, durva grass, and curd. During the ritual process, women sing folk songs in the regional languages of Maithili and Bhojpuri. These folk songs are known as Chumavan Geet,. In the Mithila region, the elders of the family give blessings by chanting Durwakshat Mantra. It is based on folklore in the region.

== Description ==
In the Mithila region as well as Bhojpuri speaking areas of the Indian subcontinent, the Chumavan is an auspicious ritual practiced during some auspicious occasions in the families. It is generally observed on the occasion of Upanayan, mundan, marriage, Maithil Vivah, and Kojagra, etc.

During the wedding ceremony, it is performed for the physical examination of the bride and groom. During the Chumavan ritual, the women attending the ceremony examine the body parts of the bride and groom by touching them secretly. In the ritual, the women sing Chumavan Geet and one by one they touch five parts of the body with akshat (rice grains) and finally impart blessings to the wedding couple. The Chumavan Geet are blessings songs sung for the couple.

In the Bhojpuri region, Chumawan is performed by married women, usually close relatives of the bride or bridegroom. During the ceremony, they hold uncooked rice in their hands, touch the bride's or bridegroom's hands, knees, and shoulders, and then throw the rice behind them. The ritual is repeated three, five, or seven times while traditional Bhojpuri Chumawan Geet are sung. It symbolizes fertility, prosperity, and auspiciousness, and is performed to invoke blessings for the couple's health, protection, abundance, and a prosperous married life, while also expressing the family's affection and goodwill.

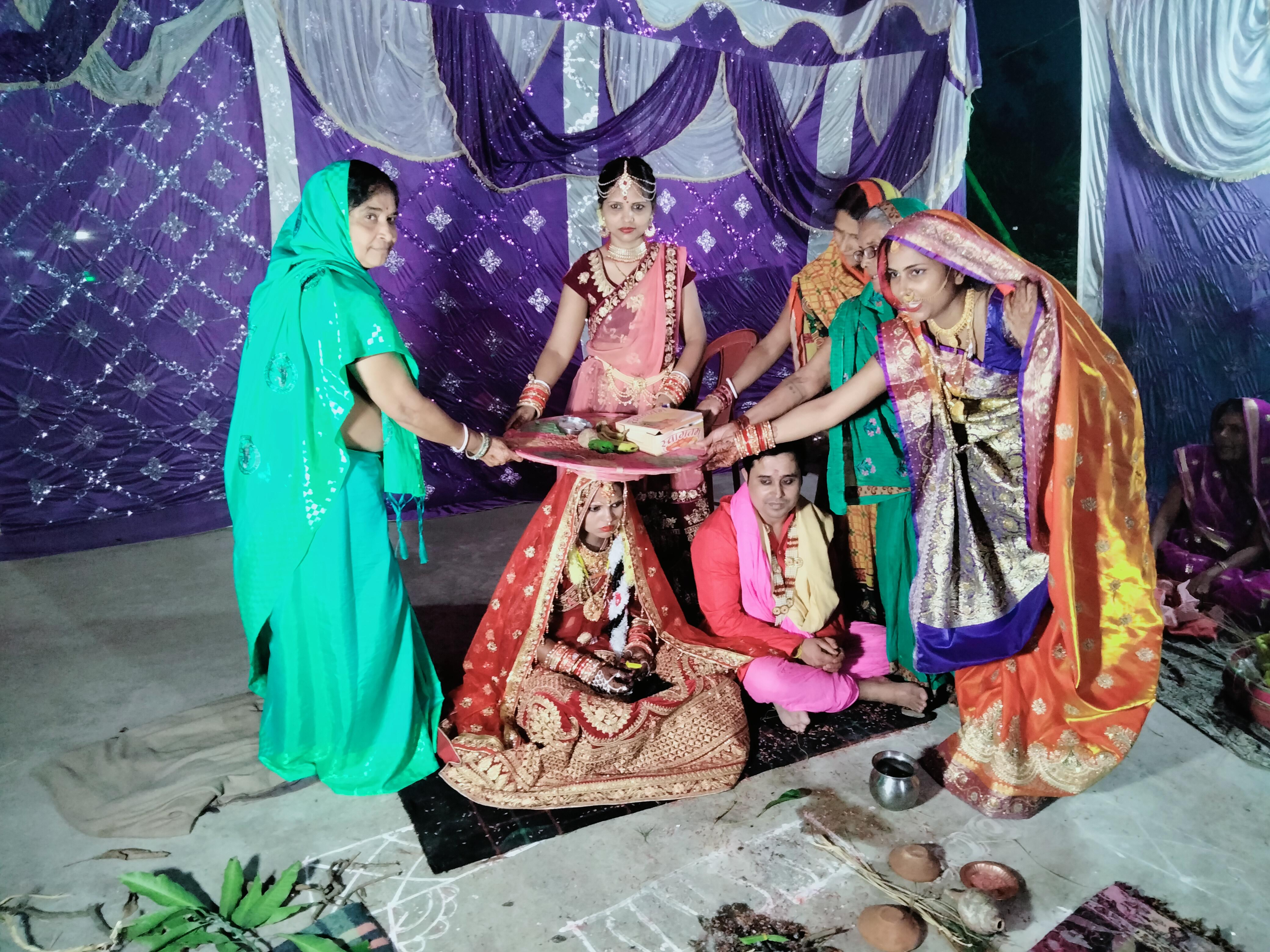
View of the Chumavan ritual in a Maithil Vivah.

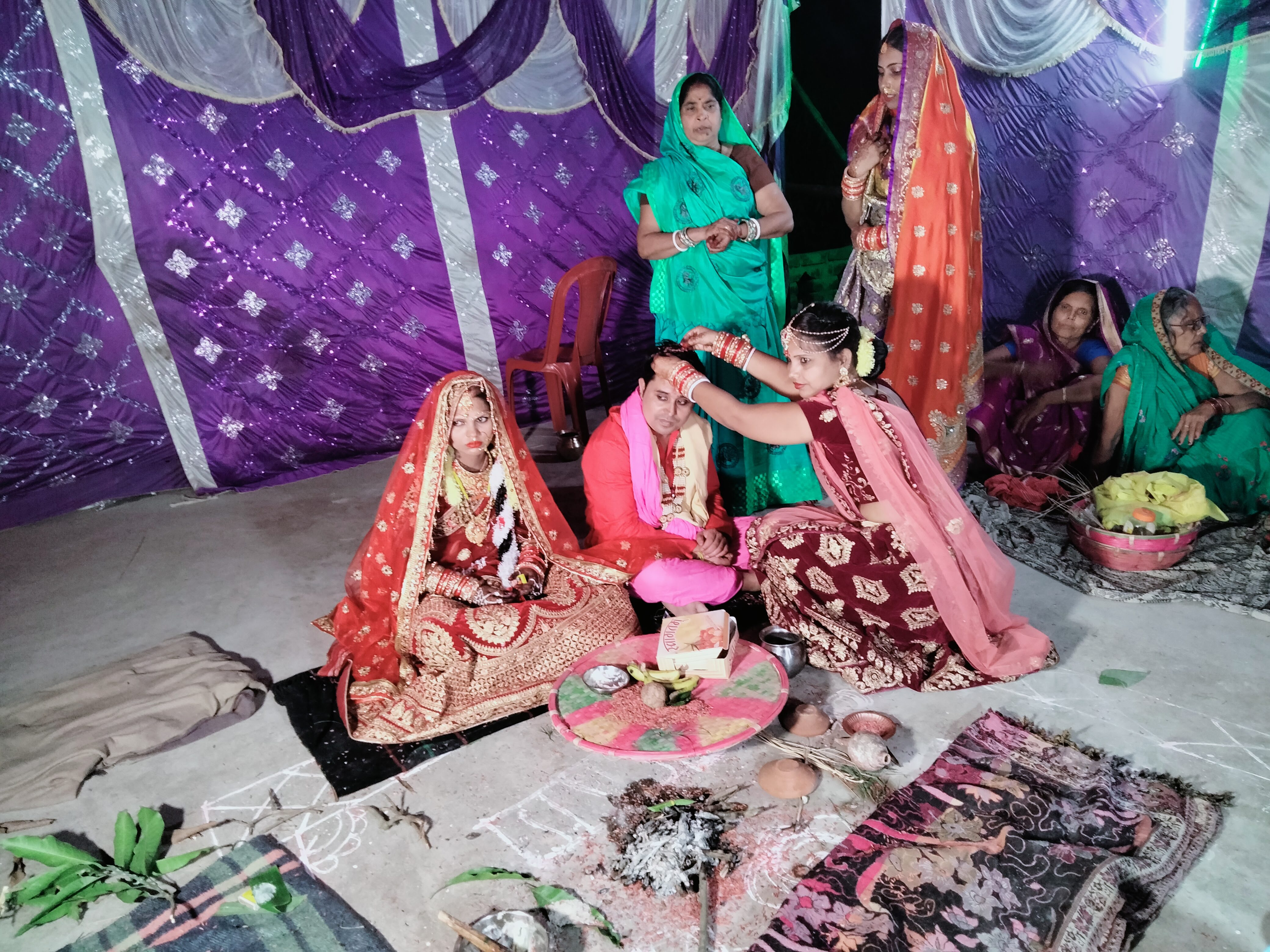
Performance of the Chumavan ritual to the groom one by one.

In the Mithila region, the items or money that the invited person gives to his relatives to fulfill the invitation during the auspicious occasions is also called Chumavan.

A Bhojpuri Chumavan ceremony song
