= Kojagra =

Festival in Mithila

- Also called: कोजगरा
- Observed by: Maithil Brahmin, Maithil Kayasthas
- Type: Ethnic
- Date: Sharad Purnima
- Frequency: Annual
- First time: Treta Yuga
- Started by: King Siradhwaja Janaka for Lord Rama

Kojagra (Maithili: कोजगरा) is a special festival of the Mithila region in the Indian subcontinent. It is a sanskar ritual for the newly married couples among the communities of the Maithil Brahmins and Kayasthas. It is celebrated on the occasion of Sharad Purnima in the Hindu month of Ashvin.

== Etymology ==
The word Kojagara is primarily associated with the Nakshatra Pati (King of constellation) Moon. The indic term Jagra is considered the moon's rays, derived from the words "jagaran" and "ku" which becomes "ko" related to the nectar-like rays of moonlight. This means that the full moon is celebrated as the day of awakening in its nectar-like rays. Similarly, according to another theory, the word Kojagra is derived from the Sanskrit phrase "Ko Jagarti?". The Sanskrit phrase translates to "Who is awakened?". The meaning of the phrase gives special symbolism to the festival.

== Description ==
Kojagra is a sanskar ritual associated with the tradition of the Maithil Vivah among the communities of Maithil Brahmins and Maithil Kayasthas. It is a Lokaparva of the Mithila region. In the Mithila region, the marriage is not just a relationship between two individuals, but also a ritual that connects two families mutually. In the festival of Kojagra, a Bhaar of fruits, sweets, Khaajaa, Makhana, Batasha and Paan, etc is sent from the house of newly married brides to the house of newly married grooms. The rituals of the festival are performed at night. In the evening, the groom dressed up in the clothes brought from his in-laws' house, then the women of his house and society perform Chumavan ritual with him. Similarly, at least five the elder men of his family or society impart blessings by chanting Durwaksht Mantra. After the Chumavan ritual, the groom plays a game of Pachchisi with his brother-in-law. For this, cowries and dice come from the family of bride house only. The loser gives a gift to the winner. During this game, a gathering of Maithili folk songs and music is also performed by the women. After the completion of the rituals procedure of the Kojagara festival, there is a tradition of distributing Makhana, Batasha and Paan (betel leaves) among the people of the society in the night. The festival of Kojagra is treated as the symbol of social harmony in the region. On the occasion of Kojagra, a sacred feast for Brahmins Bhoj is also organised by the family of groom in the night.

=== Importance of Makhana ===
Makhana has special importance in the festival of Kojagra. On this day, makhana porridge, which is full of nutritional properties, is prepared and kept in the moonlight overnight, giving it immortality, and then it is fed to the newly married man so that he remains free from all diseases and lives a long life.

== Legend ==
The main deity of the Kojagra festival is Goddess Lakshmi. In the festival, Annapurna form of the Goddess is worshipped. According to legend, the Goddess Annapurna starts residing in the house from the night of Kojagra festival of Ashvin month. It is said that worshipping the Annapurna form of the Goddess sincerely in the night of Kojagra, there is happiness, prosperity and peace in the house and food crisis never comes in the house. With this belief, the Goddess Annapurna is worshipped in every house of the Maithil people in that night.

The tradition of celebrating Kojagra has been going on from ancient times in the folk culture of Mithila. It was originated from the court of King Janaka in Mithila. According to legend, it was started by the King Janaka in Treta Yuga for his son-in-law Lord Rama. The first Kojagara was performed by the King Janaka for Lord Rama. It is said that the King Janaka performed the Kojagara puja for his son-in-law Rama and daughter Sita and sent betel (paan) leaves, bananas, makhana, and laddus as gifts for Rama. Since then, this festival of Kojagra has been celebrated in the Mithila region.

The festival Kojagra is also related to the Samundra Manthan story of Puranas. In the Samundra Manthan (churning of the ocean) story as described in various Puranas written by Vedas Vyasa, Goddess Lakshmi emerged on the full moon day of Ashwin Shukla Paksha. There is a classical belief that this date should be specifically celebrated as the day for worshipping Goddess Lakshmi. According to Puranas, Lord Chandradeva and Goddess Lakshmi originated from the ocean, both are considered to be siblings. In the festival, Lord Chandradeva is also very important and worshipped. As evident from the Vedas and Ayurveda shows that the medicinal properties of all the trees and plants on earth are transmitted to them only through the moon rays. Similarly in the text Bhagawad Geeta, Lord Krishna, while preaching to Arjuna, said, "Nakshatranamah Shashi," meaning, "I am the moon, chief among all the stars."

During this festival, which occurs after the end of the rainy season, the sky is completely clear and its rays, full of medicinal properties, fall directly on the earth. Based on these beliefs, Kojagara festival is celebrated with special importance on this date in Mithila.

== See also ==
- Kojagari Lakshmi Puja
