= Brahman Geet =

Maithili folk songs for Brahman Babu

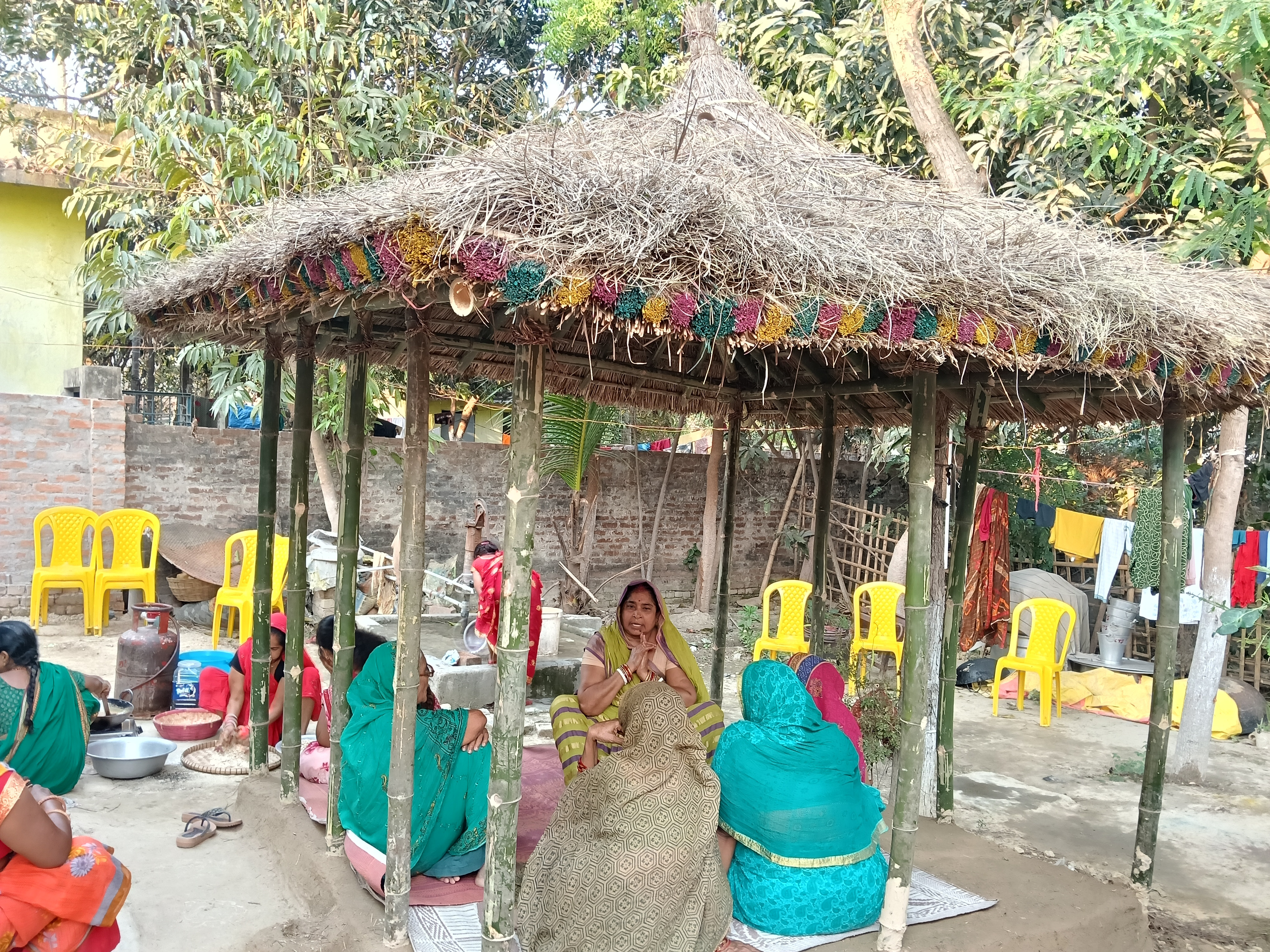
- Maithil Brahmin women singing Brahman Geet at a Maithil Upanayan Mandap in the Mithila region.

Song by Maithil Brahmin women
- Language: Maithili
- Venue: Brahma Sthan and courtyard of Maithil Brahmins,
- Genre: Maithili folk songs

Brahman Geet (Maithili: ब्राह्मण गीत) also known as Brahman Babu Geet are Maithili folk songs sung during the sacred ceremonies of Maithil upanayana and Maithil Vivah, etc. in the Mithila region of the Indian subcontinent. These are sanskar ceremonial songs among the Maithil community in the region. The songs of the Brahman Geet are dedicated to the Gram Devta Brahma Baba also known as Dihavar Baba.

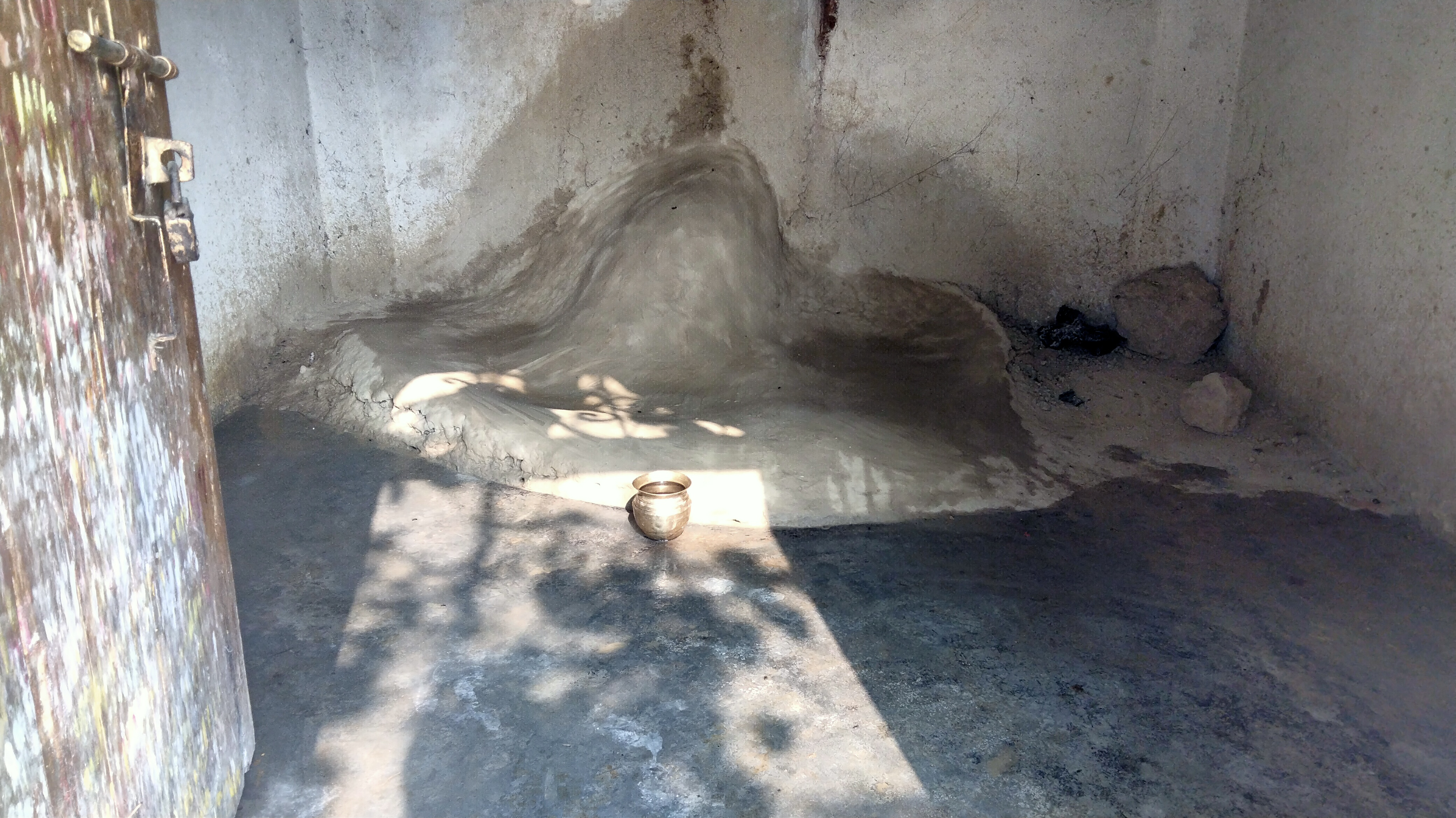
Iconic seat of Brahma Baba or Baraham Baba at Brahma Sthan in Basuki Bihari village of the Mithila region

== Etymology ==
According to the Indian philosophy, Brahman refers to the ultimate reality. In the tradition of Maithil culture, the folk deity Gram Devta ( God of village) is also called as Brahman. The term Brahman refers to the personification of the Gram Devta. The other Indic term Geet means song. Thus, the literal meaning of Brahman Geet is songs dedicated to the Brahman or the Gram Devta.

== Description ==
"Brahman Babu yao hamro par hoiyao na sahay" is a popular Brahman Geet sung at different ceremonies in the region, which deeply mesmerize (Mantramugdh) the Maithil audiences at the ceremonies. There are several Maithili folk songs in the collection of Brahman Geet. These are often sung by the women of the Maithil Brahmins community in the region. Apart from the community of Maithil Brahmins, the communities of Mallaah, Musahar, and Domin, etc have their own versions of the Brahman Geet. In the popular folk dance Jhijhiya performed by ladies of Musahar community, a Brahman Geet dedicated to Baraham Baba is also sung by them.

तोहरे भरोसे बरहम बाबा झिझिया बनेलियै हो, बरहम बाबा झिझिया पर होइयौ ने सवार

— Brahman Geet, Jhijhiya folk dance

The folk songs of the Brahman Geet are an important part of the folklore in the Maithili literature of the Mithila region in the Indian subcontinent.
