= Brahma Sthan =

Deity of Village in Mithila region

Brahma Baba
- Protector of Village
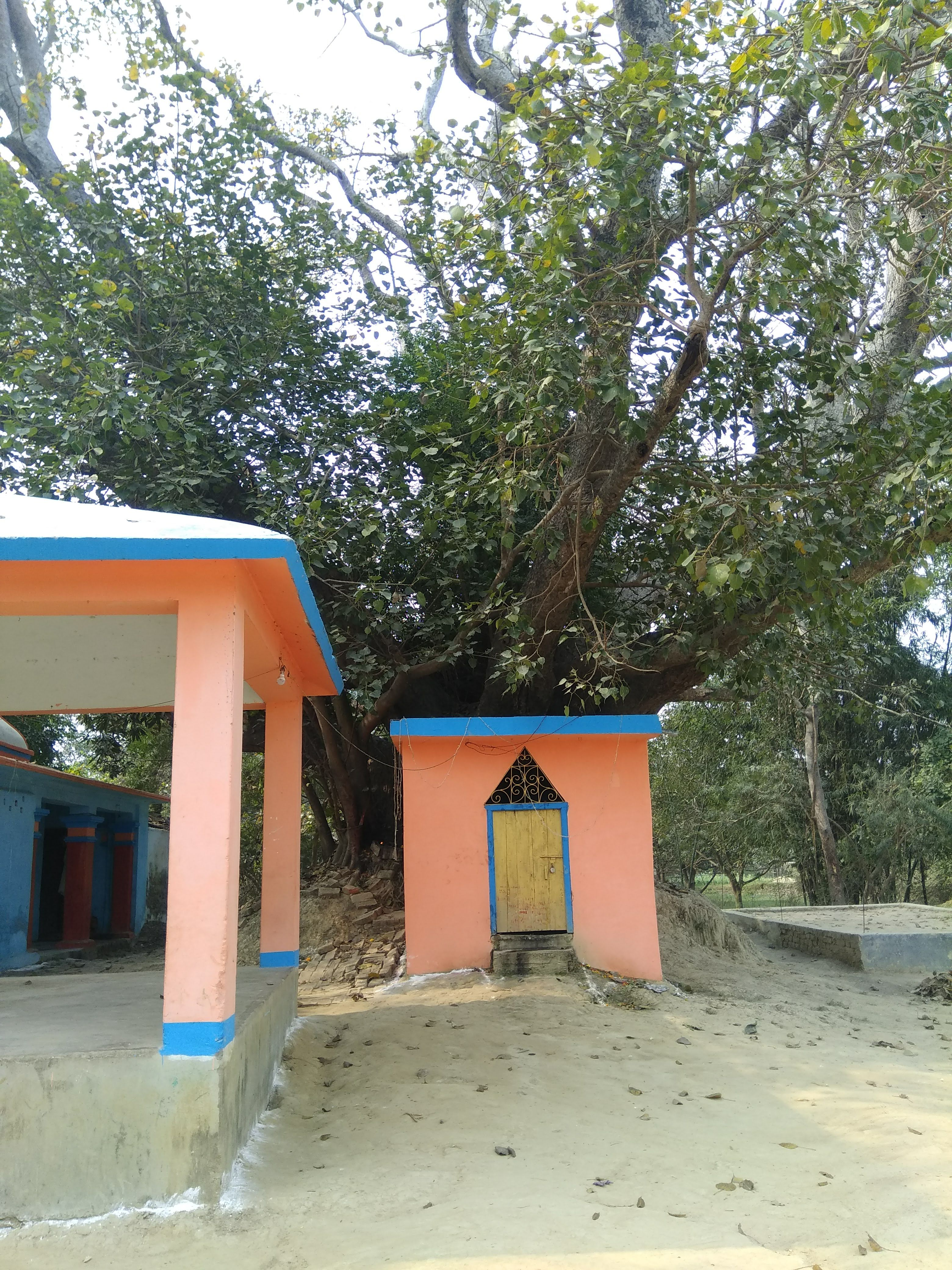
- Brahma Baba Sthan at Basuki Bihari North village
- Other names: Gram Devata; Dihavar Baba; Baraham Baba
- Venerated in: Brahman Geet, folklore and legendary tales
- Affiliation: Hinduism
- Abode: Peepal Tree
- Mantra: Vedic
- Symbol: Protection of village.
- Adherents: Hindus
- Tree: Peepal or Banayan
- Region: Mithila region and Bhojpuri region
- Temple: Brahma Baba Sthan
- Festivals: Paatair Puja, Annual Brahma Baba Utsav

Genealogy
- Avatar birth: Vishnu

Brahma Sthan (ब्रह्म स्थान or बरहम स्थान ) are religious places in villages of the Mithila region for worshiping the folk deity Brahm Baba or Baraham Baba in Bihar and Nepal. In the Mithila region and some other adjoining areas in Bihar, Brahm Baba is considered the protector god for the villages. Brahm Baba is also known as Gram Devta or Dihawar Baba.

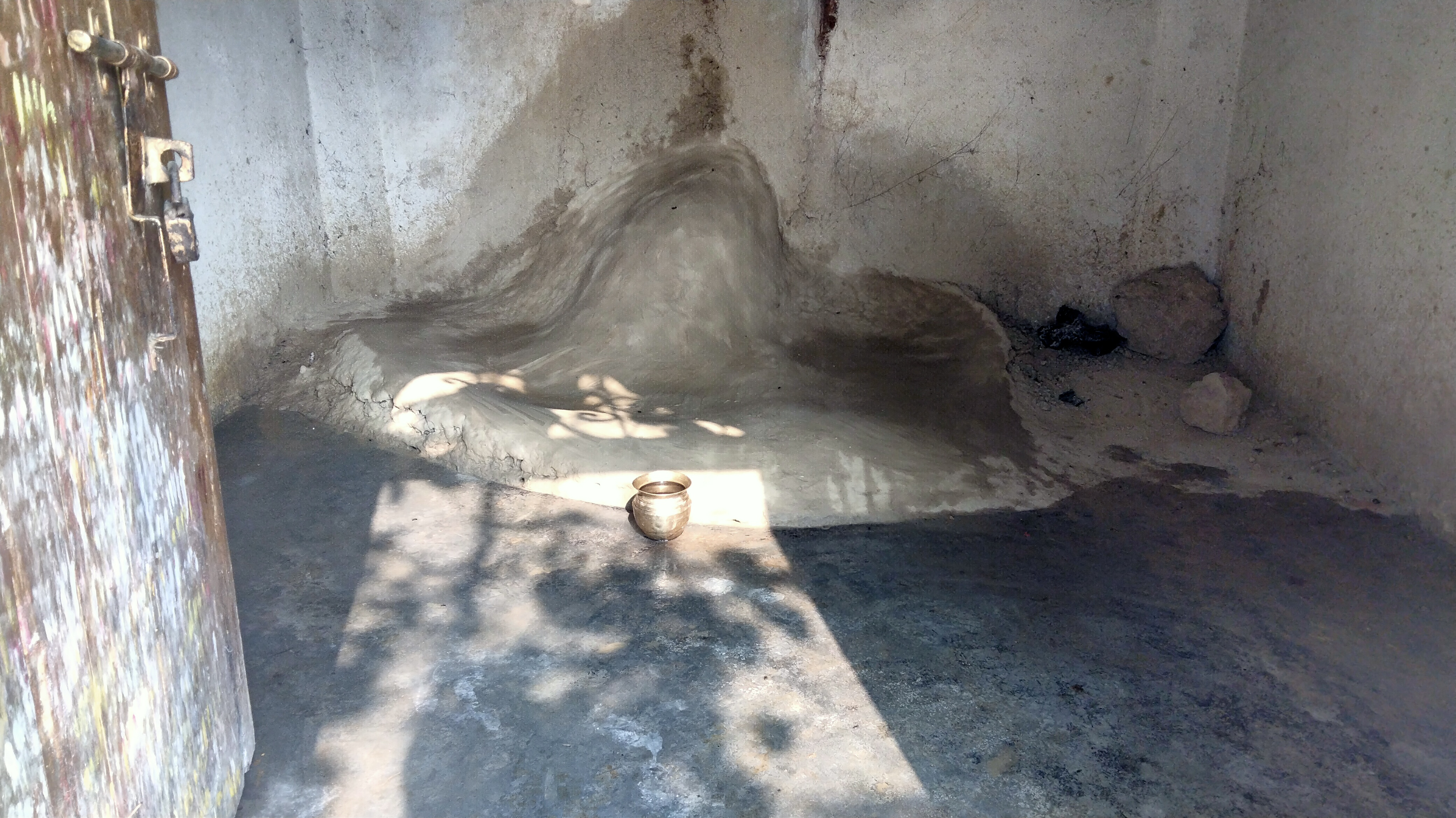
The iconic seat of Brahma Baba at the Brahma Sthan Mandir in the campus of the Basuki Nath Mahadev Mandir. It is symbolic representation of Brahma Baba in the Mithila region.

== Legendary description ==
According to rule, a Brahma Sthan should be in the west outside of a village in the form of a Peepal tree or Banyan tree, but when the village expands, more than one Brahma Sthan is formed in different directions of the village.

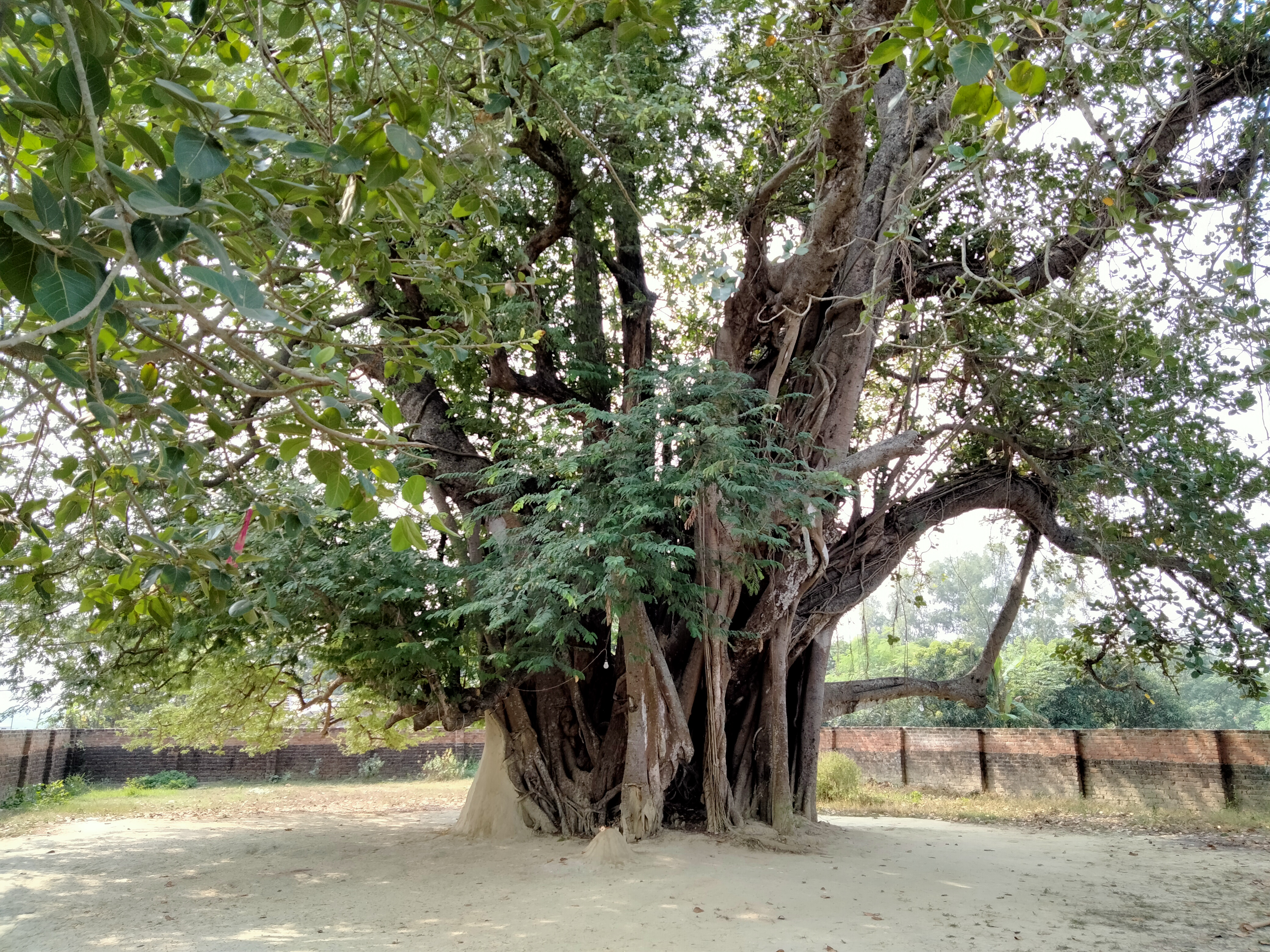
Brahm Baba Sthan, Banauli Vidyapati Dih

=== Rituals ===
People offer earthen pot, dhoti, Hindu sacred thread Jenau, sweets, petals leaf, flowers etc. to the Brahma Baba. People on occasions of marriages and other auspicious occasions in the house, the first salutations are done at the Brahm Sthan. The concept of Brahma Baba is legendary, folklore and tribal. During the festival of Durga Puja in the Mithila region, a local folk dance as well as song called as Jhijhiya is performed by the Musahar community , in which Brahma Baba is also remembered.

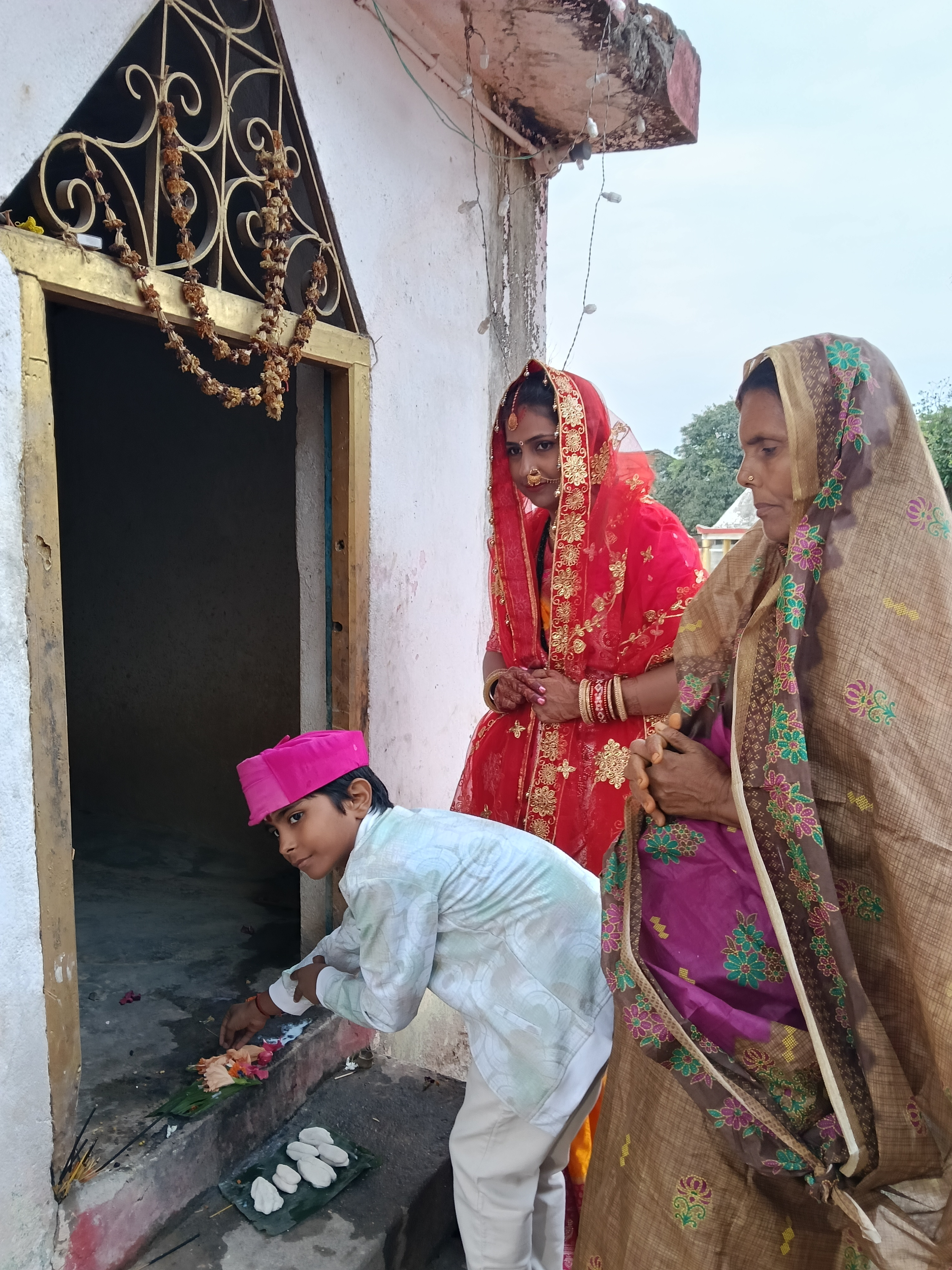
View of the salutations to Brahma Baba during a Maithil Upanayan ceremony at Basuki Bihari. The baruaa of the Maithil Upanayan is performing Puja to Bramha Baba.

=== Legend ===
According to legend, Brahma Baba is considered as the form of Vishnu, who belongs to the entire society or villagers. In this regard, there is a legend related to the foundation of a village in the region. According to Pandit Giridhar Jha, when the foundation of a village is laid in the Mithila region, the protector deity Vishnu is invoked at that time. According to him, the protector deity Vishnu is called as Brahma Baba in the common language of the region.

== Festivals ==
In the region of Mithila, an annual festival dedicated to Brahma Baba is also celebrated by villagers at the temples of Brahma Sthan in their villages. Similarly, a festival known as Paatair Puja dedicated to Brahma Baba is celebrated with great pomp and show in the villages of the region.
