= Kharaam =

Traditional Indian wooden sandal

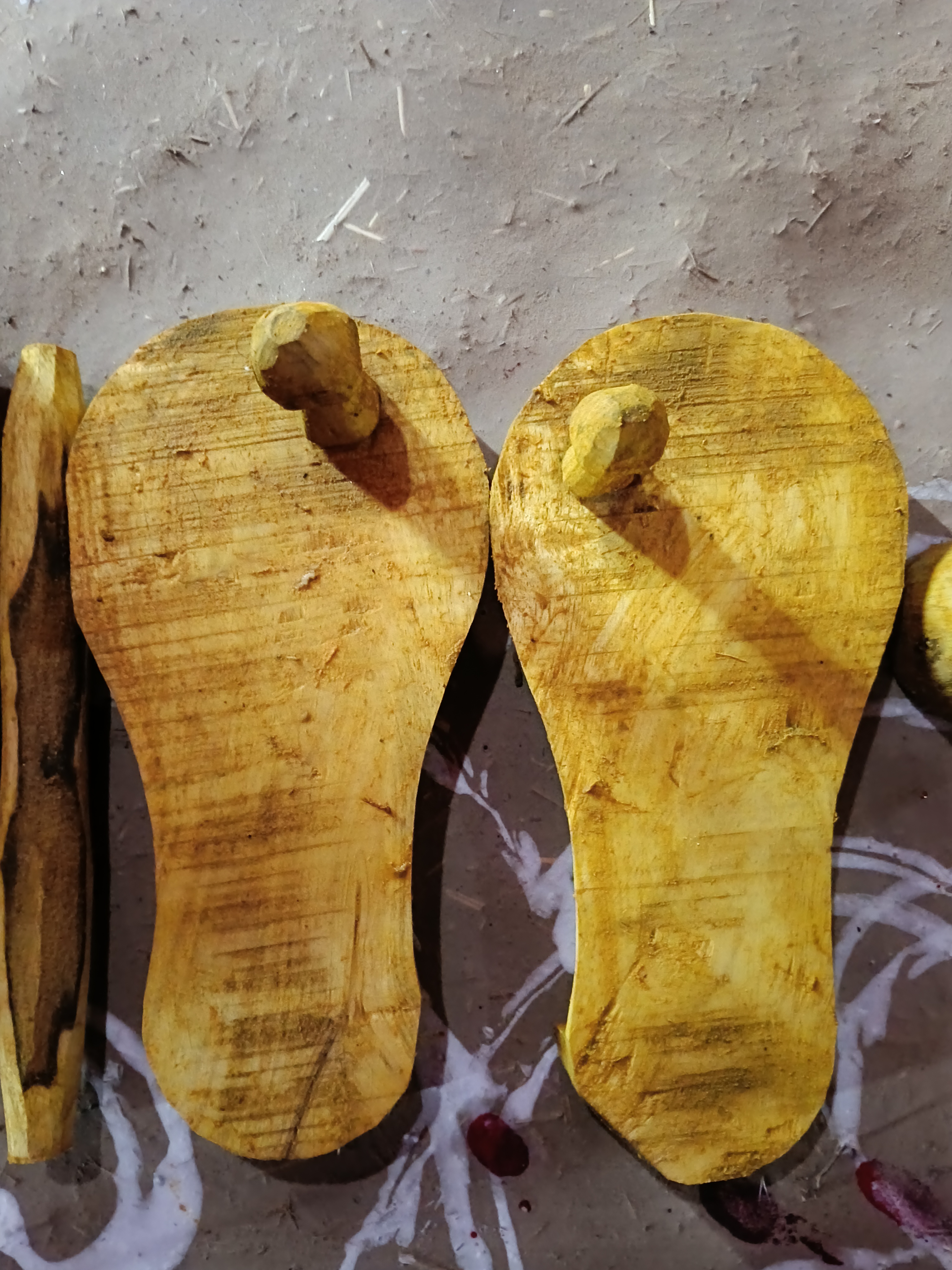
A pair of Kharaam used in Maithil Upanayan at the Laxman Garden in Basuki Bihari village of Mithila.

Kharaam (Maithili: खराम) in the Mithila region of Indian subcontinent refers to a pair of traditional wooden sandal often used by Brahmins and scholars. It was often used in the early period of the subcontinent. Nowadays it has only religious significance in Hinduism but not used in general daily life. During the rituals of the Maithil Upanayan in the region, it is used by the baruaa or batuka. In the other parts of the subcontinent, it has several other names like charan paduka, and khadau, etc. In the epic Ramayana, the Kharaam used by Lord Rama was worshipped by his brother Bharata.

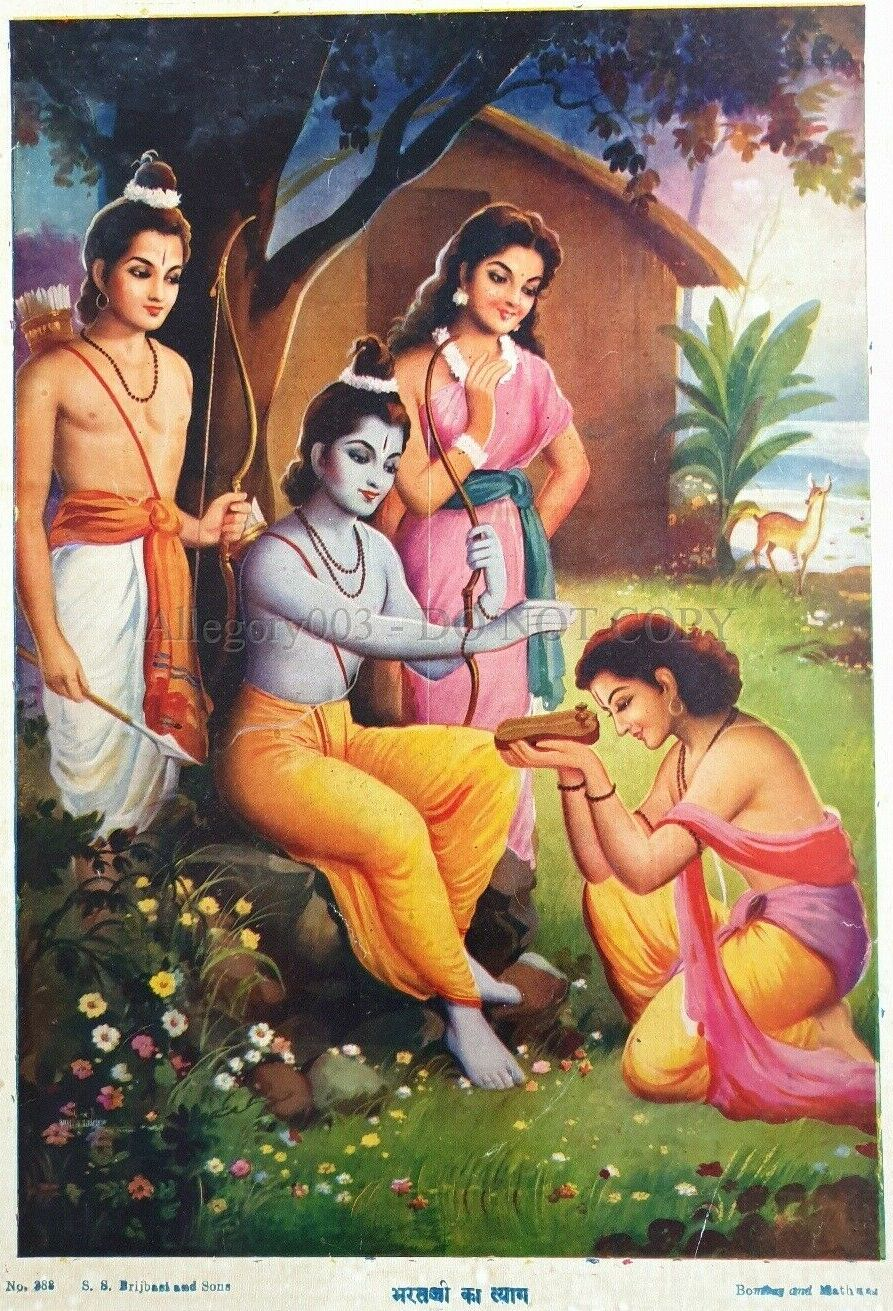
In the epic Ramayana, Bharata took the Kharaam used by Lord Rama at Chitrakoot.

== Description ==
In the early period of the subcontinent, it was used by Sadhu, saints, Rishi and Muni, etc. In Hinduism, it is considered as a sacred item. It is mentioned in the text Yajurveda as a wooden sandal.

The kharaam is an ancient form of wooden footwear among the Maithil community. It is made by the woods of gamhair gachhi. In the early times, it was customary to wear kharaam in the feet until recently. The tradition of giving a pair of kharaam by Maithils community to their guests for washing the feet is still common in many places in the region. In the upper classes community, wearing kharaam starts with the Upanayan Sanskar.
