= Durwakshat Mantra =

Blessing Mantra chanted in Mithila

Durwakshta Mantra
- दूर्वाक्षत मंत्र

Information
- Religion: Hinduism
- Author: Yajnavalkya
- Language: Sanskrit
- Chanted by minimum five elder male Brahmins
- Mantra in Shukla Yajurveda
- Blessing Mantra chanted in Mithila region

Durwakshat Mantra (Sanskrit: दूर्वाक्षत मंत्र) is a blessing mantra chanted in the Mithila region of the Indian Subcontinent.

== Etymology ==
Durwakshata is a compound Sanskrit word having two terms Dūrvā and Akshata. In the Mithila region, the Mantra is chanted by taking the sacred grass Dūrvā and Akshata in hand by Brahmins and at the end of the mantra, the sacred grass Dūrvā and Akshata is thrown on the blessee. Since the sacred grass Dūrvā and Akshata is used by the Brahmins as the material things for blessing in the Mantra, it is known as Durwakshata Mantra.

== Description ==
In the Mithila region of the Indian Subcontinent, the Durwakshata Mantra is chanted for the blessing in auspicious occasions by minimum five married elder male Brahmins. This mantra is generally chanted on the occasion of marriage, Kojagra, Upanayana and Mundan ceremonies, etc. It is chanted during the Chumavan ritual on these auspicious occasions. It is also known as the Vedic prayer for the nation. In Hindi, it is called "Vedic Rastriya Prarthana".

Devanagari

ॐ आ ब्रह्म॑न्ब्राह्म॒णो ब्र॑ह्मवर्च॒सी जा॑यता॒मा रा॒ष्ट्रे रा॑ज॒न्यः शूर॑ इष॒व्योऽतिव्या॒धी म॑हार॒थो जा॑यतां॒ दोग्ध्री॑ धे॒नुर्वोढा॑न॒ड्वाना॒शुः सप्ति॒: पुर॑न्धि॒र्योषा॑ जि॒ष्णू र॑थे॒ष्ठाः स॒भेयो॒ युवास्य यज॑मानस्य वी॒रो जा॑यतां॒ निका॒मे-नि॑कामे नः प॒र्जन्यो॑ वर्षतु॒ फल॑वत्यो न॒ ओष॑धयः पच्यन्तां योगक्षे॒मो न॑: कल्पताम् ।

IAST

oṃ ā brahma̍nbrāhma̱ṇo bra̍hmavarca̱sī jā̍yatā̱mā rā̱ṣṭre rā̍ja̱nyaḥ śūra̍ iṣa̱vyo'tivyā̱dhī ma̍hāra̱tho jā̍yatā̱ṃ dogdhrī̍ dhe̱nurvoḍhā̍na̱ḍvānā̱śuḥ sapti̱: pura̍ndhi̱ryoṣā̍ ji̱ṣṇū ra̍the̱ṣṭhāḥ sa̱bheyo̱ yuvāsya yaja̍mānasya vī̱ro jā̍yatā̱ṃ nikā̱me-ni̍kāme naḥ pa̱rjanyo̍ varṣatu̱ phala̍vatyo na̱ oṣa̍dhayaḥ pacyantāṃ yogakṣe̱mo na̍: kalpatām .

Translation by Ralph T.H. Griffith

O Brahman, let there be born in the kingdom the Brahman illustrious for religious knowledge; let there be born the Rājanya, heroic, skilled archer, piercing with shafts, mighty warrior; the cow giving abundant milk; the ox good at carrying; the swift courser; the industrious woman. May Parjanya send rain according to our desire; may our fruit-bearing plants ripen; may acquisition and
preservation of property be secured to us.

The Durwakshata Mantra is taken from the 22nd mantra of the 22nd chapter in the Madhyandina Samhita of the White Yajurveda. According to Maithil scholar Gajendra Thakur, the mantra was chanted for the devotion towards the Nation in entire Indian subcontinent by people in the early times.

But in the Mithila region, adding "मंत्रार्थाः सिद्धयः सन्तु पूर्णाः सन्तु मनोरथाः। शत्रुणां बुद्धिनाशोऽस्तु मित्राणामुदयस्तव।" after the mantra became the blessing Mantra in the tradition of Maithil Brahmins.

== Translations ==
The meaning of the first line of the Mantra can be translate in English as "O God! May a Brahmin teacher who is endowed with the light of knowledge arise in our nation." The translation of the second line of the Mantra is "May there arise brave, skilled archers, great warriors, rulers and soldiers Kshatriyas in our nation." Similarly the translation of the further lines of the Mantra in English is "In our nation, the Yajman's cow should be milky, the bull should be able to carry loads, and the horse should be swift. Women should be endowed with all virtues. Let all the charioteers be victorious, mighty and Yajman's sons be civilized. Let the clouds rain from time to time as needed in our nation. May crops and medicines mature with fruit and flowers. Yoga and Kshema should be practiced in the best manner in our nation. May the meanings of the mantras be fulfilled and may the desires be fulfilled. May the intelligence of your enemies be destroyed and your friends rise."
