= Maithil Brahmin Bhoj =

Sacred feast for Maithil Brahmin

Maithil Brahmin Bhoj (Maithili: मैथिल ब्राह्मण भोज) is a community feast or a traditional meal, often organized on various social and religious occasions in the Indian subcontinent. It's an integral part of Maithil culture, known for its elaborate preparations and the communal way of eating. The major occasions on which the Maithil Brahmin Bhoj is organised are Mundan, Upnayana, Kojagra, Maithil Vivah, Satyanarayan Puja, Shradha and annual death anniversary of the ancestors, etc. The Maithil Brahmin Bhoj is a religious feast and is considered as a sacred donation of food.

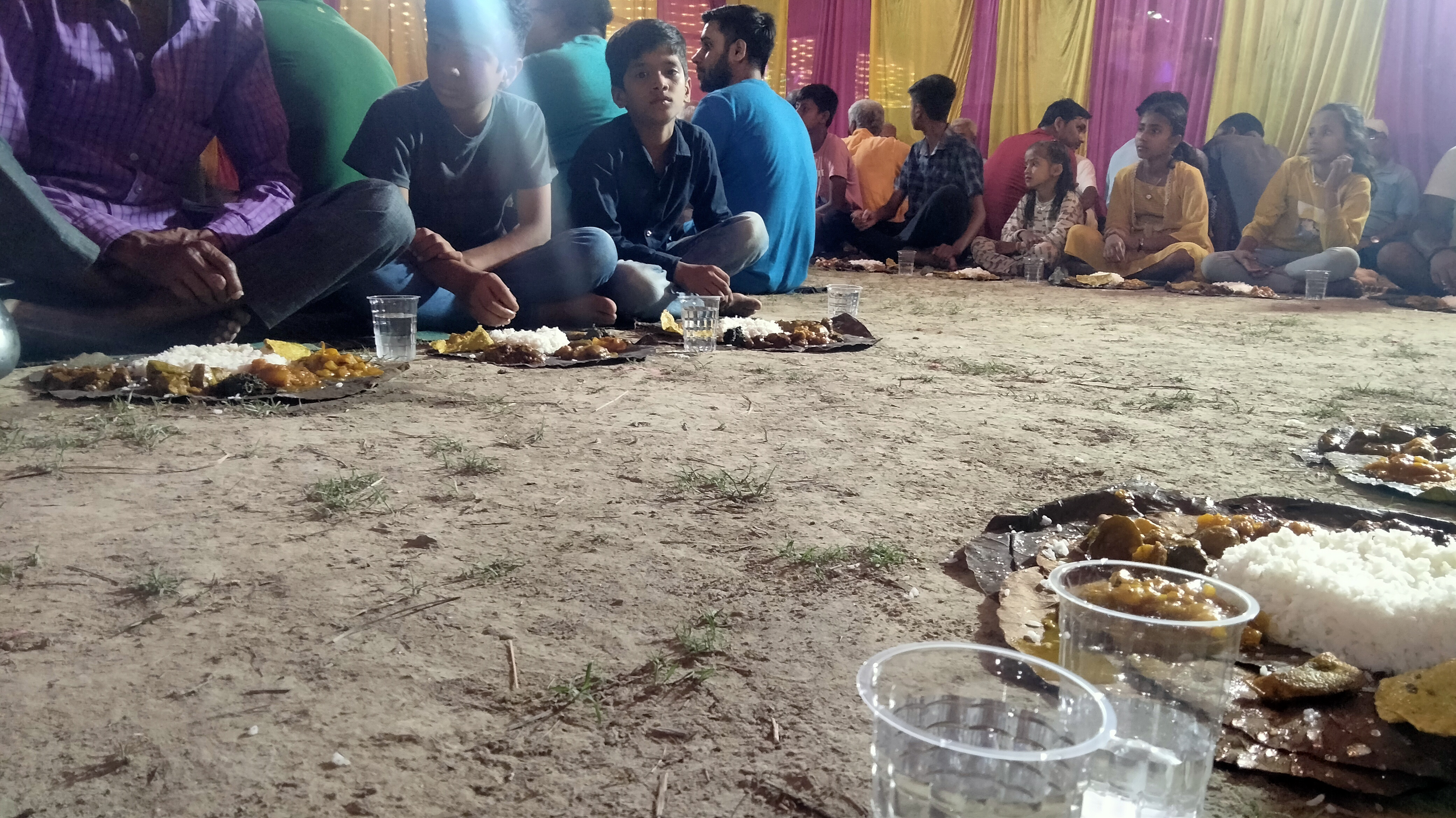
View of Maithil Brahmin Bhoj at Basuki Bihari village in the Mithila region of India

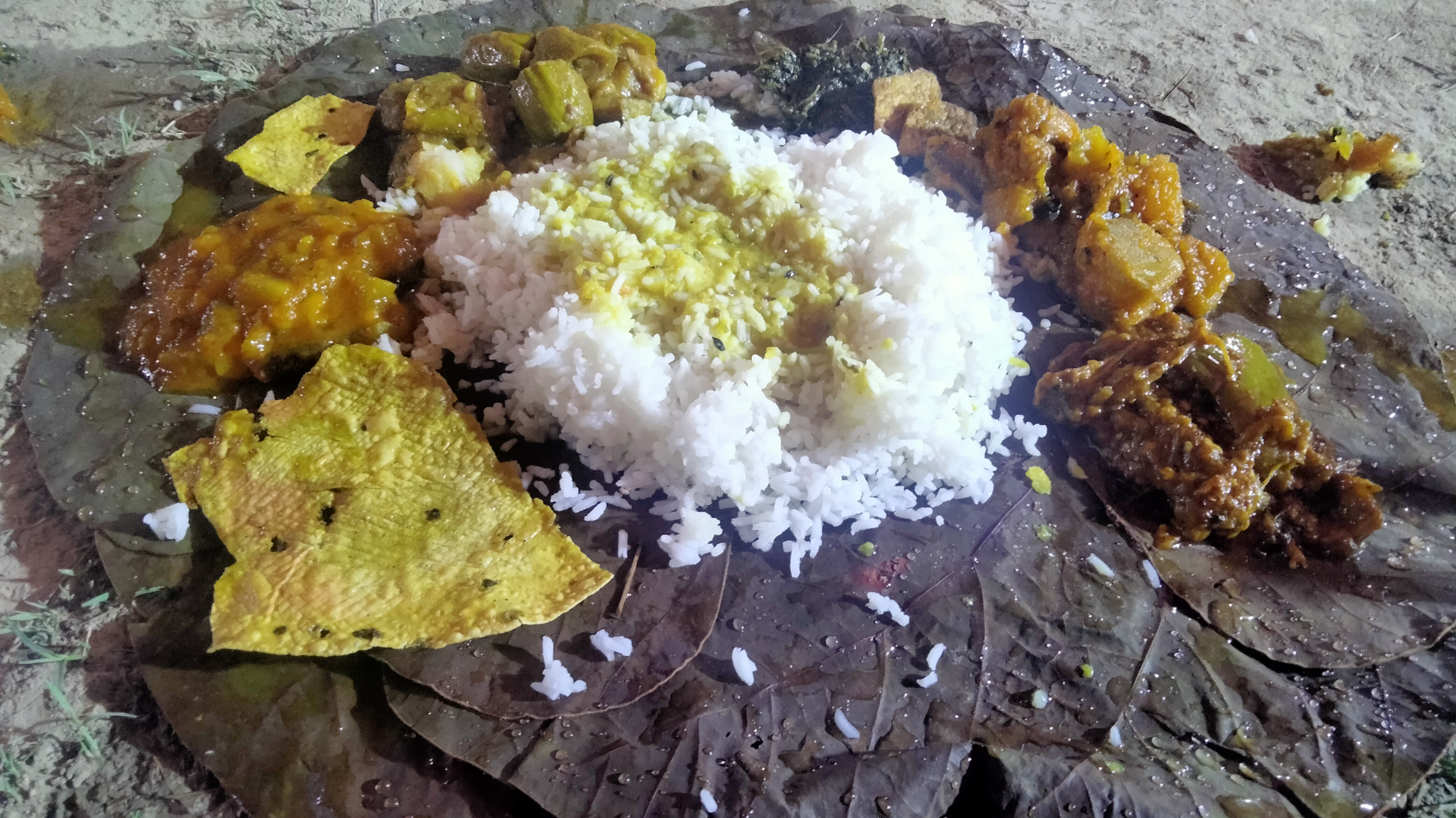
Dishes of Bhaat - Daal Bhoj of the Maithil Brahmin Bhoj in the Mithila region

== Description ==
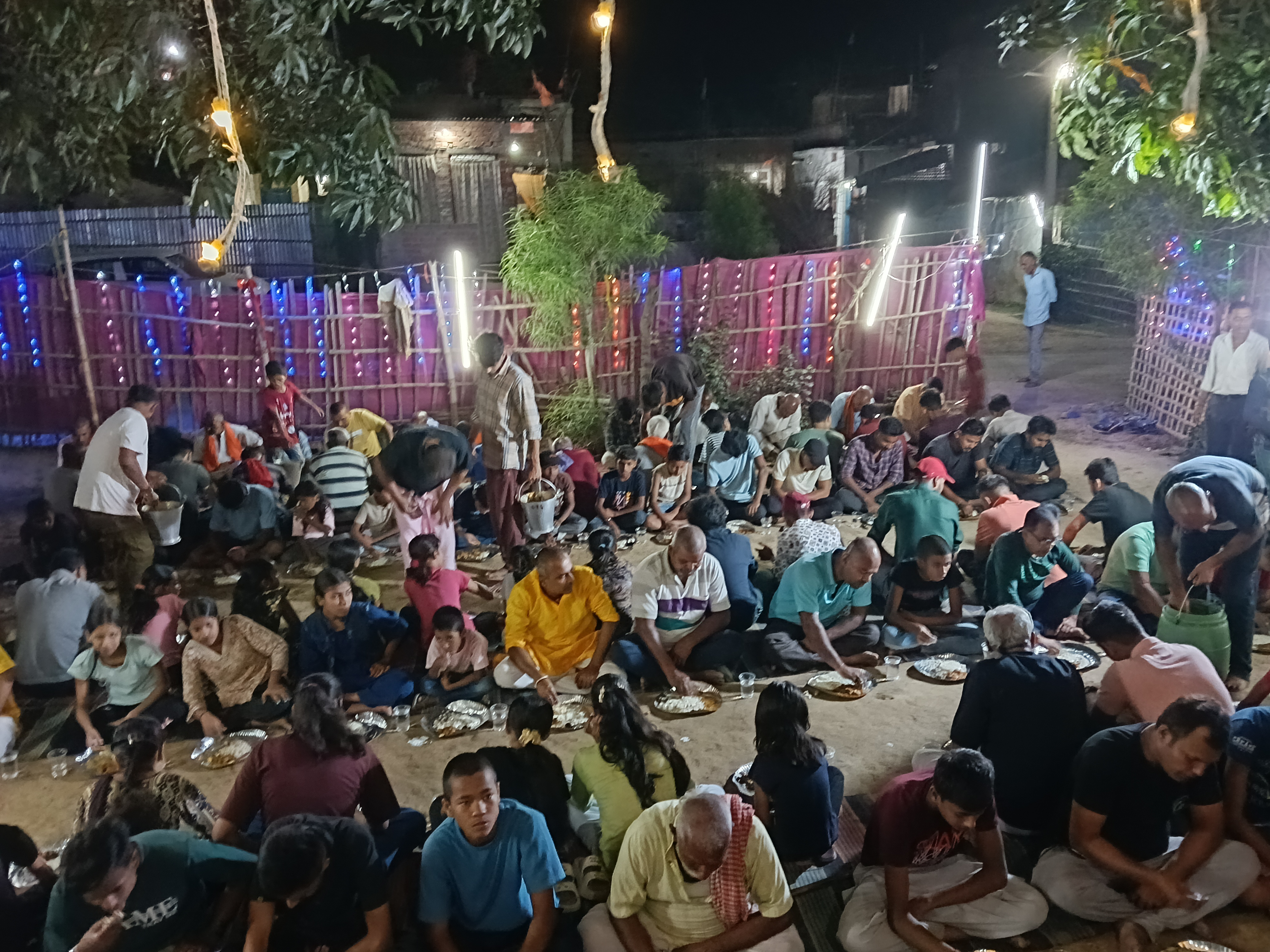
Maithil Brahmins Bhoj at Chaudhary Tol in Basuki Bihari North village on a occasion of Maithil Upanayan.

The Maithil Brahmins Bhoj has traditional meal featuring a variety of vegetables. The dishes of the community meal are cooked and prepared by the villagers themselves. The meals are prepared in abundance in which seasonal vegetables, fruits, sweets, curd, papad, and many other items are often included. These all items may be not possible to eat all at once. In the Mithila region, curd and sweets are considered mandatory items of the food to have in every community meal. According to the tradition in Mithila, Brahmins are first invited in the morning for taking part in the Brahmin Bhoj in the same day evening time or early night. The elderly Brahmins bring a lota (tumbler) from their home to drink water in the Bhoj. After the invited Brahmins reach at the courtyard of the organiser, they are arranged to sit in different rows on the ground of the courtyard. Then they are given a leaf plate to each individuals. After this, the leaf plate is cleaned by sprinkling water on it and serving of different types of dishes begins in the feast. Everything is served one by one. Then everyone starts eating together.

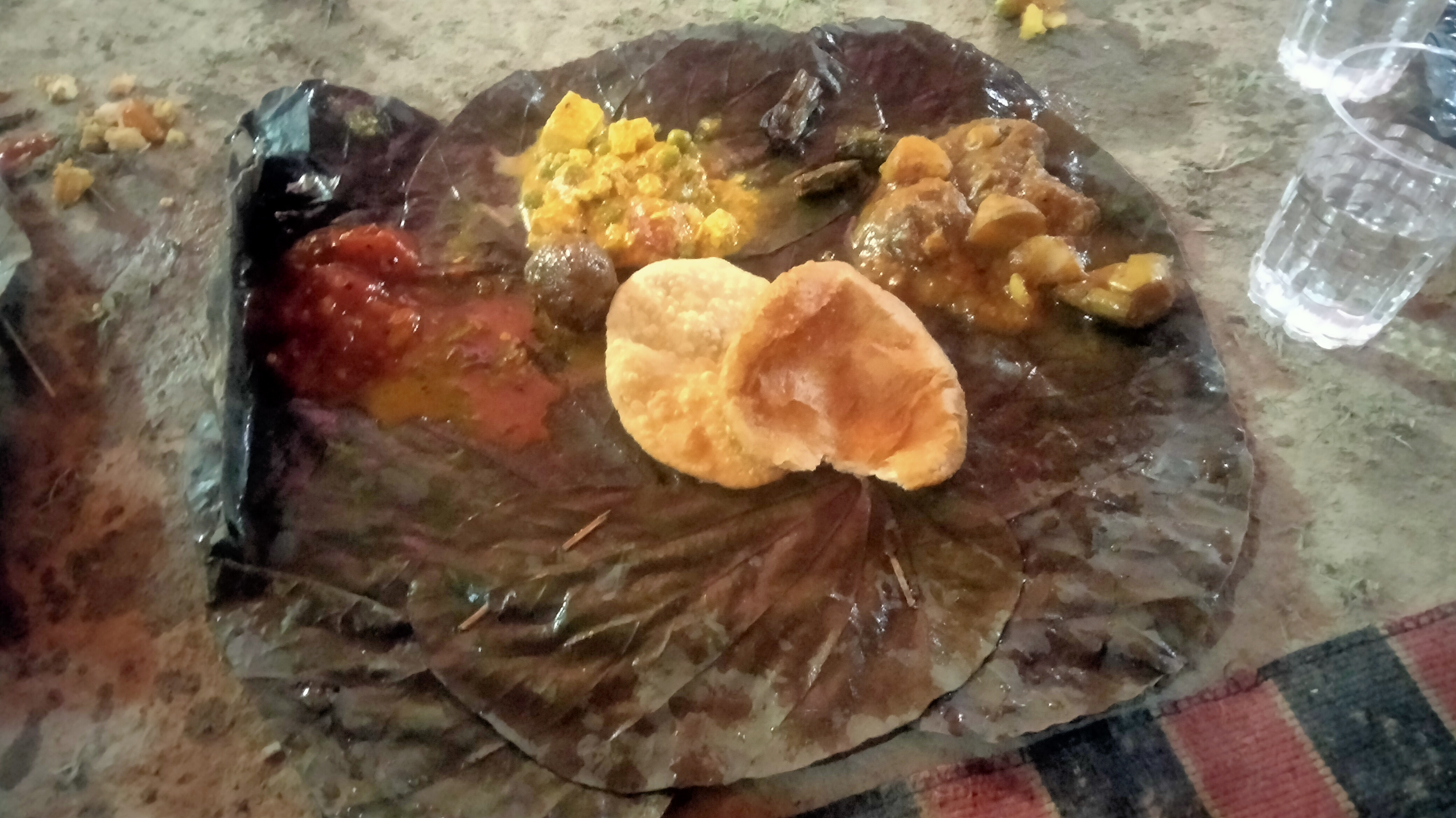
Dishes of Puri - Sabji Bhoj among Maithil Brahmins

A delicious sweet and hot drink item called Sakrauri prepared from Mithila's Makhana, is also served at some major feasts before the end of the feasts.

Among the Maithil Brahmins three types of Bhoj are popular. They are Bhaat - Daal, Puri - Sabji and Chura - Dahi. The tradition of Chura - Dahi Bhoj in the Mithila region exists since the Dhanusha Yajna organised at the court of King Janaka in Ramayana.

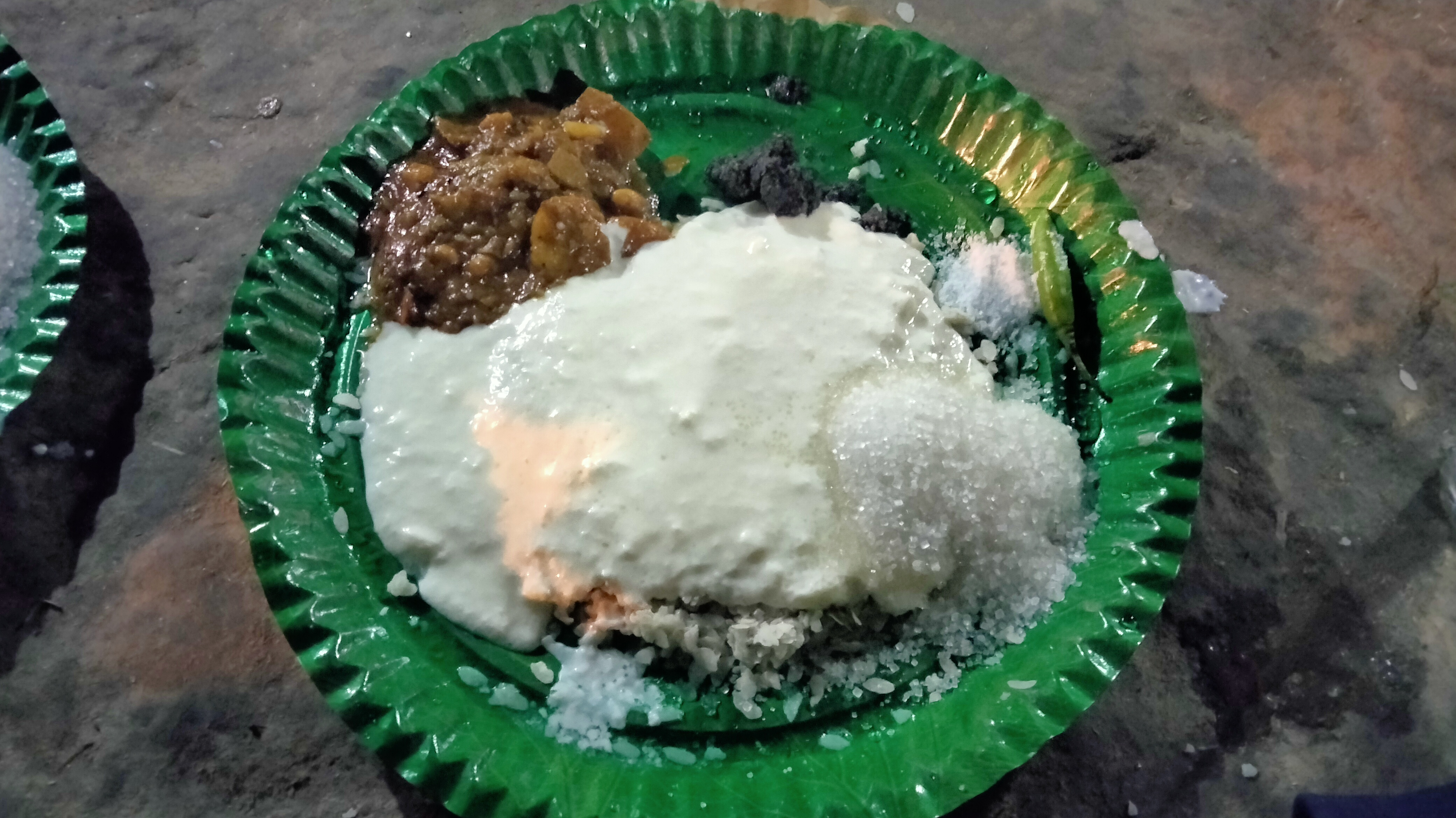
Dishes of Chura-Dahi Bhoj among Maithil Brahmins in the Mithila region of the Indian subcontinent

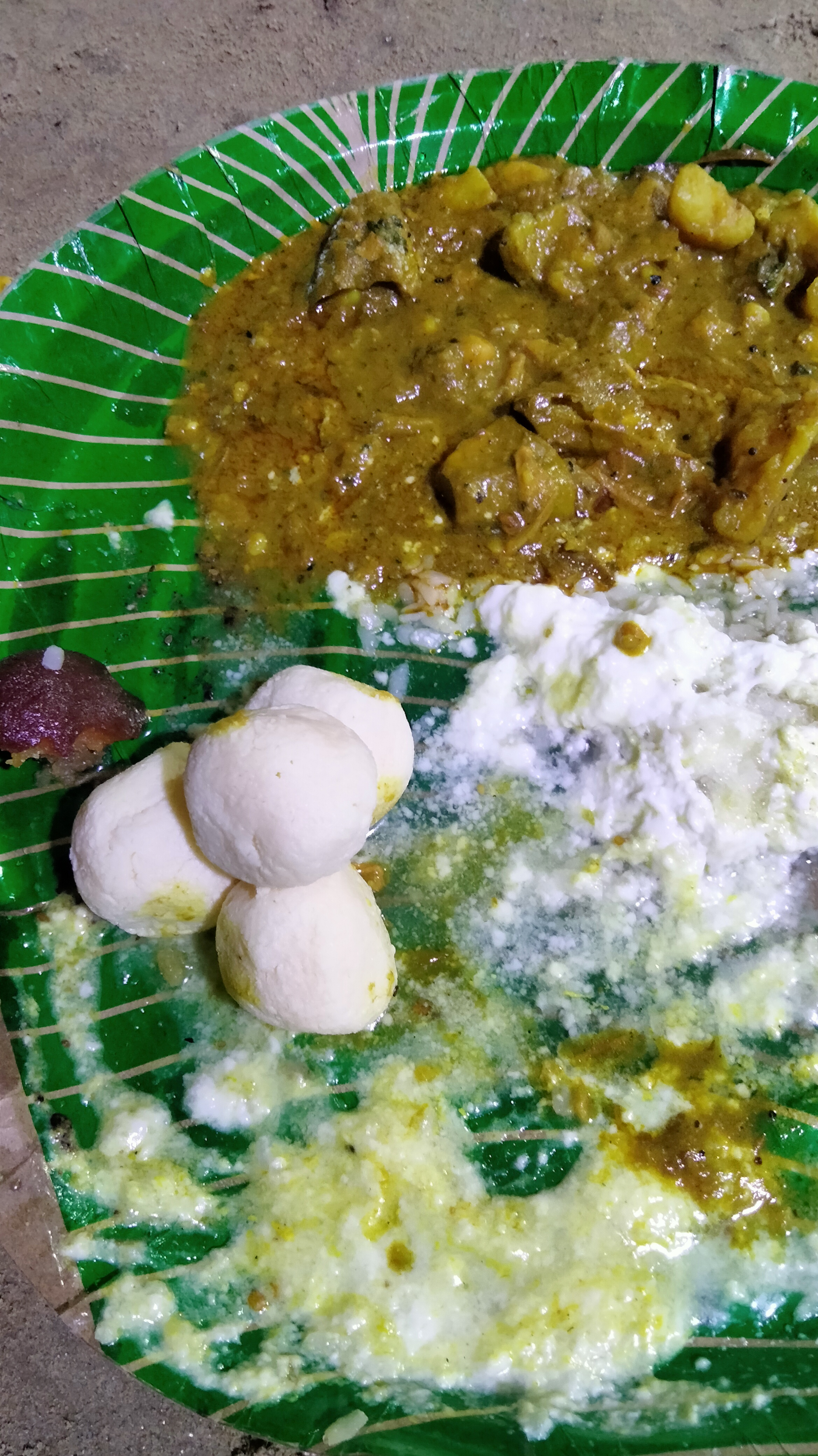
Rasgulla and Gulab Jamun in the Maithil Brahmin Bhoj
