= Mithila culture =

Culture from the Indian subcontinent

Mithila culture or Maithil culture refers to the culture which originated in the Mithila region of the Indian subcontinent. Mithila comprises Tirhut, Darbhanga, Kosi, Purnia, Munger, Bhagalpur and Santhal Pargana divisions of India and adjoining provinces of Koshi Province, Bagmati Pradesh, and Madhesh Province of Nepal.

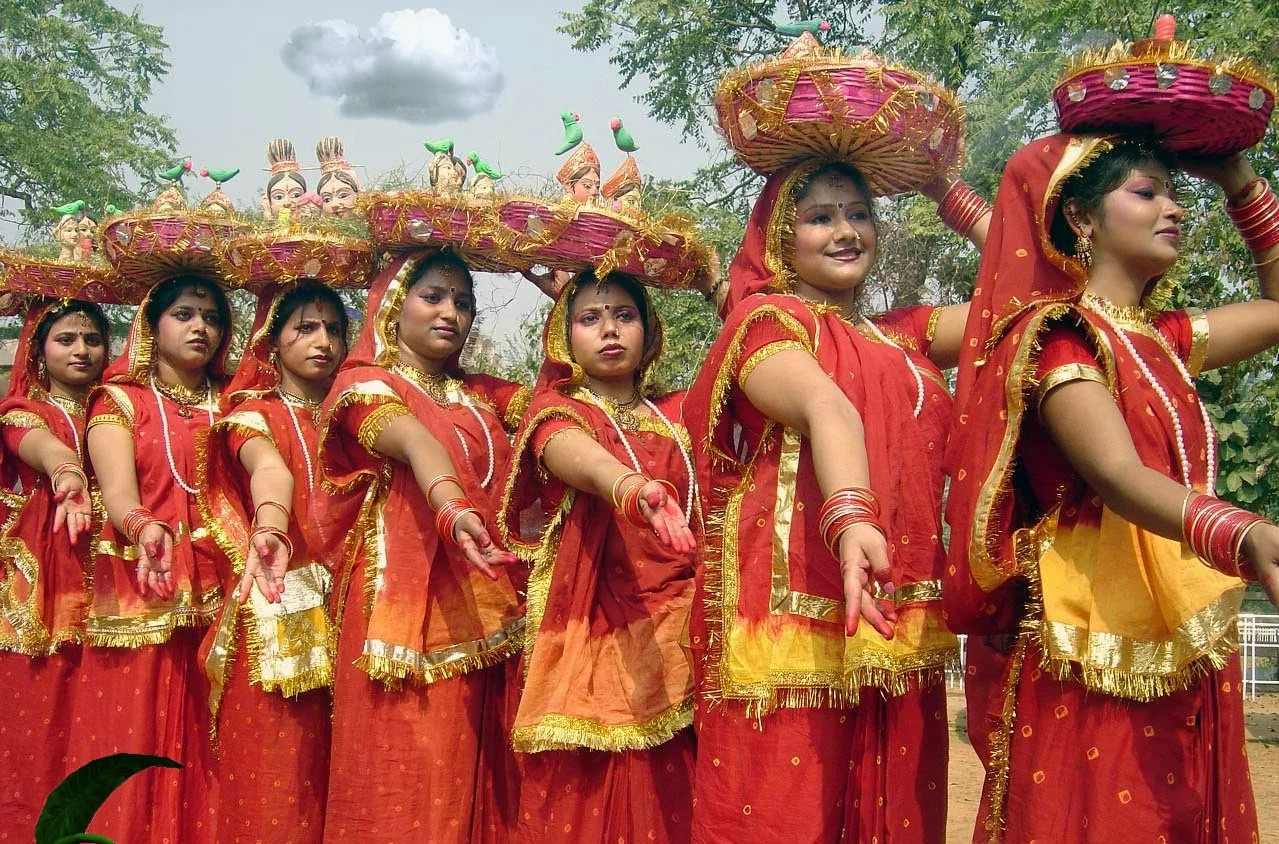
The festival of Sama Chakeba in the culture of Mithila.

In the Indian subcontinent, Mithila is considered as an important centre of civilization since ancient times. The culture of Mithila is comprised by the traditions, costumes, food, arts, songs, music, tunes, beliefs, folklores and legends, etc originated in the region. The Shaivism and the Shaktism in Mithila are among the ancient traditions followed by the Maithil community in the region. These two traditions have shaped the religious culture of the people in the Mithila region. Apart from these main streams, there are several indigenous folk traditions that have been the part of the religious culture in the region.

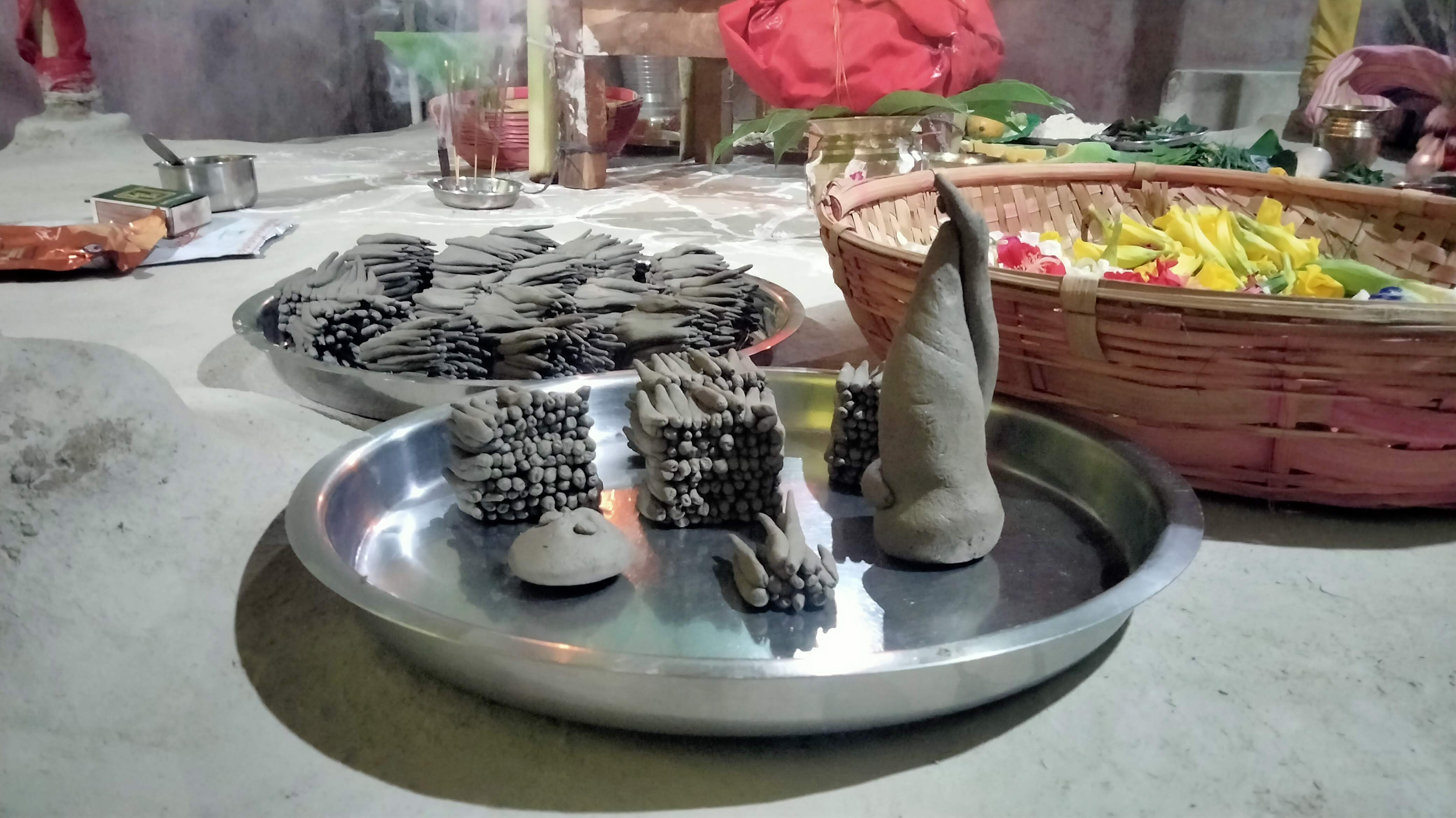
View of Parthiva Shivalinga Puja in the tradition of Shaivism in Mithila.

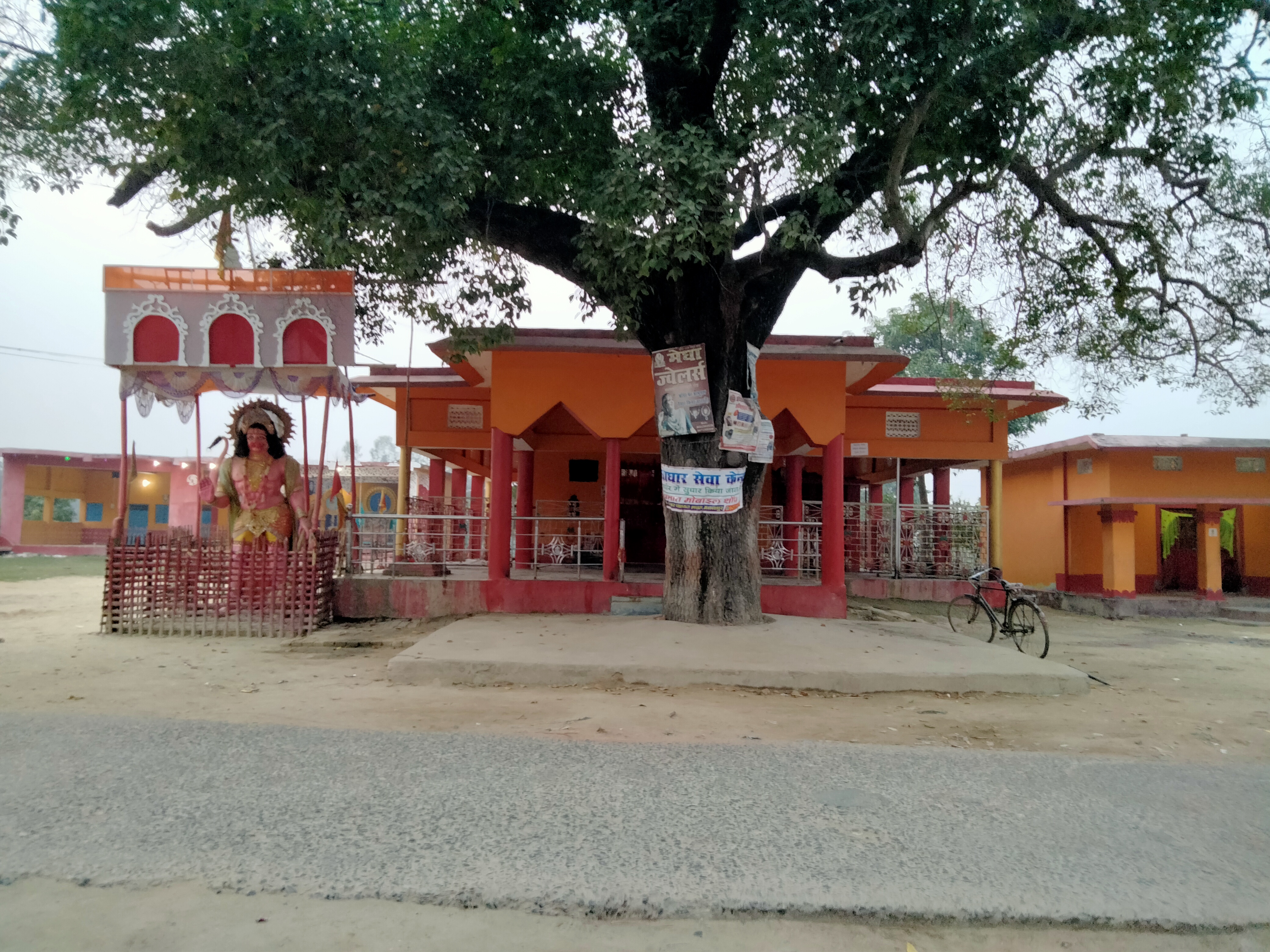
View of a Maharani Sthan, a worship place in Shaktism at the Basuki Bihari village in Mithila.

The costumes in the Mithila region might be primarily categorised into two categories. They are daily life costumes and occasional costumes. These costumes have been evolved from the traditional culture of Mithila. The traditional dress for men in Mithila are Kurta, Dhoti or Pyjama and Gamchha. They also wear Balla on their wrist and Mithila Paag on their head. The major costumes of the married women in the region are Sarees, Blause, and saaya, etc. In the lady community, unmarried girls often wear Kurti and frocks, etc. Similarly in the men community, nowadays young generation people generally were shirts and pants for daily life costumes.

Costumes of the Maithil community

== Saree style ==
In Mithila's all districts, Maithil women follow Maithil Saree Style.

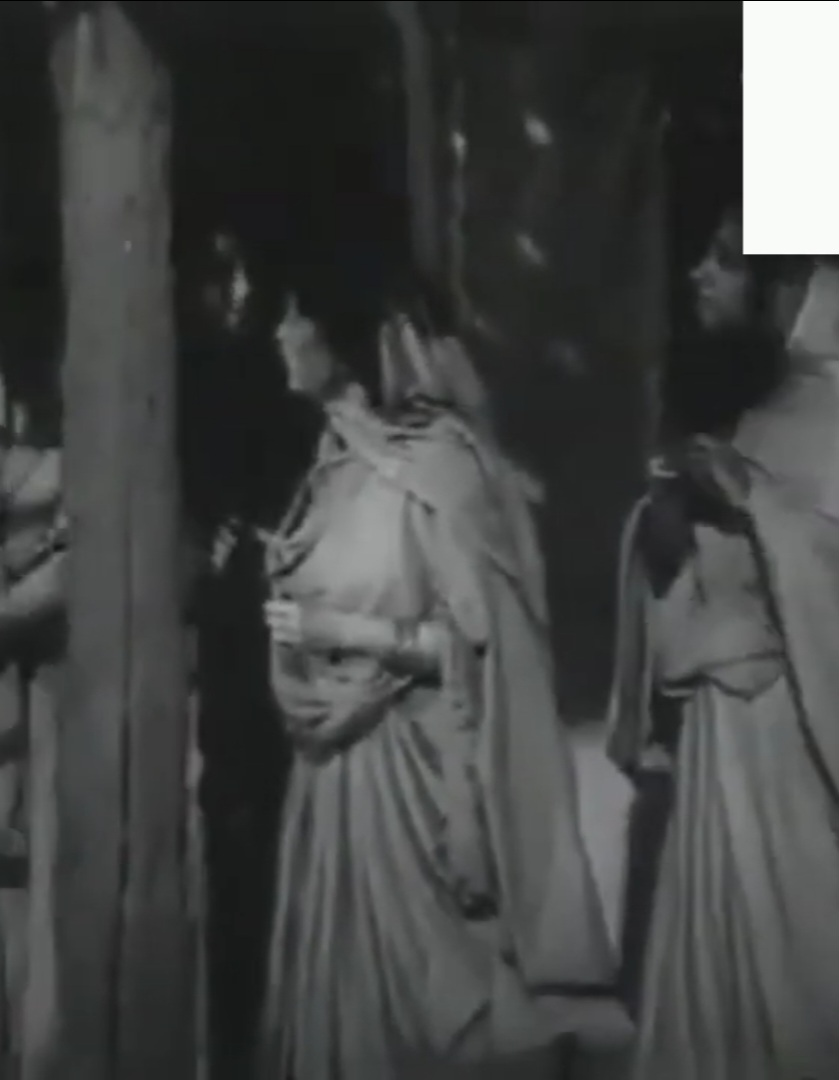
Maithil Saree Style in Kanyadan Maithili movie

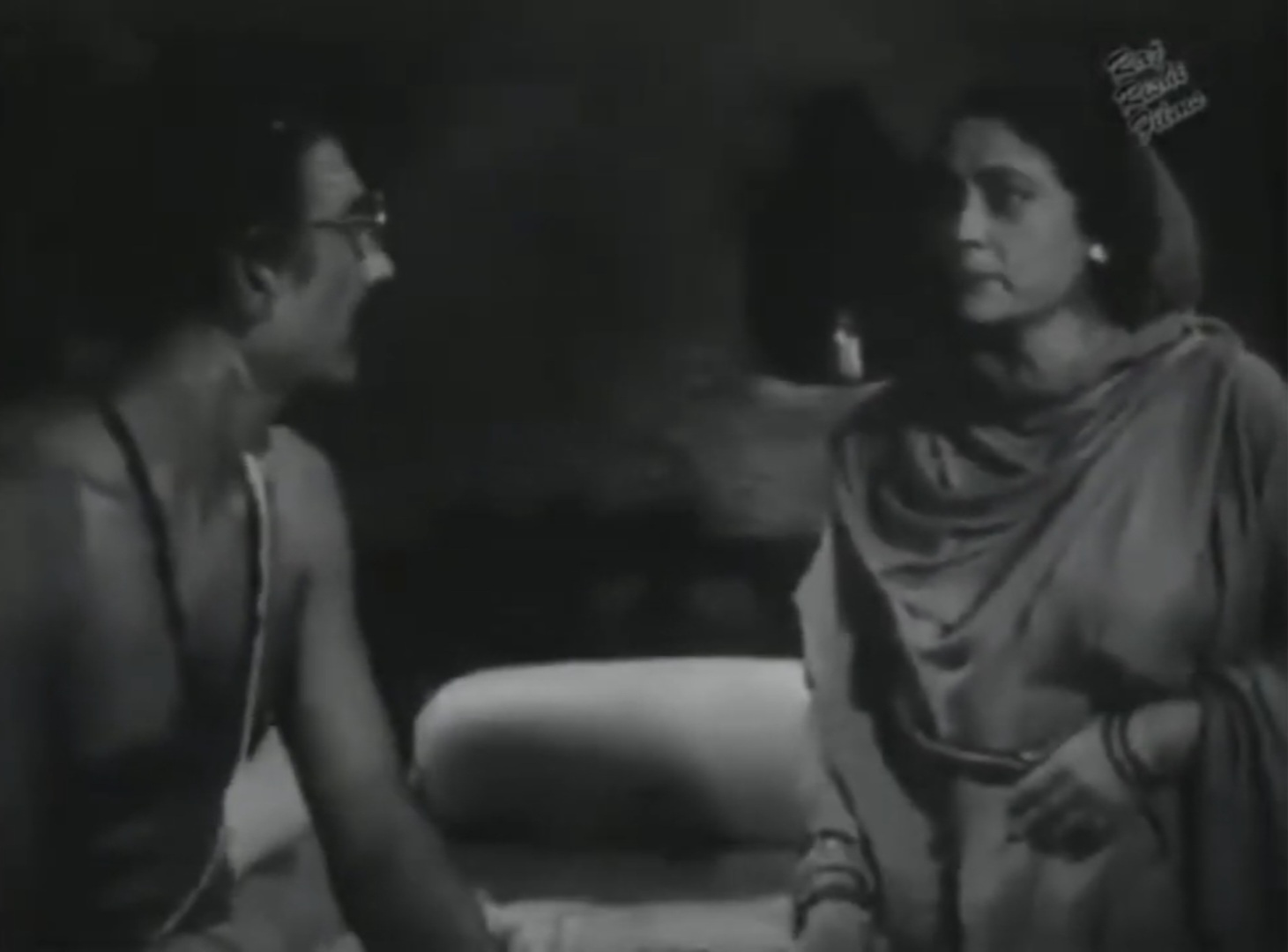
Maithil Saree Style in Kanyadan Maithili movie

Maithil women wear saree usually crafted from pure cotton for daily use and from silk for more occasions, traditional attire for the women of Mithila includes Jamdani, Banarisi and Bhagalpuri and many more. Many festivals are celebrated throughout the year in Mithila. Chhaith, Durga Puja and Kali puja is celebrated as perhaps the most important of all the celebrations of Mithila.

== Headgear ==
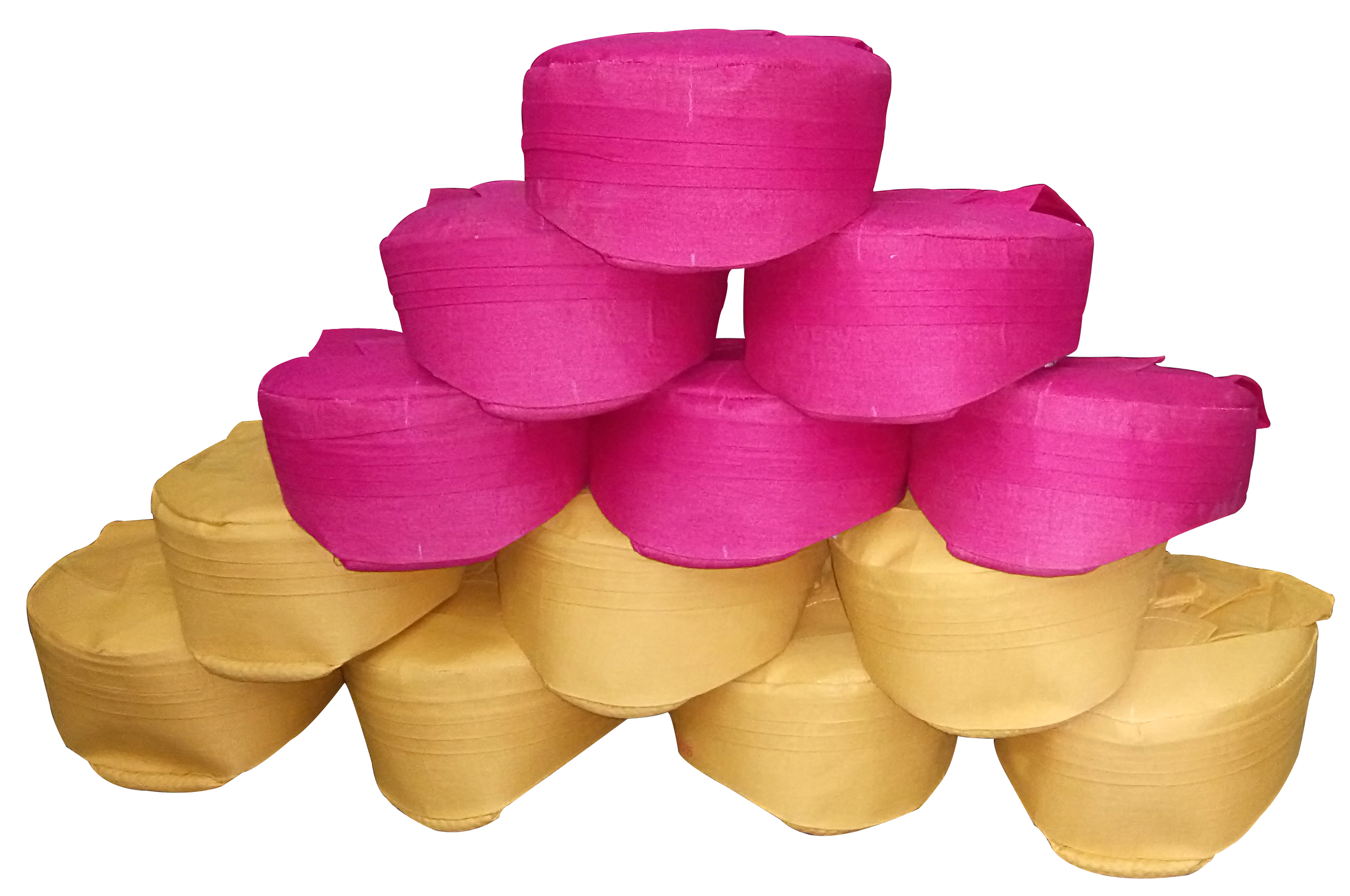
Paags of different colours on display

The Paag is a headdress native to the Mithila region worn by Maithil people. It is a symbol of honour and respect and a significant part of the Maithil culture.

Darbhanga MP Gopal Jee Thakur popularised the culture of honouring people with Mithila’s Paag on their head.

== Dances ==
Jhijhiya and Domkach are the Cultural Dance of Mithila region of India and Nepal. Jhijhiya is mostly performed at time of Dusshera, in dedication to Durga Bhairavi, the goddess of victory. While performing jhijhiya, women put lanterns made of clay on their head and they balance it while they dance. Jhijhiya is performed in Darbhanga, Muzaffarpur, Madhubani and their Neighbour Districts. Domkach is also a folk dance of the Mithila region.

== Crafts ==
Traditional Sikki grass handicrafts of Mithila

The crafts of the Mithila region represent a vital aspect of its cultural identity, alongside its art, music, and traditions. Mithila has a long legacy of craftsmanship that reflects both aesthetic expression and community livelihood.

=== Traditional Handicrafts ===
Mithila is home to a variety of traditional crafts, many of which are practised primarily by women artisans. Some of the major craft traditions include:

- Sikki craft: One of the most traditional crafts of Mithila, Sikki involves weaving fine golden grass (known as Sikki) into decorative items, baskets, boxes, idols, and ornaments. Women artisans use simple needles, creating intricate designs used in rituals and everyday life. It has also been granted a Geographical Indication (GI) tag, recognising its cultural and regional uniqueness.
- Terracotta and pottery work: Clay lamps, figurines, and ritual vessels are crafted with intricate hand-painted designs drawn from mythological and natural themes.
- Textile weaving and embroidery: Hand-woven saris, stoles, and fabrics are decorated with embroidery or printed borders reflecting Maithil cultural motifs.
- Paper-mâché and handmade paper crafts: Artisans use handmade paper to produce greeting cards, folders, and wall hangings often adorned with Mithila-style motifs.

=== Cultural Significance ===
Mithila crafts are deeply connected to the region’s rituals, festivals, and social life. Decorative and symbolic items are prepared for occasions such as weddings and Chhath. The crafts also function as a medium of cultural preservation and as a source of rural livelihood, especially for women.

== Paintings ==
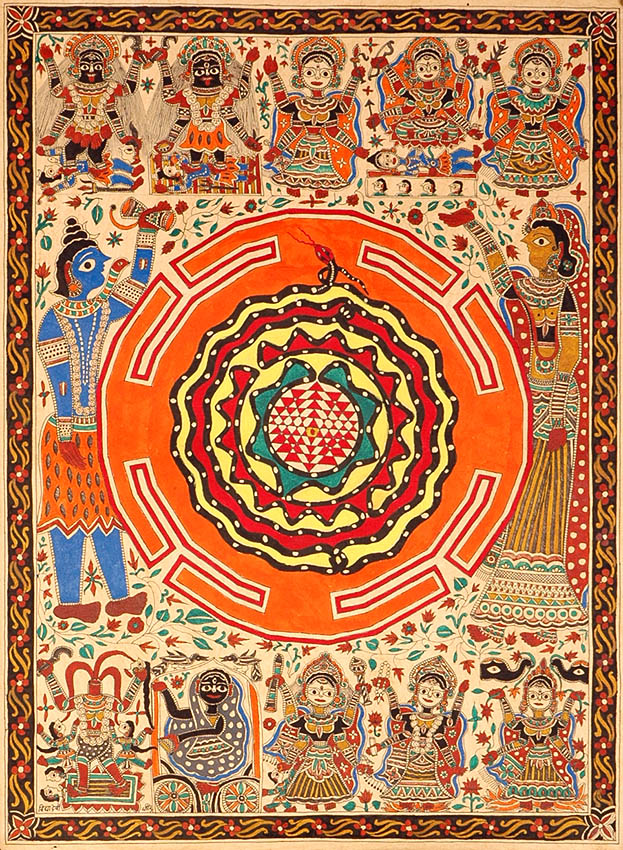
Sri Yantra diagram with the Ten Mahavidyas depicted in Madhubani Painting

Mithila painting is practiced in the Mithila region of India and Nepal. It was traditionally created by the women of different communities of the Mithila region. It is named after Mithila in India which is where it originated. This painting as a form of wall art was practiced widely throughout the region; the more recent development of painting on paper and canvas originated among the villages around Madhubani, Begusarai, Darbhanga, Naugachia and it is these latter developments that may correctly be referred to as Madhubani art, Begusarai Art, Darbhanga Art, Naugachia Art.

== Cuisine ==
Some traditional Maithil dishes are:

- Dahi-Chura
- Vegetable of Arikanchan
- Ghooghni
- Tarua of Tilkor
- Bada
- Badee
- Dalpithhi
- Maachh
- Mangso
- Irhar
- Pidakia
- Dal bhat
- Makhan Payas
- Anarasa
- Bagiya
- churlay
- Murlay

== Yatra ==
- Mithila Madhya Parikrama
- Sitamarhi Dham Parikrama

== Main festivals ==
- Chhaith: Prayers during Chhath puja are dedicated to the solar deity, Surya, to show gratitude and thankfulness
- Saama-Chakeba: includes folk theater and song, celebrates the love between brothers and sisters and is based on a legend recounted in the Puranas.
- Oghaniya Chhaith (Chhotka Pabni): Very popular with the name of "Chhotka-Pabni" and Dopaharka Aragh in Mithila.Celebrated in Oghan Shukla-paksha Shasthi tithi.
- Baisakkha Chhaith (Chhotka Pabni): This is celebrated in month of Baishakh Shukla-paksha Shasthi tithi and It is also called Chhotka-Pabni(Dopaharka Aragh) in Mithila.
- Chaurchan: Along with Lord Ganesha, Lord Vishnu, Goddess Parvati and the moon god is worshipped. The story of Chorchan Puja is also heard on this day after that arghya is offered to the moon god (Chandra Deva).
- Jitiya: celebrated mainly in Indian states of Bihar, Jharkhand and Uttar Pradesh and Nepal; mothers fast (without water) for wellbeing of their children.
- Vivaha Panchami: Hindu festival celebrating the wedding of Rama and Sita. It is observed on the fifth day of the Shukla paksha or waxing phase of moon in the Agrahayana month (November – December) as per Maithili calendar and in the month of Margashirsha in the Hindu calendar.
- Sita Navami
- Ganga Dussehra: Ganga Dussehra, also known as Gangavataran, is a Hindu festival celebrated by Maithils in Mokshdhaam Simaria Dhaam (The Welcome Gate of Mithila). avatarana (descent) of the Ganges. It is believed by Hindus that the holy river Ganges descended from heaven to earth on this day.
- Kalpwas: Celebrated in Every Kartik Month in Simaria Dhaam, Begushorai.
- Kojagiri (Lachhmi Puja): harvest festival marking the end of monsoon season
- Paata Puja (Durga Maay Aagmon)
- Khutti Puja (Ritual of Durga Puja)
- Mohalaya
- Durga Puja: a ten-day festival, of which the last five are of the most significance. is an important festival in the Shaktism tradition of Hinduism. It is practiced according to the Mithila tradition of Durga Puja. It marks the victory of goddess Durga in her battle against the shape-shifting asura, Mahishasura. (Note: In the Shakta tradition of Hinduism, many of the stories about obstacles and battles have been considered as metaphors for the divine and demonic within each human being, with liberation being the state of self-understanding whereby a virtuous nature & society emerging victorious over the vicious.) Thus, the festival epitomizes the victory of good over evil, though it is also in part a harvest festival celebrating the goddess as the motherly power behind all of life and creation.
- Jatara Parva: traditionally celebrated on the day of Vijayadashami (Dussehra)
- Kali Puja: dedicated to the Hindu goddess Kali, celebrated on the new moon day Dipannita Amavasya of the Hindu month Kartik
- Saraswati Puja: marks the preparation for the arrival of spring. The festival is celebrated by people of Dharmic religions in the South Asian countries in different ways depending on the region. Vasant Panchami also marks the start of preparation for Holika and Holi, which take place forty days later.
- Rama Navami: celebrates the descent of Vishnu as the Rama avatar, through his birth to King Dasharatha and Queen Kausalya in Ayodhya, Kosala.
- Basanti Puja (Chaiti Durga Puja)
- Til Sakraait
- Aakhar Bochhor
- Pahun Shashthi
- Naag Panchami
- Barsaait
- Vishwakarma Puja
- Holi
- Ghadi Paabain
- Madhushravani
- Lavan Paavain
- Raib Parva
- Mithila Jhulnotsav - A fifteen-day annual festival dedicated to Lord Rama and Goddess Sita.

== Worship places ==
- Brahma Sthan
- Gosaunik Ghar
- Maharani Sthan

== See also ==
- Indian culture
- Nepalese culture
- Maithili language
- Mithila, India
- Mithila, Nepal
- Tourism in Mithila
- Maithil Brahmin Bhoj
- Chumavan
- Mithila Cultural Museum
- Aripan
- Tirhut style temples
- Mithila Museum, Japan

== Sources ==
- Daniélou, Alain (1991). The Myths and Gods of India: The Classic Work on Hindu Polytheism from the Princeton Bollingen Series. Inner Traditions / Bear & Co. ISBN 978-0-89281-354-4.
- Doniger, Wendy (1999). Merriam-Webster's Encyclopedia of World Religions. Merriam-Webster. ISBN 978-0-87779-044-0.
- Donner, Henrike (2016). Domestic Goddesses: Maternity, Globalization and Middle-class Identity in Contemporary India. Routledge. ISBN 978-1-317-14848-7.
- Foulston, Lynn; Abbott, Stuart (2009). Hindu Goddesses: Beliefs and Practices. Sussex Academic Press. ISBN 978-1-902210-43-8.
- Kinsley, David (1988). Hindu Goddesses: Visions of the Divine Feminine in the Hindu Religious Tradition. University of California Press. ISBN 978-0-520-90883-3.
- Lochtefeld, James G (2002). The Illustrated Encyclopedia of Hinduism: A-M. The Rosen Publishing Group. ISBN 978-0-8239-3179-8.
- McDaniel, June (2004). Offering Flowers, Feeding Skulls: Popular Goddess Worship in West Bengal. Oxford University Press. ISBN 978-0-19-534713-5.
- McDermott, Rachel Fell (2001). Mother of My Heart, Daughter of My Dreams: Kali and Uma in the Devotional Poetry of Bengal. Oxford University Press. ISBN 978-0-19-803071-3.
- Rodrigues, Hillary (2003). Ritual Worship of the Great Goddess: The Liturgy of the Durga Puja with Interpretations. SUNY Press. ISBN 978-0-7914-8844-7.
