= Sama Chakeva =

Hindu festival of Mithila region

Saama Chakeva
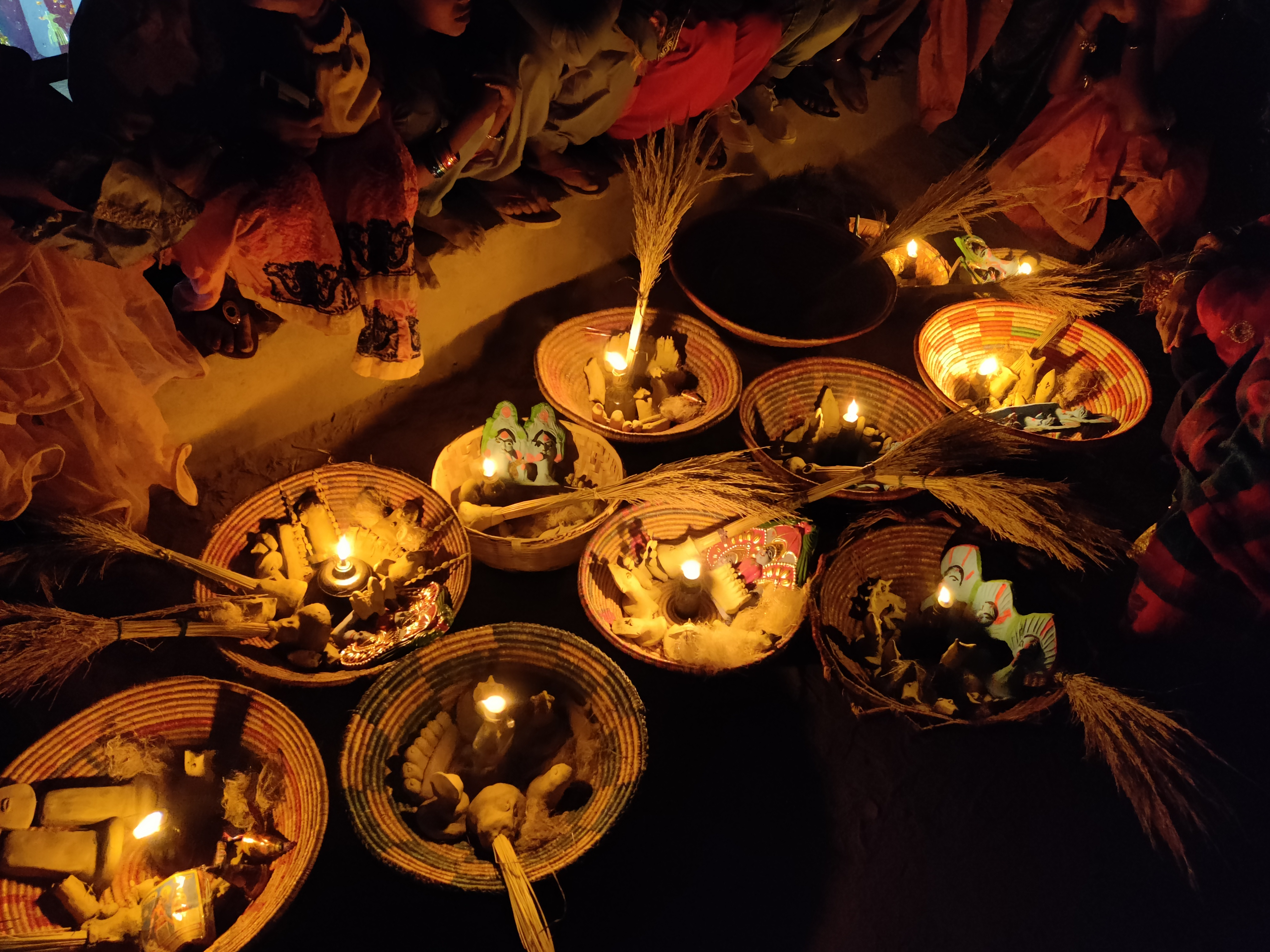
- Sama Chakeva being celebrated in Sarlahi-Siraha district of Madhesh Province, Nepal
- Also called: Saama Khela
- Observed by: Maithils and Tharu people (India & Nepal)
- Type: Cultural, historical, religious
- Significance: Bond between siblings
- Begins: The day after Kartik Shashthi
- Ends: Kartik Purnima
- Duration: 7 days

Saama Chakeba is a Hindu festival, originating from the Mithila region of the Nepal and North Bihar. It is a festival of unity. It is celebrated in November and commences when birds begin their migration from the Himalayas down towards the plains of Madhesh and Bihar. According to the Hindustan Times, the festival, which includes folk theater and song, celebrates the love between brothers and sisters and is based on a legend recounted in the Puranas. It is celebrated in Indo-Nepalese region by Maithils & Tharu people.

An interesting aspect of Sama Chakeva is its environmental message. The festival coincides with the seasonal migration of birds from the Himalayas in Nepal to the plains, and the clay bird idols are a tribute to these migratory birds. This reflects the Maithili people’s deep respect for nature and highlights the interconnectedness of all living beings.

== Mythological significance ==
It tells the story of Sama, a daughter of Krishna who had been falsely accused of wrongdoing. Her father punished her by turning her into a bird, but the love and sacrifice of her brother eventually allowed her to regain human form. It is a story passed down through generations, forming an essential part of the cultural fabric of Mithila.

== Celebration ==
The celebration starts from the night of Chhath puja. This is the 7th day of the month of Kartik. Young, mostly unmarried girls assemble near the ghats of chhath with a basket containing small idols of sama and chakeva, candles, kohl, clay made daily use appliances etc. at night.

The statuettes carried by the girls comprise, Shama, Chakeva, Chugala, Jhailwala (cymbalist), Mirdangiya (drummer), Brindavan, a wild fowl, a bumblebee and a dog, the characters of the Shama Chakeva festival.

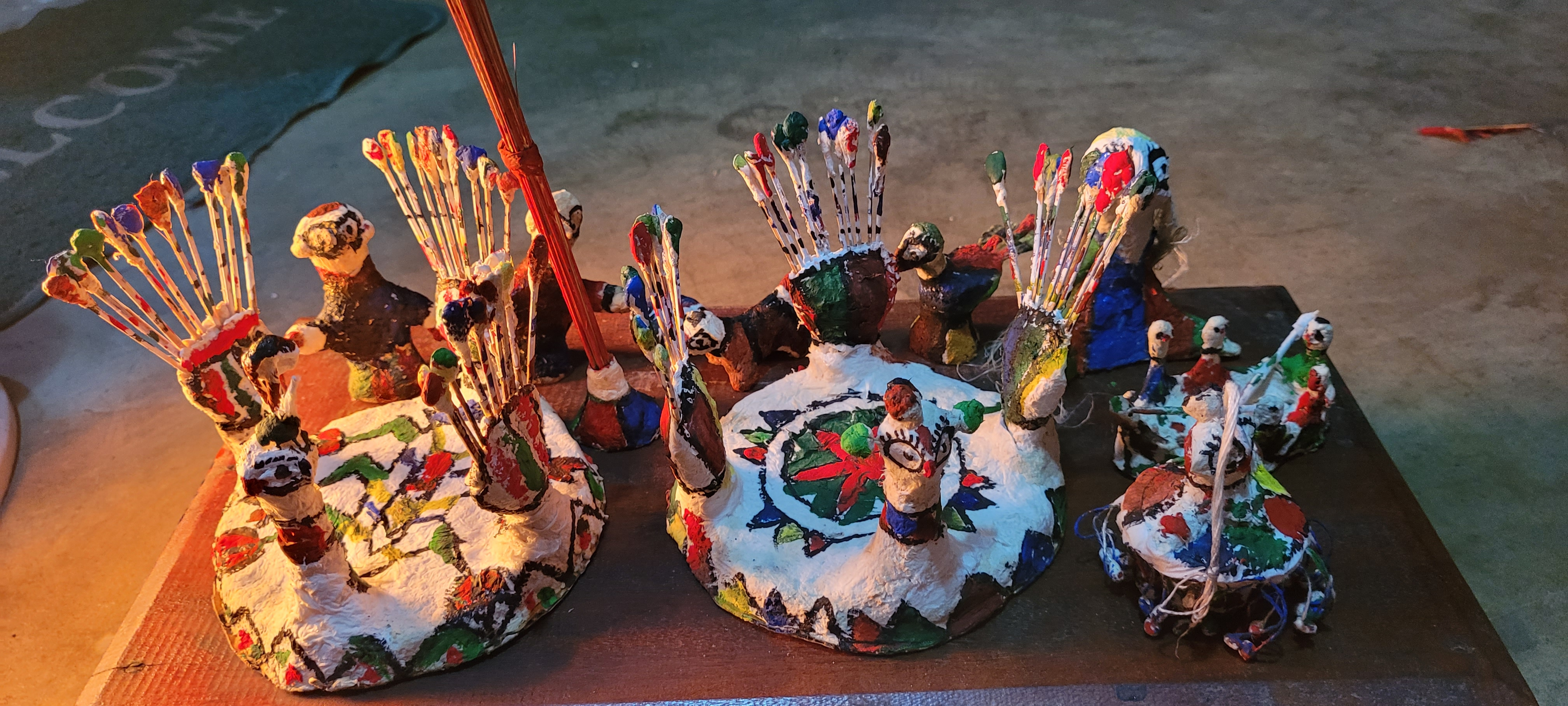
Shama and her companions

They sing traditional songs, perform some rituals like making kohl, exchanging baskets. This celebration continues till Kartik Purnima. On the auspicious occasion of Kartik Purnima, girls take a dip in river and the idols of Sama and Chakeva are immersed in the river.

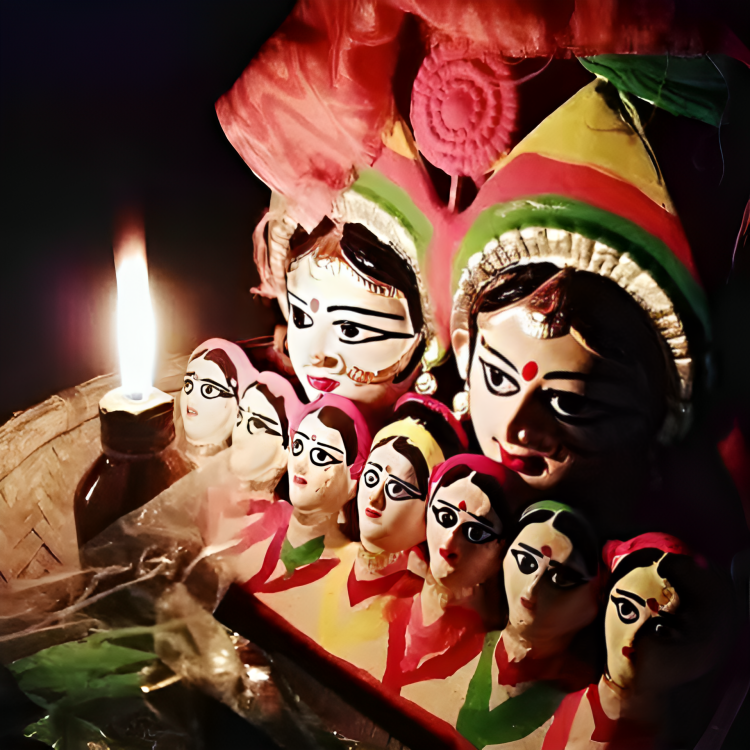
Idols of Sama and Chakeba

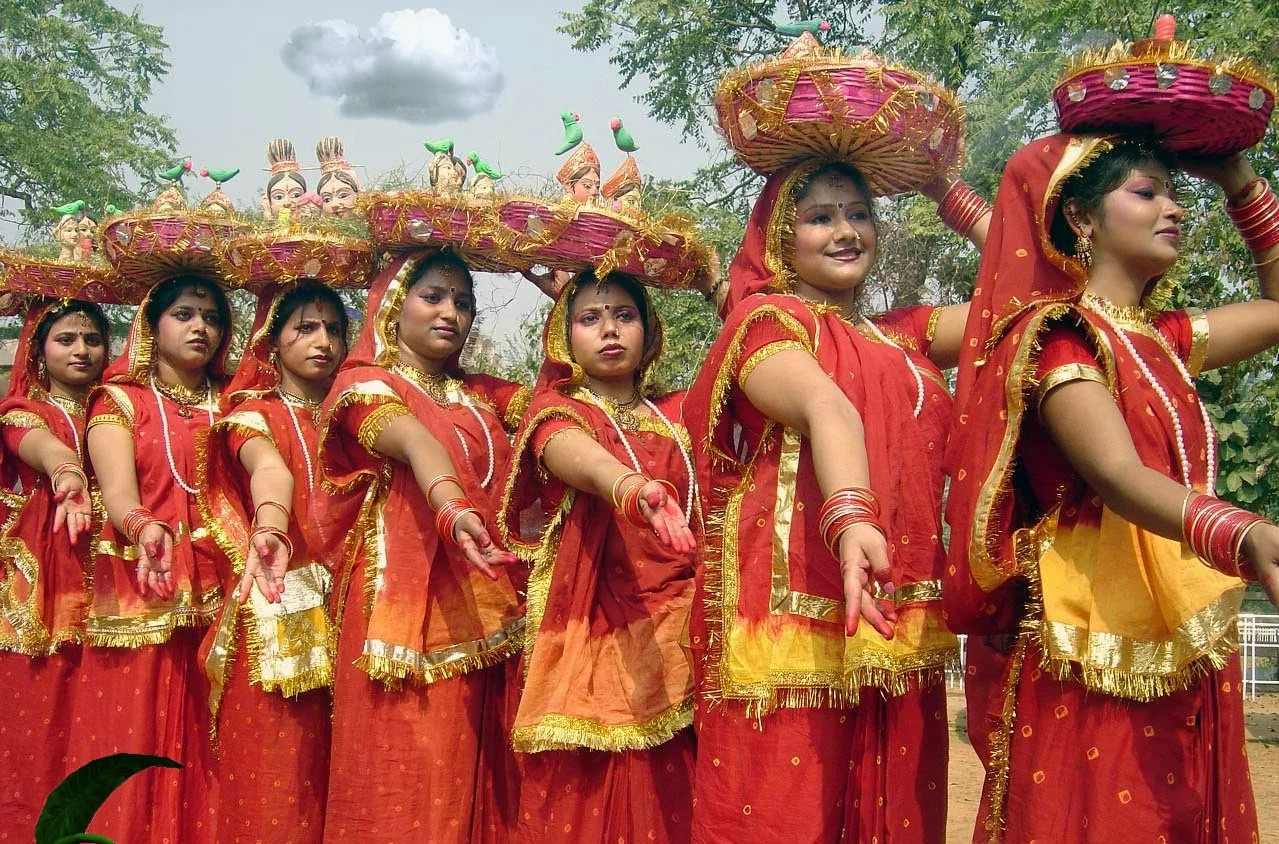
Celebration by Maithils

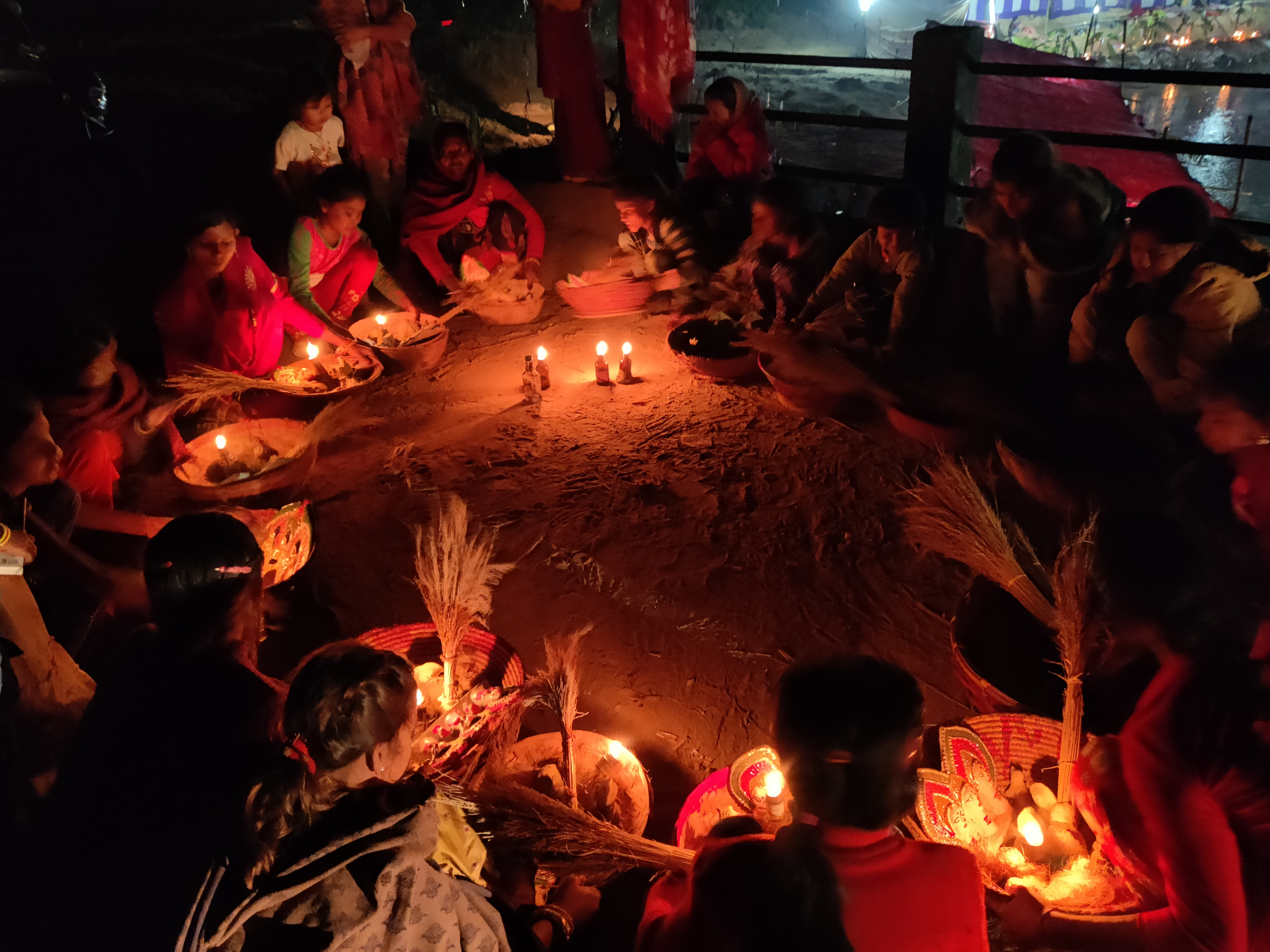
Women celebrating Sama Chakeba

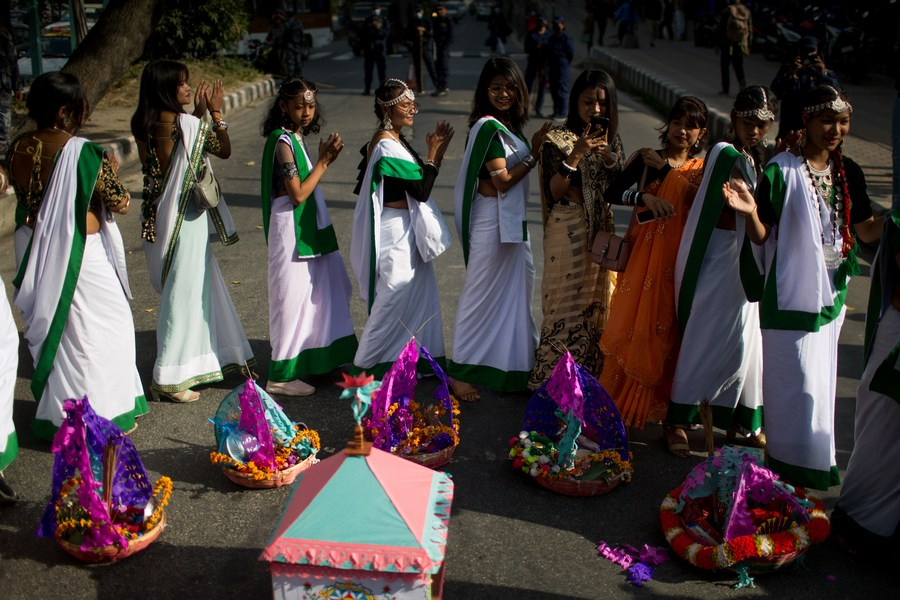
Celebration by Tharu people of Mithila

== Traditional Songs / Geet ==
An Eastern Tharu folk song sung during Shama Chakeva festival while giving 'ashik' or blessing to brothers.

''Tohe Badka Bhaiya ho''

''Sama Khele Chalali''

''Chugala Koṭhi Chhaur Bhaiya Koṭhi Chaur''

''Jotala Kheta Me Baisih He''

''Sama Khele Geliyai ge Bahini''

and Many more...
