= Dalaan =

Common social open space house in Mithila

Dalaan (Maithili: दलान ) (also written as Dalan) refers to a separate open space house situated at a courtyard attached to the home of a Maithil family in the Mithila region of the Indian subcontinent. It serves as a common house for social gatherings, relaxation, and various household activities of the family. In traditional Mithila homes, the "dalaan" would have been a very important part of the house, a place where families would gather. It is also built as the common place of relaxation for the people of a village in Mithila.

== Description ==
The Dalaan in Mithila, more than just an architectural feature, is a cultural and social cornerstone, reflecting the region's unique way of life. It is a space that embodies the essence of Mithila's traditional homes, acting as a hub for family interactions, social gatherings, and a tangible connection to the past. It is a semi-public space within the confines of a home. In the often hot and humid climate of Mithila, this open area provided much-needed ventilation and a respite from the sun. It is a place where families gathered during the day, where children play, and where elders share stories and wisdom. More than just a space, it is a living, breathing entity, adapting to the rhythms of daily life.

=== Types ===
In larger, more affluent homes, the Dalaan may be expansive, with intricately carved pillars and decorative features. It is here that guests are received, and important family events are held. In smaller homes, the Dalaan may be more modest, but it still serves its essential function as a communal space. The design ensures that the inner private spaces of the home maintain a level of separation, while the Dalaan acts as a bridge between the outside world and the family's intimate sphere.

=== Cultural connection ===
Culturally, the Dalaan is a stage for many important rituals and traditions. During festivals and religious ceremonies, it transforms into a vibrant space filled with music, dance, and the aroma of traditional sweets. It is here that family members and neighbors came together to celebrate, reinforcing community bonds and preserving cultural heritage.

=== Learning place ===
The Dalaan is also a place of learning, where children absorb the traditions and values of their families and communities through stories, songs, and interactions with elders. In the early period of Mithila, the Dalaan of the eminent Indian philosopher Mandana Mishra was a great centre of learning Mimansa Shastra of the Indian philosophy in the subcontinent.
