= Mithila Cultural Museum =

Cultural heritage measum of Mithila

- मिथिला सांस्कृतिक संग्रहालय
- Established: Proposed
- Location: Darbhanga, Mithila
- Type: Cultural Museum
- Founder: Amit Shah

Mithila Cultural Museum (Maithili: मिथिला सांस्कृतिक संग्रहालय) is a proposed museum to be built in the city of Darbhanga in the Mithila region of Bihar in India. It was proposed by the Union home minister Amit Shah of the Government of India. It was announced on 29 October 2025. The museum is going to be built for the preservation of the ancient manuscripts and texts found in the region of the state of Bihar in India. The union home minister announced a budget of Rs 500 crore for the construction of the cultural museum in the city of Darbhanga. According to the union home minister the museum will serve as the centre for preservation of the cultural legacy of Mithila for future generations. It will promote the rich cultural heritage of the Mithila region in Indian subcontinent, across the world.

== Background ==
The region of Mithila in the Indian subcontinent was a renowned centre for learning Sanskrit and Vedic studies in the ancient and mediaeval period. Mithila is considered as a major centre for learning Indian philosophy. It was famous for the study of Nyaya Shastra (Science of Logic). Mithila has been the land of scholars since ancient period. The eminent Indian philosopher Adi Shankaracharya had also arrived in the Mithila region to debate with the other eminent scholar Mandan Mishra. Similarly Ubhaya Bharati, the wife of Mandan Mishra was a prominent lady scholar in the region. The Maithili poet Vidyapati was a great scholar of literature, poetry, politics and philosophy. He wrote several texts related to these fields. The union home minister during his speech in the region announced to build a grand museum dedicated to preserve and promote the legacy of the cultural heritage in Mithila region at a cost of Rs 500 crores. He expressed his plan to develop Mithilanchal as a global knowledge centre in the upcoming days.

== Construction initiative ==
The initiative for the constitution of Mithila Cultural Museum has been started by the Lok Sabha MP Dr Gopal Ji Thakur of Darbhanga Lok Sabha constituency. The initiative was taken at the chamber of the cultural and tourism minister Gajendra Singh Shekhawat in New Delhi. The city of Darbhanga has been selected for the location of the construction of the museum. After the meeting with the cultural and tourism minister, Gopal Ji Thakur informed the media that the proposed museum would be constructed at cost of ₹ 500. He further informed that it is an ambitious project for the development of tourism in the Mithila region of Bihar in India.
