= Paag =

Headgear worn by Indian and Nepalese peoples

The Mithila Paag, a headgear worn by Maithil men, is a sign of cultural identity and pride in Mithila.

The Paag is a headdress in the Mithila region of India and Nepal worn by Maithil people. It is a symbol of honour and respect and a significant part of Maithil culture.

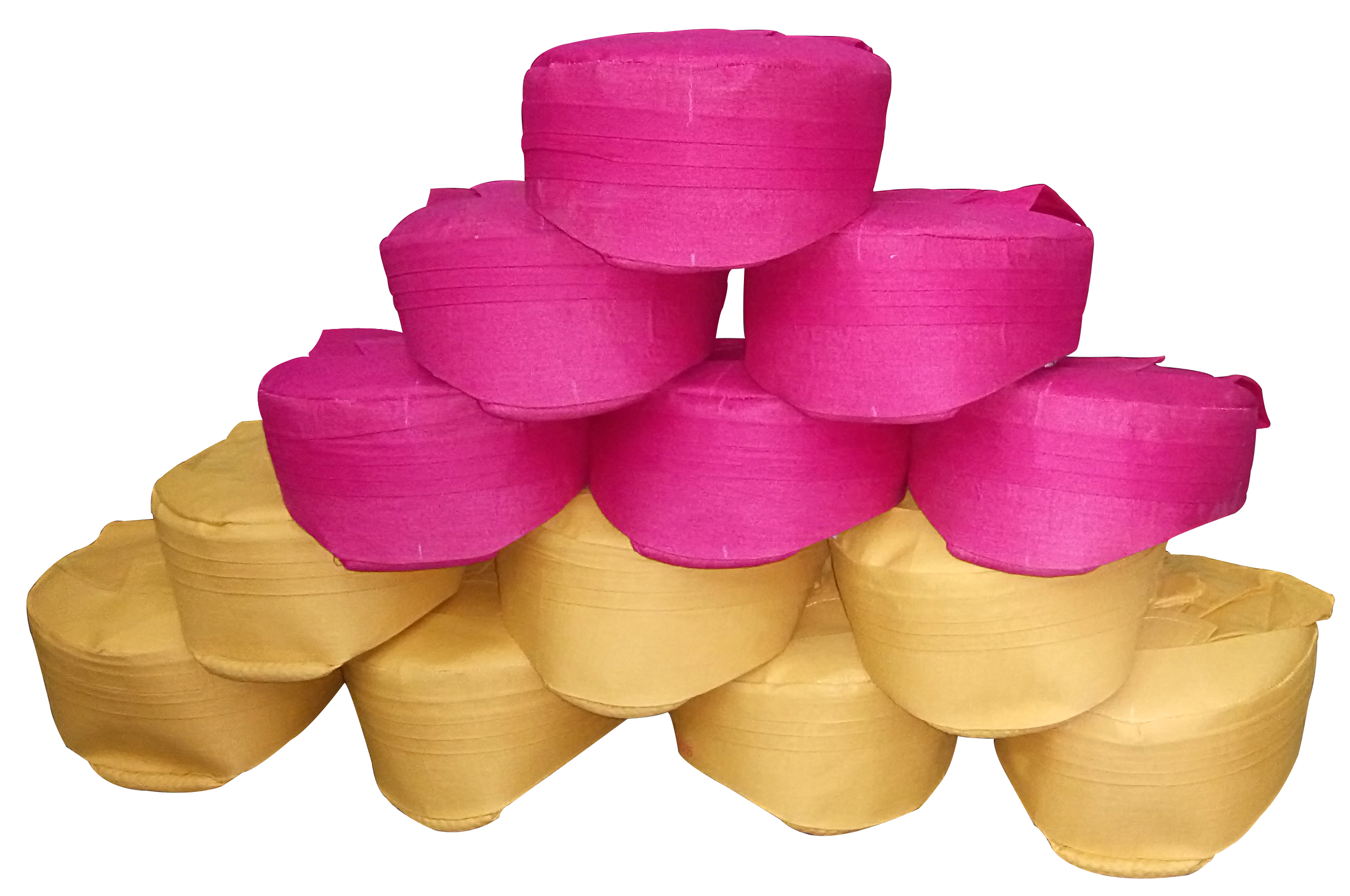
Different colour paags on display

== History and style ==
The Paag dates back to pre-historic times when it was made of plant leaves. It exists today in a modified form. The Paag is considered as a symbol of pride in Mithila. The colour of the Paag also carries a lot of significance. The red Paag is worn by the bridegroom and by those who are undergoing the sacred thread rituals. Paag of mustard colour is donned by those attending wedding ceremonies and the elders wear a white Paag.

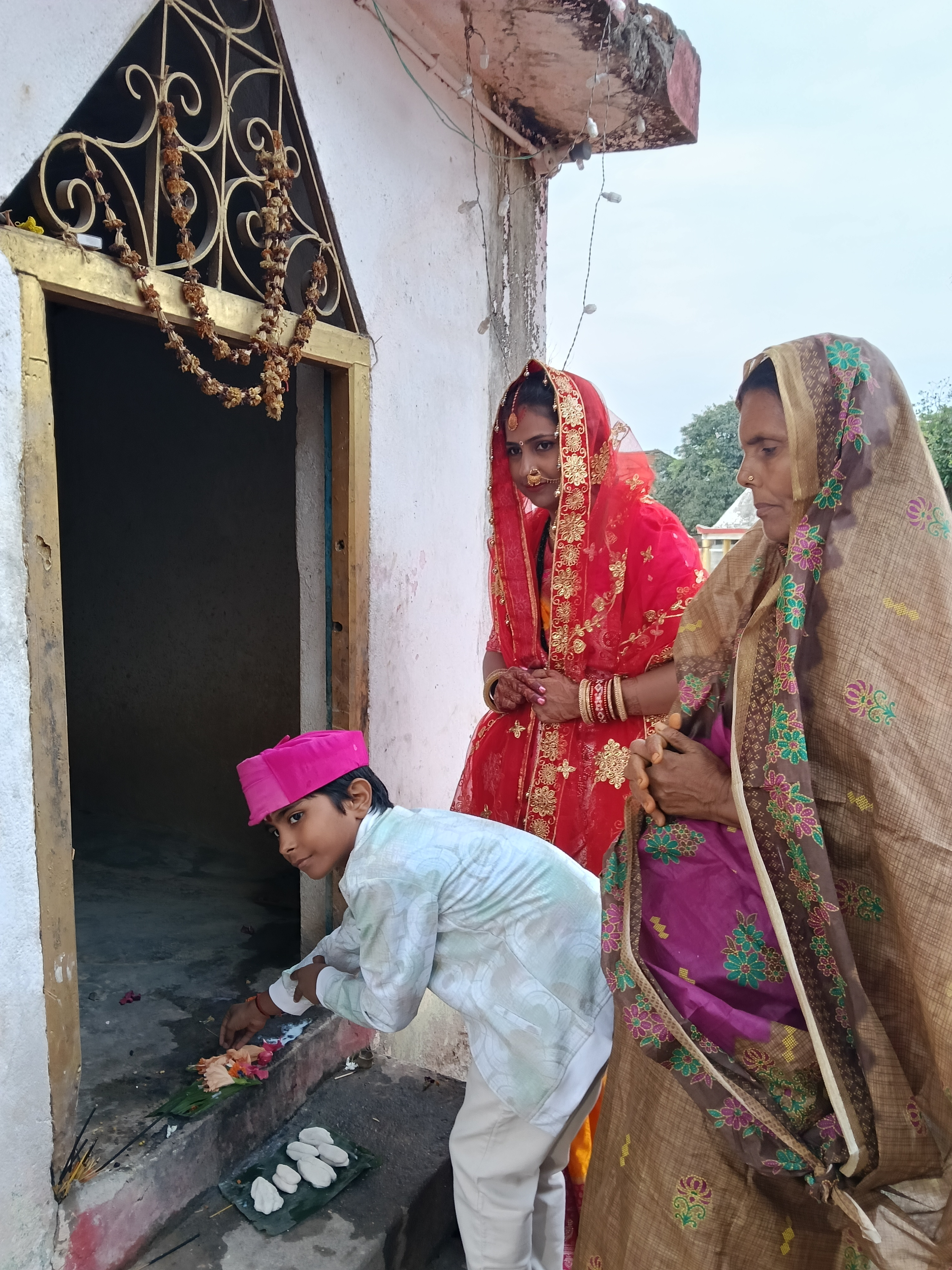
A Maithil baruaa with paag. Salutations to Lord Brahma Baba at Basuki Bihari during a Maithil Upanayan function.

== Campaign ==
A campaign to promote use of the paag was begun in 2016 by Mithilalok, a Mithila cultural pressure group set up in that year. Called Paag Bachau Abhiyan (Save the Paag Campaign), Mithilalok was associated with a proposed symbolic wearing of the garment by some representatives in the Bihar Legislative Council in August 2016, and also with a move to have it recognised as an official head-dress of the state of Bihar.

Darbhanga MP Gopal Jee Thakur had started and popularised the tradition of honouring people with Mithila Paag in the Indian Politics.

Paags designed and developed by Mithilalok are of different shades, colours and shapes considering fitting and suitability.

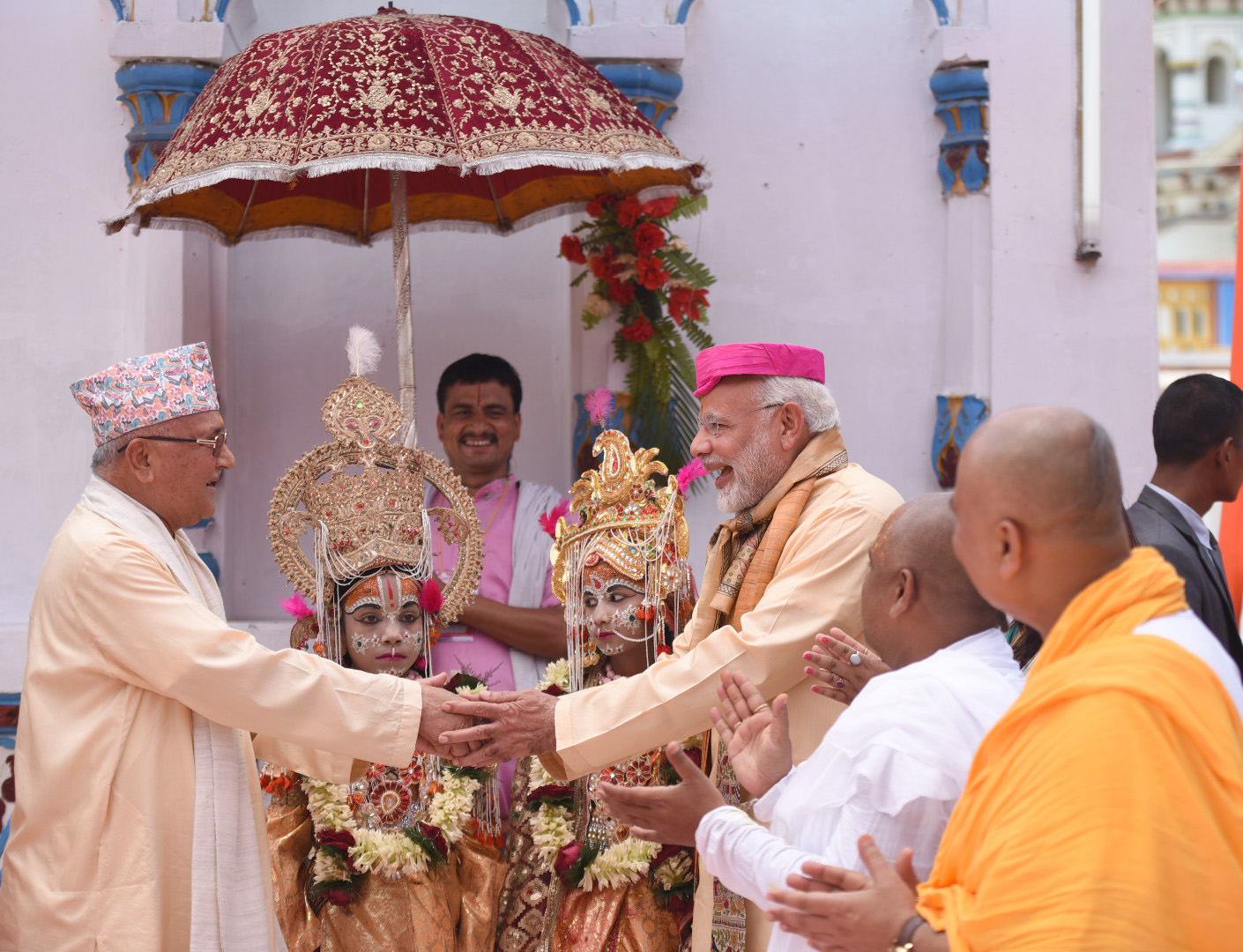
Indian Prime Minister Narendra Modi, wearing a paag, shaking hands with the Nepalese Prime Minister KP Sharma Oli, wearing a Dhaka topi, in Janakpurdham, Nepal

In order to demonstrate and send across the message of the Culture of Mithila and India, Paag March is held by Mithilalok wherein a large number of people take to streets wearing traditional Paag on their heads.

== Depiction on a postage stamp ==
On 10 February 2017, India Posts released a set of sixteen commemorative postage stamps on "Headgears of India". The Mithila Paag was featured on one of those postage stamps.
