= Jatara Parva =

Traditional festival in Mithila

Jatara Parva जतरा पर्व
- Nickname: Jatara
- Genre: Festival in Mithila
- Date: Dashami tithi
- Frequency: annually
- Location: Mithila region
- Countries: India and Nepal
- Participants: Huge number of devotees
- Major events: Yatra, Visarjan
- Patrons: Maithils
- Organiser: Durga Puja Samiti
- Sponsors: Hindu adherents

Jatara Parva (Maithili: जतरा पर्व), also written as Jatra Parva or Yatra Parba, is traditionally celebrated on the day of Vijayadashami (Dussehra) in the Mithila region of the Indian subcontinent. It is held on the tenth day of the month of Ashwin according to Hindu calendar.

== Description ==
The Mithila region in the subcontinent is famous for Shakti Upasana (worship). There is a tradition of worshiping Bhagwati Durga as Shaktiswarupa with utmost devotion in the region. On this day a yatra of Durga is organised. According to the religious belief in Hinduism, Dashmi is considered the most sacred day of the year because of the sacred Durga Yatra. It is believed that all ten gates of heaven open on this day. So this day is considered auspicious for the people of Mithila to start new ventures, get married or embark on a journey in any direction.

In the region, devotees worship clay statues of the Goddess Durga in pandals during the Durga Puja festival. On the occasion of the Jatara Parva, a huge processions of the devotees along with the statues of the deities in the pandals is circumambulated throughout the city or the village. After that the goddess is then bid farewell by immersing her clay idols or statues in rivers and ponds, commemorating her return to the abode of Lord Shiva.

== Legend ==
According to legend in Mithila region, it is believed that Goddess Durga comes to naihar (maternal home) for nine days during the Navaratri festival and leaves on Dashmi day and goes to her in-laws' house. After that she travels back to her consort Lord Shiva.

On this day, Maithils consider it auspicious to see the Neelkanth bird. It is believed that Lord Rama saw this bird while going to defeat Ravana. Therefore, on this day devotees go to the trees where these birds are found sitting and come to get a glimpse of this bird.
