= Madhushravani =

Festival for newly married brides in Mithila region

Madhushravani Puja मधुश्रावणी पूजा
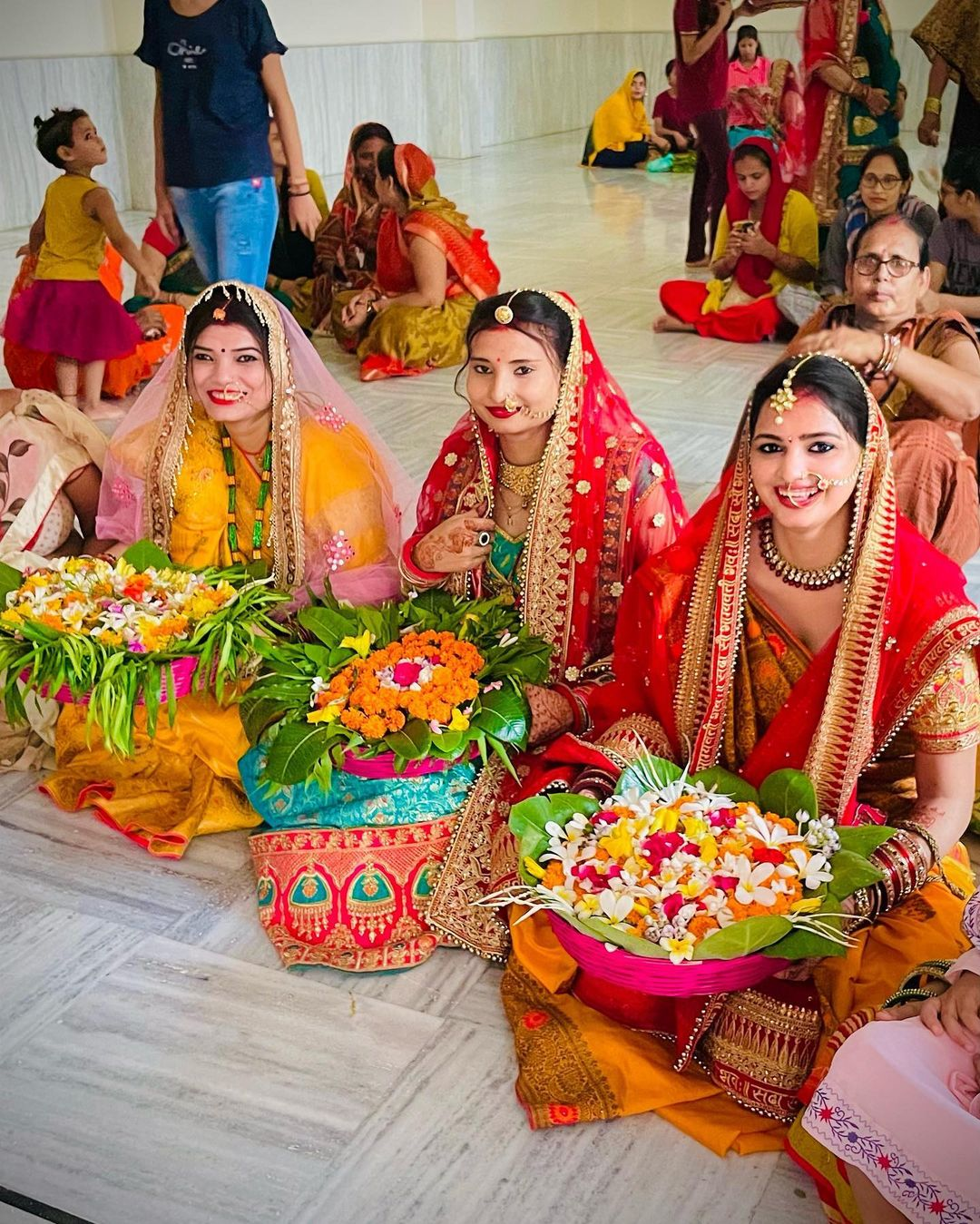
- Women Celebrating Madhushravani in Mithilanchal
- Nickname: Madhushravani
- Genre: Religious
- Frequency: Annually
- Location: Mithila region
- Country: India and Nepal
- Participants: Newly married brides in Mithila

Madhushravani (Maithili: मधुश्रावणी) is a multi-day Hindu festival celebrated in the Mithila region by newly married Maithil women, particularly Maithil Brahmins. It is believed that Goddess Parvati observed the Madhushravani Puja's fast first and continued to have Lord Shiva as her husband in all her births. According to legend, this festival is like a penance. It is an ancient festival practised in the region by the newly married Maithil women.

The 15-day festival lasts from the Panchami of the Krishna Paksha until Tritiya of the Shukla Paksha of the month of Savan.

== Etymology ==
The word Madhushravani is derived from the combination of the two Indic terms Madhu and Shravan.

== Observances ==
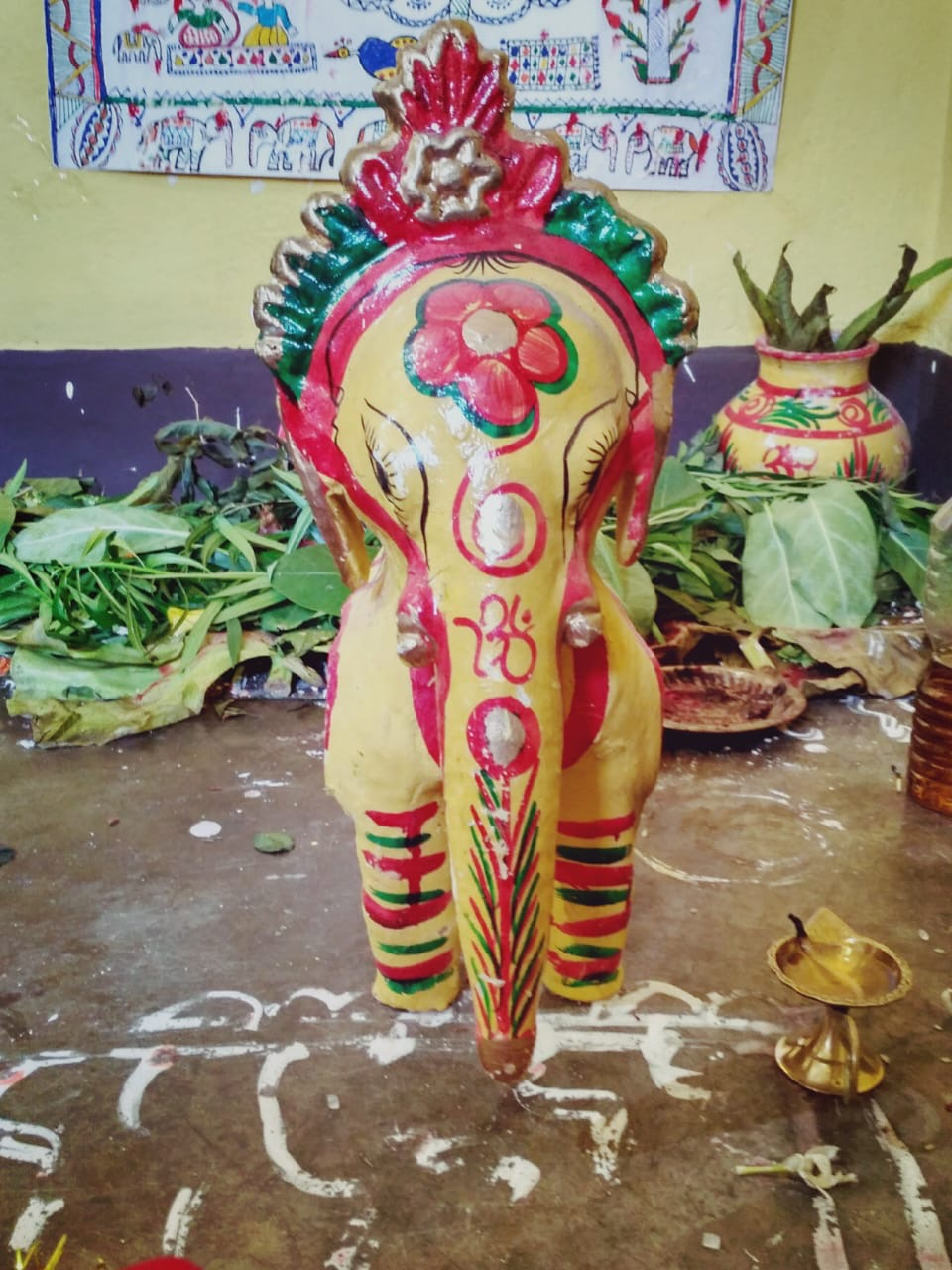
An elephant idol used in the Puja of Madhushravani.

It is customary for brides to wear clothes and jewelry given by their in-laws. All the materials of the Madhushravani Puja arrive from in-laws one day before the Puja starts. Participants pluck flowers and worship idols of Bishari Mata, Nag Nagin, Kechua, Elephant, and Mother Gauri with various kinds of fruits, flowers, and sweets. and then listen to the story of Shiva Vivah. During the puja, the story is told in 14 sections, including Maina Panchami, Mangala Gauri, Prithvi Janma, Mahadev Katha, Gauri Tapasya, Shiva Vivah, Ganga Katha, Bihula Katha, and Bal Vasant Katha. Rural women sing Madhushravani songs. The streets resonate with melodious Maithili folk songs. On the seventh, eighth and ninth days of the Puja, khir is offered as prasad. Each evening, women try to please Shiva by singing Aarti, Suhag Geet and Kohbar. The women eat arava food once a day. The women offer milk and lava to the Nag Devta in the morning and evening.

On the last day of the festival, the brides undergo a difficult test. The hands and feet of brides are cauterized with a cotton Temi by placing betel leaves on it and burning the Temi.

== Gallery ==
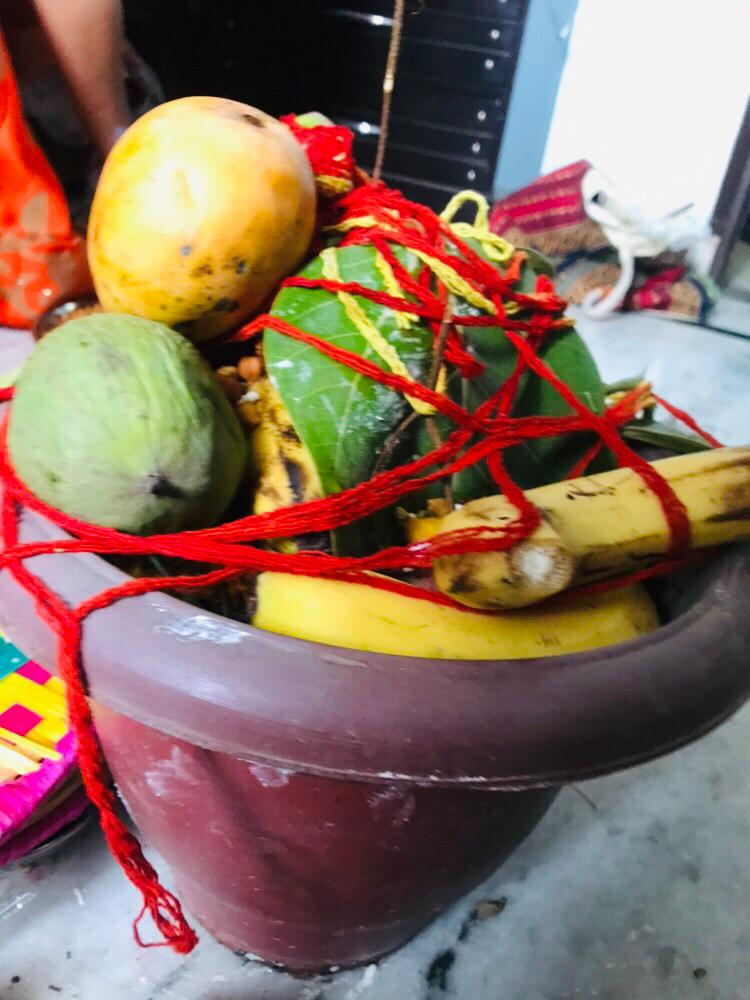
Fruits offered in Madhushravani Puja.

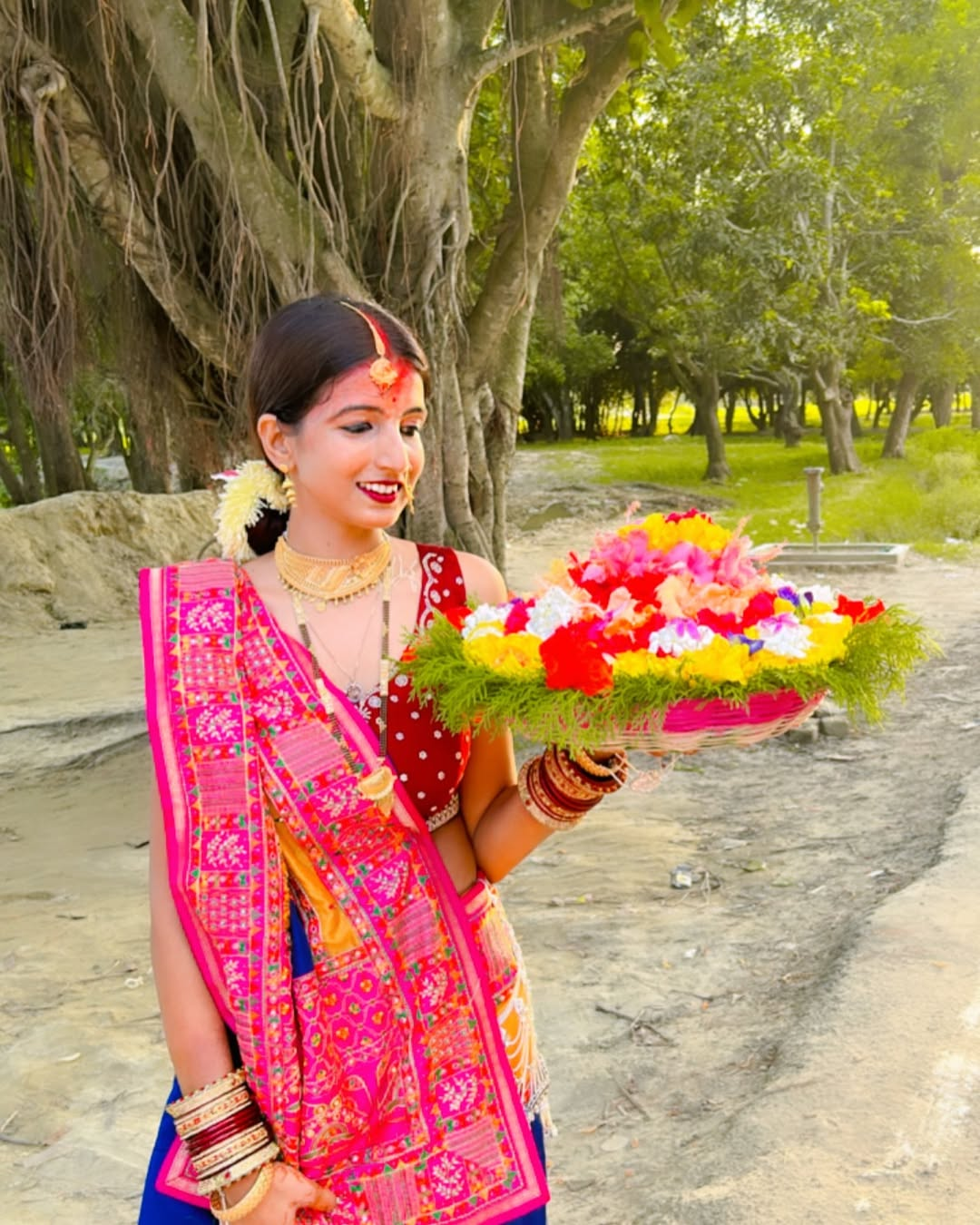
Maithili women doing Madhushravani

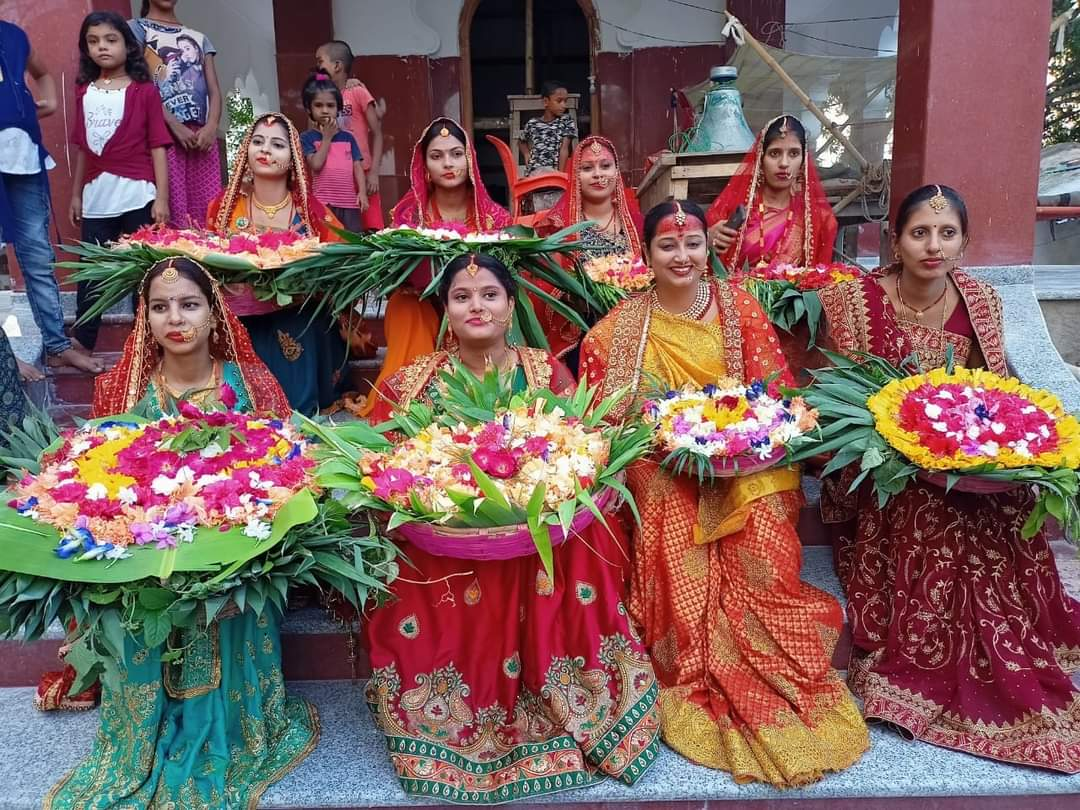
Madhushravani Festival of Mithila

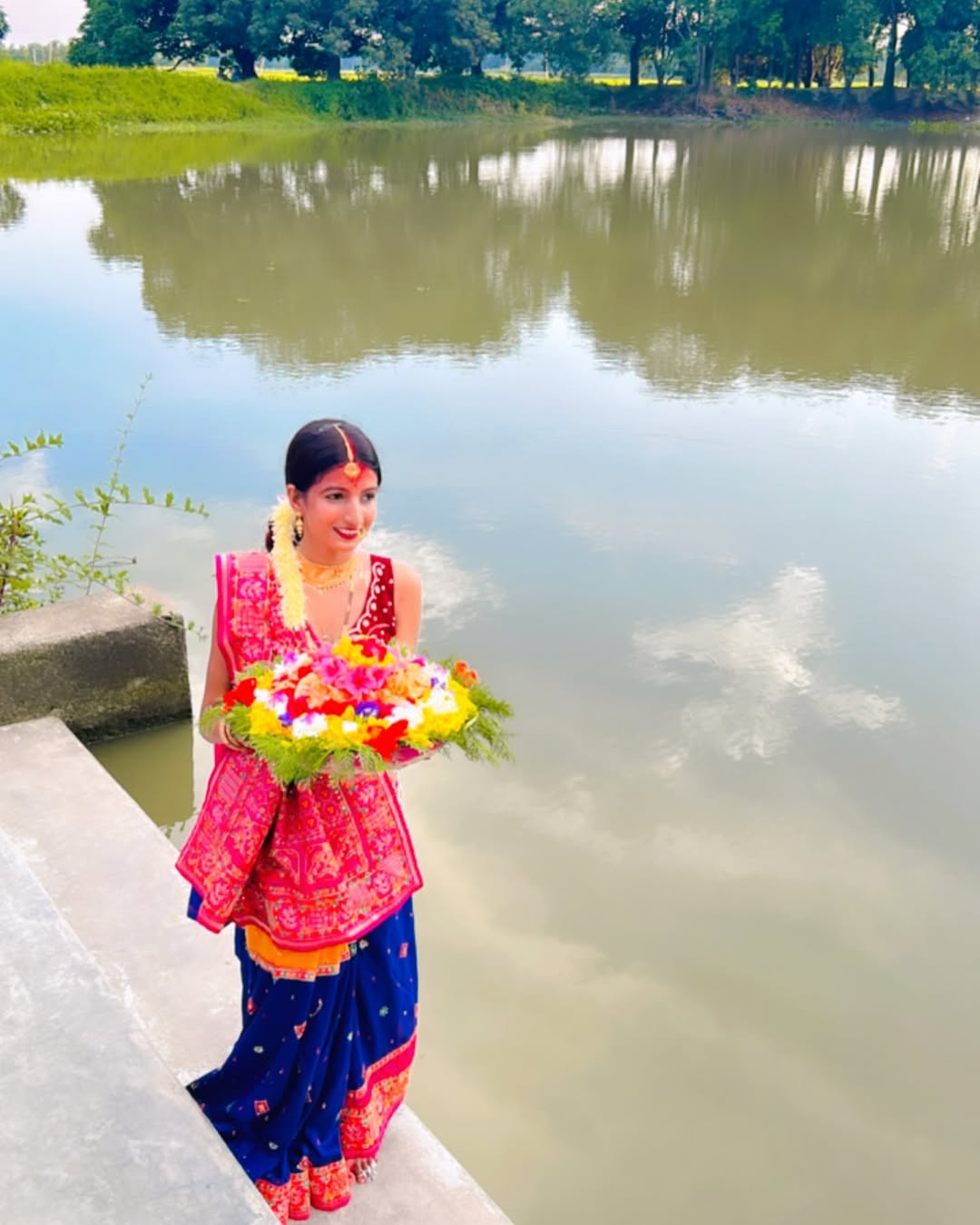
Maithili Women

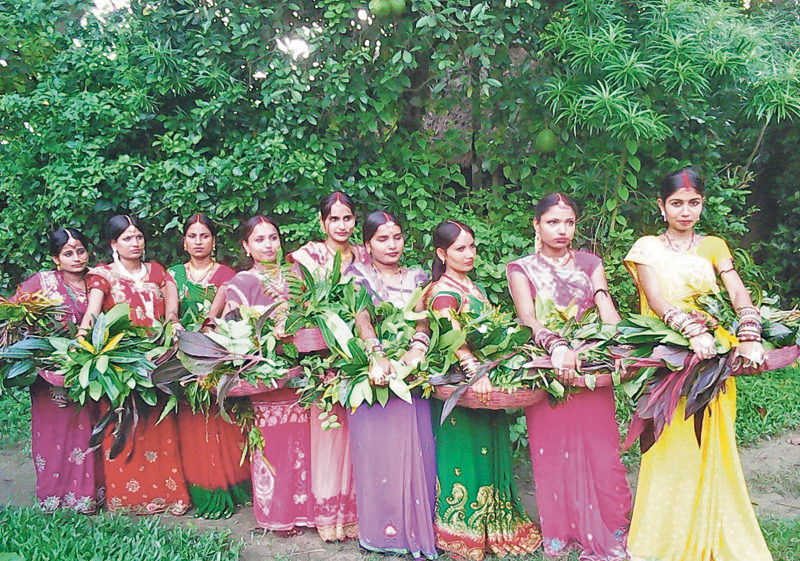
Madhushravani celebrated
