= Lavan Paavain =

New grains harvesting festival in Mithila

Lavan Paavain लवाण पावैन
- Nickname: Nawann Parva
- Genre: New grains harvesting festival in Mithila
- Frequency: annually
- Venue: Home of Maithils
- Location: Mithila region
- Countries: India and Nepal

Lavan Paavain (Maithili: लवाण पावैन) also called Nawann Parva is a special festival of the Mithila region in the Indian subcontinent that celebrates the harvest of new grains in the region. It is a nature praying festival and symbolises Grihasth tradition in the region. On this festival, chuda prepared from the rice obtained from the new paddy crop is offered as naivedya to deities in Hinduism Vishnu, Varuna and Agni. After the rituals and worship, everyone wishes for happiness and prosperity. Then, the members of the family eat dishes having chuda, curd, jaggery and pickle along with radish as prasad.

== Description ==
The festival is celebrated in the Hindu month of Agahan (usually December). The preparations for this festival begins more than a month in advance. On the day of the Ashwin Sankranti also known as Gabha Sankranti, the preparations for the festival begin by making 14 chipdi (cakes of dung). The chipdi are made by the unmarried girl of the house and kept in sunlight for drying. On the day of Navann Parva, these chipdi are used to light sacred ritualistic fire in front of the family deity called Kuldevi or Kuldevta.

Early in the morning on the day of Navann Parva, a male member of the family goes to his farm and harvests some paddy. The paddy harvested from the farm field are kept in front of the Kuldevi or Kuldevta of the family. Then the women of the family prepare chuda from that paddy. After that sacred prasad is prepared from the chuda by mixing raw milk and jaggery, which all the members of the family offer to Lord Agni.
