= Raib Parva =

Weekly festival in Mithila

Raib Parva रैब पर्व
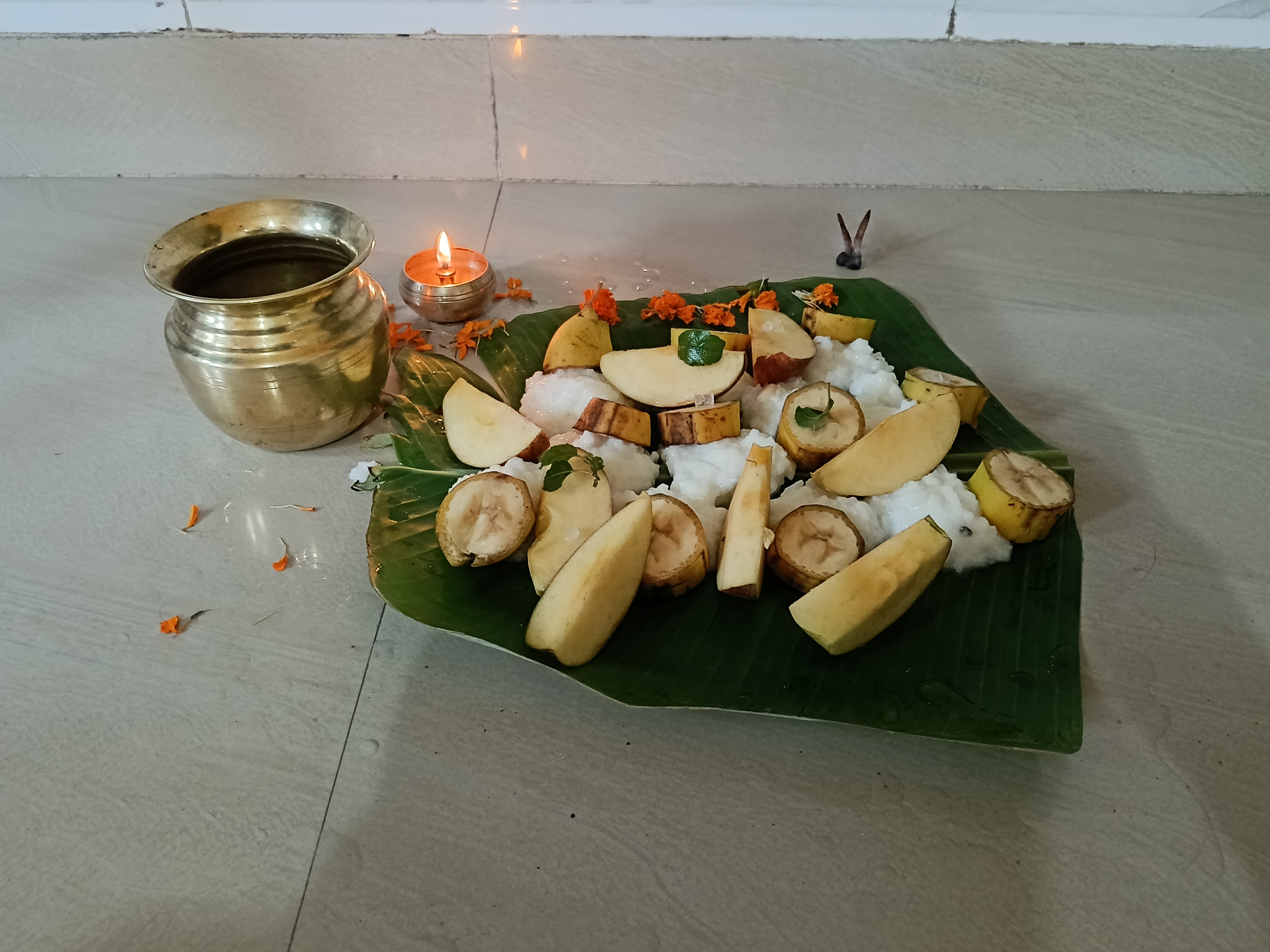
- Offerings (prasad) to Lord Suryanarayana on the occasion of the Raib Paavain Puja by Maithil women.
- Nickname: Raib Paavain
- Genre: Hindu festival dedicated to Lord Suryanarayana
- Date: Sunday
- Frequency: weekly
- Countries: India and Nepal
- Major events: Ravi Vrata Katha, fasting, sacred bathing in ponds and offerings Arghya, etc.
- Patrons: Maithils

Raib Parva (Maithili: रैब पर्व) or Raib Paavain or Ravi Vrata is a weekly festival dedicated to Lord Suryanarayana in the Mithila region of the Indian subcontinent. It is specially observed by Maithil women in the region. During the puja, the Maithil women wish and pray for the health, happiness, and prosperity of their sons, husbands, and family members. On this day, the women observe fasts and offer Arghya along with puja paraphernalia to the Sun God. It is also celebrated by the Tharu community in the region.

== Etymology ==
The etymology of the term Raib is derived from the Sanskrit word Ravi which is an alternate name of Lord Suryanarayana in Hinduism. The festival is celebrated on Sunday. The Indic term for Sunday is Ravivaar and in the Mithila region it is called as Raib. The other Indic term Parva or Paavain means festival or celebration. Thus, the literal meaning of Raib Parva or Paavain is the festival or worship of Lord Suryanarayana on the Sunday.

== Description ==
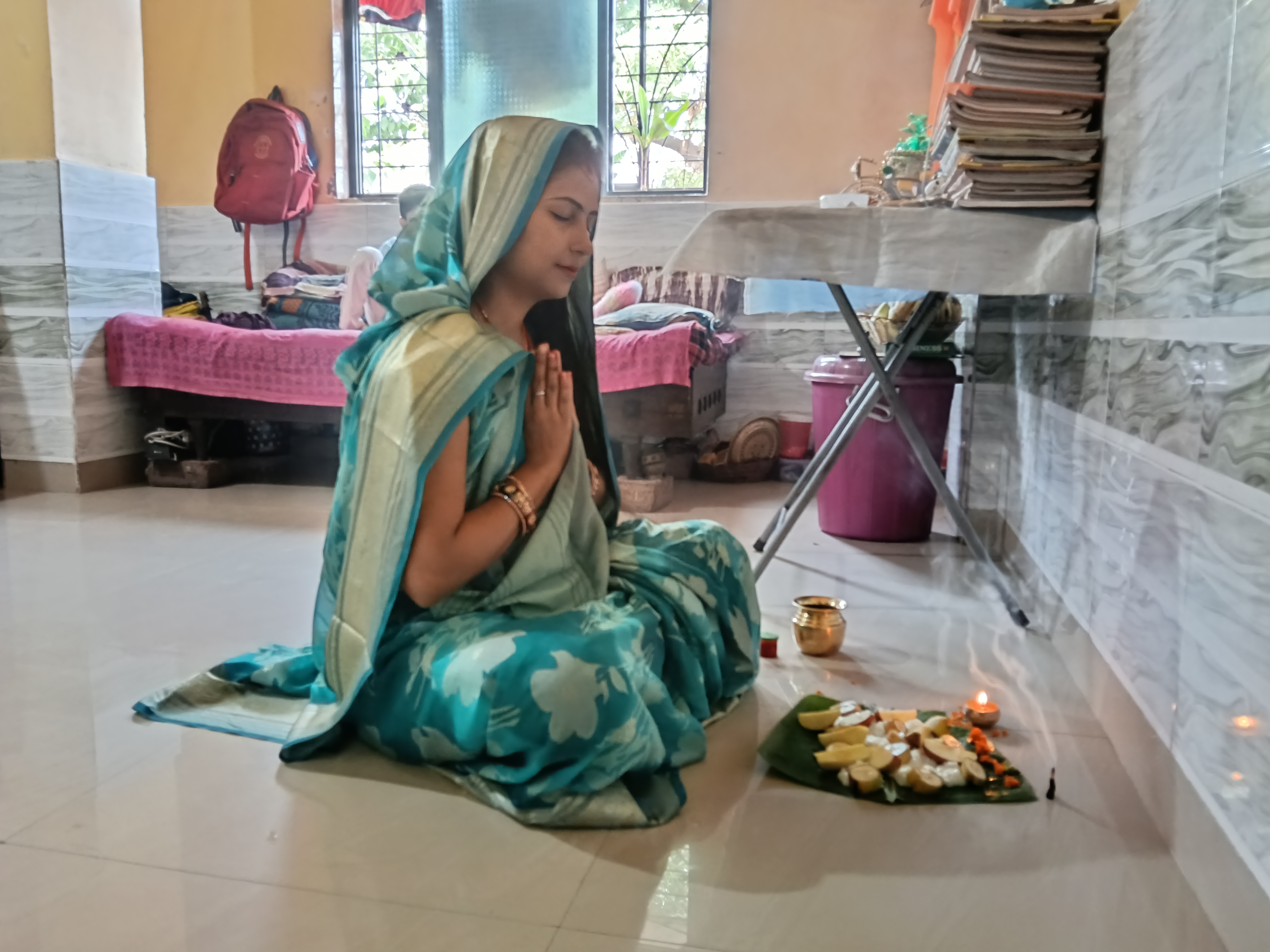
View of a Maithil woman performing Raib Puja in Mumbai.

The festival of Raib Paavain also called Ravi Vrata is a traditional fast often observed by the women of the Maithil community in the subcontinent. Some male of the society also observe the fasting. The devotee performing the fast of the Raib Paavain is called as Vrati. In the month of Bhadrapada (Bhadau), it is also called Bhadaiya Raib Parva.

This festival has a cycle of six months. During this cycle, the vrati woman traditionally fasts on every Sunday for the six months, while some vrati fast only one Sunday a month. On the puja days, consuming salt is strictly prohibited, therefore, the vrati sacrifices salt every Sunday.

== Observances ==
In the morning, the devotee Vrati of the Raib Paavain cleans her worship house and courtyards. Several types of fruits such as bananas, corn, cucumbers, and apples, etc. are brought from market for offerings. The Vrati cooks several delicious items for prasad in a cleaned room at her house. The delicious items are thekua, kheer, roti, pua, puri and other prasad items.

Thekua and banana

Prasad for Raib Puja.

After cooking the delicious prasad items, the Vrati along with her companion and family members go to a sacred pond or river nearby her residence. She carries the prepared delicious prasad items and five types fruits, sweets along with flowers, supari and five paan leaves in a changera. In the sacred pond or the river, the Vrati takes a holy bath and offer Arghya of these items to Lord Suryanarayana.

After offering Arghya to Lord Suryanarayana at the pond or river, the vrati woman returns to home. Then, at home, the various fruits, sweets and the delicious cooked items of the prasad are decorated on a banana leaf inside the worship room for performing further worship to Lord Suryanarayana. During the rituals of the worship, the story of the Raib Vrata Katha is heard. At the end of the Vrata Katha, the delicious items along with various fruits and sweets decorated on the banana leaf are offered to the God as Naivedya, wishing good luck for children, husband and the family members. At last, the offered Naivedya to the God is distributed among the family members as prasad.
