= Bhanudatta Misra =

Indian sanskrit poet

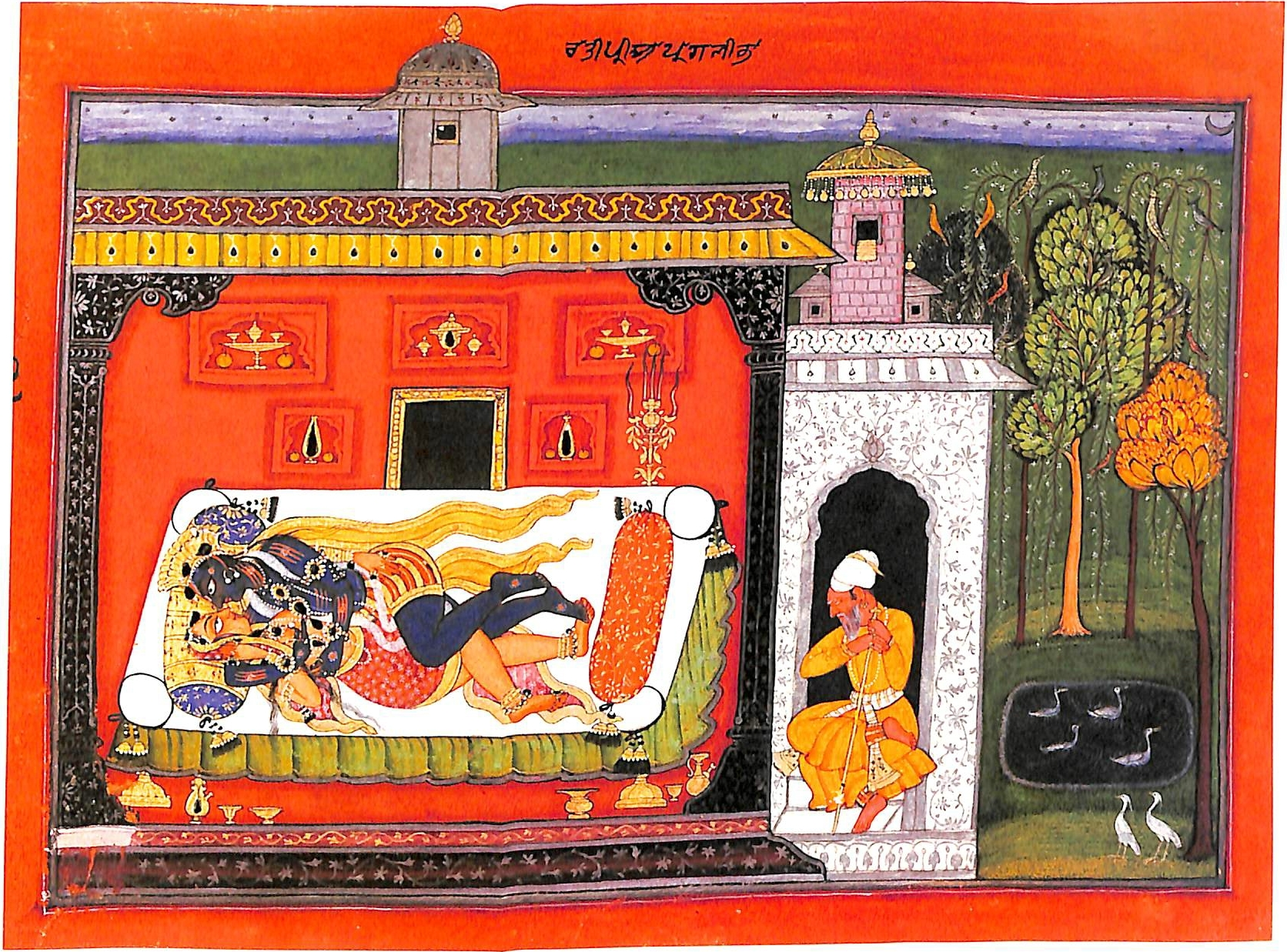
Unending Passion: The Ratipriya Heroine, Folio from the Rasamānjari series attributed to Kripal of Nurpur. Nurpur, c. 1660-1670. Dogra Art Museum

Bhanudatta Misra was a Sanskrit poet from the Mithila region of India who has been dated to some time in the late 15th and early 16th century.

Bhanudatta's works started to gain popularity, particularly in the early modern period when his compositions, the Rasamānjari and the Rasatarangini received numerous commentaries especially up till the 18th century. As per Sheldon Pollock; "no other Sanskrit poet exercised anything remotely approaching Bhanudatta's influence on the development of the Hindi literary tradition between 1600 and 1850.".

== Life ==
As per Bhanudatta himself, he was born in the country of Videha corresponding to the Mithila region of modern-day North Bihar in India and belonged to the Maithil Brahmin community. He also states that his father was a poet named Ganeshvara. Speaking of his background in the third person, he states:

His father was Ganéshvara,

brightest jewel in the crown of poetry, his land, Videha country,

where waves of the holy river ripple.

Other than this, Bhanudatta gives very little information about his life from his works which was typical of Sanskrit poets of the period. Many poets would also travel vast distances to secure royal patronage and many of Bhanudattas works were likely composed under the patronage of a Muslim rule in Devagiri in modern-day Maharashtra whom Bhanudatta refers to as a "King Nijama". Sheldon Pollock has connected this "Nijama" with Malik Ahmad Nizam Shah I of the Ahmadnagar Sultanate. The outcome of this was that Bhanudatta's works continued to be deeply studied in the Deccan region and in other neighbouring sultanates like that of Golconda.

== Influence ==
Bhanudatta's works made an impact on the emergent painting tradition of early modern India. The Bouquet of Rasa was well received within the field of miniature paintings and was illustrated possibly as early as the 1600s in the region of Mewar. His poems have also been depicted in miniature paintings from the Deccan, Chamba and Nurpur.

== Works ==
The attributed works of Bhanudatta Misra are:

- Alankaratilaka (Forehead Ornament of Figures)
- Gitagauripatikavya
- Kumarabhargaviyacampu
- Rasamānjari (Bouquet of Rasa)
- Rasatarangini (Rivers of Rasa)
