= Maithils =

Indo-Aryan ethno-linguistic group from the Indian subcontinent

मैथिल लोक
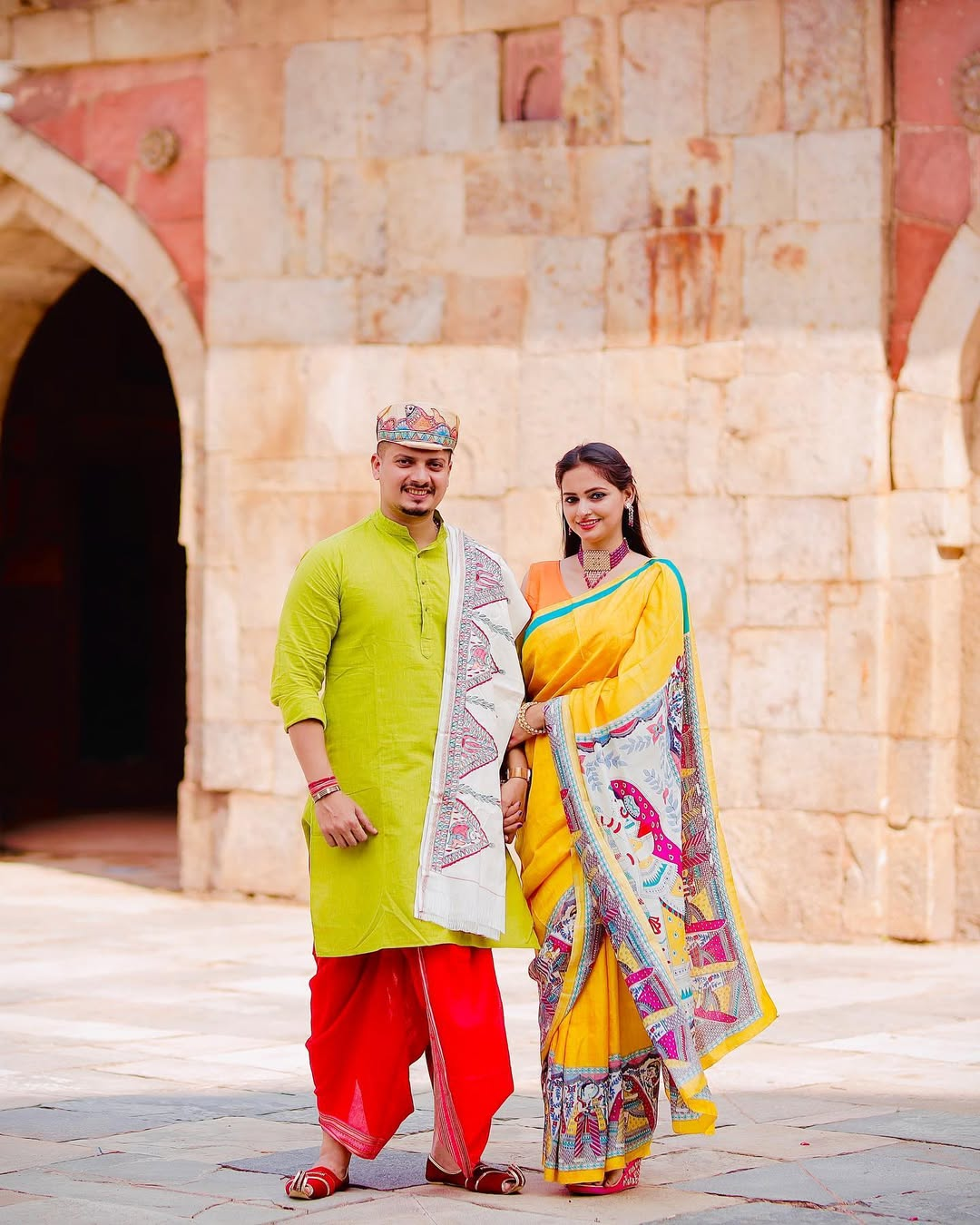
- A Maithili couple

Total population
- c. 75 million

Regions with significant populations
- Mithila region; India (North & Eastern Bihar, Northeastern Jharkhand) and Nepal (Central & Eastern Madhesh, Southern Koshi, Southern Bagmati); Tirhut Sarkar
- India: 70,215,711
- Nepal: 3,222,389

Languages
- Maithili

Religion
- Majority: Hinduism; Minority: Islam · Buddhism · Others

Related ethnic groups
- Bengalis · Magadhis · Bhojpuris

- Person: Maithil
- People: Maithils (Maithil lok)
- Language: Maithili
- Country: Mithila

The Maithils (Devanagari: मैथिल), also known as Maithili people, are an Indo-Aryan cultural and ethno-linguistic group from the Indian subcontinent, who speak the Maithili language as their native language. Since Mithila is also called Tirhut, they are also known as Tirhutiya. They inhabit the Mithila region, which comprises Northern and Eastern Bihar and Northeastern Jharkhand in India & in Nepal constituting Madhesh Province in addition to some Terai districts of Bagmati and Koshi Provinces.

The Mithila region forms an important part of Hinduism as it is said to be the birthplace of Sita, the wife of Ram and incarnation of Lakshmi.

== History ==
=== Vedic period ===
Mithila first gained prominence after being settled by Indo-Aryan speaking peoples who established the Videha kingdom. During the late Vedic period (c. 1100–500 BCE), Videha became one of the major political and cultural centers of South Asia, along with Kuru and Pañcāla. The kings of the Videha Kingdom were called Janakas.

The Videha Kingdom later became incorporated into the Vajjika League which was based in Vaishali. The Licchavis of Vaishali were one of the constituent tribes of the Vajjika league and the territory of the Licchavis formed a single territorial unit along with Videha and Mallakas. The Licchavis remained in Vaishali up to the Gupta period with the fourth century A.D. Gupta Emperor, Samudragupta, being the son of a Licchavi princess from Vaishali.

=== Medieval period ===
From the 11th century to the 20th century, Mithila was ruled by various indigenous dynasties. The first were the Karnatas of Mithila who ruled from 1097-1324 A.D. They were followed by the Oiniwar dynasty who ruled from 1325–1526 A.D.

During the Mughal-era, Mithila was controlled by a dynasty of zamindars called the Raj Darbhanga who were tributaries to the Mughals. It was during this period that the capital of Mithila was moved to Darbhanga.

=== Maithili-speaking dynasties and kingdoms ===
- Karnat dynasty, 1097 CE–1324 CE
- Oiniwar dynasty, 1325 CE–1526 CE
- Dronwara Dynasty, 14th–15th century CE
- Raj Darbhanga, 1557 CE −1947 CE
- Malla dynasty, 1201 CE-1779 CE
- Senas of Makwanpur, 1518 CE –1762 CE

== Region ==
=== India ===
Majority of Maithils normally reside north of the Ganges; based around Darbhanga and the rest of North Bihar. Native Maithili speakers also reside in Delhi, Kolkata, Patna, Ranchi and Mumbai.

Indian Mithila comprises Tirhut, Munger, Bhagalpur, Darbhanga, Kosi, and Purnia divisions of Bihar and Santhal Pargana division of Jharkhand.

- Darbhanga in particular played an important role in the history of Mithila and is considered one of its "core centers". It was the center of Raj Darbhanga who ruled most of the region.
- Madhubani also where Mithila painting originated from which is a major part of Maithili culture.
- Sitamarhi is claimed by many to be the birthplace of Goddess Sita with Sita Kund being a major pilgrimage site.
- Balirajgarh, situated in present-day Madhubani district in Bihar is thought to be the capital of ancient Mithila Kingdom.
- Maithils played a major role in building the Baidyanath Temple which is an important pilgrimage site for them.

=== Nepal ===
The adjoining districts of the eastern Terai form Nepalese Mithila. This area was part of the kingdom of Videha. The kingdom appears in the Ramayana. Many people claim Janakpur to be the birthplace of Goddess Sita.

There was a movement in the Madhesh region which is predominantly a Maithili community of Nepal for a separate province. Province No. 2 was established under the 2015 Constitution, which transformed Nepal into a Federal Democratic Republic, with a total of 7 provinces. Province No. 2 (now Madhesh Province) has a Maithili speaking majority and consists of most of the Maithili speaking areas of Nepal. It has been demanded by some Mithila activists that Province No. 2 be named 'Mithila Province'. Province no. 2 was given the name Madhesh Province on 17 January 2022.

== Language ==
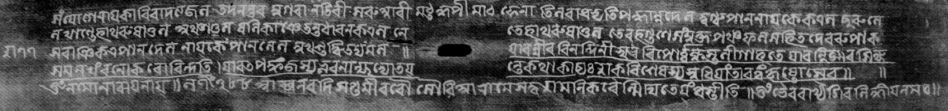
Manuscript of the Varna Ratnakara, the earliest prose work in the Maithili language and dated to the early 14th century

The common language of the Maithil people is Maithili, which is one of the recognised regional languages of India listed in the Eighth Schedule of the Indian Constitution and the second national language of Nepal in the Interim Constitution of Nepal. The Tirhuta script, also known as the Mithilakshar script. However, during the 20th century most Maithili writers gradually adopted Devanagari script for Maithili. Although Tirhuta is still sometimes used by religious pundits for writing ceremonial letters and documents, and efforts are underway to broaden the scope of its usage.

== Culture ==
Men and women in Mithila are very religious and dress for festivals as well. The costumes of Mithila stem from the rich traditional culture of Mithila. Kurta and Dhoti with a Mithila Painting bordered Maroon coloured Gamchha which is the Symbol of Passion, Love, Bravery and Courage are common clothing items for men. Men wear a Gold ring on their nose which symbolizes prosperity, happiness and wealth inspired by Lord Vishnu. Also, wear a Balla on their wrist and Mithila Paag on their Head. In ancient times there was no colour option in Mithila, so the Maithil women wore white or yellow Saree with a red Border but now they have a lot of variety and colour options and wear Laal-Paara (the traditional red-boarded white or yellow Saree) on some special occasions, and also wear Shakha-Pola with a lanthi in their hand which is Mandatory to wear after marriage in Mithila. In Mithila culture, this represents new beginnings, passion and prosperity. Red also represents the Hindu goddess Durga, a symbol of new beginnings and feminine power. During Chhaith, the women of Mithila wear pure cotton dhoti without stitching which reflects the pure, traditional Culture of Mithila. Usually crafted from pure cotton for daily use and from pure silk for more glamorous occasions, traditional attire for the women of Mithila includes Jamdani, Banarisi, Bhagalpuri and many more. Many festivals are celebrated throughout the year in Mithila. Chhath Puja, Durga Puja and Kali puja is celebrated as perhaps the most important of all the celebrations of Mithila. Similarly, Ashtajam Puja, Lakhram Puja and Chaurchan Puja, etc are some local celebrations and festivals followed by the Maithils community towards the devotion to God.

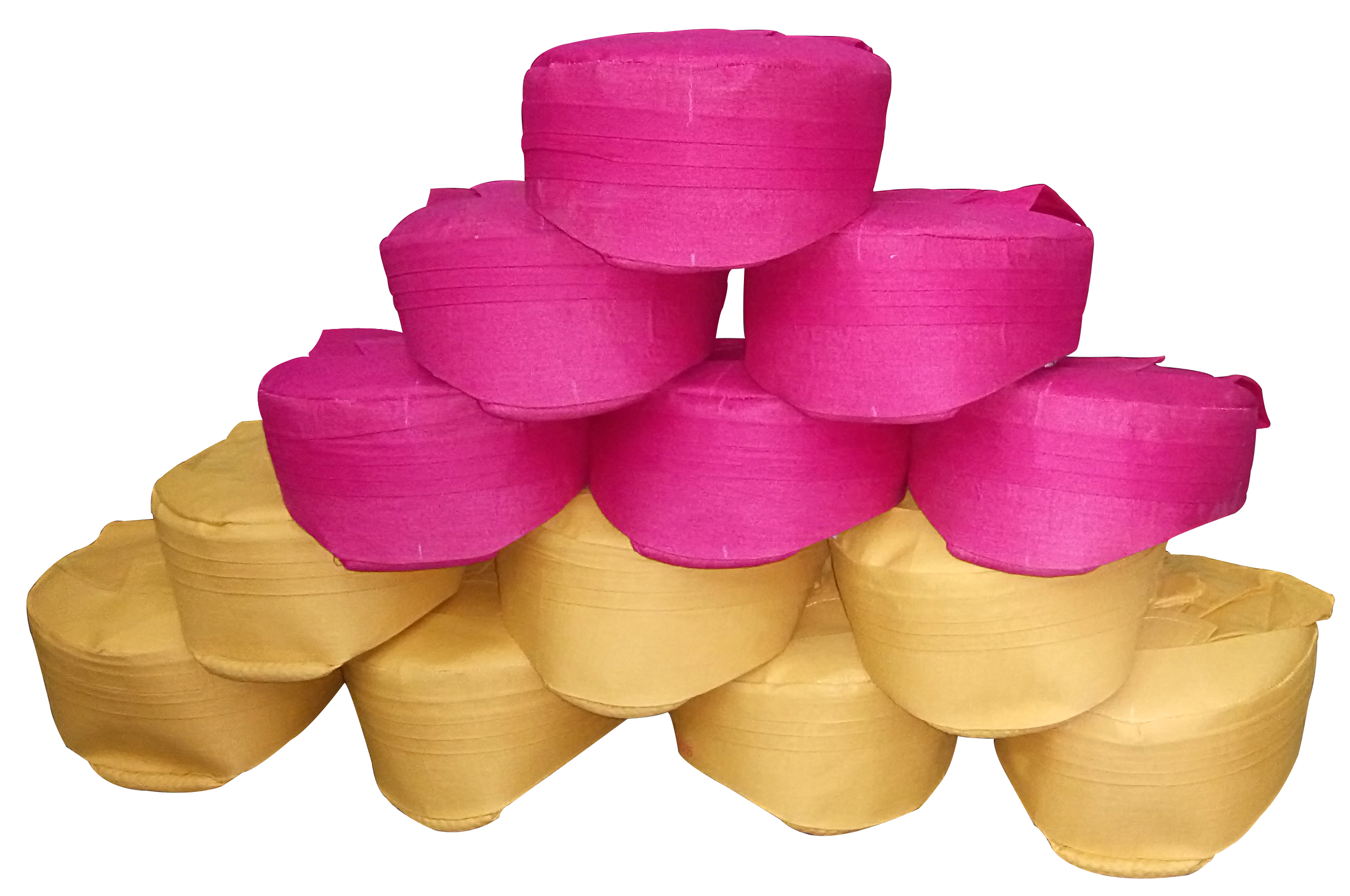
The Paag is the traditional headgear of the Maithil people

=== Household structure ===
Traditionally Maithils lived in Badaghars called longhouses with big families of many generations, sometimes 40–50 people. All household members pool their labour force, contribute their income, share the expenditure and use one kitchen. In the courtyard of a Maithil family, there is a Dalaan for relaxation and gathering of the family members, relatives and close neighbours of the society in village. It is also used for cultural activities of the family and the neighborhood.

=== Religion ===
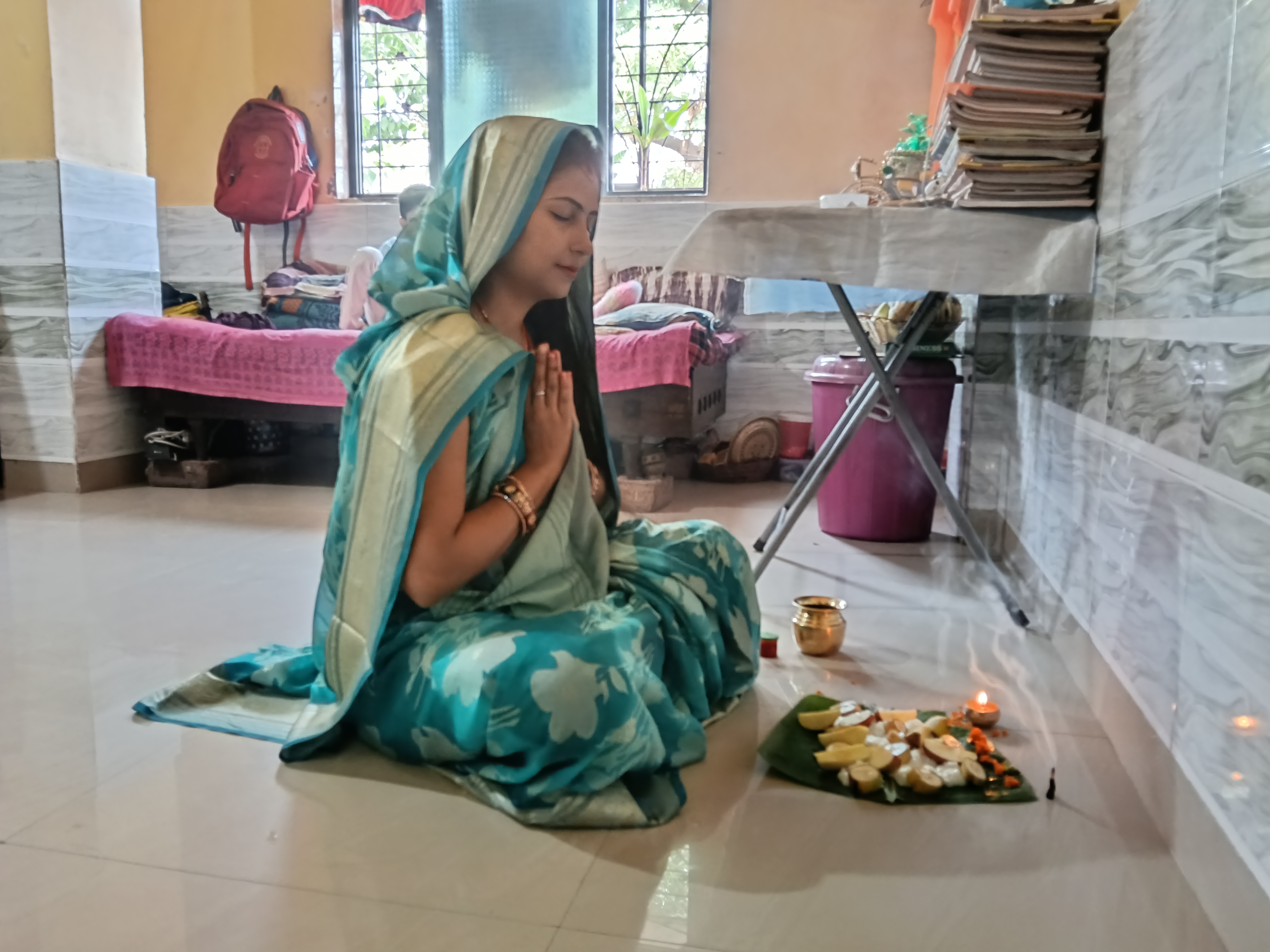
Maithil woman performing rituals of Mithila's traditional folk worship of Raib Paavain

The religious practices of the Maithils is based on orthodox Hinduism as Mithila has historically been a principal seat of Hindu learning. Apart from main stream Hinduism, there are some local traditions of worshiping Baraham Baba and Gosaun Devata by them. In every village of the Mithila region, there is at least one common worship place Brahma Sthan also known as Dihawar Sthan attached to an old pipal tree, where Brahma Baba is worshipped by the Maithils. Brahma Baba also called as Graama Devata is believed to be the protector God of the village. Maharani Sthan is the other common worship place, where Goddess Bhagawati is worshipped by the Maithils. Similarly at every courtyards of the houses of Maithils, there is Gosaunik Ghar where Kuldevata and Kuldevi of the family is worshipped. Dharmaraj Baba and Bhagwati are major Kuldevta and Kuldevi respectively in the tradition of Maithils community. For the Dushadh community, the King Salhesh is considered as the Kuldevta and similarly for the Guaar community (Yadav) of Maithils, he is Krishnaram considered to be the Lokadevata of that community.

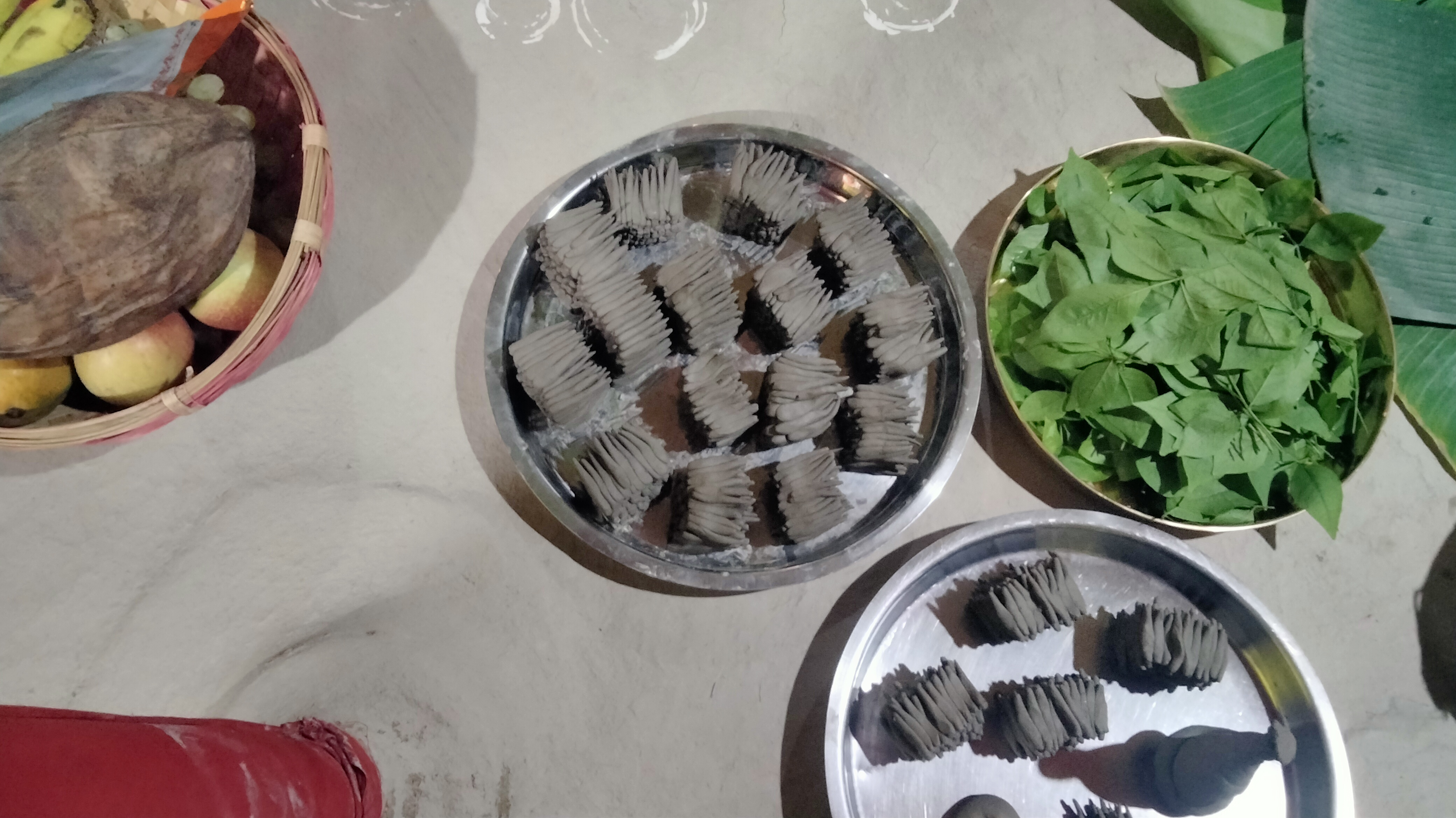
View of Parthiva Shivalingas made by Maithil Brahmin women at Basuki Bihari, Chaudhary Tol.

In the mainstream Hinduism, the tradition of Shaivism in Mithila is one of the oldest and continued tradition in the region. Similarly, Shaktism is other principal tradition in the culture of the Maithil community. In this tradition, Durga Puja is a major ceremonial festival in the region. It is practiced according to the Mithila tradition of Durga Puja in the region.

== Demands for administrative units ==
=== Proposed Indian state ===
Since the reorganization of states in India, many Maithils have advocated for a separate state of Mithila based on their distinct linguistic, cultural, and historical identity. The proposed state generally encompasses the Maithili-speaking regions of Bihar, and Jharkhand. Alongside the demand for statehood, Maithil organizations have campaigned for greater recognition and promotion of the Maithili language, including its use in administration, education, and public services.

The Mithila state movement has been supported by various social, cultural, and political organizations, which organize conferences, public meetings, and demonstrations to advance their demands. Advocates argue that a separate state would help preserve the region's linguistic heritage, promote balanced economic development, and strengthen the cultural traditions associated with Mithila.

== Politics ==
=== India ===
Maithils hold considerable political influence in India. They dominate the polity of Bihar, the country's third-most populous state, forming a majority in 144 of the 243 constituencies of the Bihar Legislative Assembly.

=== Nepal ===
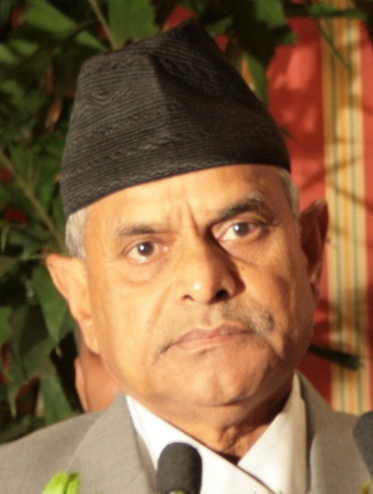
Ram Baran Yadav, former first president of Nepal (2008–2015)

Maithils are the largest ethnolinguistic group in the Madhesh Province, and the second largest ethnolinguistic group in Koshi Province. Following the abolition of the Kingdom of Nepal and the end of Nepal's status as the world's last Hindu Kingdom in 2008, Ram Baran Yadav became the first President of Nepal. He belonged to the Maithil community and hailed from Dhanusha District of Madhesh province.

Following the 2026 general election, a new government was formed, with Balendra Shah becoming the first Madheshi to serve as Prime Minister of Nepal. He previously served as the first independent Mayor of Kathmandu from 2022 to 2025. Although he belongs to Maithil community, he was born and raised in Kathmandu.

== Notable people ==
The following is a list of notable individuals, both past and present, from the Mithila region:

=== Historical ===
- Janaka, King of Mithila and Father in Law of King Rama.
- Sita, Princess of Mithila Kingdom and wife of King Rama.
- Udayana, 10th/11th-century philosopher and logician of the Nyaya school.
- Vidyapati, 14th/15th century Maithili and Sanskrit poet-saint.
- Bhanudatta Misra, 15th/16th-century Sanskrit poet from Mithila.
- Harisimhadeva, King of Mithila during the Karnat dynasty from 1304 - 1324 CE.
- Gangadeva, King of Mithila during the Karnat dynasty from 1147-1187 CE.
- Narsimhadeva, King of Mithila during the Karnat dynasty from 1174-1227 CE.
- Ramasimhadeva, King of Mithila during the Karnat dynasty from 1227-1285 CE.
- Jyotirishwar Thakur, 14th-century poet, playwright and musician who composed the earliest prose work in the Maithili language, the Varna Ratnakara.
- Caṇḍeśvara Ṭhakkura, political theorist and general from the 14th century.
- Gaṅgeśa, 13th/14th century philosopher, logician and mathematician .
- Pakshadhara Mishra, 15th-century philosopher.
- Vāchaspati Misra, 9th/10th-century philosopher of the Advaita Vedanta tradition.
- Lakshmeshwar Singh, zamindar and principal landowner of Raj Darbhanga, 1860–1898.
- Rameshwar Singh, zamindar and principal landowner of Raj Darbhanga, 1898–1929.
- Śāriputra, 15th-century Indian Buddhist monk and the last abbot of the Mahabodhi Temple in Bodh Gaya. Born in Simraungadh in modern-day East Champaran district.

=== Modern ===
- Balendra Shah, Prime Minister of Nepal
- Maghfoor Ahmad Ajazi, Indian Freedom fighter, political activist, social worker, poet and writer, born in Muzaffarpur
- Bimalendra Nidhi, Member of Nepalese parliament, Vice president of ruling party Nepali Congress and former Deputy Prime Minister of Nepal.
- Ramdhari Singh 'Dinkar' was an Indian Hindi poet, essayist, patriot and academic.
- Bindheshwari Prasad Mandal was an Indian parliamentarian and social reformer who served as the chairman of the Second Backward Classes Commission (popularly known as the Mandal Commission).
- C. K. Raut, formerly US-based computer scientist, author and political leader of Nepal.
- Syed Shahnawaz Hussain, Indian politician, born in Supaul
- Bhagwat Jha Azad was the Chief Minister of Bihar and a member of Lok Sabha.
- Ram Baran Yadav, First president of Nepal
- Tarkishore Prasad, Deputy Chief Minister of Bihar, born in Saharsa district
- Nagarjun, Renowned Maithili Poet
- Phanishwar Nath 'Renu', A prominent post-Premchand Hindi writer who deeply infused Maithili culture and ethos into his works.
- Acharya Ramlochan Saran, Hindi littérateur, grammarian and publisher
- Vaibhav Sooryavanshi, a young Indian cricketer who plays for Bihar in domestic cricket and Rajasthan Royals in the Indian Premier League
- Anukul Roy, Indian cricketer who plays for Kolkata Knight Riders in the Indian Premier League
- Udit Narayan, Bollywood playback singer
- Sharda Sinha, Indian folk singer
- Maithili Thakur, Indian singer and politician

== See also ==
- History of Mithila Region
- Culture of Mithila Region
- Maithili language
- Mithila
- Maithil cuisine
- Mithila State Movement
- Chumavan
- Lavan Paavain
- Maithil Upanayan
- Mithila tradition of Durga Puja

== Bibliography ==
- Alan R. Beals & John Thayer Hitchcock (1960). "Field Guide to India". India: National Academies.
