= Vaishnava Padavali =

Movement in medieval Bengali literature from the 15th to 17th centuries

The Vaishnava Padaaboli (Bengali: বৈষ্ণব পদাবলী) movement refers to a period in medieval Bengali literature from the 15th to 17th centuries, marked by an efflorescence of Vaishnava poetry often focusing on the Radha-Krishna legend. The term padavali (also written padaabali) has the literal meaning "gathering of songs" (pada=short verse, lyric; +vali = plural; collection).

The padavali poetry reflects an earthy view of divine love which had its roots in the Agam poetry of Tamil Sangam literature (600 BC–300 AD) and spread into early medieval Telugu (Nannaya, Annamayya) and Kannada literatures (Dasa sahitya). These poetic themes spread rapidly as part of the Bhakti movement, which emphasized an intensely personal form of devotion inspired by the philosophy of Ramanuja and rejected caste distinctions and other Brahminical conventions associated with the theism of Adi Shankaracharya. The movement spread out and attained a pan-India status during the 13th–17th centuries.

The accompanying literary movements were marked by a shift from the classical language of Sanskrit, to the local languages (apabhramsha) or derivatives, e.g. the literary language of brajabuli adopted by Vidyapati (14th century) and Govindadas Kaviraj

== History ==
Vidyapati in Mithila (14th century) and Chandidas (late 14th century) in Birbhum. Chandidas was among the earliest poets in the nascent Bengali language, and many of his poems deal with the Radha-Krishna theme.

In 1474, Maladhar Basu translated the 10th and 11th cantos of the Sanskrit Srimad Bhagavatam (composed c. 9th century), into the Bengali poem SriKrsnaVijay. Maladhar focused on Krishna's divine life, with the 10th canto relating the legends of Krishna as a child, and his Leela with the Gopis in Vrindavana. He was honoured by Rukunuddin Barbak Shah with the title Gunaraj Khan.

Although neither Chandidas nor Maladhar Basu were Vaishnavas, they were to lay the foundation for much of the following Vaishnava poetry in Bengal.

=== Vaishnavism in Bengal ===
Vaishnavism in Bengal was given a tremendous boost by Sri Chaitanya (1486–1533), whose intense spiritualism infected many and started a movement across many regions of India. Chaitanya emphasized the role of merely uttering God's name in obtaining emancipation, and songs, sung passionately and leading to a trance-like state, were central to the path of bhakti. Chaitanya himself wrote many (source - ? gaudiya-vaishnavas say, that Chaitanya left only one song: Shikshashtaka) songs on the Radha-Krishna theme, and certainly encouraged the composition of new songs.

Major poets in the ensuing padavali tradition included Murari Gupta (srikriShNachaitanyacharitrAmr^ta), Narahari Sarkar, Basudev Ghosh, Lochandas, Jnanadas, Govindadas, Balaram Das, Syed Sultan and Dwija Chandidas (16th century). The 17th century saw the work of Kaviranjan (chhoto Vidyapati), Kavishekhar, Radhaballabh Das, Ghanashyam Das and Ramgopal Das; and were followed in the 18th century by Vaisnavadas, Chandrashekhar, Radhamohan Thakur (padAmr^tasamudra), Narahari Chakravarty (gItachandroday), Yadunandan and others. Many of the original texts are lost (some may never have been composed, as the songs came down in the kirtan tradition). The later anthology pAdakalpataru collects about 3000 Vaishnava lyrics by 150 poets.

== Poetry and theme ==
The subject matter of the poetry is the love of Radha and Krishna, on the banks of the Yamuna in Vrindavana; their secret trysts in the forests, Krishna's charms including his magic flute, the love of the gopis for Krishna, Radha's viraha on being separated from Krishna and her anguish on seeing him sporting with the other gopis. Much of the poetry, though written by men, focuses on the feelings of a woman in love. Here is a poem from Chandidas, where Radha is talking to a friend:

How can I describe his relentless flute,
which pulls virtuous women from their homes
and drags them by their hair to Shyam
as thirst and hunger pull the doe to the snare?
Chaste ladies forget their wisdom,
and clinging vines shakes loose from their trees,
hearing that music.
Then how shall a simple dairymaid withstands its call?

Chandidasa says, Kala the puppet master leads the dance.
– trans. Edward C. Dimock and Denise Levertov, In praise of Krishna, p. 18

Many of the poets were influenced by the Maithili poet Vidyapati, and some, such as Govindadas, also composed in the brajabuli language.

=== Music ===
Vaishnava music was extremely influential in the evolution of Indian musical tradition. In the 14th century, Amir Khusro, who spent some time in the court at Bengal, was exposed to the Vaishnavite tradition. With the rise of Vrindavana 14th century onwards, there was an admixture of the strains of devotional music from different regions of India. Followers of Vallabhacharya of Andhra and Nimbarkacharya of Maharashtra rubbed shoulders with Vaishnava composers from Bengal and Bihar. Eminent musicians such as Swami Haridas (16th century), reputedly the teacher of Tansen, lived here.

The songs are often set to a romantic raga such as Pilu or Desh, and borrow freely from folk tunes and other traditions.

This musical tradition continues to be popular in Bengal with the Bauls and other kirtaniya groups, who include Sufi Muslims among their practitioners.

=== Literary influence ===
Vaishnava padavali left a lasting mark on Bengali literature. Among others, Rabindranath Tagore was deeply impressed by the works of Govindadas, and wrote many Vaishnava and Baul pieces. His opera Bhanusingher Padavali was composed in the Brajabuli language and included the song Sundari Radhe Awe Bani written by Govindadas.
