= Govindadasa =

Bengali Vaishnava poet and composer

Govindadasa (1535–1613), was a Bengali Vaishnava poet known for his body of devotional songs addressed to Krishna. Living in an atmosphere of Krishna-bhakti preached by Sri Chaitanya (1486–1533), he composed extensively on the Radha-Krishna love legend. He is also known as Govindadasa Kaviraja.

== Life ==
Govindadasa came from a Bengali Baidya family. The younger son of Chiranjeeva and Sunanda, Govindadasa was born in his mother's ancestral home in Srikhanda, a village in Purba Bardhaman district which was one of the centers of Gaudiya Vaishnavism. His grandfather (Sunanda's father) Damodar Sen was also a poet, the author of Sangit Damodar.

His brother Ramachandra Sen was a noted philosopher-poet. After their father's death, Ramachandra went to live in Srikhanda with his maternal grandfather. Even today, members of his family reside there and are known as the Karta Roys. For a short period, Ramachandra and his younger brother Govindadasa lived in the village of Telia Budhuri (now Bhagawangola) in the Murshidabad district. This place has the distinction of being his Shripat.

According to the Chaitanya Charitamrita, in his early life, Govindadasa was at a shakta, a worshiper of the goddess Shakti, (Durga/ Kali). (her worshiped Durga is still regularly worshiped at Srikhand)

== Poetry ==
Govindadas is one of the leading poets of the Vaishnava Padavali movement, a flowering of Bengali poetry from the 14th to 17th centuries, based on the Radha-Krishna legend. The Padavalis reflects an earthy view of divine love that, starting in South India, spread rapidly as part of the Bhakti movement. The literary movement was also marked by a shift from the classical language of Sanskrit, to the local languages (Apabhramsha) or derivatives, e.g. the literary language of Brajabuli. Starting in the 14th century with Chandidas (1339–1399), the Padavali poets included Govindadas, Jnanadas, Maladhar Basu, Sheikh Faizullah, Syed Sultan, Balaram Das, Lochan Das, Basudev Ghosh, Murari Gupta, and Narahari Das. The movement flowered in the 16th century with poets like he also wrote poems in the Brajabuli literary canon influenced by Vidyapati, and is often called "the second Vidyapati".

More than others in the movement, Govindadas was influenced by the work of Maithali poet Vidyapati, and he travelled to Vidyapati's village of Bishphi in Madhubani to collect his works.

His poetic oeuvre is preserved in two texts, the Sangita-Madhava (songs of Krishna) and Gitamrta (nectar songs).

His poems reflect a focus on the lovers' trysts, their anxiousness, and Radha's unhappiness, particularly at Krishna's wanton ways. The poem Shyam Abhisare Chalu Binodini Radha (the lover Radha goes to meet Krishna) talks of how Radha comes to the woods to meet Krishna; when at last they find each other, each gazes on the other and their hair bristles with excitement. In rasabatI Radha rasamaya kAnhA, the lovers fight and exchange angry words, but it all ends in an embrace. Quite often, Govindadas will enter the scene himself, and directly address one of the characters, as part of the vanity (bhanita) line at the end, a traditional line introducing the name of the poet.

His poetry influenced many future generations. In 1884, Rabindranath Tagore composed the opera Bhanusimher PadavalI in this genre. Writing under the disguise of an unknown 17th-century bhakti poet, Tagore also included a song by Govindadas sundari radhe Aoye bani (beautiful Radha comes to the forest), which he set to music. Govindadas continues to be popular today, and his songs are regularly sung as kirtans, especially among Vaishanavas.

Govindadasa's poetry has been translated into English by Arun Biswas, Denise Levertov, and others. Here is a poem on Radha's anguish, where Govindadas personally enters the fray with some (not very sympathetic) advice for Radha:

The marks of fingernails are on your breast
and my heart burns.
Kohl of someone's eyes upon your lips
darkens my face.
I am awake all night
your eyes are red.
So why do you entreat me, Kaan,
saying that you and I have but one heart?...
Go home, then,
says GovindadAsa. - trans. Edward C Dimock and Denise Levertov, In praise of Krishna.

Govinda Das is also the author of the play sangIt sAdhak.

He was listed as a kavirAj (kavi=poet; rAj = king) by Jiva Gosvami.

Another poet by the name of Govindadasa from the 18th century is associated with one of the mangalkavyas of Bengal, kalikAmangala of Govindadasa - a devotional song seeking blessings of the goddess. This is a later (18th century) work, showing the influence of Bharatchandra's Annadamangal.

== See also ==
- Middle Bengali literature
- Chaitanya Mahaprabhu
