= Mithila tradition of Durga Puja =

Durga Puja in Mithila

Mithila tradition of Durga Puja मिथिला परम्परा दुर्गा पूजा
- Idol of Goddess Durga at the Durga Puja Bhavan Mandir in Basuki Bihari village of Mithila. Mithileshwari, Shri Shri 108 Bori Durga Moharani, Begusarai, Mithila
- Nickname: Maithil Durga Puja
- Status: Live
- Genre: Durga Puja tradition in Mithila
- Frequency: annually
- Venue: Durga Puja Bhavan Mandir (community celebration); Gosaunik Ghar (Individual household)
- Location: Mithila region
- Country: India and Nepal
- Participants: Maithil community
- Major events: Kalash Sthapna; Durga Saptashati Paath (daily); Morning and Evening Aarti (daily); Lightings diyas (evening); Jhijhiya dance and songs (daily); Rasanchauki or Pipahi musical playing (daily); Belnati - Beltodi; Khoicha; Mahabhog; Nisha Puja; Kanya Puja; Brahman Bhoj; Jatra Parva
- Organiser: Durga Puja Samiti (public ceremony); Vrati (Individual household)
- People: Chandeshwara Thakur (composer of Kṛtyaratnākara text); Vidyapati (composer of Durgabhaktitaraṅgiṇī); Pandit Lal Das (a composer of Maithilsampradayanusarini Sri Durga Saptashati)
- Authoritative texts: Durgabhaktitaraṅgiṇī; Maithilsampradayanusarini Sri Durga Saptashati
- A part of the tradition of the Shaktism and Tantricism sects in Mithila; Dates and timings according to Mithila Vishwavidyalaya Panchang

The Mithila tradition of Durga Puja (Maithili: मिथिला परंपरा दुर्गापूजा) refers to the unique cultural and rituals process of Durga Puja practiced in the Mithila region of the Indian subcontinent. In the Mithila region, the Sharadiya Navratri and Vijayadashami are the festivals of Vedic chanting, Tantric Sadhana and vibrant expression of folk culture along with religious faith. The Maithil community living in different parts of India and Nepal perform the rituals of the Durga Puja according the tradition of Mithila culture. The rituals of the Mithila's traditional Durga Puja are guided by the indigenous texts composed by the scholars of the region.

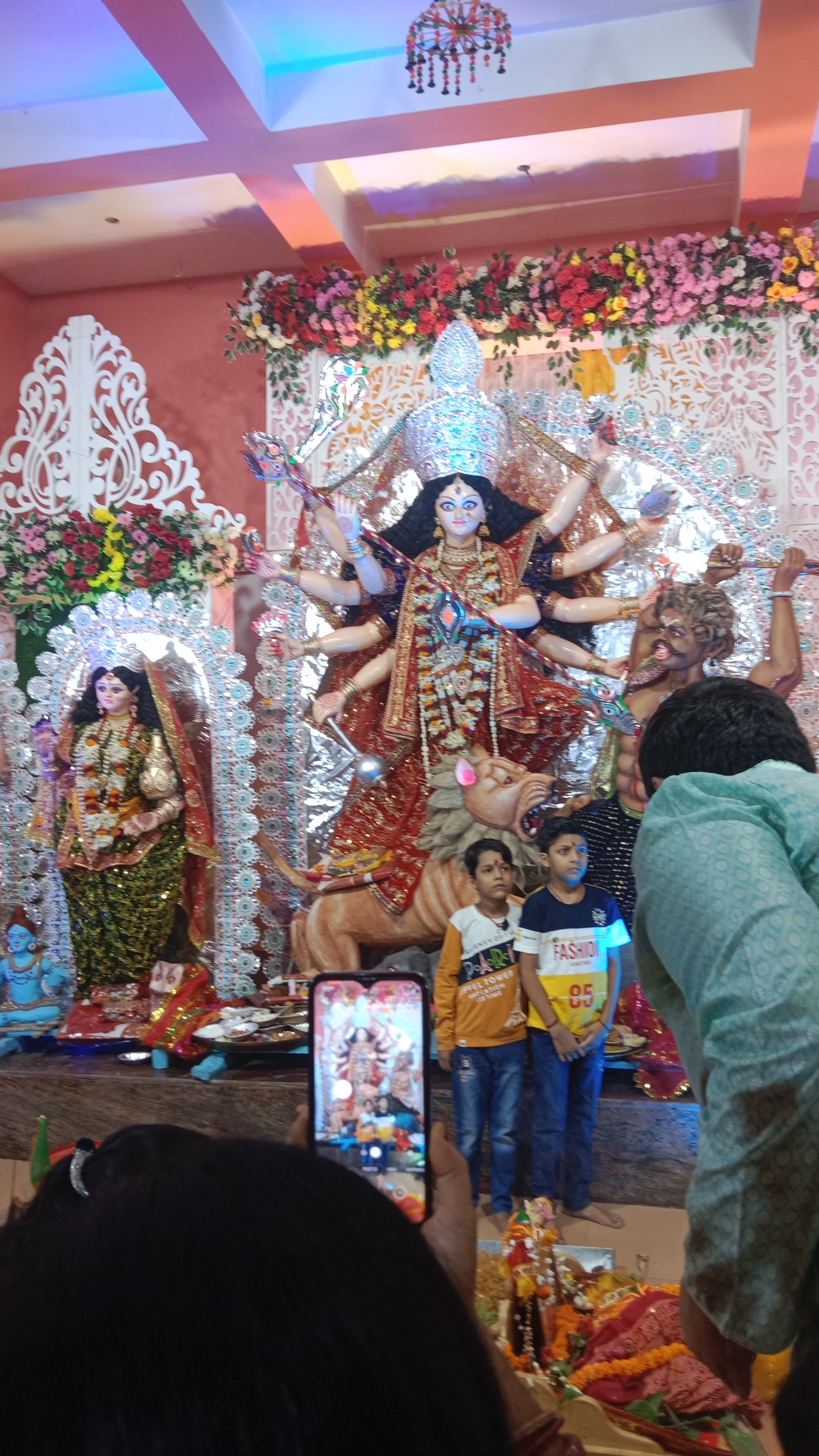
View of a Durga Puja Darbar in Begusarai.

View of a typical Durga Puja Bhavan Mandir at Basuki Bihari village in the Mithila region.

== Description ==
The Mithila tradition of Durga Puja is associated with the Shakti Upasana in the region. It shows the coordination of Vedic mantras, the majesty of the goddess described in the Puranas and the local religious practices. In the Mithila region of the subcontinent, almost every village has at least one Durga Puja Bhavan Mandir in village. The Durga Puja Bhavan Mandir in a village is the place where the annual Durga Puja is organised and performed by the villagers of that village. The Durga Puja is a principal festival in the Mithila region.

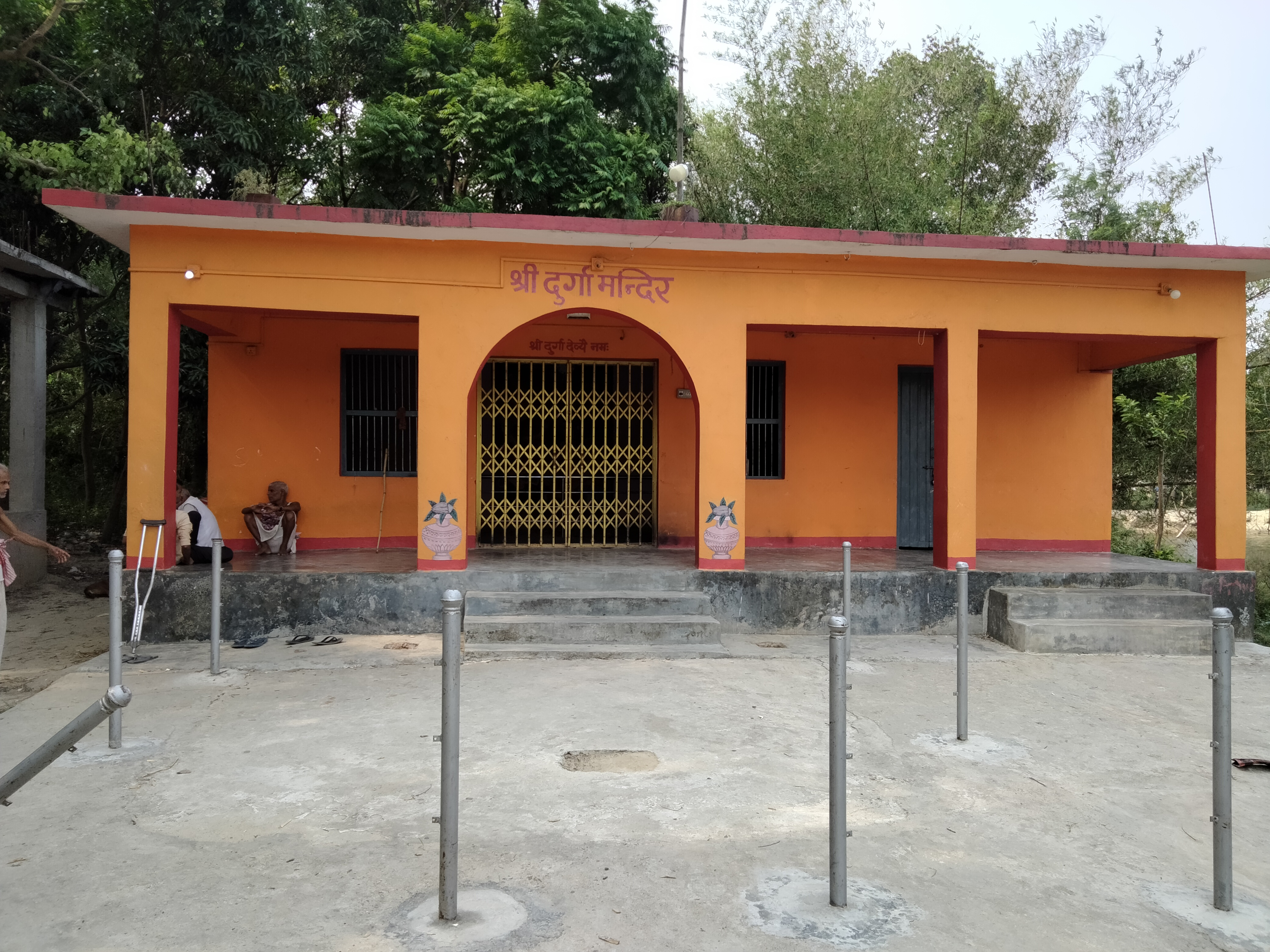
Durga Puja Bhavan Mandir at Banauli village in the Mithila region of Nepal.

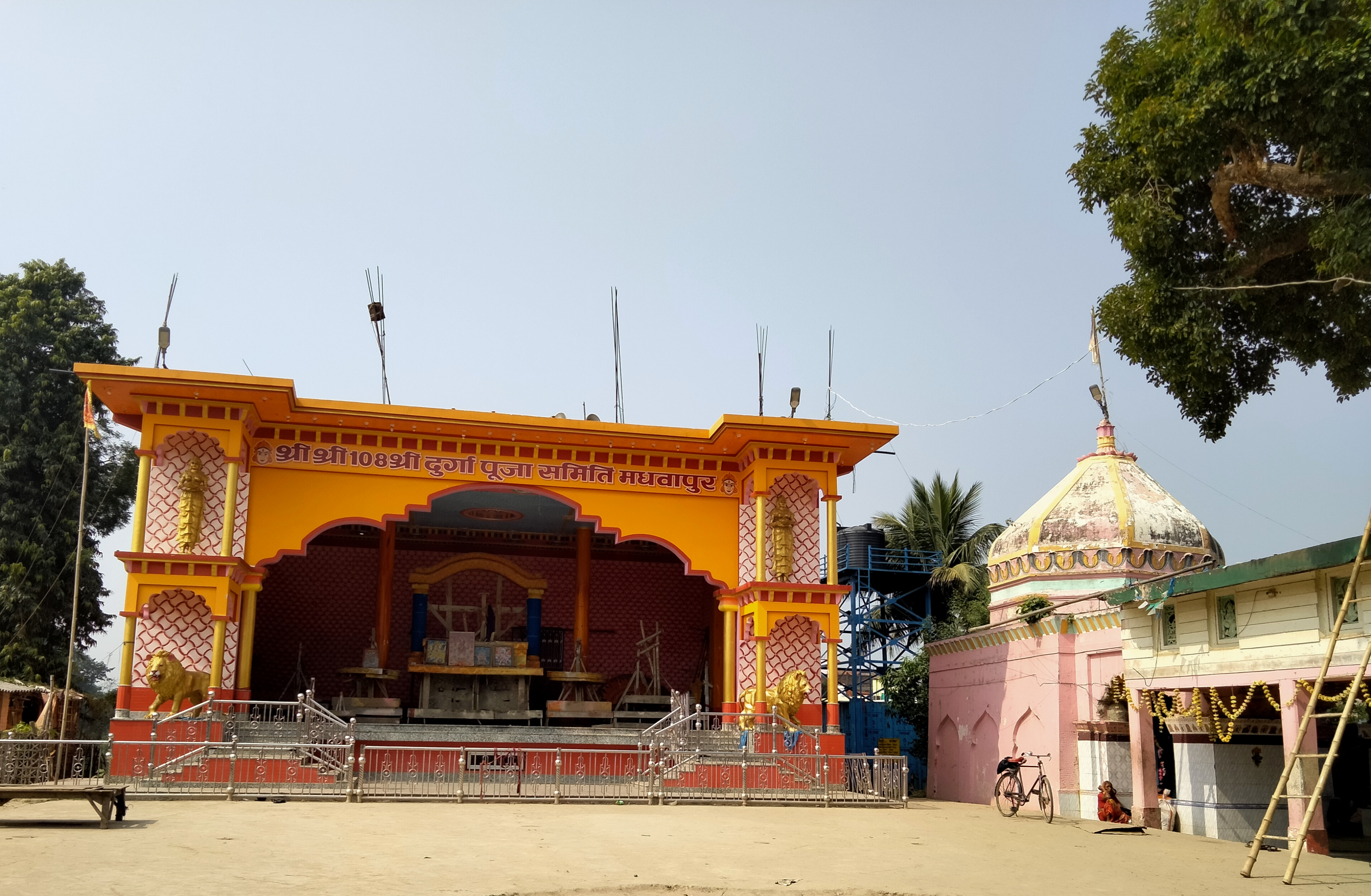
Durga Puja Bhavan Mandir at Madhwapur in the Madhubani district.

In the tradition of the Maithil Durga Puja, the idols of Goddess Durga and other associated deities at the temple are made by using clay brought from farms or ponds. It is the ancient and live tradition in the region.

The tithi(s) and timings for performing different rituals and procedures of the Maithil Durga Puja are guided and decided by the Mithila Vishwavidyalaya Panchang and Mithila Panchang Sabha respectively of the Kameshwar Singh Darbhanga Sanskrit University in the city of Darbhanga.

== Indigenous texts ==
The Durgabhaktitaraṅgiṇī is a major text that describes the Maithil rituals of the Durga Puja. The text was composed by the great Maithil poet Vidyapati in Mithila. The text serves as a manual for the observance of the Durga Puja in the region. The literary work of the poet Vidyapati also reveals the profound influence of Tantricism on the ritual form, which employed Shakta mantras. Similarly the Maithilsampradayanusarini Sri Durga Saptashati is the text for performing paath (recitation) of the Durga Puja in the region. In the tradition of the Maithil sect, the chanting of the Sri Durga Saptashati has a specific arrangement starting with the Argala, Kilaka, and Kavaca before entering the main Saptashati chapters. The Sri Durga Saptashati is also known as Devi Mahatmya or Chandi Paath. The text Maithilsampradayanusarini Sri Durga Saptashati has been edited by several times by different scholars in the region. The Maithili poet Pandit Lal Das was one of the main poet in the region who composed the text with Maithili explanation.

View of Chandi Path chanting by Maithil Brahmins at the Navhath village in the Madhubani district, Mithila.

== Rituals and procedures ==
The Maithil Durga Puja starts with the ritual of Kalash Sthapna at the Durga Puja Bhavan Mandir or at the designated worship place Gosaunik Ghar of individual household. In the household of the Maithil community, the man of the family also worship Lord Shiva and perform the holy rituals of the Parthiva Shivalinga Puja in Mithila during the Durga Puja festival. The Parthiva Shivalingas are prepared by the women of the family. At the community temple, on all the days of the Durga Puja festival, the priests and villagers together recite Durga Saptashati. On each day of the festival, different types of offerings is prepared to offer Goddess Durga and her associates deities on each day of the Navratri. On some special days, Mahabhog (great offering) is offered. The Mahabhog includes tasmai or delicious kheer (rice pudding) to the Mother Goddess. It is believed that it brings special attention towards us by Goddess Durga. Similarly daily aarti of Mata Durga is performed at the temple every morning and evening throughout the festival. On every evening, women or girls of a village gathered at the premises of the temple in the village for lightings diyas (clay lamps). It is conducted before the evening aarti. But the door of the community Durga Puja Bhavan Mandir in a village is not opened for public till the completion of the opening eye ritual called Netra Jyoti Anusthan of the Goddess Durga on the Saptami tithi. The eye opening ritual of the goddess is conducted after the completion of the Beltodi ritual.

View of a sample of Bel fruits tree in India.

After the door opening of the temple, married women devotees in the village flock inside the temple to perform Khoicha ritual. During the ritual of Khoicha, the female devotees offer items such as sari, dhaan (paddy), paan (betel leaves), supari (areca nuts), haldi (turmeric) and sindur (vermillion), etc. The practice of the ritual Khoicha symbolises family happiness and prosperity. Through the Khoichha ritual, Maithil women bid farewell to mother Durga. In the Mithila region, there is a tradition of filling the khoichha at the time of farewell of married daughter from her Naihar. The same tradition of Khoicha is performed here to Goddess Durga by the Maithil women in the region. It is also performed on the Maha Ashtami and Navami day of the festival. In the mid-night of the Saptami day, during the beginning of the Ashtami tithi, a special ritual of Nisha Puja is performed to the Kalratri form of the goddess. The twin Bel fruits brought at the temple after the Beltodi ritual is worshipped as the Kalratri form of the goddess during the Nisha Puja.

View of a Khoicha ritual performed by a Maithil woman in Navi Mumbai.

The ninth day of the festival is known as Mahanavami. On this day, Kanya Puja (worship of unmarried girls) is performed by the vrati (a devotee who do fasting in the festival). At least nine unmarried girls are worshipped by the vrati. According to legend, these nine girls are considered as nine metaphorical symbols of Goddess Durga in Hinduism. Initially, the nine kanyas are welcomed and their feet are washed by the vrati. Then they are worshipped and fed with delicious food. At the end of the ritual, some clothes or some other items are presented to the girls as gifts. On this occasion Brahman Bhoj is also organised by the vrati at her home or at the premises of the community Durga Puja Bhavan Mandir.

In the Mithila region, the Jatara Parva is celebrated on the occasion of Dussehra. In legend, it is believed that Goddess Durga comes to her naihar (maternal home) for nine days during the Navaratri festival and leaves on Dashmi day and goes to her in-laws' house that day. After that she travels back to her consort Lord Shiva. On the occasion of the Jatara Parva, a huge processions of the devotees along with the statues of the deities in the pandals is circumambulated throughout the city or the village. After that the goddess is then bid farewell by immersing her clay idols or statues in rivers and ponds, commemorating her return to the abode of Lord Shiva.

== Cultural activities ==
On the occasion of the traditional Maithil Durga Puja festival, several cultural activities are performed and organised at the premises of the Durga Puja Bhavan Mandir. The traditional Maithil folk dance Jhijhiya is a major cultural activity performed on every evening at the premises of the temple or the Durga Puja pandal. It is a cultural heritage of the Mithila region practiced during the Durga Puja festival. It is the part of Bhagwati Aradhna (prayer to Bhagwati). It is performed to please Goddess Durga. It is also performed at the premises of the Dihwar temple called Brahma Sthan of the village.

Ladies performing Jhijhiya dance.

Similarly, the traditional folk musical playing Rasanchauki or Pipahi is the unique cultural musical playing in the Mithila region, that is played at the Darbar of Goddess Durga on the occasion of Sharadiya Maithil Durga Puja. It is an ancient musical tradition of Mithila's folk faith, traditional music and cultural identity.

== History ==
The tradition of Durga Puja in Mithila is one of the oldest traditions in the subcontinent in which the Goddess Durga is worshipped ceremonially and publicly. Since the ancient times in the Mithila region, the celebration of the Durga Puja festival was sponsored and patronised by the rulers of the kingdom. The most detailed account of a court-sponsored ritualistic ceremony comes from the courts of the Karnata and Oiniwar dynasties in Mithila; this appears to represent a ritual of the Navarātra that had already matured centuries before being recorded in official literature in the subcontinent. The court-sponsered ceremony of the festival was associated with the Heroic Shāktism in which it is believed that a good king and a true warrior must worship the goddess Durga, who is the very embodiment and essence of kingship. The Karnat Dynasty was ruling the Kingdom of Mithila from his then capital Simraungadh. The court-sponsered ceremony of the Durga Puja was held in the city of Simraungadh in Mithila. In the 14th century during the rule of the Karnat Dynasty, the Maithil scholar Chandeshwar Thakur composed a text called Kṛtyaratnākara which contained chapter on the rites of the Ashvin Durga Puja. It is considered as the earliest source for the rituals of the Durga Puja in Mithila.

In a local record, the tradition of the public celebration of the Durga Puja festival at the Purvari Tol in the village of Arer in the Madhubani district, is approximately 300 years old. In the early period, the idols of Goddess Durga were installed at hut type community temples in the villages of region.

The Maithil Durga Puja or Navratri worship is deeply rooted in the local folk beliefs, family rites, and community traditions. These beliefs have been passed down from generation to generation through the local folk songs, religious tales, folklores and traditional rituals in region.

== Outside the Mithila region ==
The Mithila tradition of Durga Puja festival is also practised beyond the territorial region of Mithila. It is practiced in the several metropolitan cities like Mumbai, New Delhi, etc in the Indian subcontinent. The Maithil communities living in these cities celebrate and perform the rituals of Durga Puja according to the Maithil culture.
