= Middle Bengali literature =

The term Middle Bengali literature (Bengali: মধ্যযুগীয় বাংলা সাহিত্য), refers to the literature written in the form of the Bengali language known as Middle Bengali. It was a period in the history of Bengali literature. This period dated from 14th to 18th centuries, following the events of Turkic Muslim conquest of Bengal in the 13th century to English East India Company's colonization of Bengal in 18th century. In this period literature in vernacular Bengali began to take shape.

The Middle Bengali Literature is divided into three periods, named: Early Middle Age or Pre-Chaitanya Era, Chaitanya Era, and Later Middle Age.

== History ==
=== Early Middle Age Bengali literature ===
Early Middle Age Bengali literature (Bengali: প্রাক-মধ্যযুগীয় বাংলা সাহিত্য), also known as Pre-Chaitanya Era (Bengali: প্রাক-চৈতন্য যুগের বাংলা সাহিত্য), spanned from approximately late thirteen or early fourteenth century to late fifteenth centuries. During that period, Bengali literature saw the development of three literary genres: Vaishnava Padabali, Mangalkavya, and translated literature.

=== Vaishnava Padabali ===
The Vaishnava Padabali (Bengali: বৈষ্ণব পদাবলী) movement refers to a period in medieval Bengali literature, marked by an efflorescence of Vaishnava poetry often focusing on the Radha-Krishna legend.

Chandidas (late 14th century) in Birbhum, was among the earliest poets in the Middle Bengali language, and many of his poems deal with the Radha-Krishna theme. In 1474, Maladhar Basu translated the 10th and 11th cantos of the Sanskrit Srimad Bhagavatam (composed c. 9th century), into the Bengali poem Shri Krishna Bijay. Maladhar focused on Krishna's divine life, with the 10th canto relating the legends of Krishna as a child, and his Leela with the Gopis in Vrindavana. He was honoured by Rukunuddin Barbak Shah with the title Gunaraj Khan. It is also the oldest Bengali narrative poem of Krishna legend. It was composed between 1473 and 1480.

Although neither Chandidas nor Maladhar Basu were Vaishnavas, they were to lay the foundation for much of the following Vaishnava poetry in Bengal.

=== Mangal Kavya ===
Mangal kavyas are a group of Bengali religious texts, composed more or less between 13th and 18th centuries, notably consisting of narratives of indigenous deities of rural Bengal in the social scenario of the Middle Ages. The Mangal Kavyas usually emphasize a particular deity amalgamated with a Vedic or Hindu mythological god, and the narratives are usually written in verses.

== Chaitanya Era Bengali literature ==
In the Chaitanya Era (16th-17th century), the later Vaishnava Poetry and the hagiography of Sri Chaitanya flourishes. In this period, the translation of Mahābhārata into Bengali grows, and important development in Mangalkāvya tradition is seen.

== Later Middle Age Bengali literature ==
In the Later Middle Age, the tradition of Shakta Poetry or Shakta Padāvali grows. The age of Mangalkavya meets its end with the composition of Annadamangal by Bharatchandra Ray. The Baul tradition emerges as an intellectual icon with Lalan Fakir. The most important development is the rapid growth of Eastern Bengal Ballads and Muslim Ghazals are among the most important aspects of this period, particularly the work of poets like Alaol and Daulat Qazi.

== See also ==
- Bengal Sultanate
- Brajabuli
- Dobhashi
- Bengali Queer Literature
- Bengali literature of Tripura
- Bengali-speaking world
