= Maithili music =

Music of the Mithila region

Maithili Music is one of the most ancient types of music in the Indian subcontinent. It originated from Mithila, a geographical and cultural region of the Indian subcontinent bounded by the Mahananda River in the east, the Ganges in the south, the Gandaki River in the west and by the foothills of the Himalayas in the north. It comprises certain parts of Bihar and Jharkhand of India and adjoining districts of the eastern Terai of Nepal. No one knows exactly when Maithili Music came into existence, probably due to the length of its history, but its age indicates that it might have helped other music develop and flourish in India and Nepal.It is believed that many new types of music forms have been sprouted from Maithili music as it is believed to be the oldest form of music is South Asia. Maithili music are played during a variety of ritual occasions, and it is believed that some of the most melodic music among them. The music was generally based on the daily life of a common man which made it relatable to the audience and hence accepted on mass. Although Maithili music is usually played by classical instruments, it has been modernized and now uses various modern instruments. Some significant contributors to this music style are Maha Kavi Vidyapati Thakur, Udit Narayan Jha, Sharda Sinha, Kunj Bihari Mishra, Haridwar Prasad Khandelwal, Dr. Shanti Jain, Rajni Pallavi, Poonam Mishra, Ranjana Jha, Moni 'Vaidehi' and many more.

== Religion and Culture ==
It is the folksong of Bhilini, one of the many Maithili Music classics, that influenced Gautam, the Buddha, to draw the essence of his all-time great philosophy -Madhyama marg. As a result, Mithila has been established as a great cultural center and Vidya-kshetra. Its cultural, mainly scholastician, history dates back to millenniums. Its pristine glory is recorded in the Vedas and the Satpath Brahmana.

Maithili Music is said to be the song of the gods. Many of the songs are used as way to pray to the gods. Songs relating to agriculture and Devotional songs are the two main type songs which can see as prayers to the God above. The songs describe the outstanding traits of the gods and goddesses and sometimes the traits of their worshipers. These songs called gosaunik git or gosaun . The Maithili region lies in part of North India and Nepal which is wet and lush green as it is covered with bamboo structures, paddy fields and ponds . It is said to look like the resting place of goddess Kali and Durga which are prominent in the worship rites of the masses. There many songs which are based on the surrounding are as if describing the beauty and the grandeur of the goddesses resting place

Furthermore, In South Asia where marriages for women are a religious event Maithili song are played to a great extent. Women most often classify wedding songs according to the name of the rituals, however generally the auspicious day of marriage begins with the Suhag song and concludes with the samdaun. However, singing many songs during weddings might be a bit problematic now due to the fact that nowadays people waste less time and pay less money for their weddings. Furthermore, there are some Maithili music that describe the hardships faced by woman in the Maithili region. Maithili women, located in south-eastern Nepal, are pitted against one another in their pursuit of security and resources in the context of patrilineal formations. There are many folksongs that talk about the injustice of woman at the hands of men and their many of the folksongs that talk about women thinking of counter measures and alternate ways to survive in the world dominated by men. This is also the time when themes of feminism started to appear in folksongs .

Maithili Music has been based around the daily lives of normal men. As a result, the lyrics include a lot of references of objects, gods, seasons and surrounding area of Maithili. These references can help to understand the beauty of the region and can also tell us a lot about the society of the past. These references, further, have also been used as metaphors to comment on the society of the past and its norms. Maithili folksongs include a lot of songs about gods as previously mentioned, but they also have a lot of songs relating to seasons and agriculture. Songs whose themes are based around the rainy or the monsoon season are associated with farmers praying to the gods for favourable climate to cultivate. There are also many songs related to farmers asking for a good harvest. There are many themes relating to good harvest because agriculture was one of the main occupations in the past as well in the present. In Maithili music even the reference of nature helps in bringing out the meaning of the music's lyrics. In the Maithili region of Nepal the use of pond signifies and refers to a woman's perspective and knowledge of worldly matters .

== Classification ==
There are many types of Maithili music. Anthropologists and sociologists have been able to classify the different folksongs based on their common theme. Kailash Mishra (n.d.) in his article classifies the Maithili music in the following categories: 1. Songs representing the life- cycle events: There are many songs that represent life-cycle events -birth, initiation rites, marriage etc. Women start singing Sahara songs (Maithili music based on woman's dependence during labour) on the sixth day of the birth of a baby to please and express thanks to Mother Goddess Sastika. Literary Sahara songs are sung with the description of the birth of Krishna and Rama. During woman's labor songs of husbands calming their wives during the process of birth are played to calm the anxiety of the woman. Furthermore, during marriages which is considered a religious event Maithili music is played. Lullabies and cradlesongs which are sung to children to calm them down and keep them happy also come under this category.: 2. Songs representing the annual calendar of events: Songs that fall under this category are further classified as agriculture songs and festival songs. The agricultural songs are mainly sung by farmers where they pray and hope for good harvest at the end of the year. These songs narrate the farmers hope and dreams for a good harvest and the also tell the struggles faced by farmers during the period. Festival songs are generally sung during festivals and events of celebration. The cycle of festivals, begins with the month of Chiatra (an auspicious month in The Hindu Calendar. Its equivalent would be 13 April to 11 May). Several songs are sung during the celebration of the festivals of Ramnavami, Batsavitri, Nagapanchami, Madhushrabani, Kojegra, Samachakeba, Bhardutia and many more. 3. Seasonal songs: These songs can be further classified or separated into five basic types: a) Religious, b) agricultural c) narrative, d) lamentation of deserted love e) womanhood and chastity. The basic theme of these songs is of frustration or disappointment in love often caused to the absence of a husband or a lover and farmers praying for monsoon to arrive. These songs can be found as a narration of the whole year with specific months being popular among the masses. Barahmasa, Chahomasa and Chanmasa are a few of the popular Maithili music in this category. 4. Wisdom songs: These types of songs reflect on the intelligence of people, however there are some songs that explain on how to retain knowledge. The reference of ponds are generally found in this category. 5. Devotional songs: These songs are generally played to prayer to the god and goddesses. For example, Bhajan and Kirtan is played to pray to God Shiva, Vishnu, Ganaga and Shakti, Gosaunik-git and Bhagabati-git are sung in praise of family deities, however the mendicant's songs are played for the beggars and helpless people and the texts express the disability, helplessness and distress of the singer.: 6. Songs of love and beauty: These songs target the inner most feelings of a loved one. All aspects of love are revealed through this type of Maithili music. The songs of this category include Batagami, Gwalari, Raasa and Maana which tell tales about their characters different love tales. 7. Songs of glory: These songs describe the tales of glory, history, and beauty of the land. They also share tales of different mythical characters and their brave and gloried adventures through the different lands. Overall, the lyrics of this kind of music is basically an account of different incidents or event.

== Types of Melodies ==
=== The Melismatic Style ===
This type of melody is the oldest melody with its free style. The is generally based on one's own intuition and gains popularity as it has been accepted by the modern era as those who want to learn song usually chooses the one melismatic style of melody.Athongar is an example of one of the genres which uses this melody and is usually played during weddings and is also a part of wedding rites that take place during the night. When the song is sung the groom along with some other men beat the rice husking pestle which signifies and symbolises the groom joining the labour force. Athongar is a genre which focuses on free singing without a steady beat which results in melismatic singing. Jog is another genre under this melody and it is also generally played during weddings. It describes when the groom while at his brides place isn't allowed to eat salted food, but on the fourth day on the traditional wedding is fed food with salt. Jog is very similar to athongar in the sense of its free spirited, intuitional based and melismatic natured songs. The third genre is called Lagan and it tells us about the difficulties faced while preparing for the wedding. It is usually from the viewpoint of the mother or close relatives of the bride or groom. The genre has many mentions and references to the problems faced by god Ram and goddess Sita during their marriage (Ramayana). In comparison to the other genres Lagan has a more steady beat.

=== The Out of Phase Tune Test Relationship ===
This melody has a distinctive feature of delayed sense of the melody at the beginning of the verse, coupled with a steady beat and less melisma. This melody is less popular than the previous melody and uses the samdum music character more prominently. Three principal genres exemplify these features are the samdaun, uddasi, and kumar. Samdaun concerns with the plight of the bride. The bride's friends and family sing a song of this genre when the bride is leaving her home. The tune and the text of songs in this genre are out off phase. The second genre is kumar and it is also the most common genre used in many different parts of a wedding ceremony such as the time when the bride is handed to the groom and during the period of Samar (they describe heroic feats and is performed when the groom receives the bride). The tune and the text of the song in the genre seem to be more in tune with each other. the tune of uddasi is very similar to samdaun and is sung during the wedding rites.
