= Vidyapati Dham =

Lord Shiva temple in Mithila related to Vidyapati

Vidyapati Dham Mandir
- विद्यापति धाम मंदिर
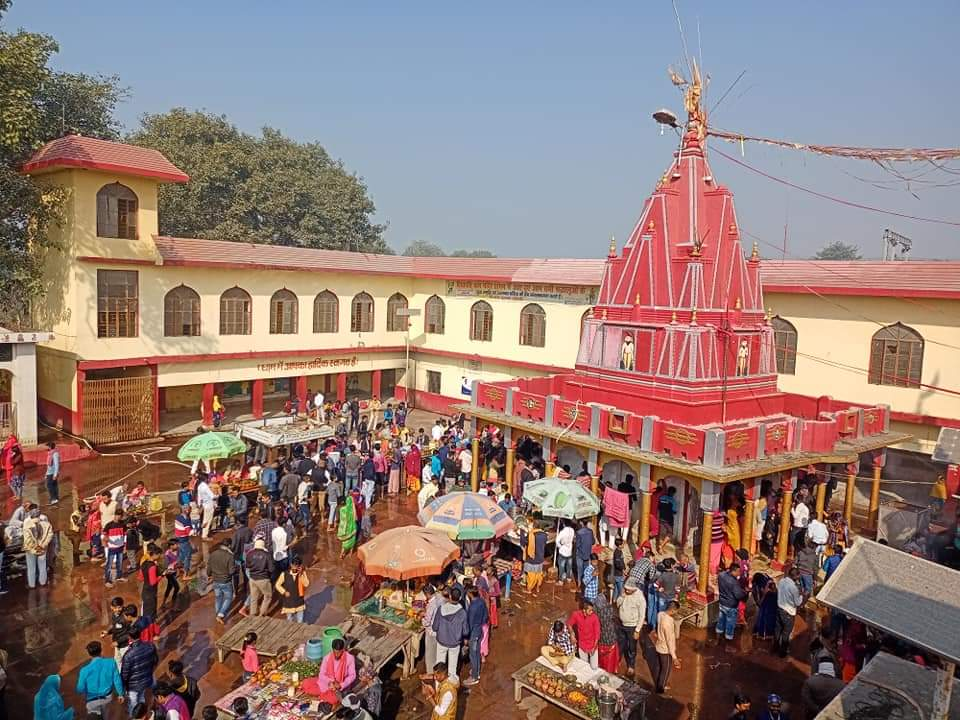
- View of the temple at Vidyapati Dham

Religion
- Affiliation: Hinduism
- District: Samastipur district
- Deity: Lord Shiva

Location
- Location: Baleshwar Sthan, Vidyapati Nagar
- State: Bihar
- Country: India
- Interactive map of Vidyapati Dham Mandir
- Coordinates: 25.6015316°N 85.8007872°E
- Nirvana place of poet Vidyapati

Vidyapati Dham (Maithili: विद्यापति धाम) is a Hindu shrine dedicated to Lord Shiva and the Maithili poet Vidyapati. It is also the Nirvana place of the Maithili poet Vidyapati. It is located at Vidyapati Nagar village of the Samastipur district in the Mithila region of Bihar in India. It is famous in the region for offering sacred Jalabhisheka on the Shivaling of Lord Shiva in the temple located in the premises. It is also known as Baleshwar Sthan.

== Description ==
Vidyapati Dham is a historical as well as legendary place related to the great Maithili poet Vidyapati in the Mithila region of the Indian subcontinent. It is the historical place where the Maithili poet Vidyapati lived his last moments of his life. Every year a grand three days festival known as Vidyapati Rajkiye Mahotsav dedicated to the Maithili poet Vidyapati is organised and celebrated at the premises of the shrine by the Government of Bihar. During the celebration of the festival, the prominent ministers or political leaders of the governments of India or Bihar in the region come here to participate in festival. It has been recognised as a state festival by the Government of Bihar

== Legend ==
According to legend, the place is associated with Lord Shiva, his notable devotee Vidyapati and Goddess Ganga. It is said that when the poet Vidyapati was in the journey to meet Goddess Ganga, he got tired at this place. Then Goddess Ganga came there to meet her devotee Vidyapati at this very place.

According to the temple administration, the Maithili poet Vidyapati walked towards Ganges river during his last moments. He became very tired on reaching this place and sat down here. Then he asked a shepherd present nearby that how far the Ganges river was from there. Then the shepherd replied that the distance was two and a half to three kosh. After listening the reply, Vidyapati stopped there saying that if he could come from that far for Goddess Ganga, then why couldn't Mother Ganga come till here? According to legend, it is said that after that a flow of the Ganges river reached there and took Vidyapati with it. The poet Vidyapati got his final liberation from the life there and it became popular as the Nirvana place of the poet.
