= Kulingram =

- Village
- Interactive map of Kulingram

Area
  - Total: 8.49 km^{2} (3.28 sq mi)

Population (2020)
  - Total: 8,565
  - Density: 1,010/km^{2} (2,610/sq mi)

Kulingram is a village in Purba Bardhaman district in West Bengal, India under the Jamalpur CD Block.

The traditions of Jain, Buddhist and Vaishnava cultures have been found in different regions of the Jamalpur Thana, including Kulingram. Festivals such as Manasa Puja are celebrated, and deities such as Shiva and Dharmaraj are worshipped. Around six thousand people of both non-Hindu and non-Muslim communities live in Kulingram under Abujahti II Village Panchayat. People of Brahmin, Kayastha, Ugra Kshatriya, Dule, Bagdi, Dhivar castes, and indigenous people, live in Kulingram.

Kulingram is a Vaisnava pilgrimage centre where the practice of Vaishnavism began in the pre-Sri Chaitanya era. The first wave of Bangladesh's Krishnakatha was born in this village, which was long before the birth of Sri Chaitanya Mahaprabhu in Navadwip. Maladhar Basu, the first Vaishnava poet of Bengal, was born in Kulingram.

== Demographics ==
The total population of the village in 2020 was 8,565, out of which 4354 were male and 4211 female.

== Transport ==
The communication system with different cities of the country, along with rail and road, is quite well organized.

Kulingram is 5 km from the Jogram station of Howrah-Burdwan chord line. North-East and Howrah-Bardhaman Main Line is 8 km from Debipur Station.
