= Rasan Chauki =

Folk musical band of Mithila

- View of the musical play of Rasan Chauki performed at the Jageshwar Gaachhi in the Basuki Bihari village during Baskatti ritual of a Maithil Upanayan.
- Native name: रसन चौकी
- Other names: Panchbajna: Naubat
- Stylistic origins: Mithila's folk tune
- Cultural origins: Mithila Kingdom
- Typical instruments: Folk musical instruments band

Rasan Chauki (Maithili: रसन चौकी) refers to a Mithila's traditional folk instrument group. The group plays Maithili folk sounds during religious ceremonies and cultural occasions in the Mithila region of the Indian subcontinent. It is often played during the festival of Durga Puja, religious ceremonies of Maithil Vivah, Mundan, Maithil Upanayan and Chhath Puja, etc. It is a cultural heritage of the Maithil community in the subcontinent. It is also known as the musical folk band of the Mithila region. It contains a group of five traditional instruments. It was first played during the legendary marriage between Lord Rama and Goddess Sita at the court of King Janaka in the ancient Mithila Kingdom. It is also called as Panchbajna or Naubat.

Rasan Chauki at Laxman Garden, Basuki Bihari during the beginning of a Maithil Upanayan ceremony.

== Etymology ==
Rasan Chauki is the apabhramsa (a corruption) of Roshan Chowki, meaning a seat that sits in a bright environment that is an auspicious occasion. The other name Panchbajna translates to the "five musical instruments for playing tunes".

== Description ==
In the culture of Mithila, the tradition of Rasan Chauki is recognized as an invocation instrument or invocation music. It is performed on almost every auspicious occasion of a Maithil family in the region. The folk instrument Rasan Chauki is categorised as the oldest folk art of playing in the region. It is the indigenous musical instrument band of Mithila. The Rasan Chauki is performed to play folk tune of the region. It is the playing of only tune but not songs.

Playing traditional tunes of Rasan Chauki.

In the early period, at least six artists were required to perform the play of the folk tunes of the Rasan Chauki instrumental music of Mithila. Nowadays, at least five artists are required to play the folk tunes of the Rasan Chauki. But sometimes the number of artists is also less than five. The profession of playing Rasanchauki folk tunes is heridatery. The artists playing the Rasanchauki folk tunes belong to the Chamar community in the Mithila region of the subcontinent.

The tunes of the Rasan Chauki is only played for auspicious occasion. Its tune is also known as Mangal Dhun. It is never played for a mournful or sad tone or at a condolence occasion.

== Instruments ==
The Rasanchowki mainly uses five instruments. These five instruments are pipahi, dhol, tabli, khurdak and kara. In the early period, Dhuthur was also included in the orchestra of the Rasan Chauki. Among these six instruments, two instruments are played by blowing, while the sound of the remaining four instruments is based on beats.

Dhuthur and Pipahi are played by blowing. Similarly, Tabli, Diggi or Khurdak and Kara are played by percussion. The performance of the Rasan Chauki folk tunes is not easy. It requires special training to the artists for playing the folk tunes. It is played by blowing into the instruments like pipahi and Dhuthur. This requires a great deal of breath and strength of the artists.

== Legend and origin ==
According to legend, it is said that the tradition of Rasanchauki started with the birth of the princess Sita of Mithila. It was initially played during the manifestation of the Goddess Sita as a baby. It was also performed during her marriage with the prince Rama of Ayodhya. It has been continuing from generation to generation till now.

== State recognition ==
Recently, the Government of India has recognised the traditional Rasan Chauki folk tunes of Mithila. In the year 2026, the president Droupadi Murmu of India, awarded the Sangeet Natak Akademi Award (2024–2025) to the artist Mahendra Ram for the Rasan Chauki art of Mithila.

Similarly, the chief minister Samrat Chaudhary of Bihar, also observed the Rasan Chauki musical tradition of Mithila at Rajnagar during his visit in the village. There he met the popular artist Mahendra Ram of the Rasan Chauki folk tunes and said that the preservation of such folk traditions is important.
