= Durgabhaktitarangini =

Sanskrit text dedicated to the worships of Goddess Durga in Mithila

- दुर्गाभक्तितरङ्गिणी

Information
- Religion: Hinduism
- Author: Vidyapati
- Language: Sanskrit
- Period: 15th century
- Also known as Durgotsav Padhati
- Associated with the tradition of 'Shaakta sect' (Shaktism) in Mithila.
- Manual text for rituals and worships in the Mithila tradition of Durga Puja

Durgabhaktitarangini (Sanskrit: दुर्गाभक्तितरङ्गिणी, Romanised: Durgābhaktitaraṅgiṇī) or Durga Bhakti Tarangini also known as Durgotsav Padhati is a 15th-century Hindu religious Sanskrit text related to the worship of Goddess Durga in the Mithila region in the Indian subcontinent. It was composed by the Maithili poet Vidyapati in Mithila. It was written at the behest of Maharaja Bhairav Singh of the Oiniwar Dynasty in Kingdom of Mithila. The text primarily cites and collects the evidences of the worship procedures from the Puranas texts Kalika Purana, Devi Purana, Bhavishya Purana, Brahma Purana, and Markandeya Purana. It is the authoritative text for the Maithils community in the subcontinent as the rituals manual dedicated to the worship of Goddess Durga in Mithila.
