= Abahattha =

Stage in the evolution of the Eastern group of the Indo-Aryan languages

- Region: India
- Extinct: 14th century
- Language family: Indo-European: Indo-Iranian; Indo-Aryan; Eastern (Magadhan); Abahattha
- Writing system: Devanagari, Bengali-Assamese, Tirhuta, Odia

Language codes
- ISO 639-3: None (mis)
- Glottolog: None

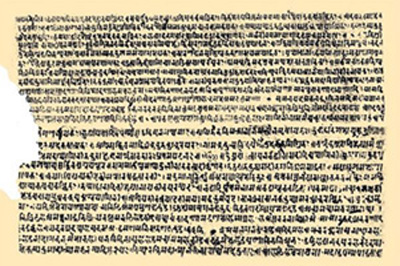
An excerpt from the 10th-century Dakarnava (written in Abahattha).

Abahaṭ‌ṭha, Abahatta or Avahaṭṭha (Sanskrit: अपभ्रष्ट, romanized: Apabhraṣṭa, lit. 'corrupted', related to Apabhraṃśa) is a stage in the evolution of the Eastern group of the Indo-Aryan languages. This group consists of languages such as Assamese, Bengali, Bhojpuri, Magahi, Maithili, and Odia. Abahatta is considered to follow the Apabhraṃśa stage—i.e. those Apabhraṃśas derived from Magadhi Prakrit.

After different business and trading classes, including the Jains, rose in power and influence at the end of the ninth century CE, the widespread speaking of classical Sanskrit waned. Apabhransa and Abahatta thus became very popular, especially amongst common people, functioning as a lingua franca throughout the north of the Indian subcontinent.

Abahatta, which existed from the 6th century to the 14th century, was contemporaneous with some Apabhraṃśas, as well as early modern languages, such as Old Odia, Old Bengali and Kamarupi Prakrit. Many poets, such as the Charyapada poets, who wrote dohas or short Buddhist religious verses, composed both in Abahatta and modern languages; the Maithili poet Vidyapati wrote his poem Kirtilata in Abahatta. Many works authored in Abahatta were translated into Sanskrit, while other texts were also written using multiple languages, such as Somprabha's Kumarpala Pratibodha in 1195.

The Abahattha stage is characterised by:

- Loss of affixes and suffixes.
- Loss of grammatical gender.
- Increased usage of short vowels.
- Nasalisation at the end or in the middle of words.
- The substitution of h for s.
