= Jhijhiya =

South Asian folk dance

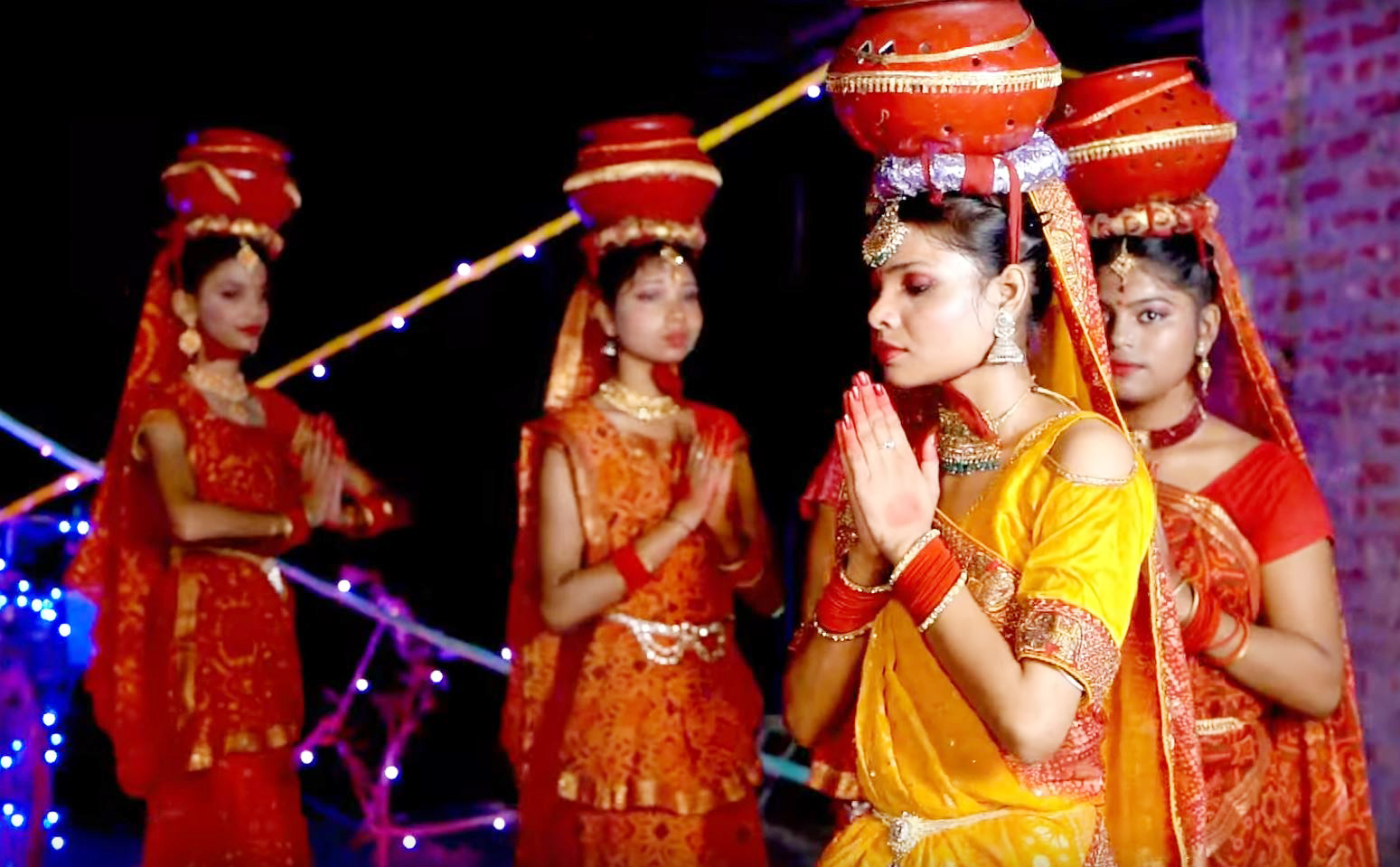
- Women performing Jhijhiya dance
- Native name: झिझिया ঝিঝিয়া
- Genre: Folk dance
- Instrument(s): Manjira, Dhol
- Origin: Mithila of (India and Nepal)
- Associated to the Mithila tradition of Durga Puja

Jhijhiya is a traditional folk dance of the Mithila region of Nepal and India.. It is primarily performed by the Musahar community in the region and is dedicated to Goddess Durga Bhairavi. It is performed during the Dusshera festival, in the Hindu month of Ashwin (September/October). The dance is performed to offer devotion towards goddess Durga—the goddess of victory as well as to protect one's family, children and society from witches and dark magic.

It is performed for ten consecutive evenings, from the day of Ghatasthapana to Bijaya Dashami, by women and girls, in a group of five to fifteen, by placing earthen pitchers on their head and dancing in a rotating manner. Inside the pitcher a fire lamp is placed and multiple holes are made in the pitcher. It is believed that if a witch is successful in counting the holes in the pitcher, the dancer dies immediately.

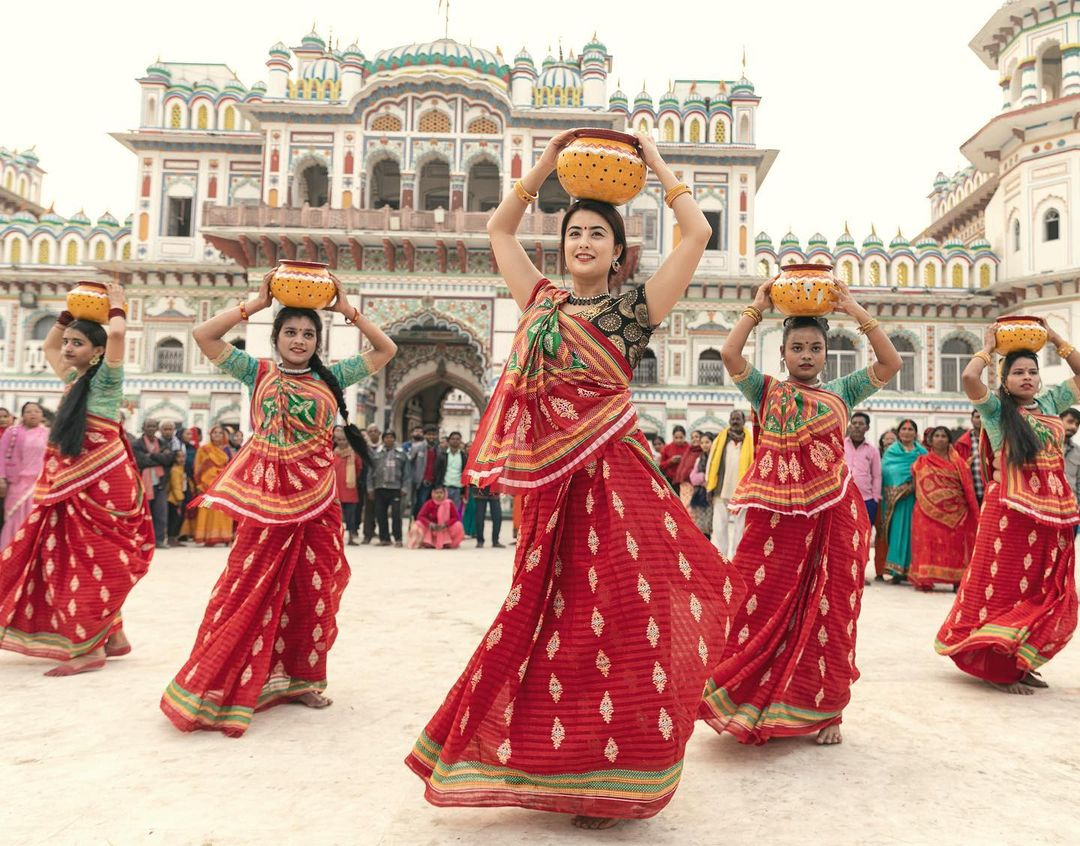
Performance of the Jhijhiya folk dance at the premises of the Janaki Mandir in the capital of Mithila i.e; Janakpur.

== Origin myth ==
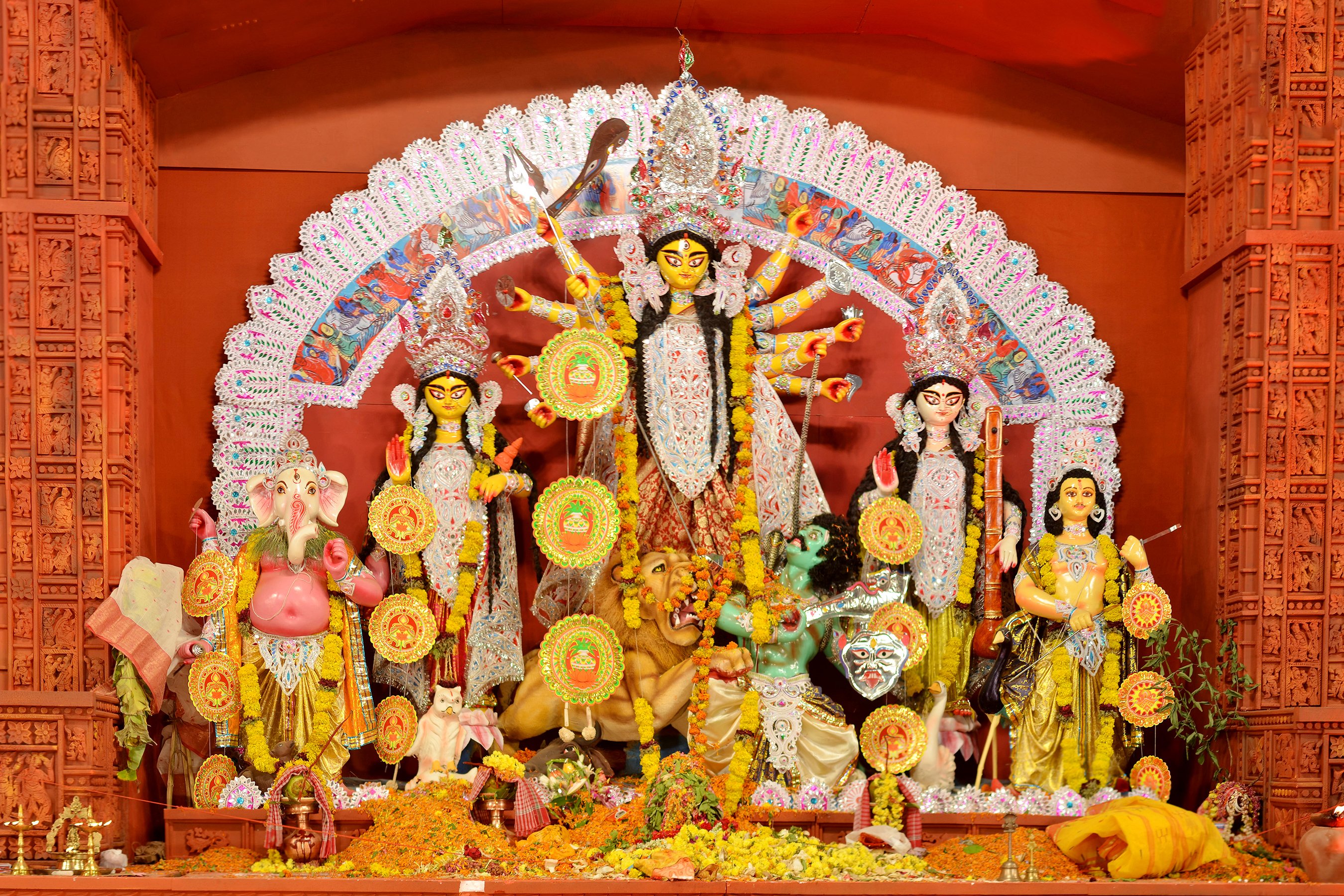
Jhijhiya is performed from the first day of Ghatasthapana to Bijaya Dashami in the Hindu month of Ashvin.

Since the culture is passed in oral forms from generation to generation, there is no exact authority about the origin of the dance form. According to a myth associated to the dance, there once lived a king named Chitrasen in Janakpurdham. His consort, the queen was an expert in dark arts. She was also significantly younger than the king. The royal couple was however childless. The king decided to name his nephew Balruchi as his successor. The queen was infatuated with Balruchi. She tried to woo him multiple times but failed every time. One day, the queen was frustrated and decided to take revenge on Balruchi. She used her black magic to pretend she was ill. The king ordered the Ayurvedic physician for her treatment. The Ayurvedic medicine was not successful against the queen's magic. She then told the king that only way she could be fine again was if she bathed in Balruchi's blood. The king was hesitant against that treatment but since he loved his wife and wanted to save her life, he ordered the soldiers to kill Balruchi and bring his blood.

The royal soldiers could not bring themselves to kill Balruchi and decided to free him in the forest. Instead they brought the blood of a deer, with which the queen bathed and became fine again. In the forest, Balruchi met an old woman. Since, Balruchi was hungry and needed a shelter, he asked some food and a place to stay for the night with that woman. The woman took pity on him and adopted him instead. The old woman was however a powerful witch. She and Balruchi stayed together. One day, the king and queen were passing through the forest, when one of the king's palanquin carrier died. A search for a man was made in the forest for another palanquin carrier and Balruchi was found. However, both Balruchi and king did not recognise each other and neither did Balruchi and the queen.

As the king's procession continued again, the king started to hum a song but forgot some lines. The king was not able to remember the lines even after several tries. Then the king heard the new palanquin carrier singing the remaining lines. Only one person beside the king knew the lyrics to the song and that person was Balruchi. In this way, he recognised Balruchi. The queen also felt guilty at that moment and she and the king both asked Balruchi for his forgiveness and asked him to come back at the palace. Balruchi decided to go back with them, which angered the old witch very much. She started performing magic spells at him, which hurt him. The queen recognised that there was some black magic behind Balruchi getting hurt. So, she also started performing magic to counter the spells of the old witch. The queen and the old witch had a magic battle, at which the old witch was defeated after which the king, queen and Balruchi returned to the palace.

Balruchi was again declared as the king's successor and the queen ordered to perform tantrik rituals every year for Balruchi's protection. The ritual was then adopted by the regular people too, who started performing them for the protection of their offspring and family.

== Performance ==
The dance is performed by the people of Mithila region of India and Nepal. The dance is performed every evening from the day of Ghatasthapana to Bijaya Dashami. It is believed that this dance is performed to protect one's children and society from witches. It is believed that the ritual was initiated to reduce the influence of the witches' magic upon one's family. Women dance with a clay pot on their head. Multiple holes are made inside the pot and a lamp is kept inside it. There is also a popular belief that if a witch succeeds in counting the holes in the pot placed on a woman's head, the dancing woman will die immediately.

View of clay pots having holes in them.

After dancing at a holy site on the first day of Dusshera, Jhijhiya formally begins. After the formal beginning of the Jhijhiya dance, there is a tradition of going from house to house and showing the dance. The dancers then ask the owner of the house for grains and food for the offering on the final day. On the day of Vijayadashami, final prayers are performed and the collected grains and money is used to organize a feast.

== Jhijhiya song ==
The dance has its own type of songs and rhythms. The dance is performed by rotating round and round at a fixed place while singing the Jhijhiya songs. The songs are accompanied by music from folk instruments such as Dhol, Manjira, etc. There are two types of songs sung while performing the dance. The first one is a song in praise of the goddess and the second song is sung for the protection against the witches and dark magic.

A verse of Jhijhiya song in Maithili language, with the English translation, is given below:

Tohare bharose Brahama Baba, Jhijhiya banailiai ho
Brahma Baba Jhijhari par hoinyoun asawar. (in Maithili)

[At your mercy, we observe Jhijhiya, Father Brahma!
Father Brahma, please come and be a part of it.] (English translation)

The women singing this song, remember the folk deity Brahma Baba of the village and pray for protection of her children and herself. The song begins with saying, "O Brahma Baba! We have built this Jhijhiya in your trust." The women further say, "We are foolish but your children. Please come on the jhijhari and protect us." The song is sung in the manner of dialogue with the folk deity.

== Influence ==
In 2024, the folk dance Jhijhiya of Mithila, was performed at the ceremony of the Republic Day in the National capital New Delhi of India. Similarly, it was also performed in the valley of Kathmandu in Nepal during the occasion of international festival of folk music in the city. In recent years, the popularity of the folk dance Jhijhiya has been increased. It has led to shaping women identities and empowering economically to the women of the Musahar community in the Mithila region.

The influence of the Maithili folk dance Jhijhiya is also extended to some other parts of India, North Bihar and Bhojpuri speaking areas.

== See also ==
- Sama Chakeva
- Chhath
- Deusi/Bhailo
