= Kirtilata =

Avahatta language poem composed by Vidyapati (1380 CE)

Kīrtilatā is a poem composed by the Maithili scholar Vidyapati in 1380 CE. It was composed in the Avahatta language. Narrating the conflict between the Sultan of Jaunpur Ibrahim Shah Sharqi & the Raja of Mithila Kirtisimha of the Oiniwar dynasty, it discusses the local conflicts between the Hindu and Muslim communities.

Below is the description of Hindus & Muslims living together in the city of Jaunpur

The Turks would exchange salams among themselves when they came to buy slaves in the market. They had purses, socks and other things with them. Mirs, Walis, wealthy people & Khwajas would roam around the market. There were innumerable Turks. Some drank alcohol, muttering Abbe, Ve ('Hey You!' in Hindusthani), some recited the kalma, some spoke qasida, some went to the mosque, some read books. There were innumerable Muslims. They call upon Khuda with reverence and consume a load of bhang. They get angry without any reason. They speak harshly. Their faces would turn as red as a heated copper vessel.

The Turk (soldier) would enter the market at noontime, take a round and extort from the people. He would look upon (Hindus) with side glances, runs & catch them in order to spit upon their faces. He would spend his entire money in alcohol & hot kebabs. I can't complain about his lack of intellect, for then he would chase me with his bodyguard. The Khan after seeking bhang for consumption, gets enraged. He says 'Bring me salan (side dishes in Hindusthani) immediately, or else I will rip open your chest'. After taking the first mouthful, he temporarily remains quiet, but then he starts abusing the (Hindu shopkeeper), uttering words like Gandu. He tries to kill him with his arrows. The Makhdum makes him sit down holding his hands. Even if you give him food smelling like camphor, he would shout uttering 'Onion! Onion!' (i.e he finds the food to be smelling like onions).

The damsel, skilled in the art of singing, starts to sing. The Turkish woman starts to dance, but nobody likes it. Sayyids, unchaste women & fakirs all eat each other's leftovers. The dervish utters dua, but goes away cursing of he doesn't gets anything (in alms). The Makhdoom goes around various house like a dome. I can't say about the (unjust) orders of the qadi, for then I will lose my wife.

Hindus and Turks live together, & mock each other's religion. Somewhere it is the adhan, somewhere it is recitation of the Vedas. somewhere it is the basmala, somewhere it is karnavedha. Somewhere live Ojha (a common surname of Maithili Brahmins), somewhere lives Khawaja. Somewhere it is nakta vrata (a Hindu ceremony where the votary fasts in the daytime & eats only after sunset), somewhere it is Roza. Somewhere it is copper vessels, somewhere it is earthen vessels. Somewhere it is namaz, somewhere it is Puja.

Sometimes the Turk would randomly catch a Hindu passersby & make him work without pay. If it happens to be the son of a brahmin, then he makes him carry a load of beef, cuts off his shikha, plucks off his janeu & tramples him under his horse. They drink rice wine & construct mosques over temples. They have filled the land with tombs & mausoleums (to such an extent) that there isn't space left for walking. They drive out the Hindus if they get their hands upon them. Even the children of the Turks have taken up to assaulting Hindus. Seeing the Turks, it appears that they are going to swallow the entire Hindu community. Such is the power of the Sultan, may he live long.

— Kirtilata, 2nd chapter
