= Vidyapati Nagar =

- Village
- Location within India
- Coordinates: 25.862931°N 85.781064°E
- Country: India
- State: Bihar
- District: Samastipur district
- Parliamentary constituency: Ujiarpur
- Assembly constituency: Sarairanjan
- Region: Mithila
- Named for: Vidyapati

Population (2011)
  - Total: 122,244
- Demonym: Maithil

Languages
  - Official: Hindi
  - Additional official: Urdu

Local language
  - Mother language: Maithili
- Time zone: UTC+5.30 (IST)
- PIN: 848503
- Area code: STD Code 06278
- Website: samastipur.bih.nic.in

Vidyapati Nagar is a village in the Samastipur district, in Bihar, India. It is named after the notable Maithili-language poet Vidyapati. Vidyapati Nagar is within the Darbhanga division of the district. It is famous as resting place of renowned Hindi poet Vidyapati.

== Location ==
Vidyapati Nagar is located 35 km south of the district headquarters of Samastipur and 82 km west of the state capital, Patna. Bachhwara and Mansurchak to the east of Vidyapati Nagar, with Dalsinghsarai lies to the north, and Mohiuddinagar to the west. The closest cities are: Dalsinghsarai, Barh, Mokameh and Mokama.

== Demographics ==
The local languages are Maithili, Urdu and Hindi. According to the 2011 census, the population was 122,244, with 51.8% male. The city contains 29 villages organized into 15 panchayats, for a total of 20,708 houses.
