= Gosaunik Ghar =

Worship room for Kuldevata and Kuldevi in Mithila region

- गोसाउनिक घर

Religion
- Affiliation: Hinduism; Worship Room
- Region: Mithila region

Location
- Location: Courtyards of Maithils
- Special worship room for Gosaun/Gosauni in the Mithila region

Gosaunik Ghar (Maithili: गोसाउनिक घर, pronounced [ɡɔsaʊnɪk ɡʱəɾ]) is special worship room of the Kuldevata or Kuldevi also called as Gosaun or Gosauni in the houses of Maithil people in the Mithila region of the Indian subcontinent. In the Mithila region Gosaun Devata or Gosauni Devi is worshipped in the houses of every Maithil people. In some auspicious day Maithil women sing some Maithili folk songs dedicated to these deities in their praise at the Gosaunik Ghar.

== Description ==
In the Mithila region, there is a tradition of Gosaunik Puja in every houses of the people of the Maithil communities. In their homes courtyards, they have special room for conducting the Gosaunik Puja to their Kuldevata or Kuldevi. This special holy worship room is known as Gosaunik Ghar. During the auspicious occasions like Upanayana, Mundana, marriage and Kojagra etc, the Maithil women sing local folk songs dedicated to the Gosaunik Puja called as Gosaunika Geet.

On the occasion of Deepawali in Mithila, first of all special worship is done in the Gosaunik Ghar of the Maithil family.
