= Gosaunik Geet =

Maithili folk song

"Gosaunik Geet" (Maithili)

Song by Maithili folk poets
- Language: Maithili
- Venue: Gosaunik Ghar
- Genre: Maithili folk devotional folk song

Gosaunik Geet (Maithili: गोसाउनिक गीत, pronounced [ɡɔsaʊnɪk ɡiːt̪]) are devotional folk songs sung in the Mithila region by Maithils through which they try to please their Kul Devi. It is sung during the auspicious occasions of Mundana, Upanayana and marriage, etc at the Gosaunik Ghar of Maithils. Vidyapati was one of the prominent Maithili poet who is credited for composing and singing the famous Gosaunik Geet "Jai Jai Bhairavi".

== Description ==
In the Mithila region, sanskar rituals of Maithils like Mundana and Upanayana, etc start with Gosaunik Geet. There are many Gosaunik Geets sung by Maithil women during some auspicious ceremonial days in their homes and families. The Maithili poet Vidyapati composed a very famous Gosaunik Geet having title "Jai Jai Bhairavi", which is sung during some cultural ceremonies and programs in the region.

"Jai - Jai Bhairavi Asura Bhayauni, Pashupati Bhamini Maya"

Maithili Version

"जय-जय भैरवी असुर भयाउनी, पशुपति भामिनी माया"

— Vidyapati, Jai Jai Bhairavi

The Gosaunik Geet is also called Bhagwati Vandana. The Maithili scholar cum Indian physicist Yogendra Pathak Viyogi compare the Gosaunik Geet "Jai Jai Bhairavi" for the Maithil community same as the national anthem song "Jana Gana Mana" serves for the national unity.
