= Belnati Beltodi =

Special ritual in Mithila during Durga Puja

Belnati Beltodi बेलनती बेलतोड़ी
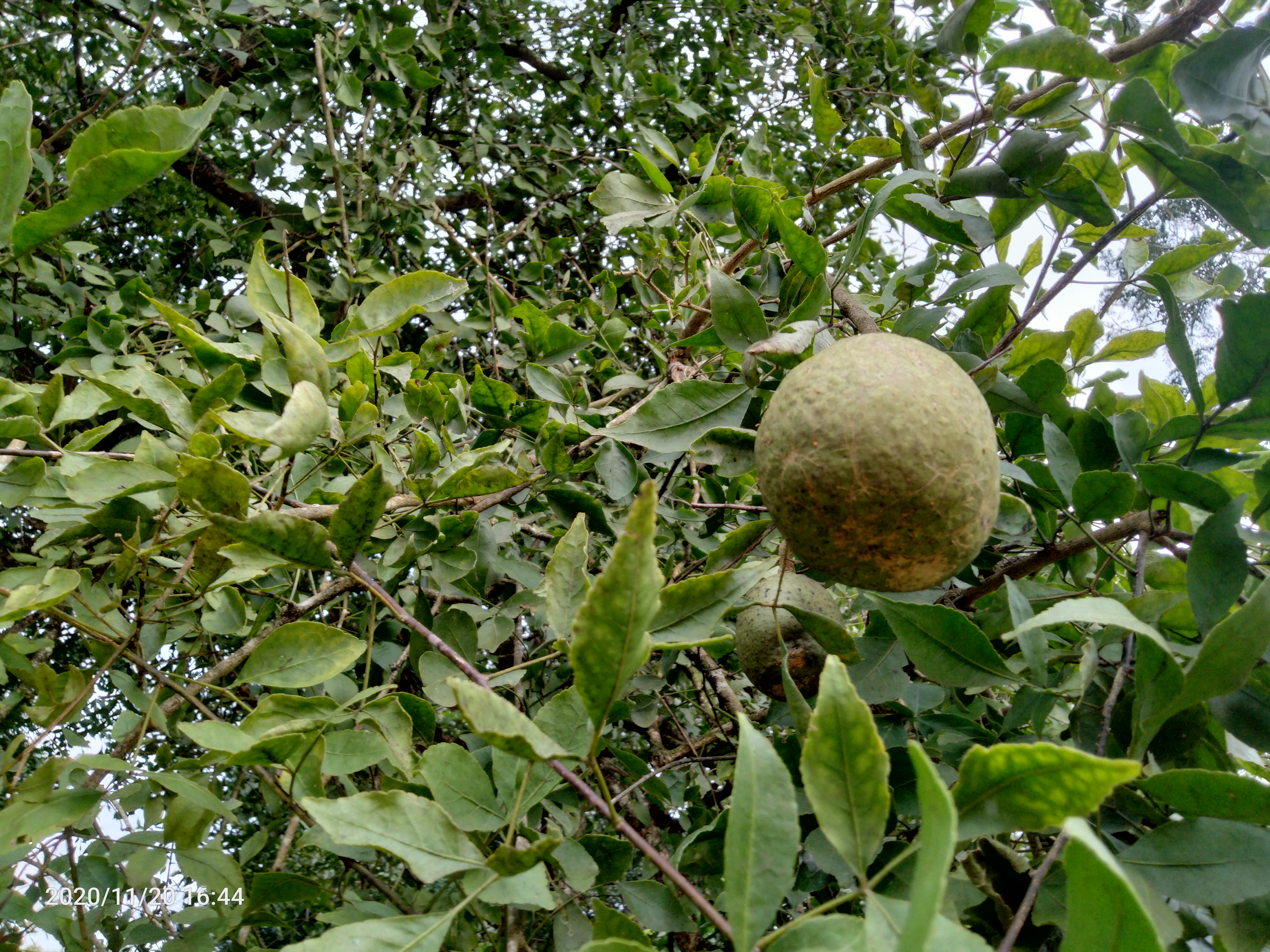
- View of Bel Tree
- Begins: Shashti (6th day of Durga Puja)
- Ends: Saptmi (7th day of Durga Puja)
- Venue: Bel Tree
- Location: Mithila region
- Country: India and Nepal

Belnati Beltodi (Maithili: बेलनती बेलतोड़ी) is a special ritual for worshiping to twin Bel fruits on a Bel tree during the Durga Puja festival in the Mithila region of the Indian Subcontinent.

== Etymology ==
Belnati also known as Belnyoti is a Maithili word which literally means invitation to the Bel tree. Similarly the literal meaning of Beltodi is plucking the Bel fruits.

== Description ==
In the villages of the Mithila region during the Durga Puja festival devotees with processions go to Bel tree at evening to invite it on the occasion of Shashti. The procession is known as Bel Aamantran Shobha Yatra. During the journey, some tableaus in the form of peacock, tiger, Shiva-Parvati and other deities are also taken out in the processions. The women in the processions sing songs dedicated to Goddess Bhagwati, during the journey. After reaching at the sacred Bēlapatra tree, it is worshipped with the religious materials by chanting Vedic Mantras. Then a pair of twin Bel fruits which believed to be sacred is identified and it is bound with a red religious cloth as a symbol of invitation. This process of ritual ceremony is locally known as Belnati. It is completed in the guidance of some Brahmin priests in the village.

Similarly in morning on the next day of shashti called as Saptami, the devotees with processions go to the Bel tree with decorated sedan for plucking the pair of the twin Bel fruits. This ritual process of plucking the twin Bel fruits is locally known as Beltodi. The twin Bel fruits are kept in the decorated sedan.

After the Beltodi ritual, the sedan is brought at the temple of Durga Puja. There the sacred twin Bel fruits are again worshiped and the eyes of the idol of the Goddess Durga in the temple is opened. Through the worship of the twin Bel fruits, Goddess Durga is given Pran-Pratishtha. This ritual process of opening the eyes of the Goddess Durga symbolises the transmission of goodness from the eyes of the goddess. And finally the covering on the face of the idol of the Goddess Durga in the puja pandals is removed for public exhibition. The ritual of opening eye of Goddess Durga on this occasion is known as Netra Jyoti Anusthan. In the mid night of the day, a sacred Nisha Puja ritual is performed at the Puja Pandals by the devotees.

== Legend ==
According to the legend in the region, it is believed that the goddess is enshrined in the twin Bel. Similarly, it is said that in the text Shiva Purana and other Hindu scriptures, the Bel (Bilva) tree is considered to be the form of Lord Shiva and Goddess Parvati. The goddess is invoked by tying yellow or red cloth to the twin Bel on the tree. The twin Bels are believed to be Lord Shiva and Goddess Parvati. After worshipping the Bael tree, the goddess enshrined in the twin Bel is brought to the temple in a decorated palanquin. According to adherents, it is believed that ghosts, spirits, and demons accompany the Goddess. Some foods are prepared for them. Then, at their distant abode, they are offered food with ritualistic worship. After this, the other urns, etc., are installed and ritualistic worship is performed in the temple. Then, all the deities in the temple are given new clothes and they are consecrated. Finally the door of the temple is opened for devotees.
