= Bhanusimha Thakurer Padabali =

Poetry anthology by Rabindranath Tagore

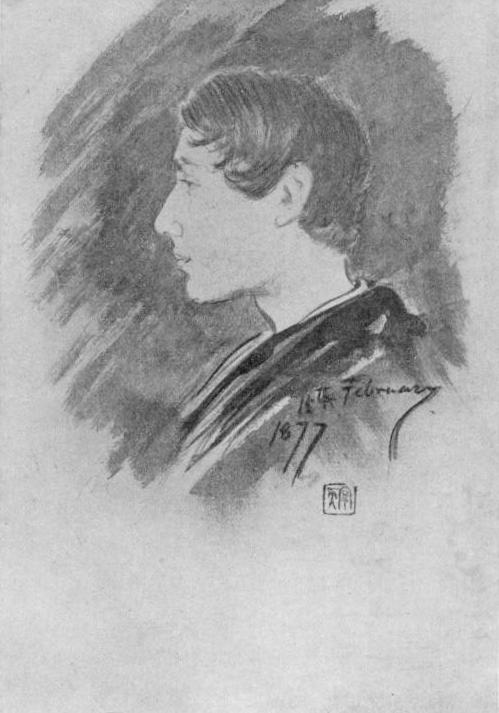
Rabindranath Tagore at the time he wrote the first "Bhanusimha" song, 1877. A sketch by Gaganendranath Tagore.

Bhanusimha Thakurer Padabali (Bengali: ভানুসিংহ ঠাকুরের পদাবলী, IPA: [bʰanuʃiŋho ʈʰakurer pɔd̪aboli]; lit. The Songs of Bhanushingho Thakur) is a collection of Vaishnava lyrics composed in Brajabuli by Rabindranath Tagore. It was published in 1884. These lyrics, which were earlier brought out in several issues of Bharati magazine, were first anthologized in 1884. Later, Tagore described composing these songs in his reminiscences Jiban Smriti. Rabindranath Tagore wrote his first substantial poems titled Bhanusimha Thakurer Padabali in Brajabuli under the pseudonym Bhānusiṃha at age sixteen. The anthology has 22 songs out of which only nine exists in Swarabitan (Vol. XXI), collection of notations of Tagore's music.

== Background ==
Young Tagore was attracted to the Maithili poems collected in Prachin Kavya Samgraha, edited by Akshay Chandra Sarkar and Sarada Charan Mitra. From Sarkar he learned of Thomas Chatterton, "a young boy who used to imitate the ancient poets". Inspired by this example, Tagore prepared himself to be a "second Chatterton". The first song "Gahana Kusumakunja-majhe" was probably composed in 1877. No manuscript survives, except of the song "Gabhir Needame Abasha Shyama Mama", which was probably written in Ahmedabad in 1878. It is difficult to put these songs in chronological order. Some songs, like "Marana Re, Tunhu Mama Shyamasamana", "Ko Tunhu Bolabi Moye" and "Aaju Sakhi Muhu Muhu" were composed much later.

Bhanusimha Thakurer Padavali was published on 1 July 1884. It was dedicated to Kadambari Devi, Tagore's sister-in-law who was eager to see the poems published, but committed suicide in April 1884.

== Theme ==
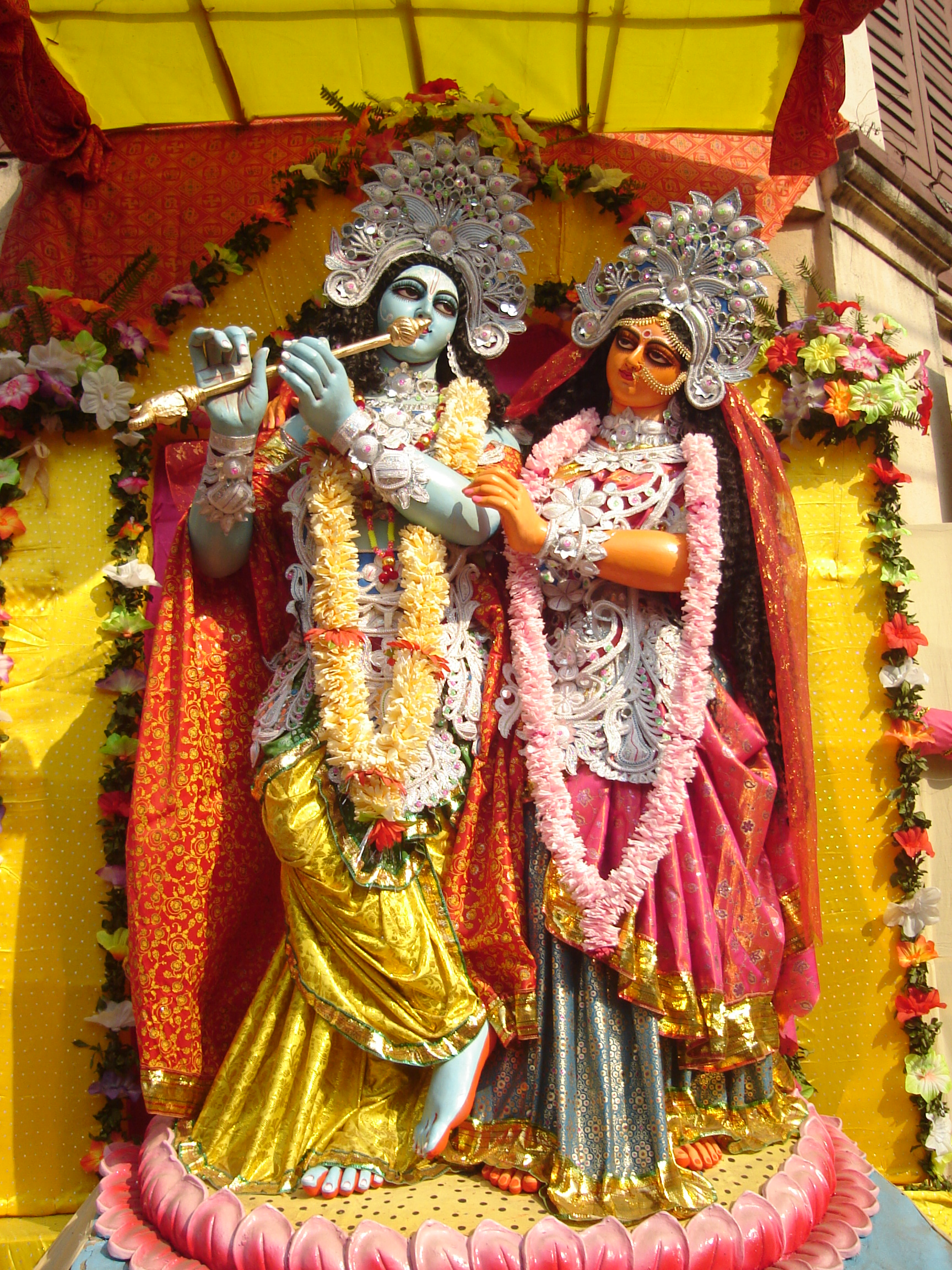
The Bhanusimha poems chronicle the romance between Radha and Krishna which is a traditional theme of Indian poetry.

The Bhanusimha poems chronicle the romance between Radha and Krishna which is a traditional theme of Indian poetry. The poet sought connection with divinity through appeal to nature and the emotional interplay of human drama. He repeatedly revised the poems over the following seventy years. Song VIII of Bhanusimha Thakurer Padavali:

গহন কুসুমকুঞ্জ-মাঝে মৃদুল মধুর বংশি বাজে, বিসরি ত্রাস-লোকলাজে সজনি, আও আও লো। পিনহ চারু নীল বাস, হৃদয়ে প্রণয়কুসুমরাশ, হরিণনেত্রে বিমল হাস, কুঞ্জবনমে আও লো॥ ঢালে কুসুম সুরভভার, ঢালে বিহগ সুরবসার, ঢালে ইন্দু অমৃতধার বিমল রজত ভাতি রে। মন্দ মন্দ ভৃঙ্গ গুঞ্জে, অযুত কুসুম কুঞ্জে কুঞ্জে, ফুটল সজনি, পুঞ্জে পুঞ্জে বকুল যূথি জাতি রে॥ দেখ সখি, শ্যামরায় নয়নে প্রেম উথল যায়, মধুর বদন অমৃতসদন চন্দ্রমায় নিন্দিছে। আও আও সজনিবৃন্দ, হেরব সখি শ্রীগোবিন্দ শ্যামকো পদারবিন্দ ভানুসিংহ বন্দিছে॥	Gahana kusumakunja-majhe mridula madhura bangshi baje, Bisari tras-lokalaje sajani, ao ao lo. Pinaha charu nila bas, hridaye pranayakusumarash, Harinanetre bimala has, kunjabaname ao lo. Dhale kusuma surabhabhar, dhale bihaga surabasar, Dhale indu amritadhar bimala rajata bhati re. Manda manda bhringa gunje, ayuta kusuma kunje kunje, Phutala sajani, punje punje bakula yuthi jati re. Dekha sakhi, Shyamaray nayane prem uthala jai, Madhura badana amritasadana chandramai nindichhe. Ao ao sajanibrinda, heraba sakhi Shri Govinda Shyamko padarabinda Bhanushingha bandichhe.

== Songs ==
Bhanusimha Thakurer Padavali has 22 songs altogether, which includes:

- "Boshonto aoulo re" ("বসন্ত আওল রে")
- "Shunoho shunoho balika" ("শুনহ শুনহ বালিকা")
- "Hridoyoko shadh mishaolo hridoye" ("হৃদয়ক সাধ মিশাওল হৃদয়ে")
- "Shyam re, Nipoto kothino mon tour" ("শ্যাম রে, নিপট কঠিন মন তোর")
- "Sajani sajani radhika lo" ("সজনি সজনি রাধিকা লো")
- "Bodhua, hiya 'por ao re" ("বঁধুয়া, হিয়া 'পর আও রে")
- "Shuna shokhi, bajoto bashi" ("শুন সখি, বাজত বাঁশি")
- "Gohono kushumokunjo-majhe" ("গহন কুসুমকুঞ্জ-মাঝে")
- "Shotimiro rojoni, shochokito shojoni" ("সতিমির রজনী, সচকিত সজনী")
- "Bojao re mouhan bashi" ("বজাও রে মোহন বাঁশি")
- "Aju shokhi, muhu muhu" ("আজু সখি, মুহু মুহু")
- "Shyam, mukhe tobo modhur odhorome" ("শ্যাম, মুখে তব মধুর অধরমে")
- "Shojoni ga" ("সজনি গো")
- "Badoroborokhono nirodogorojono" ("বাদরবরখন নীরদগরজন")
- "Modhobo, na koho adorobani" ("মাধব, না কহ আদরবাণী")
- "Shokhi lo, shokhi lo, nikoruno Madhob", ("সখি লো, সখি লো, নিকরুণ মাধব")
- "Bar bar shokhi, baron koronu" ("বার বার সখি, বারণ করনু")
- "Hom jobo na robo shojoni" ("হম যব না রব সজনী")
- "Morono re" ("মরণ রে")
- "Ko tuhu boulabi mouye" ("কো তুঁহু বোলবি মোয়")
- "Shokhi re, pirit bujhobe ke" ("সখিরে, পীরিত বুঝবে কে")
- "Hom shokhi darido nari" ("হম সখি দারিদ নারী")

The last song (that's in Swarabitan (no. 21) "Sundori Radhe Aowe Boni" ("সুন্দরি রাধে আওয়ে বনি") was written by poet Govindadas. Rabindranath composed the tune and later Indira Devi added the notations.
