= Vidyapati =

Indian poet, composer and writer

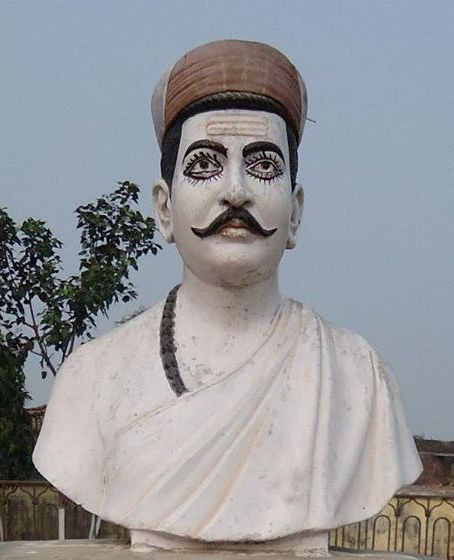
- Statue of Vidyapati at his birthplace known as Bisfi Vidyapati Dih.

Personal life
- Born: c. 1352 Bisfi (present-day Madhubani Bihar, India)
- Died: 1448 (aged 95–96) Vidyapati Dham, Vidyapati Nagar, Samastipur, Bihar
- Spouse: Shushila
- Parents: Ganpati Thakur (father); Hansini Devi (mother)

Religious life
- Religion: Hinduism
- Sect: Shaktism

Vidyapati (Maithili pronunciation: [ʋɪd̪jaːpəjt̪]; c. 1352–1448), also known by the sobriquet Maithil Kavi Kokil (lit. 'the poet cuckoo of Maithili'), was a Maithili and Sanskrit polymath-poet-saint, playwright, composer, biographer, philosopher, law-theorist, writer, courtier and royal priest. He was a devotee of Shiva, but also wrote love songs and devotional Vaishnava songs. He had knowledge of, and composed works in Sanskrit, Prakrit, Apabhramsha, and Maithili.

Vidyapati's influence was not just restricted to Maithili and Sanskrit literature but also extended to other Eastern Indian literary traditions. During Vidyapati’s time, the Prakrit-derived late Abahattha language was transitioning into early forms of Eastern Indo-Aryan languages such as Maithili. Thus, Vidyapati's influence on making these languages has been described as "analogous to that of Dante in Italy and Chaucer in England".

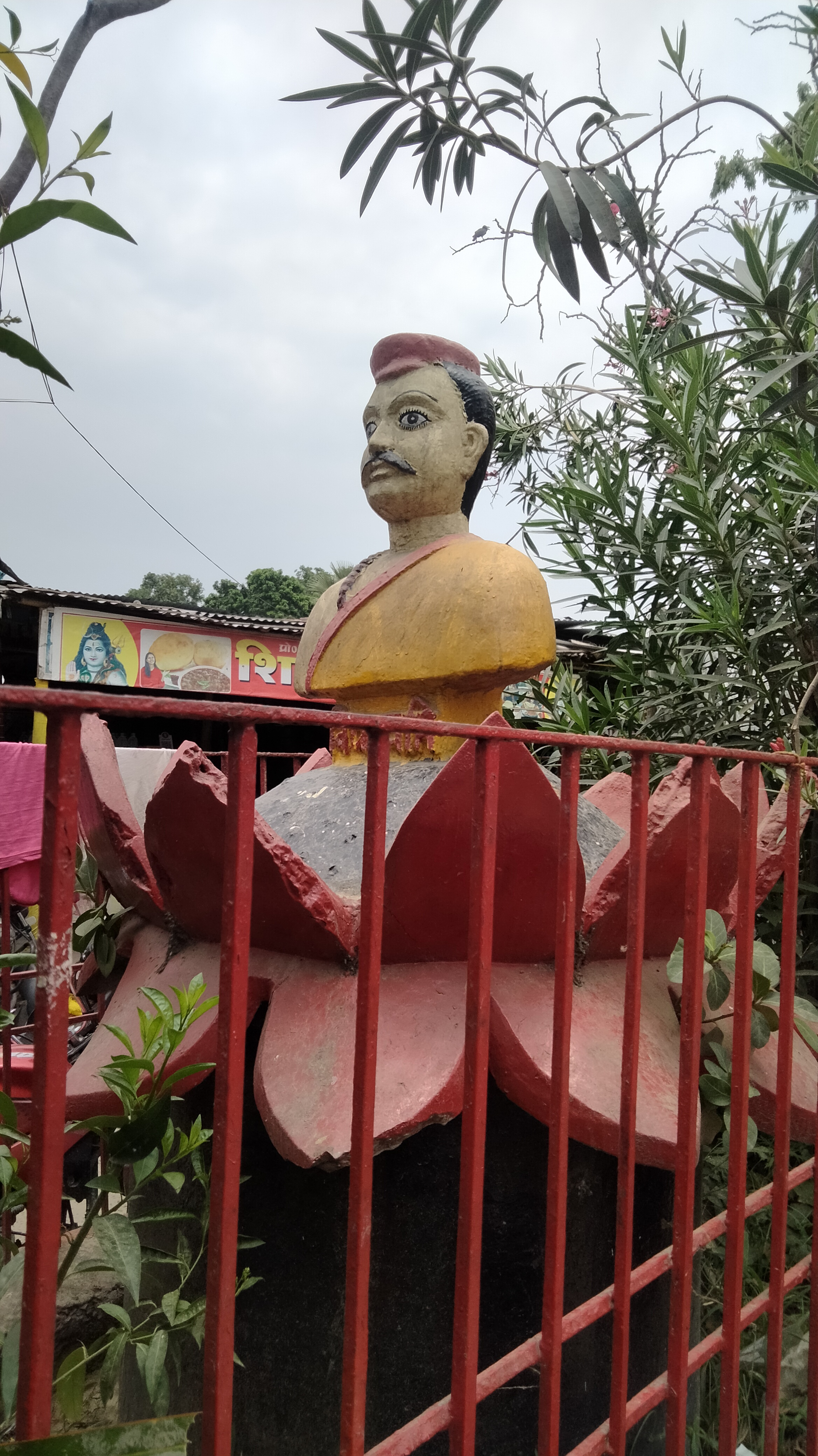
Memorial Statue of Vidyapati at the Machh Dwar entrance of the Uchchaith Bhagawati Mandir Complex

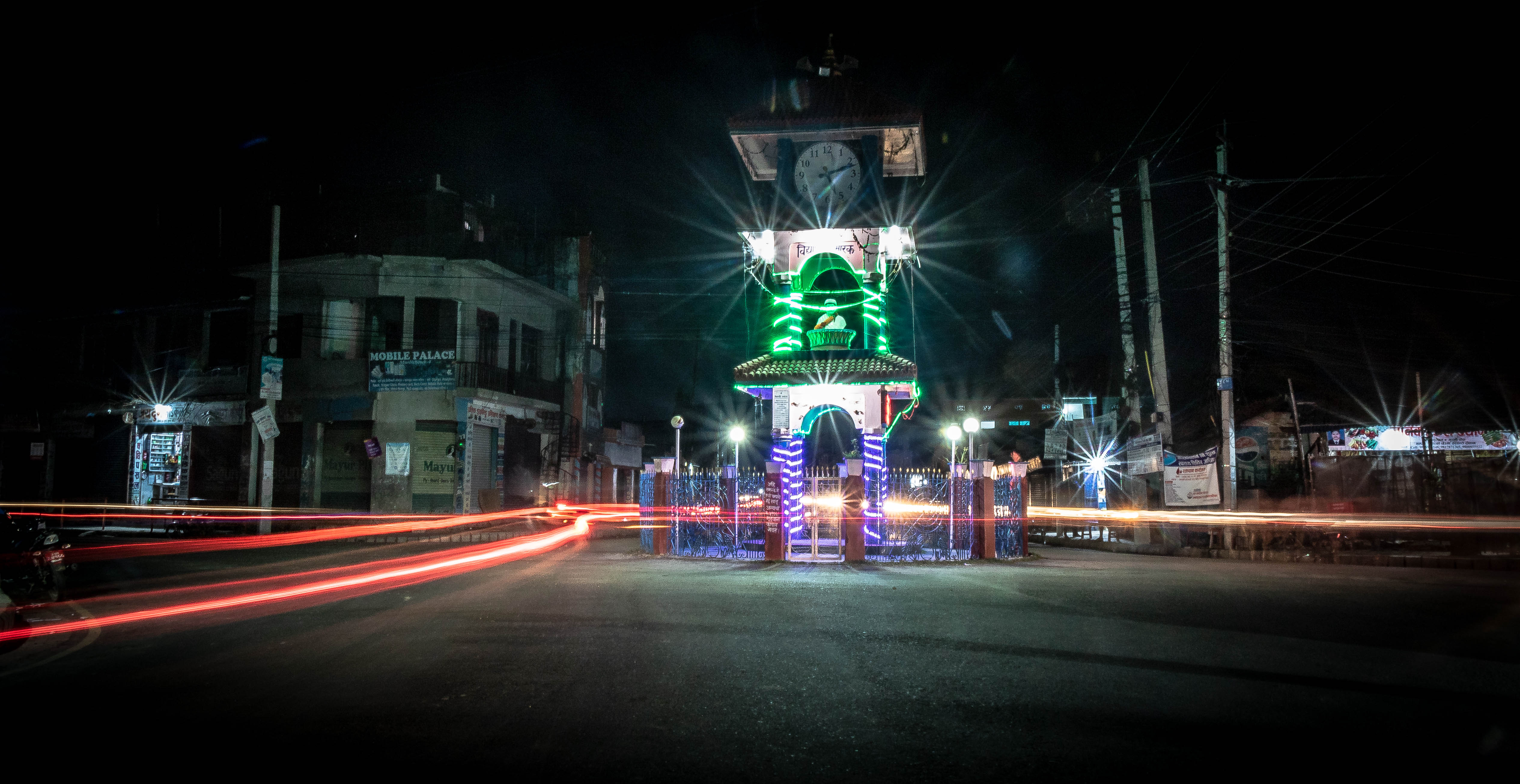
View of Vidyapati statue at the Vidyapati Chowk name after him in the city of Janakpur in Nepal.

== Early life ==
Vidyapati was born to a Maithil Brahmin family in the village of Bisapī (now Bisfi) in the present-day Madhubani district of the Mithila region of northern Bihar, India. The name Vidyapati ("master of knowledge") is derived from two Sanskrit words, vidya ("knowledge") and pati ("master"). There is confusion as to his exact date of birth due to conflicting information from his own works and those of his patrons.

The Vijipursha (earliest known ancestor) also called as Adi purusha (first known ancestors) of Vidyapati was Vishnu Thakur. Vidyapati was the son of Gaṇapati Ṭhakkura, a Maithil Brahmin said to be a great devotee of Shiva. His mother name was Hansini Devi. Vidyapati was married to Shushila. He was a priest in the court of Rāya Gaṇeśvara, the reigning chief of Tirhut. A number of his near ancestors were notable in their own right including his great-grandfather, Devāditya Ṭhakkura, who was a Minister of War and Peace in the court of Harisimhadeva.

== Later life ==
Vidyapati was heavily associated with the Oiniwar dynasty of Mithila and worked in the courts of seven Kings and two Queens of this dynasty. Vidyapati's first commission was by Kīrttisiṃha, who ruled Mithila from around 1370 to 1380. This led to the Kīrtilatā, a long praise-poem for his patron in verse. This work contains an extended passage praising the courtesans of Delhi, foreshadowing his later virtuosity in composing love poetry. Though Kīrttisiṃha didn't commission any more works, Vidyapati secured a position at the court of his successor, Devasimha. The prose story collection Bhūparikramaṇa was written under Devasimha's auspices. Vidyapati developed a close friendship with Devasimha's heir apparent Sivasimha and started focusing on love songs. He wrote some five hundred love songs, primarily between 1380 and 1406. The songs he composed after that period were devotional praises of Shiva, Vishnu, Durga, and Ganga.

There was a close friendship between Sivasimha, king of Mithila from 1402 to 1406, and Vidyapati. As soon as Sivasimha ascended to his throne, he granted Vidyapati his home village of Bisapi, an act recorded on a copper plate. On the plate, Sivasimha calls him "the new Jayadeva". The poet also accompanied his king to Delhi, at the sultan's demand. A story about that encounter relates how the king was held by the sultan and Vidyapati negotiated for his release by displaying his clairvoyant powers. Sivasimha's favourable patronage and the courtly environment encouraged Vidyapati's experiments in love songs written in Maithili, a language everyone at court could enjoy. In 1406, Sivasimha went missing in a battle with a Muslim army. After this defeat, Vidyapati and the court took refuge at a king's court in Rajabanauli(also known as Banauli), in modern-day Nepal. Lakhima Devi, the chief queen of Sivasimha, reigned for 12 years. After that, Padmasimha became the ruler of Mithila. Vidyapati returned to serve Padmasimha at Padma village (the capital of the King Padmasimha) and continue writing, primarily treatises on law and devotional manuals.

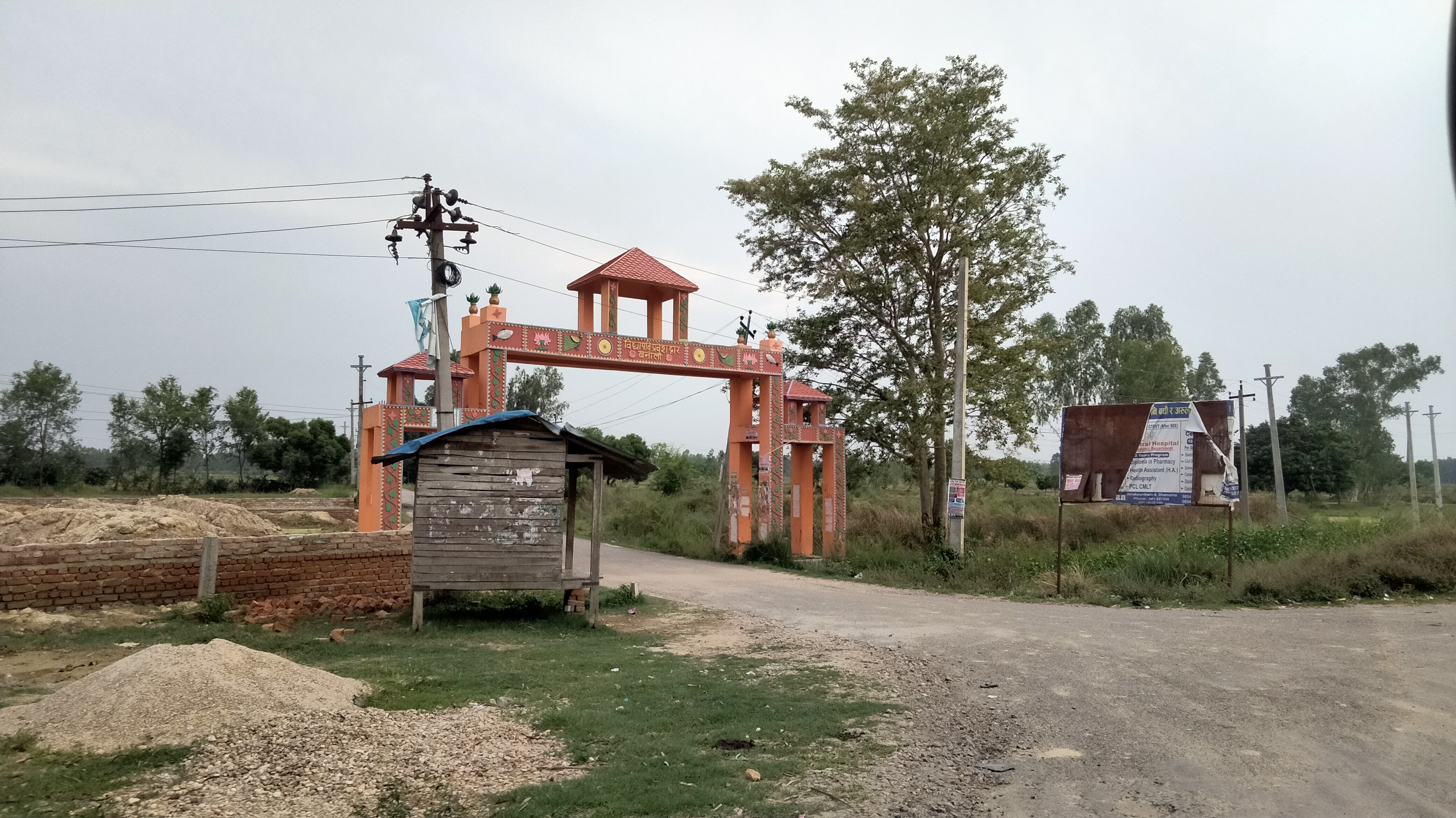
Entry gate named Vidyapati Pravesh Dwar in the honor of the poet Vidyapati at Banauli village near Janakpur city

At about 1430 or earlier, he is known to have returned to his village, Bisapi. He often visited its temple of Shiva.

He is recorded as having two wives, three sons and four daughters.

== Political career ==
The independence of the kings Vidyapati worked for was often threatened by incursions by Muslim sultans. The Kīrttilatā makes reference to an incident where the Oiniwar King, Raja Gaṇeśvara, was killed by the Turkish commander, Malik Arsalan in 1371. By 1401, Vidyapati requested the help of the Jaunpur Sultan in overthrowing Arsalan and installing Gaṇeśvara's sons, Vīrasiṃha and Kīrttisiṃha, on the throne. With the Sultan's assistance, Arsalan was deposed and Kīrttisiṃha, the oldest son, became the ruler of Mithila.

The conflicts of his time are evident in his works. In his early praise-poem Kīrttilatā, he slyly criticises his patron for his perceived deference to Muslims.

== Love songs ==
While working under his second patron, Devasimha, and especially under his successor Sivasimha, Vidyapati started composing Maithili songs of the love of Radha and Krishna. He seems to have only composed love songs between 1380 and 1406, though he kept writing until near his death in 1448. He seems to have ceased writing love songs after his patron and friend Sivasimha went missing in a battle and his court had to go into exile. These songs, which would eventually number five hundred, broke with convention. They were written in vernacular Maithili as songs, not as formal poems in literary Sanskrit as was done before. Until Vidyapati, Maithili wasn't employed as a literary medium.

He applied the tradition of Sanskrit love poetry to the "simple, musical, and direct" Maithili language. His inheritance from the Sanskrit tradition include its repertory of standard images to describe beauty ("eyes large and tender like a doe's") and standard settings to invoke certain moods and feelings (spring with its increasing heat as an analogy for rising passion). Vidyapati also drew from the beauty of his home in Madhubani ("forest of honey"), with its mango groves, rice fields, sugar cane, and lotus ponds.

In the tradition of Jayadeva's Gita Govinda, Vidyapati's songs were simultaneously praises of love-making and praises of Krishna; praise of Krishna involved praise of love-making. The intensity and poetic virtuosity of the songs were integral to these songs' function as a way to directly worship god and earn spiritual merit. Vidyapati's continuation of Jayadeva's program in a different language earned him the title "the new Jayadeva". His work did differ from his predecessor's in two ways. His songs were independent from one another unlike the Gita Govinda, which comprises twelve cantos telling an overarching story of the couple's separation and reunion. While Jayadeva wrote from Krishna's perspective, Vidyapati preferred Radha's; "her career as a young girl, her slowly awakening youth, her physical charm, her shyness, doubts and hesitations, her naive innocence, her need for love, her surrender to rapture, her utter anguish when neglected – all of these are described from a woman's point of view and with matchless tenderness."

These songs frequently mention the queens of king Sivasimha, an indicator that they were meant to be enjoyed by the court. At times, his poems identify Krishna with king Sivasimha and Radha with the king's chief queen, Lakhima Devi. They were sung by a court singer, Jayati, who sent the songs to music. They were learned by dancing girls and eventually spread out of the court.

His love songs have been collected into the Padāvalī, probably not by Vidyapati himself.

== Devotional songs ==
Though he wrote hundreds of love songs about the romance of Radha and Krishna, he was not a special devotee of Krishna or Vishnu. Instead, he lavished attention on Shiva and Durga but also wrote songs about Vishnu and Ganga. He is particularly known for his songs of the love of Shiva and Parvati and prayers for Shiva as the supreme Brahman.

A song titled All My Inhibition:

All my inhibition left me in a flash,
When he robbed me off my clothes,
But his body became my new dress.
Like a bee hovering on a lotus leaf
He was there in my night, on me!

Shiva and Parvati Hymns:

Vidyapati's deep devotion to Lord Shiva is evident in his compositions that explore the divine relationship between Shiva and Parvati. These works are characterised by their poetic elegance and spiritual depth, reflecting the poet's reverence for the divine couple.

Gosaunik Geet: "Jai Jai Bhairavi" :

Among Vidyapati's notable devotional songs is "Jai Jai Bhairavi," a Gosaunik Geet dedicated to Goddess Bhairavi. This composition is traditionally sung during auspicious ceremonies in the Mithila region, highlighting the poet's influence on regional devotional practices.

== Influence ==
=== Odia literature ===
Vidyapati's influence reached Odisha through Bengal. The earliest composition in Brajabuli, an artificial literary language popularised by Vidyapati, is ascribed to Ramananda Raya, the governor of Godavari province of the King of Odisha, Gajapati Prataprudra Dev. He was an associate of Chaitanya Mahaprabhu. He recited his Brajabuli poems to Chaitanya Mahaprabhu, when he first met him on the bank of river Godavari at Rajahmundry, southern provincial capital of Kingdom of Odisha.

=== Bengali literature ===
Bengali Vaishnavas like Chaitanya and Chandidas adopted Vidyapati's love songs about Radha and Krishna as Vaishnava hymns. All major Bengali poets of the medieval period were influenced by Vidyapati. As a result, an artificial literary language, known as Brajabuli was developed in the sixteenth century. Brajabuli is basically Maithili (as prevalent during the medieval period) but its forms are modified to look like Bengali. The medieval Bengali poets, Gobindadas Kabiraj, Jnandas, Balaramdas and Narottamdas composed their padas (poems) in this language. Rabindranath Tagore composed his Bhanusingha Thakurer Padabali (1884) in a mix of Western Hindi (Braj Bhasha) and archaic Bengali and named the language Brajabuli as an imitation of Vidyapati (he initially promoted these lyrics as those of a newly discovered poet, Bhanusingha). Other 19th-century figures in the Bengal Renaissance like Bankim Chandra Chatterjee have also written in Brajabuli.

Tagore was much influenced by Vidyapati. He set the poet's Bhara Badara to his own tune.

== Legacy ==
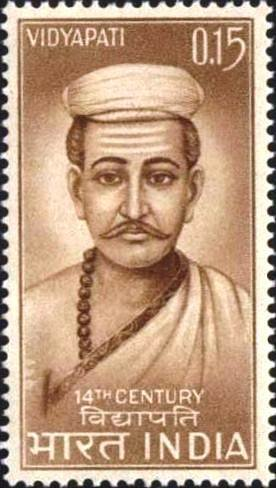
1965 Postage Stamp

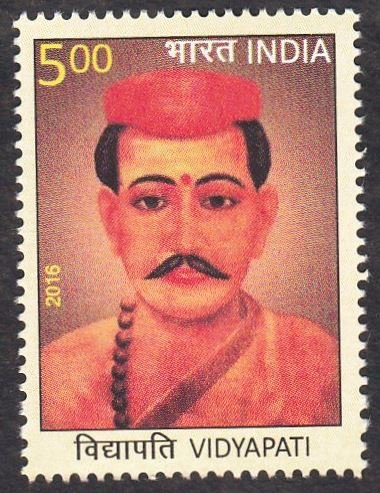
Postal stamp issued by the Government of India in recognition of Vidyapati

Vidyapati has been kept alive in popular memory over the past six centuries; he is a household name in Mithila. His love songs are sung at weddings in the region. Many myths have arisen about him and people continue to sing his songs.

Vidyapati Jayanti

=== Bidāpat Nāch ===
A form of folk dance-drama street theatre, Bidāpat Nāch, where "bidāpat" is derived from "Vidyapati", is performed in Purnia district in north Bihar. While several groups performed in multiple villages in that area in the 20th century, there was just one group left in one village by 2012.

=== In mythology ===
Vidyapati's life has been mythologised in different ways. Many of his admirers ascribe miracles to him and detail his interaction with the gods. Among these stories is one which details that Shiva came down to earth to speak with Vidyapati after being impressed with his piety. This incarnation of Lord Shiva is known as Ugna. Ugna served as the servant of the poet Vidyapati.

Another story exists involving him and the Goddess Ganga. When his death was imminent, he decided to go to the river Ganga, but was too tired to continue just a few miles away. He resolves that if his piety was pure, the river would come to him. And so it happens. The goddess obliges and the river rises to let him take a final dip in holy waters. At some point in the past, the town where this is believed to have happened was renamed Vidyapati Nagar ("town of Vidyapati") and a Shiva temple called as Vidyapati Dham was built there.

=== In popular culture ===
Pahari Sanyal played Vidyapati in the 1937 Bengali film Vidyapati, which received a lot of appreciation. The film starred Prithviraj Kapoor as King Shiva Singha of Mithila. Another film, also titled Vidyapati, was made in 1964 by Prahlad Sharma, starring Bharat Bhushan and Simi Garewal in the lead roles.

In December 2018, Darbhanga Airport was renamed Kavi Kokil Vidyapati Airport.

=== Banauli Vidyapati Dih ===
In the Himalayan nation of Nepal, there is a historical dih named after him at Banauli village of the Mithila region. It is known as Banauli Vidyapati Dih. The location of the historical dih has been declared as a tourist destination by the Madhech Pradesh provincial government of Nepal. It is also considered as the location of the court of King Puraditya in the Dronwara dynasty of the Raj Banauli in Mithila.

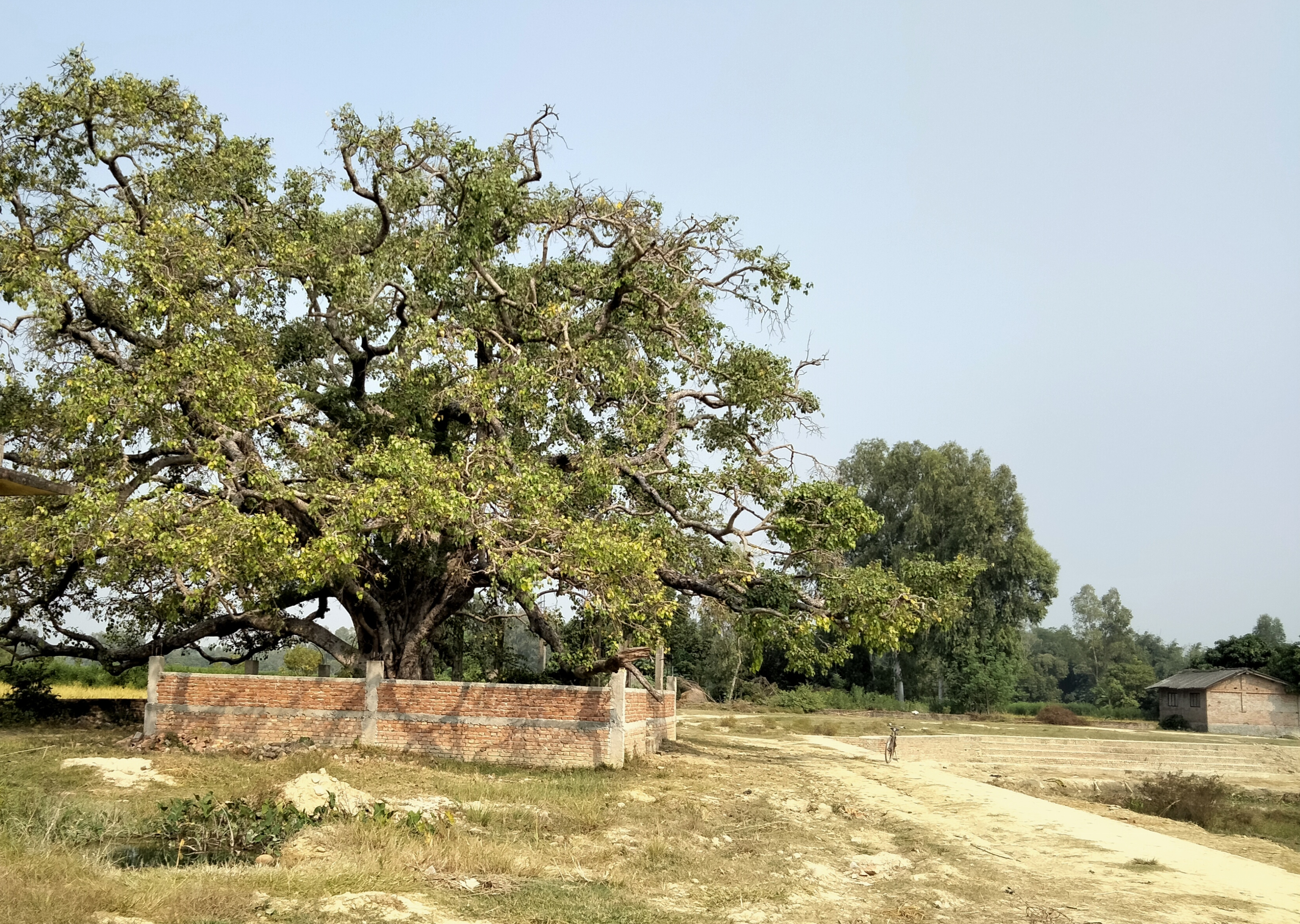
The sacred peepal tree at the Banauli Vidyapati Dih.

== Works ==
=== Texts ===
- Maṇimañjarīnāṭikā (Sanskrit, Tirahuta script) – a conventional romantic play (nāṭikā)
- Bhūparikramaṇa ("around the world", Sanskrit, Devanagari script) – a collection of eight prose stories set in different locales
- Kīrttilatā (Avahaṭṭha, Devanagari script) – Kirtilata is a praise-biography in verse detailing the victory of Vidyapati's patron Kirttisimha's over his rival Malik Arsalan of the Jaunpur Sultanate composed in the Sanskrit genre ākhyāyikā.
- Puruṣaparīkṣā (Sanskrit, Devanagari script) – The Purushapariksha is a treatise on political ethics and ideal masculinity, composed broadly in the Sanskrit kathā genre.
- Gorakṣavijaya (Sanskrit, Prakrit, and Maithili; Mithilākṣara script) – a musical play about the Natha saint Gorakṣanātha rescuing his teacher Matsyendranātha from a worldly life back to the life of a yogi
- Kīrttipatākā (Avahaṭṭha, Tirahutā script) – a partially-extant praise-biography in verse for another of Vidyapati's patrons, Sivasimha.
- Harikeli (Avahaṭṭha, Tirahutā script) – a partially-extant allegorical love play between Krishna and the Gopis, with Raya Arjuna/Jagat Simha (a cousin of Sivasimha) as protagonist.
- Likhanāvalī (Sanskrit, Devanagari script) – a manual for scribes, with model letters, business documents, and affidavits
- Śaivasarvasvasāra (Sanskrit; one manuscript in Mithilākṣara script, two in Devanagari) – describes the significance and merits of worshipping Shiva, with proscribed rituals, citing extensively from the Puranas.
- Gaṅgāvākyāvalī (Sanskrit) – a text glorifying the religious significance of Ganga, with citations from the Puranas.
- Vibhāgasāra (Sanskrit, Tirahuta script) – a dharmaśāstra focusing on Hindu property law, with citations from many Smritis.
- Dānavākyāvalī (Sanskrit, Devanagari script) – a guide to types of ritual donations and their spiritual merits
- Durgābhaktitaraṅgiṇī (Sanskrit, Devanagari script) – a manual for the observance of Durga Puja.
- Gayāpattalaka (Sanskrit, Devanagari script) – a text about funerary rituals to be performed at Gaya.
- Varṣakṛtya (Sanskrit) – a text describing the festivals that are to be observed through the year (probably the festivals that were observed in Mithila at that time).
- Padāvalī (Maithili, Tirahuta/Bangla/Devanagari scripts depending on version) – a compilation of Vidyapati's songs in praise of Krishna composed in Brajabuli, likely not put together by him.

=== Translations ===
His works have been translated to several languages, including English. Vidyapati's love songs were translated into English as part of the UNESCO Collection of Representative Works.

== Bibliography ==
- Coomaraswamy, Anand, ed. (1915), VIDYĀPATI: BANGĪYA PADĀBALI (PDF), London: The Old Bourne Press
