= Brajabuli =

Artificial literary language based on Maithili

- ব্রজবুলি
- Created by: Vidyapati
- Date: 16th century
- Extinct: unknown
- Purpose: Constructed language: Indo-Iranian; Indo-Aryan; Eastern Zone (Magadhan); Maithili and Bengali; Brajabuli
- Writing system: Bangla, Tirhuta

Language codes
- ISO 639-3: None (mis)
- Glottolog: None

Brajabuli is an artificial literary language popularized by the Maithili poet Vidyapati. His Brajabuli lyrics about the love for Radha Krishna is considered to his best of works. Other poets emulated his writing, and the language became established in the 16th century. Among the medieval Bengali poets who wrote in Brajabuli are Narottama Dasa, Balarama Das, Jnanadas, and Gobindadas Kabiraj.

Rabindranath Tagore also composed his Bhanusimha Thakurer Padavali (1884) in this language (he initially promoted these lyrics as those of a newly discovered poet, Bhanusingha). Other 19th century figures in the Bengal Renaissance, such as Bankim Chandra Chattopadhyay, have also written in Brajabuli. The extant Brajabuli literature consists of about 5,000 poems.

Brajabuli is basically Maithili (as prevalent during the medieval period), but its forms are modified to look like Bengali.

== See also ==
- Brajavali dialect – another literary language based on Maithili
