= Maladhar Basu =

Maladhar Basu (Bengali: মালাধর বসু; c. 15th century) was a Bengali poet. He wrote Sri Krishna Vijaya (শ্রীকৃষ্ণবিজয়, Triumph of Lord Krishna), the earliest Bengali narrative poem that can be assigned to a definite date. It is also the oldest Bengali narrative poem of Krishna legend. It was composed between 1473 and 1480. The long poem is a translation of the 10th and 11th cantos of the Bhagavata Purana; a part of Vishnu Purana and the story of Ramayana is also incorporated here.

== Biography ==
Maladhar Basu was born in a Bengali Kulin Kayastha family at Kulingram village of modern-day Purba Bardhaman district, Paschimbanga (West Bengal) to Bhagirath Basu and Indumati Devi. Maladhar Basu was a scholar of Sanskrit literature and Vaishnava theology. He translated the famous Sanskrit work Bhagavata into Bengali language, under the patronage of Nusrat Shah, then ruler of Bengal.

In his Sri Krishna Vijaya, composed in Middle Bangla, Maladhar Basu focuses on the divine life of Krishna, with the tenth canto recounting Krishna’s childhood legends and his divine play with the gopis in Vrindavana. He was honoured by Rukunuddin Barbak Shah with the title 'Gunaraj Khan'.
