= Chandidas =

Famous Bengali Poet of Medieval India

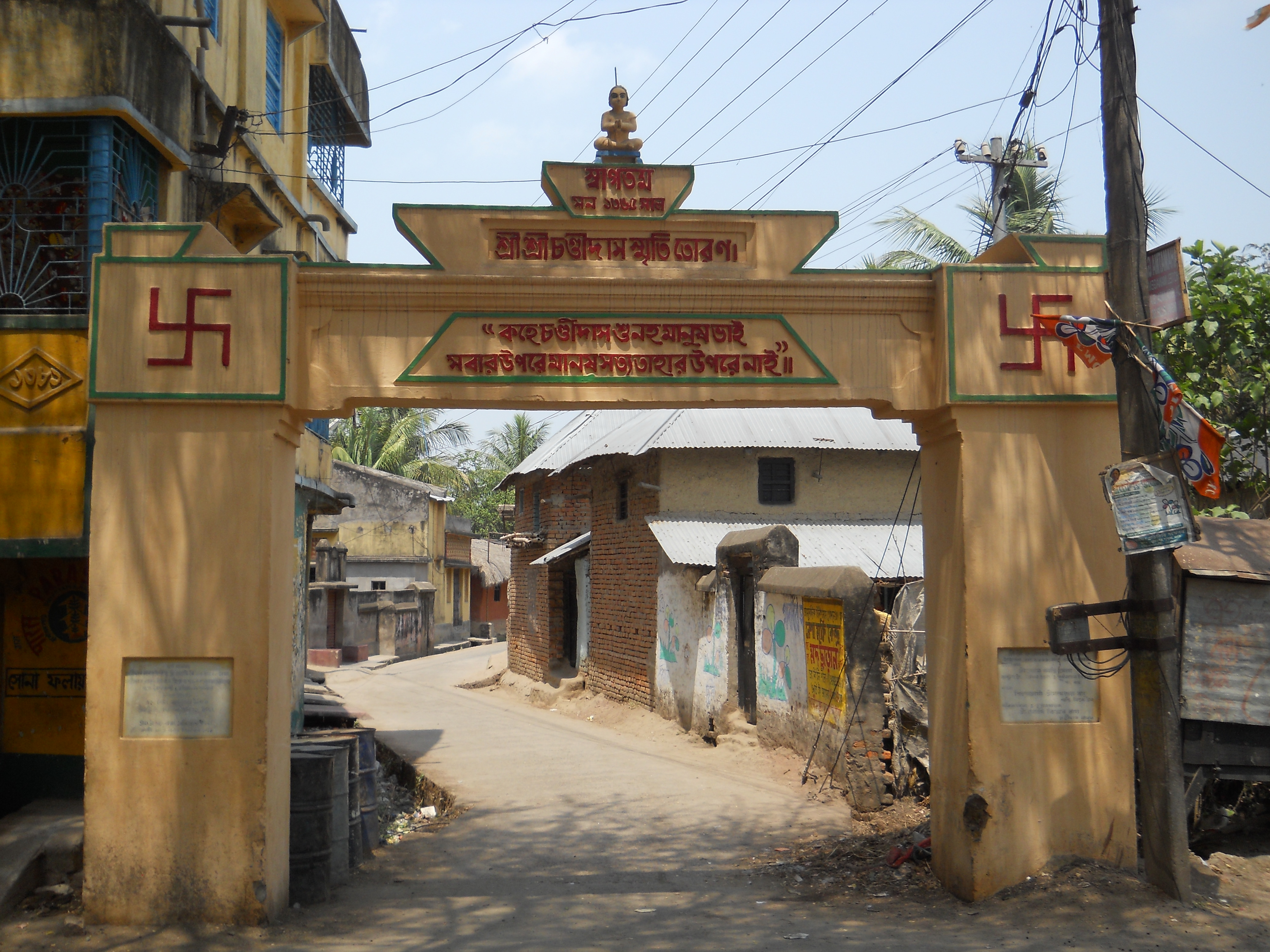
Way to Chandidas Bhita at Nanoor

Chandidas (1339–1399) was a medieval Bengali poet, or possibly more than one. He wrote over 1250 poems related to the love of Radha and Krishna in medieval Bengali. The poems of Chandidas with bhanita are found with three different sobriquets along with his name, Baḍu, Dvija and Dina as well as without any sobriquet also. It is not clear whether these bhanitas actually refer to the same person or not. It is assumed by some modern scholars that the poems which are current in the name of Chandidas are actually the works of at least four different Chandidas, who are distinguished from each other by their sobriquets found in the bhanitas. It is also assumed that the earliest of them was Ananta Baḍu Chandidas. His father Durgadas Bagchi, was a Bengali Brahmin of Barendra clan. Baḍu Chandidas has been more or less identified as a historical figure, born in the 14th century in a Bengali Brahmin family of a small Tehsil city named Nanoor in Birbhum district of the present-day West Bengal state and wrote the lyrical Srikrishna Kirtan (Songs in praise of Krishna).

== Srikrishna Kirtan ==
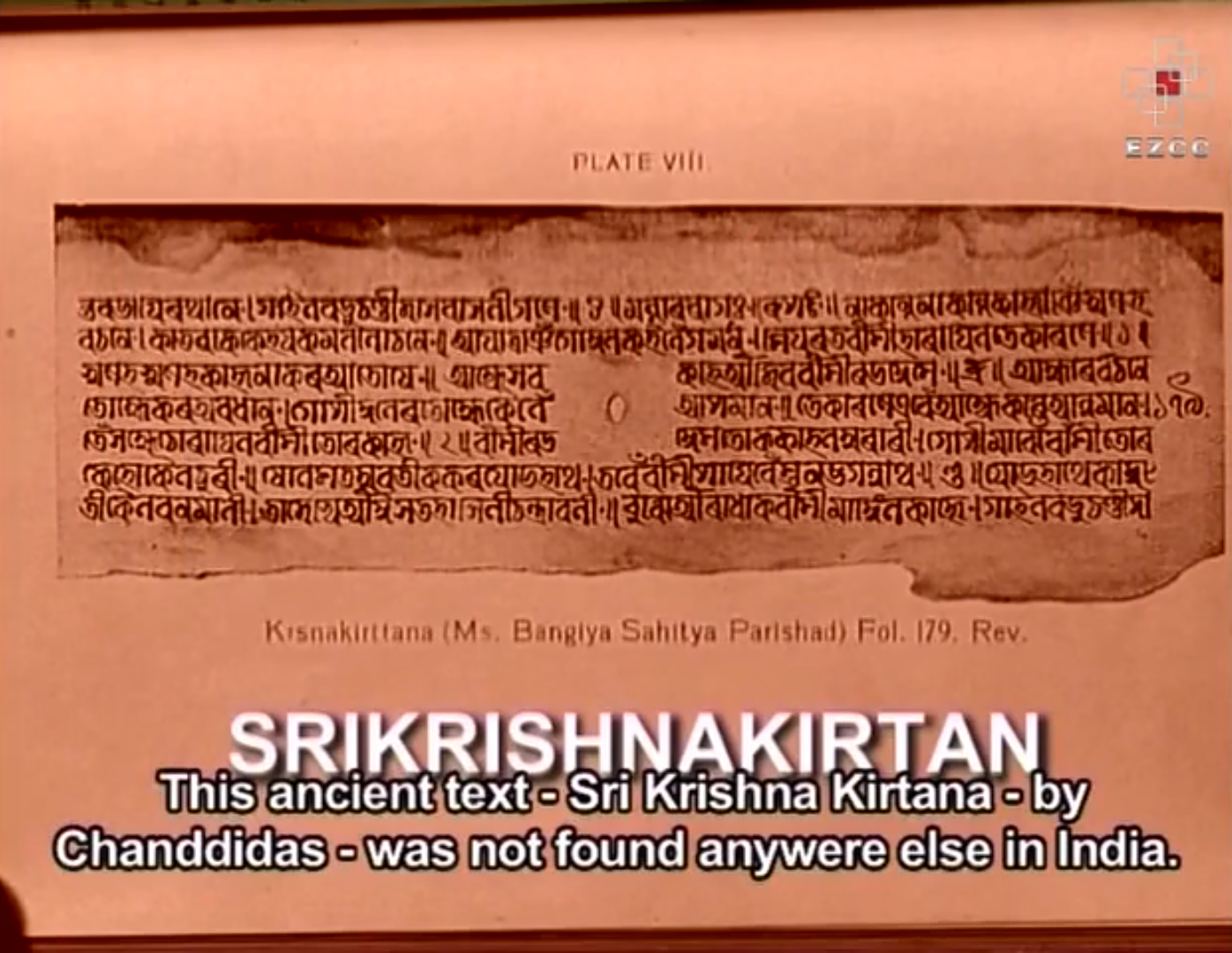
Shreekrishna Kirtana By Chandidas from Mallabhum kingdom

In 1916, the Bangiya Sahitya Parishad published the manuscript of the Srikrishna Kirtan discovered by Basanta Ranjan Roy Bidwatballabh at Bankura. The Srikrishna Kirtan, as its name suggests, narrates the story of Krishna and his companion Radha. The storyline is derived from Shrimad Bhagavatam. However, Baru Chandidas managed to add substantial originality, making it a masterpiece of medieval Bengali literature. He is considered to be a prominent Early Middle Bengal poet, however the date of his poem Srikrsnakirtana is still under question, while the text remains one of the most important evidences of early portrayal of the popular story of "Lord Krishna's love for the cowherd girl Radha". The 412 songs of Srikrsnakirtana are divided into thirteen sections that represent the core of the Radha-Krsna legendary cycle, with many variants providing excellent comparative material. The manuscript clearly suggests that the songs meant to be song, and implies particular ragas for the recitation. There is a considerable debate as to the authenticity of the text that has significant religious meaning.

== Humanism ==
According to Banglapedia, Chandidas was the first Bengali-language poet to be a humanist. He asserted "Shobar upor manush shotto tahar upore nai" ("Above all is humanity, none else"). Later literature has also often eulogized Chandidas' love for a Rajakini (a female cloth washer), whether this has any historical basis is not known.

== See also ==
- Gaudiya Vaishnavism
- Vaishnava-Sahajiya
- Bengal
- Chaitanya Mahaprabhu
- Jayadeva Goswami
- Radha Krishna
