= Dibyak =

Minister in the Pala Court and the leader of Varendra Rebellion

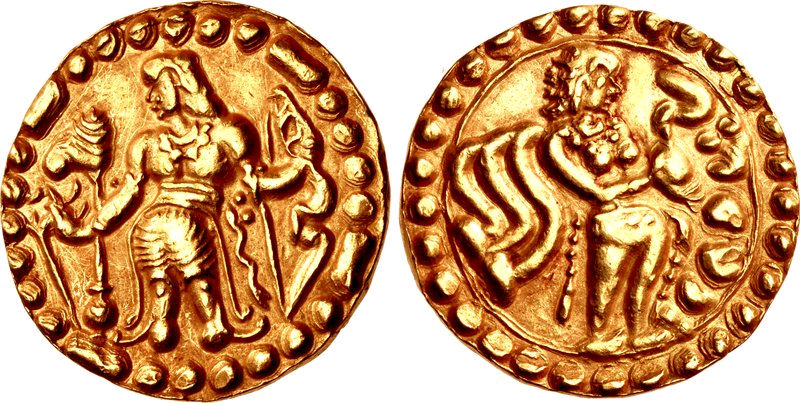
- Reign: 1075-1082CE
- Successor: Bhima
- Religion: Hinduism

Dibyak (or Divyak) was a Samanta and the leader of the Varendra rebellion against the Pala Dynasty in North Bengal during the reign of King Mahipala II. He led a significant uprising that challenged the authority of the ruling Pala Empire.

== Dynasty ==
=== Origin ===
According to SP. Lahiri, Dibyak was the 5th or 6th descendant of Yasodasa, the king of the feudal Dasa dynasty under the Pala's, who served as Prime minister of Emperor Rajyapala. Yasodāsa's ancestors Malhadāsa, Suradāsa, and Sanghadāsa were important members, were known for their wealth and prowess, and were Mahishya by caste. When Yasodas was the prime minister, the king commanded allegiance with Anga, Vanga, Kalinga, Suhma, Pandya, Karnata, Gurjara etc. Yasodasa is said to have performed many humanitarian and religious activities in the form of excavation of tanks, construction of temples, monasteries, palaces and bridges etc. According to the Bhaturiya inscription of King Rājyapāla, Auamitla in Brhaddhatta is mentioned as the locality of the Dasa family resided. The precise location of these places remains uncertain, though they were likely situated not far from the site of the inscription, presumably in North Bengal.

=== Relation with Palas ===
Maternally, Dibyak was a blood relation of the Pala dynasty. This explains his extremely high position in the imperial Pala court, be even enjoyed royal fortune to certain extent in his tenure as the Pala commander-in-chief. In Ramcharita poet Sandhyakar Nandi mentioned that Dibyak was a high official under the Pala king Mahipala II.

"Māṃsabhujā lakṣmyā āmiṣaṃ bhuñjānena bhṛtyenoccair-daśakenoccair-mahatī dāsā vasthā yasyati — uccabhṛto'rthaḥ"

— Sandhyakar Nandi, Ramcharitam

== Rebellion ==
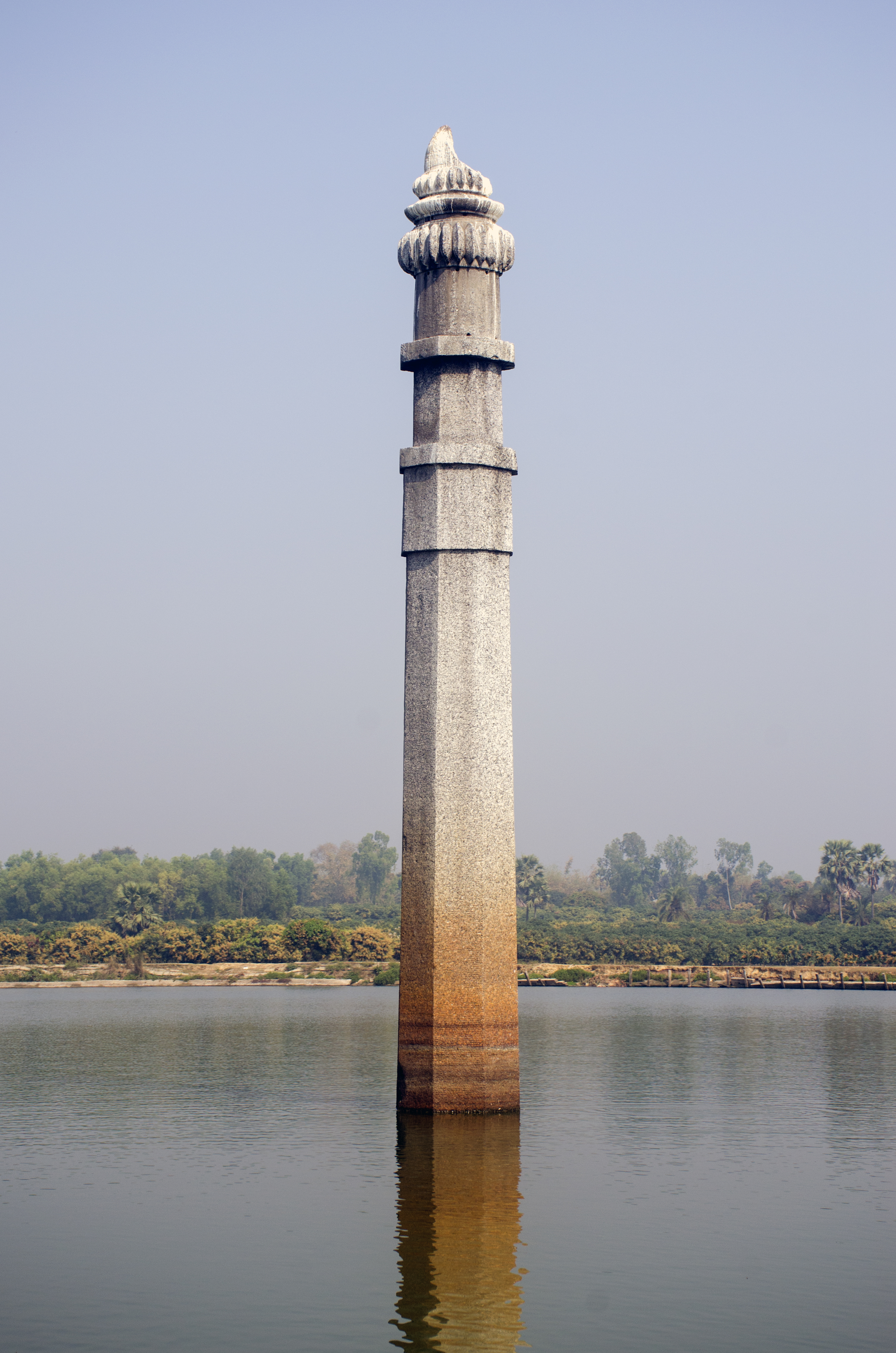
Dibyok Stambha

In the beginning of the eleventh century, in a rebellious hostility, Divya(Dibyak), originally a feudal chief (Samanta), killed Mahipala II, seized Varendra and established a regime there, which was ruled by him, his brother Rudok and nephew Bhima for around half a century.

Vigrahapāla III had three sons,—Mahipala II, Šūrapāla II, and Rāmapāla. Mahīpāla II succeeded his father about 1070 AD. After ascending the throne he faced great troubles, some of the vassal chiefs had risen against Mahīpāla II, and there had been a general upheaval in the country even on the same time he imprisoned his two brothers (Surpala II and Rampala) on charges of treason.

Taking advantage of the rebellion of the feudal chiefs against Mahipala II, Surapala II was freed from prison. Vigrahapala III's vassal Dibyak fought a battle against Mahipala II and defeated him. After the victory over Mahipala II, Dibyak declared himself independent ruler of North Bengal. As a symbol of his victory, he established a victory pillar at Dibar Dighi in North Bengal.

== Reign ==
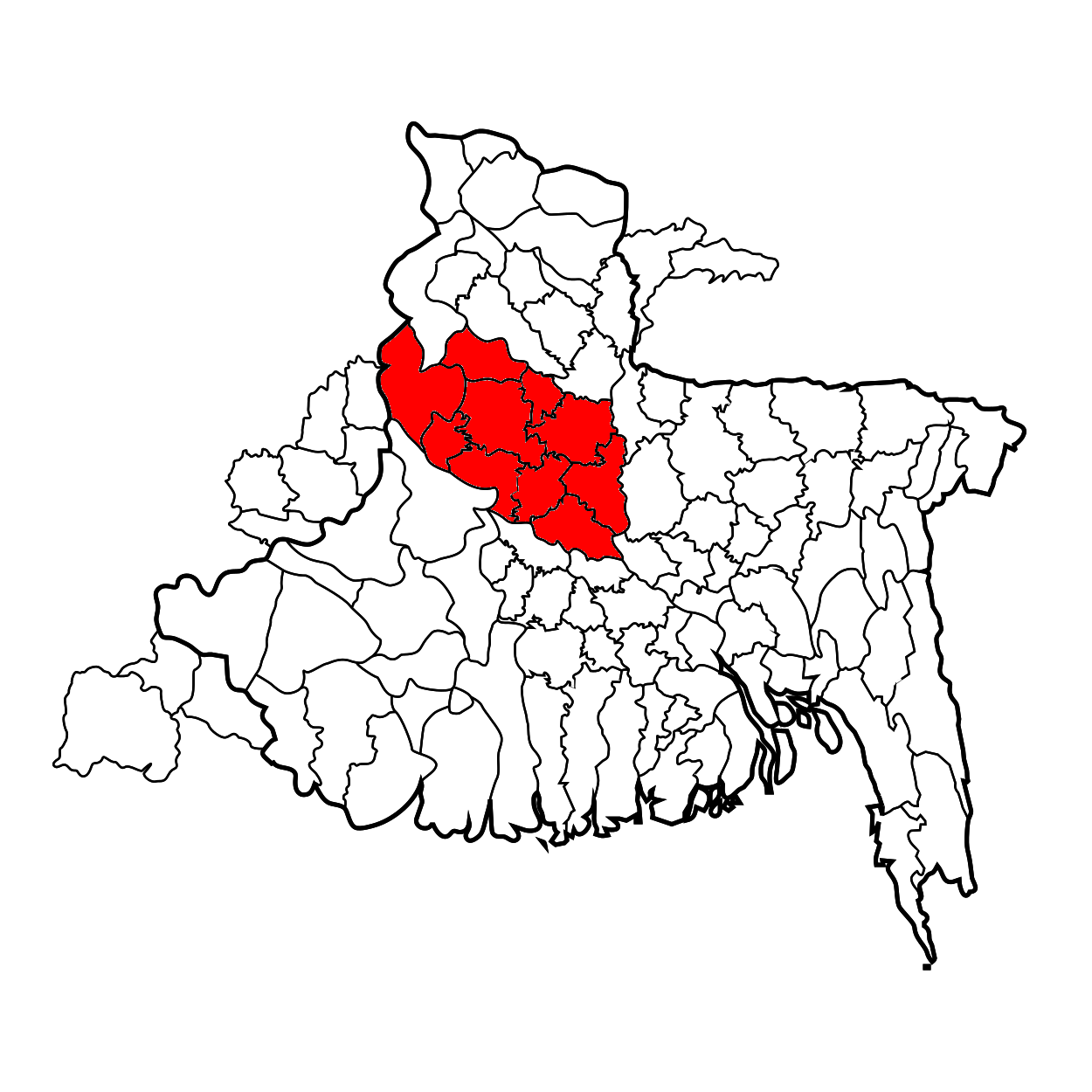
Varendra region

After his coronation, Dibyak came into conflict with the neighboring Varman dynasty. Alongside Divya, the Varman king Jatavarman also declared independence from the Palas and began to rule in East Bengal. Although Jatavarman launched a military campaign against Dibyak, it did not cause any significant damage to him.

== Family tree ==
Malhadāsa (Founder of the Dasa dynasty of North Bengal)
  - Suradāsa
    - Sanghadāsa
      - Yasodasa
                - Maharaja Dibyak
                - Rudak
                  - Bhima

== See also ==
- Varendra Rebellion
- Yasodasa
- Dibar Dighi
- Bhima
