= Bikrampur =

Former historical administrative unit in Bangladesh

Coordinates: 23°33′N 90°33′E

- Vikramapura
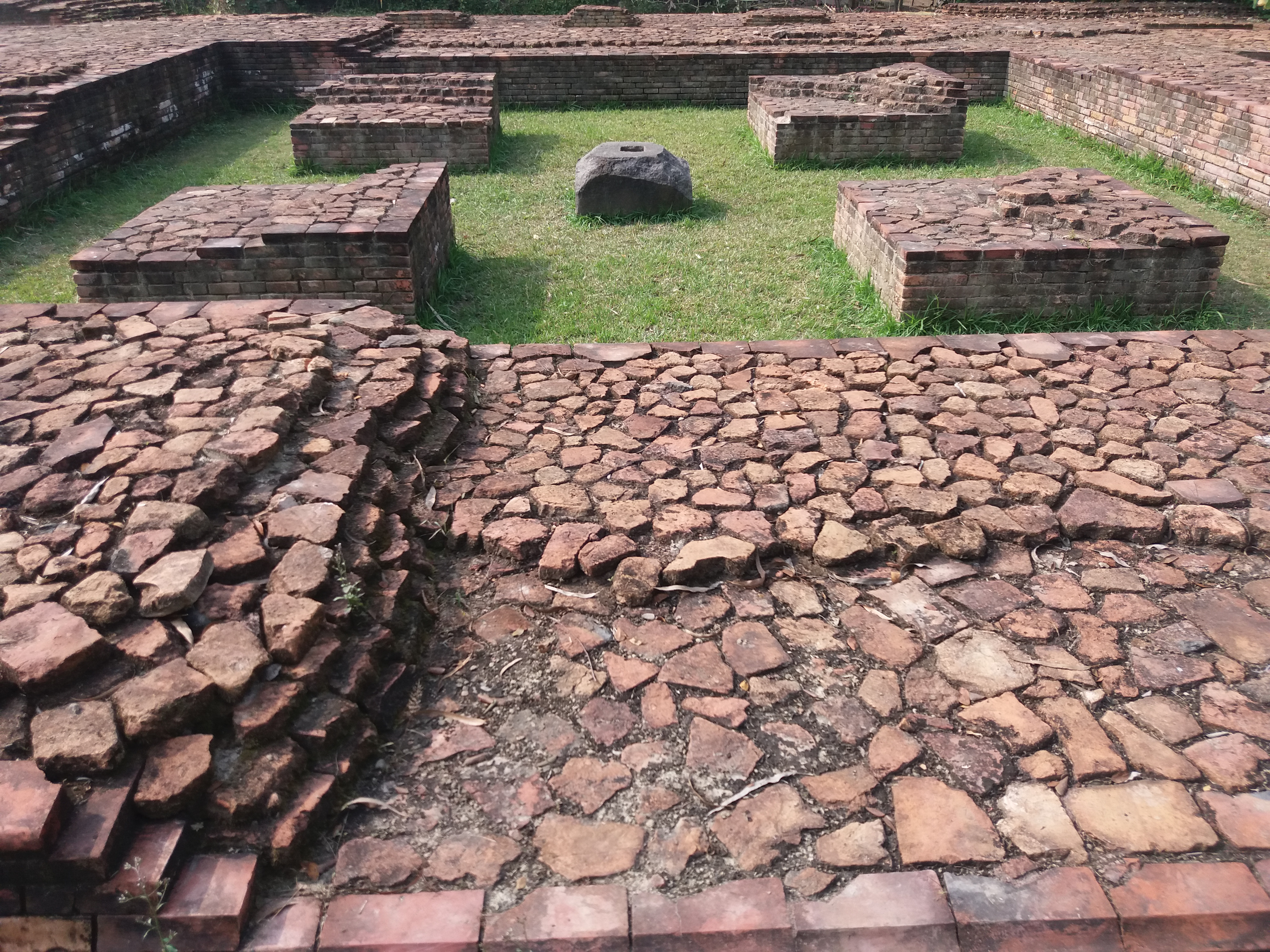
- Ancient ruins of Bikrampur
- Nickname: City of Courage
- Interactive map of Bikrampur
- Country: British India
- Presidency: Bengal Presidency
- Sub-division: Dhaka
- Demonym(s): Bikrampuri, Bikrampuira

Bikrampur (lit. City of Courage) was a historic region and a sub-division of Dhaka within the Bengal Presidency during the period of British India. Located along the banks of the Padma River (a major distributary of the Ganges), it was a significant cultural and political centre in both ancient and medieval Bengal. Today, the region is part of the Munshiganj District in Bangladesh.

== History ==
=== Pala Era ===
The region was successively ruled by Vigrahapala I, Narayanapala, Rajyapala, Gopala II, Vigrahapala II, Mahipala, Naya Pala, Vigrahapala III, Mahipala II, Shurapala II, Ramapala, Kumarapala, Gopala III and Madanapala. Pala empire disintegrated in 1174 weakened by attacks of the rising Sena dynasty.

=== Chandra Era ===
During the rule of Srichandra (reigned 930 – 975 AD), the administrative centre of the Chandra kingdom was established at Bikrampur. The Varman Dynasty (1035-1150 CE) replaced the Chandras and established their independent kingdom.

=== Varman Era ===
After the fall of the Chandras, The Varman Dynasty became powerful in East Bengal. The Varmans claimed that they are descended from a branch of Yadava Dynasty of Simhapur. Jat Varman, Hari Varman Samala Varman were the most powerful rulers, who ruled in Bikrampur. Bhoja Varman was the last independent ruler of the Varman Dynasty who was defeated by Vijaysena of the Sena dynasty.

=== Sena Era ===
A copper-plate inscription from the time of the ruler Vijay Sen (ruled 1097–1160), founder of the Sen Dynasty, was found in Barrackpore, in 1911. In this inscription, Bikrampur was mentioned as the capital of that region. It continued to be the capital throughout the, Sena Dynasty. In 1205, a Turkic general of the Delhi Sultanate Muhammad Bakhtiyar Khalji defeated the then-ruler Lakshman Sen in Nadia. Lakshman fled to Bikrampur. His two sons Vishwarup Sen and Keshab Sen kept ruling from here until 1230. However the copper-plate inscriptions during their reign do not mention Bikrampur as the capital. Another Hindu ruler, Danuj Rai, defeated a successor of Keshab Sen and started ruling from here. In early 1280, he moved the capital to Suvarnagrama (later named Sonargaon).

=== Mughal Era ===
Mughal Emperor Akbar established Bikrampur as one of the 52 parganas of Sonargaon sarkar in the Bengal subah during his administrative reforms implemented between 1572–1580. During his time, Chand Rai and Kedar Rai were the Zamindars of Bikramapur. In the expeditions against Bara-Bhuiyans, Mughal Subahdar Man Singh killed Kedar Rai in the early 1600s.

In post-Aurangzeb era, during the time of Nawab Murshid Quli Khan, Bikrampur was divided into eight taluks – Bhagyakul, Sreenagar, Maijpara, Sinhapara, Taltala, Sirajdikhan, Louhajong and Baligaon. Each taluk was represented by one zamindar. Muhammad Azim Khan became the Zamindar of Louhajong who held the title of "Khan Bahadur". Gobinda Prasad Roy became the Zamindar of Maijpara.

== Notable people ==
- Fakhruddin Ahmed (born 1940)
- Iajuddin Ahmed (1931–2012)
- Atiśa (c. 982–1054 CE)
- Humayun Azad (1947–2004)
- Bhanu Bandopadhyay (1920–1983)
- Manik Bandopadhyay (19 May 1908 – 3 December 1956)
- Pratima Bandopadhyay (1934–2004)
- Atin Bandyopadhyay (1934–2019)
- Kedareswar Banerjee (1900–1975)
- Rameshwar Banerjee (8 February 1925 – 21 November 1945)
- Benoy Basu (1908–1930)
- Samaresh Basu (1924–1988)
- Nripen Chakraborty (1905–2004)
- Sabitri Chatterjee (born 22 February 1937)
- Aghorenath Chattopadhyay (1851–1915)
- Nishikanta Chattopadhyay (1852 – 1910)
- Soorjo Coomar Goodeve Chuckerbutty (1826–1874)
- Brojen Das (1927–1998)
- Chittaranjan Das (1870–1925)
- Durga Mohan Das (1841–1897)
- Narayan Debnath (1925-2022)
- Dwarkanath Ganguly (1844–1898)
- Suhasini Ganguly (1909–1965)
- Kaliprosanna Ghosh (1843–1910)
- Prafulla Chandra Ghosh (1891–1983)
- Badal Gupta (1912–1930)
- Dinesh Gupta (1911–1931)
- Jogendranath Gupta (1883–1965)
- Chashi Nazrul Islam (1941–2015)
- Radhu Karmakar (1919–1993)
- Adilur Rahman Khan (b. 1961)
- Muhammad Hamidullah Khan (1938–2011)
- Prasanta Chandra Mahalanobis (1893–1972)
- Imdadul Haq Milan (born 1955)
- Ashutosh Mukhopadhyay (1920–1989)
- Shirshendu Mukhopadhyay (born 1935)
- Sarojini Naidu (1879–1949)
- Kedar Ray (1561–1603)
- Siddhartha Shankar Ray (1920–2010)
- Mokshadacharan Samadhyayi (1874–?)
- Asit Sen (1922–2001)
- Soham Swami (1858–1918)
- Sarada Ukil (1888–1940)

== See also ==
- Munshiganj Vihara
