= Bhima (Varendra king) =

Medieval ruler of Varendra

- King of Varendra

King of Varendra
- Reign: c. 1075–1105 AD
- Predecessor: Rudaka
- Successor: None (conquered by Ramapala)
- Born: Bhima
- Died: c. 1105 AD; Varendra
- Dynasty: Kaivarta

Dibar Dighi
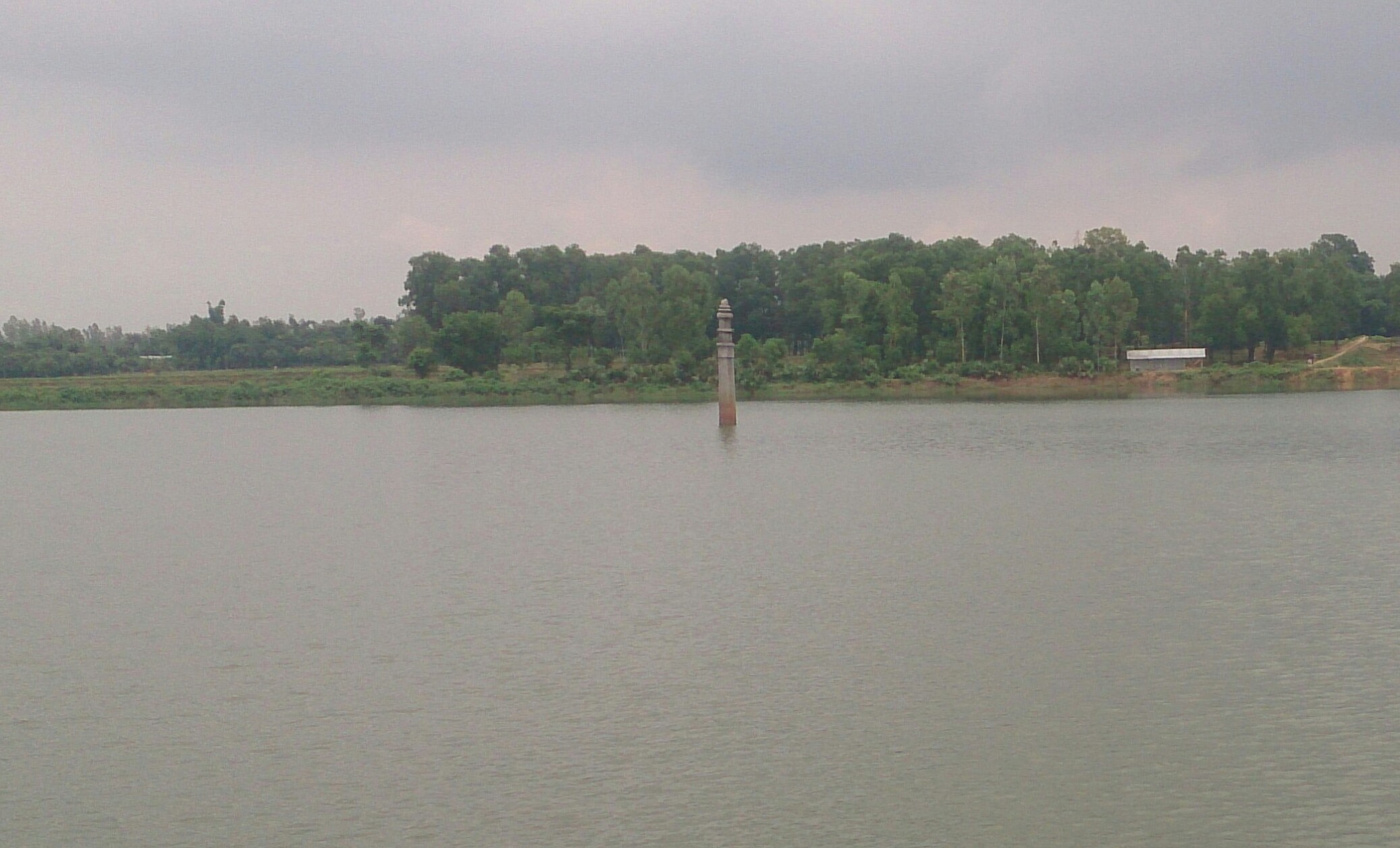
- King Bhima excavated the Dibar Dighi and built the Divar Jayastambha (Victory Pillar)
- Interactive map of Dibar Dighi
- Location: Patnitala Upazila, Naogaon District
- Coordinates: 25.1225°N 88.6202°E
- Basin countries: Bangladesh
- Max. length: 1,200 ft (370 m)
- Max. width: 1,200 ft (370 m)
- Surface area: 20 acres (8.1 ha)
- Average depth: 12 ft (3.7 m)

Bhima ruled Varendra for thirty years, and during his reign, Varendra was transformed into a prosperous kingdom. Bhima was a benevolent and popular king, and he deprived the Brahmins and the privileged landed class of their privileges and collected taxes from them to dedicate himself to the welfare of the farmers and common subjects. Because of his egalitarian mindset and dedication to public welfare, he was called "Mahāmahima". Bhima's memory in Varendra is still preserved through landmarks such as Bhima's Dyke, Bhima's Jungle, Bhima Sagar and Bhima's Panti.

== Establishment and history of the dynasty ==
During the reign of the Pala kings, in 1075–1080 AD, the feudal lord Divya united some feudal lords and peasants, killed the Pala king Mahipala, and established sovereignty in Varendra. After Divya's death, his brother Rudaka and nephew Bhima ruled Varendra. Bhima was the member of the illustrious Dasa family, a 6th generation descendant of Yasodasa.

Historian Ramesh Chandra Majumdar stated that Mahipala's brother Ramapala tried to recover Varendra but failed. Rather, Divya attacked Ramapala's kingdom and unsettled him. Although the Ramacharitam does not mention any events during Divya's reign, it is clear that one who could fight against Barman Dynasty and Ramapala and defend Varendra must have been a powerful king, and his authority in Varendra was firmly established. The Ramacharita contains several laudatory verses about Bhima and describes the power and prosperity of his reign. The Dibar Dighi in Dinajpur still bears the memory of his dynasty.

In this context, historian Niharranjan Ray mentioned that even during Rudaka's reign after Divya, Ramapala could not accomplish anything. Once Rudaka's brother became the ruler of Varendra, the well-established Kaivarta power appeared in a newer and stronger form. Bhima was a popular king, and his memory is still alive today. Ramapala, alarmed, went from door to door of neighboring kings and both former and current independent and autonomous feudal lords of the Pala state, begging for their help. He had to purchase this support by giving away vast lands and immense wealth.

In this regard, Niharranjan Ray further said that in the war against Bhima, Ramapala received full cooperation from at least fifteen kings and feudal leaders. It was not possible for Bhima to withstand this combined force. The Ramacharitam contains a detailed account of Ramapala's campaign to recover Varendra. On the northern bank of the Ganges, two armies fought a fierce battle, and while fighting on elephant-back, Bhima was captured in the battle due to a stroke of misfortune. Bhima's countless treasures and royal wealth were plundered by Ramapala's forces. But immediately after Bhima's capture, one of Bhima's closest friends and allies, Hari, regrouped the defeated and scattered soldiers and again faced Ramapala's son in battle. But through immense bribes, the soldiers, feudal lords, and even Hari were subdued, and thus, through deceit and corruption, Ramapala won the war unethically. Bhima, along with his family, was killed at the hands of Ramapala.

In the folklore, literature, and culture of Bangladesh, Bhima is still remembered with reverence.

== Family tree ==
Malhadāsa (Founder of the Dasa dynasty of North Bengal)
  - Suradāsa
    - Sanghadāsa
      - Yasodasa
                - Dibyak (5th descendant of Yasodasa)
                - Rudak
                  - Bhima
