= Dibar Dighi =

- দিবর দীঘি (Bengali)
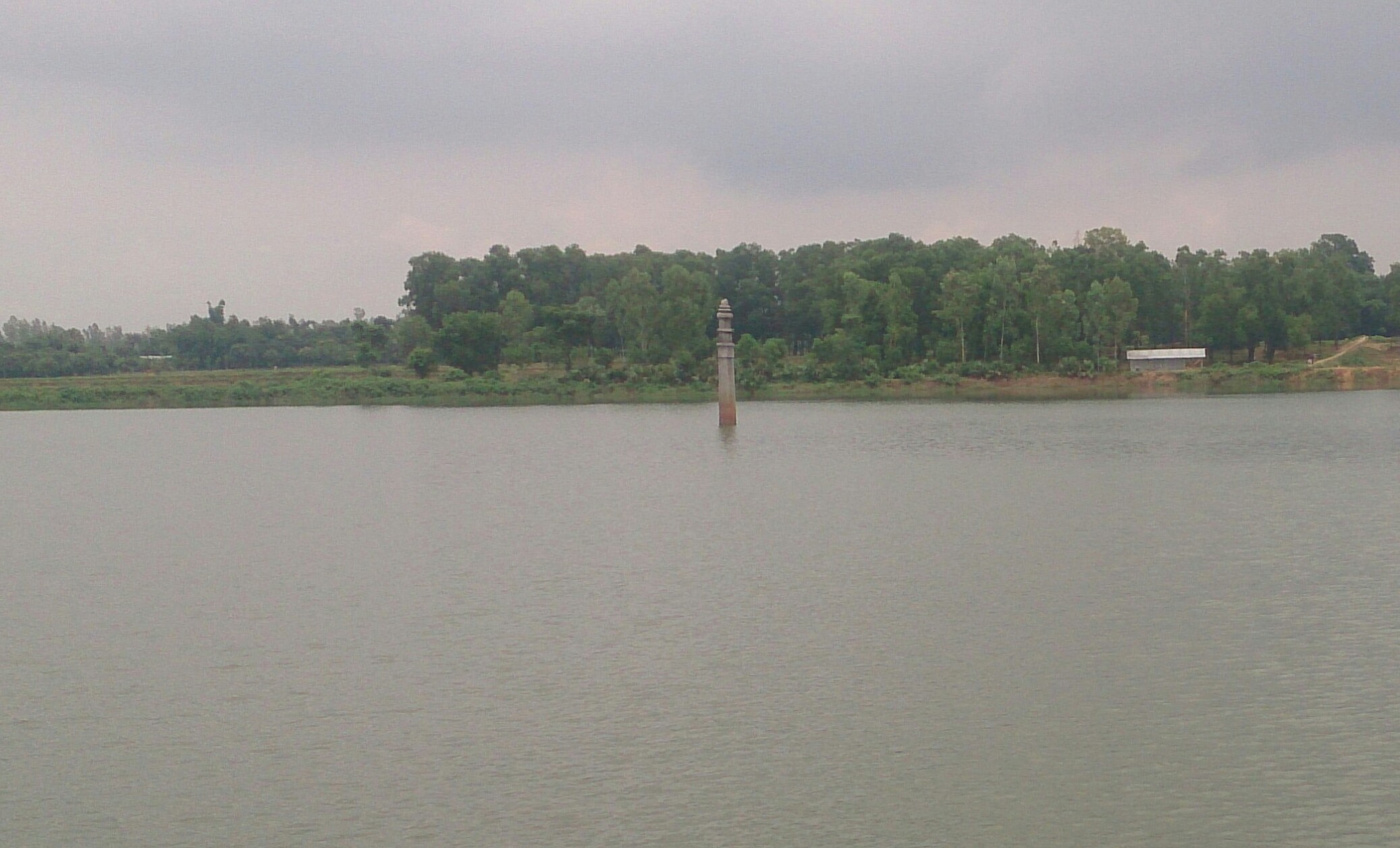
- View of Dibor Dighi
- Interactive map of Dibar Dighi
- 25.1225°N 88.6202°E
- Location: Patnitala Upazila, Naogaon District, Bangladesh

Dibar Dighi (Bengali: দিবর দীঘি) is a tank in Bangladesh. An octagonal granite pillar, associated with Kaivarta (later identified as Mahishya), chief Dibyak, who usurped the Pala throne, stands in the centre of the tank.

== Location ==
The site is located in Dibar village, on the northern side of Nazipur-Sapahar highway in Patnitala Upazila of Naogaon District.

== Architecture ==
=== Dibar Dighi ===
Alexander Cunningham, whose "servant" visited the site in 1879–80, noted the lake to spread about 1200 square ft. (Note: On the role played by these "servants", see Raj, Kapil (2007). "When Human Travellers become Instruments: The Indo-British Exploration of Central Asia in the Nineteenth Century". Relocating Modern Science: Circulation and the Construction of Knowledge in South Asia and Europe, 1650–1900. Palgrave Macmillan UK. pp. 181–222. doi:10.1057/9780230625310_7. ISBN 978-0-230-62531-0.) Average depth was about 12 ft. The tank currently occupies about 20 acres of land and sits atop a mound, spread over 100 acres.

=== Kaivarta Stambha ===
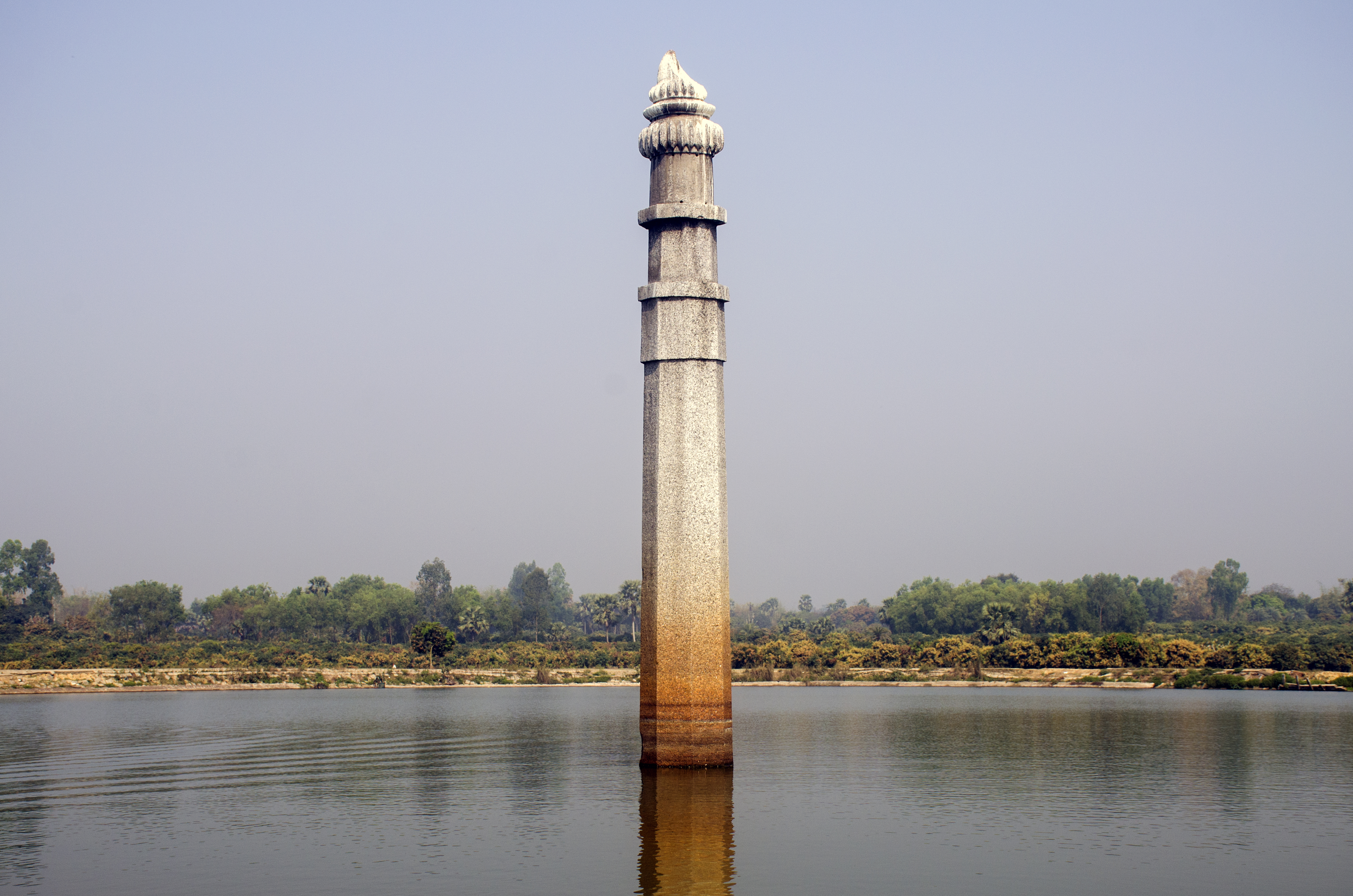
Dibar Stambha

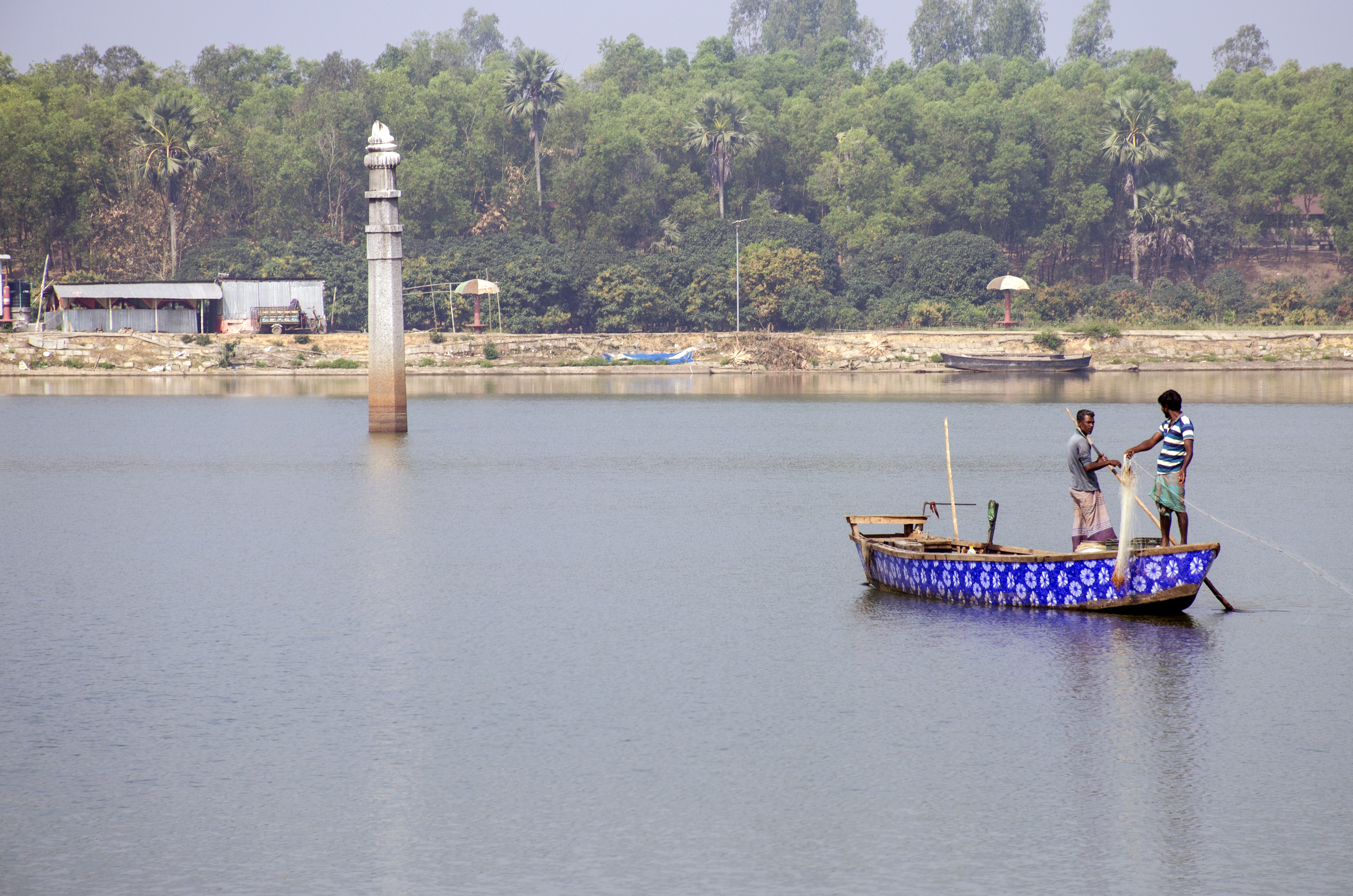
Fishing at Dibar Dighi, with Dibar Stambha is the background

The tank is primarily famed for housing a semi-submerged granite pillar — locally known as Kaivarta Stambha — in its center. The apex of the pillar is crown shaped and decorated with three inflated circular rings. The pillar does not have any inscriptions. Francis Buchanon-Hamilton's survey of Bengal (1807–08) measured the net height to be 22.5 cubits (33 ft, 75 in) and the diameter to be 6.5 cubits (9 ft, 9 in). (Note: Cunningham later noted that this was actually the value of circumference. Cunningham's "servant" committed the same error, too.) (Note: For a critical perspective on Hamilton's survey of Bengal, see Vicziany, Marika (October 1986). "Imperialism, Botany and Statistics in early Nineteenth-Century India: The Surveys of Francis Buchanan (1762–1829)". Modern Asian Studies. 20 (4): 625–660. doi:10.1017/S0026749X00013676. ISSN 1469-8099. For an overview of British surveys and their roles in colonial knowledge production, see Edney, Matthew H. (1997). Mapping an Empire: The Geographical Construction of British India, 1765-1843. University of Chicago Press. ISBN 0-226-18486-2.) He had deemed it to be octagonal in shape.

Cunningham's expedition revised the height to be approximately 30 ft — the visible portion spanned 10 ft, the submerged portion 12 ft, and the rest, underground foundation. From the logged data, he determined the pillar to be nonagonal having side-length of 12 in. each; diameter came out to be 29 in. Cunningham regretted that he did not personally visit the site, noting that such a large single-shaft stone pillar was yet to be recorded in Indian subcontinent, after Ashoka's reign.

A Bangladeshi archaeologist confirmed Cunningham's approximation but changed the distribution; 12 ft was above water level, 8 ft was submerged, and 10 ft was below ground.

== History ==
The site is yet to be accurately dated. The name of the village as 'Dibar' may be derived after the name of king Dibyak or Divyak. Local legends construct a mythological origin, wherein the lake was dug within one night by a jinn.

From an etymological perspective and literary history, it is currently argued that the tank and the pillar were commissioned to commemorate the victory of a local Kaivarta (Mahishya) vassal, Dibyak (var. Dibya) over his 11th century overlord, Mahipala II. (Note: The main source for historical reconstruction is Ramacharitam by Sandhyakar Nandi. There are three other epigraphical records exist of Dibyak.) The cause of the war between Dibyak and Mahipala II can not be ascertained — R. C. Majumdar interpreted it to be a rebellion by a local samanta, strategically timed to the weakening of Pala authority whilst Ram Sharan Sharma took it to be a peasant rebellion against feudal suppression. The construction might have been executed in the reign of Dibyak himself or his successors — brother Rudak, and nephew Bhim. (Note: Bhim was subdued by Ramapala (supported by his kinsmen and other samantas) later, and put to death; this brought the rule of Kaibartas over Barendra to an end. Nandi was probably the court-poet of Ramapala.)

== Preservation ==
In 1939, the Central Government declared Dibar Dighi to be a heritage site. Rajshahi Social Forestry Division has created an artificial forest (alongside a mini-zoo) around the tank; boating trips seem to be allowed.

== See also ==
- Dibyak
- Nazipur
- Varendra rebellion
- Ramacharitam
- Mahishya
