= Mahishya =

Bengali Hindu predominantly agrarian caste

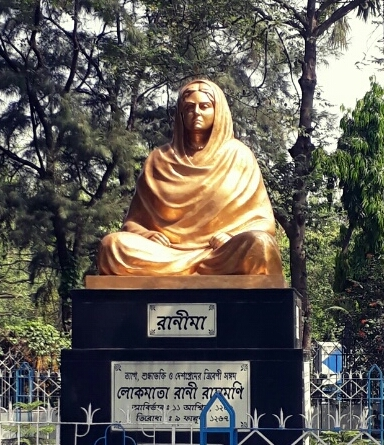
- Rani Rashmoni, founder of the Dakshineswar Kali Temple in Calcutta, was born in a Mahishya family

Regions with significant populations
- Presidency Division (included Khulna Division then) • Burdwan Division (incl. Medinipur Division) • Rajshahi Division (incl. Malda Division) • Dhaka Division: ~2.38 million (around a quarter of province's Hindu population c. 1931)

Languages
- Bengali

Religion
- Hinduism

Mahishya (IAST: Māhiṣya) is a Bengali Hindu traditionally agrarian caste, and formed the largest caste in undivided Bengal. Mahisyas were, and still are, an extremely heterogeneous caste, encompassing all possible classes in terms of material conditions and ranks — ranging from a majority of small farmers and working class individuals to a significant section of landed magnates and industrial entrepreneurs.

== Origin, epigraphy and texts ==
=== Epigraphy ===
The Kalaikuri-Sultanpur copperplate inscription of 439 CE brings to light the presence of Kaivartaśarman, a Brahmin Kuṭumbin (peasant landholder) in the local administration (adhikaraṇa) in Varendra of Gupta period. There are references to vṛttis (enclosed land) in same administrative unit like Osinnakaivartavṛtti, Uddhannakaivartavṛttivahikala, in the copperplate inscriptions of Mahīpāla I. Historian Ryosuke Furui suggests this as the probable location of the leader of Samantas who revolted against the Pala regime. In one inscription of Madanapala, Kaivarta was assigned vritti in royal estate along with Buddhist establishment and Carmakāra. In one plate of Gopala II, kaivartta was listed as one of the lowest categories of the rural society. It makes a striking contrast with the references to kaivartta in the later inscriptions and the Råmacarita, which rather show their higher social position. Furui notes this ‘shift’ may mean the upward social mobility of a part of kaivarttas. Otherwise it shows some diversity within a social group labelled as 'kaivartta'. In Bengal the system of assigning land for military service was known as 'Kaivarta-vrtti', was prevalent before the 12th century CE. This system is considered to have contributed to the rise of powerful Kaivarta chiefs and to the Kaivarta revolt in the closing years of the 11th century, which challenged and overthrew the authority of the king in parts of Bengal.

=== Smritis, Puranas and medieval texts ===
According to the 13th-century text Brihaddharma Purana, children of Shudra fathers and Kshatriya mothers are dāsa, an Uttam Sankar (literally, good mixed) and their occupation is agriculture. According to the Brahma Vaivarta Purana, whose chapter describing mixed castes was likely inserted after 16th century, Kaivarta was one born of a Kshatriya father and a Vaishya mother. Some ancient or mediaeval texts like Yājñavalkya Smṛti and Gautama Dharmasutra give identical parentage, that is, one born to a Kshatriya father and a Vaishya mother for Mahishya, who was supposed to be engaged in the profession of astronomy or agriculture. The late sixteenth century text Chandimangal mentioned one group of Dāsas, who were cultivators. The term 'Chasi-Kaibarta' first appeared in Bharatchandra Ray's Annada Mangal (1753). According to the Sambandha Nirnaya text, the Dāsas or Mahishyas were among the powerful princes and landholders prior to the time of King Adisura.

Historian Sevananda Bharati stated that the Mahisya community originated from the northern bank along the Narmada River, located near the Vindhya range, and linked by Bharati to modern Ratnavati, which he believes to be the ancient Mahishmati, which was probably the former capital city of the Mahishyas. Bharati also mentioned that this community left from Ayodhya (on the Sarayu River) and migrated towards the Midnapore area following the easternmost region of the Vindhya Mountains.

Pandit Lalmohan Vidyanidhi and Mahim Chandra Majumder held that the Mahishya race were powerful and separated into four groups: Aswapati, Gajapati, Narapati and Chatrapati. Where the Gajapatis had established their power in Odisha.

In the 19th century various groups from different regions of Bengal were known by the names like Uttar-rarhi Chasi-Kaibrtta, Dakshin-rarhi Tunte Kaibartta (mulberry planters and silk traders), Purba-desi Kaibartta (cultivators), Das or Chasi/Haliya Das, Siuli (date tappers), Mala or Jele (fishers) etc.; substantial majority of them later consolidated and identified as Mahishya. According to historian Sekhar Bandyopadhyay, the Mahishyas originated from landholding communities such as the Bhuiyan, Khandait, and Chasi Kaibarta, who were associated with occupations such as land-holding, fighting, agriculture, and fishing.

== History ==
According to Niharranjan Ray some Kaibartas held posts of administrators and legal officers from eighth to thirteenth century. Jyotirmoyee Sarma, another historian, observes that some Kaivartas, alternately with some Brahmins, acted as ministers in Pala royal courts, such as Yasodasa, who held a position of prime importance at the court of Rajyapala. In eleventh century, in a rebellious hostility, Divya, originally a feudal chief (Samanta) of Kaibarttas, killed Mahipala II, seized Varendra and established a regime there, which was ruled by him, his brother Rudok and nephew Bhima for around half a century. R. C. Majumdar interpreted it as a rebellion of local Samantas. Romila Thapar suggests that this is perhaps the first peasant rebellion in Indian history. Ram Sharan Sharma states that in his rule Bhima dispossessed the brahmanical and other beneficiaries and levied taxes from them, and prioritised the interests of the peasants. Ray also notes that some of the Kaibartas were well versed in Sanskrit and composed poetry during the eleventh and twelfth centuries.

At the start of the 18th century, the Bengali society had solidified into a definite structure with the three upper castes of Bengal, the Brahmin, Kayastha and the Baidyas, having a collective hegemony over the "Bhadralok samaj", though prominent individuals from some other middle-ranking castes including Mahishyas, who had acquired sufficient education, fame and prosperity were also undoubtedly considered as Bhadralok. In fact, Mahishyas, in general, tried their best to align themselves with the Bhadralok image in order to achieve upper social mobility. During this period, certain westernised & financially affluent members had adopted an even more ambitious means of achieving respectability. An educated section of mahishyas had joined the Calcutta based Brahmo Samaj of the Bengali middle class Bhadraloks and had also, under the leadership of local Mahishya leaders like Madhusudan Jana and Bipin Bihari Sasmal, established a Brahmo Samaj at Contai with connections to the Sadharan Brahmo Samaj of Calcutta.

At the end of the 19th century scholars appeared to differ on the rank of the Mahisyas in Bengali society. Sankritist and antiquarian, Rajendralal Mitra appeared to believe that Mahisyas were a caste of small farmers and could not afford forces of modernity such as school education. But the president of the college of Nadia pandits, Jogendranath Bhattacharya, who published a book "Hindu Castes and Sects" in 1896, wrote that in the Tamluk and Contai subdivisions of Midnapore, where population of high castes was small and Kaibarttas were numerous, they may be reckoned among the local aristocracy and in other districts their position was next only to the Kayasthas. In 1864, the first decree (Byabasthāpatra) was taken from 64 Brahmin scholars in Bikrampur, Dhaka to increase the community's social status. With the encouragement and patronage of Krishna Chandra Roy, the Zamindar of Nannur, Dhaka, Basanta Kumar Roy wrote the first book on Mahishya name claim - "Mahishya Bibriti" in around 1890. The Mahishya movement during the late nineteenth century was the work of successful men who had seized the new avenues of power opened by commerce, education and professions. Whereas the samajpatis, who as substantial landholding families (such as Tamluk and Moyna families) had from generation to generation stood as the social leaders of different local samajs of the Kaibartta community, were generally opposed to the movement.

Till then all these individuals were known as Chasi-kaibartta which was an incredibly diverse caste. The Chasi-kaibartta, who numbered more than half of the population in eastern and southern parts of Midnapore, reclaimed the culturable wastelands and thus secured for themselves during the days of Mughal faujdars a dominant position in the agrarian economy, filling up all the strata - zamindars, jotedars or rich farmers, small peasants down to share-croppers and agricultural labourers. Some royal families of Medinipur such as the Tamluk Raj, the Moyna Raj, the Turka Raj, the Birkul Raj and the Kajlagarh Raj identified themselves as Mahishyas.

In the district of Dhaka all the upper and middle classes of Mahishyas, who were also known as Parasar Das or Halik Das, were zamindars and substantial landholders from the time of Muslim rule. In the districts like Burdwan, Hooghly, Nadia and the 24 Parganas or in the eastern areas like Faridpur, they enjoyed an important position in agriculture, some of them being substantial landholders, grain-dealers and peasant-proprietors. In some subdivisions of south-western Bengal, some families made fortune by silk production, salt production and trade. There were some major landed families in Calcutta such as Marh family in Janbazar and the Mondal family of Bawali in Tollygunge In the city there was a large mahishya contingent working as traders, manufacturers and professionals like lawyers, engineers and doctors.

Although a considerable number of Mahishyas are still involved in traditional work in rural areas, within a generation they gave up agriculture in large numbers in favour of engineering and skilled labour in the urbanised areas of Howrah and Kolkata. In Howrah, the Mahishyas are the most numerous and successful businesspeople. Since the early 1920s upward mobility of Mahishyas from working class to factory owners resulted in gradual loss of ground for old entrants to the industry, propertied Brahmins and Kayasthas; by 1967, the Mahishya community owned 67 percent of the engineering businesses in the district. The rapid ascent of the Mahishyas from a background of agricultural subsistence to upper echelons of business was striking. Their gradual and steady entry into the industrial economy and their consequent strong and enduring presence, led researchers Raymond L. Owens and Ashis Nandy to refer to them as the "new Vaishyas".

== Role in Independence Movement ==
Digambar Biswas and Bishnu Charan Biswas, small zamindars and moneylenders of Nadia, organized the peasants of Nadia and Jessore, and raised an army of Lathiyals and spearmen. They led the Indigo revolt in the region and paid off the peasants' debts after the rebellion. Disgruntled former employees of Indigo factories, village headmen (Mandals), and also members of some other peasant communities participated largely in this rebellion against European planters.

Mahishyas played a crucial role during the early stages of the armed revolutionary movement. Hemchandra Kanungo, who was one of the founding members of Anushilan Samiti, was sent to Paris to learn the technique of making Bombs, whose expertise travelled to all revolutionary circles across British India. Another one of the early recruits, also from the caste, Basanta Kumar Biswas led the famous 1912 attempt on the life of the then Viceroy of India, Lord Hardinge.

Mahishyas also played a prominent role in the Congress led nationalist movement. Mahishya movement leaders like Gagan Chandra Biswas and Mahendranath Ray had long been associated with the Congress and its movements. Deshapran Birendranath Sasmal led the Mahishyas against Union board taxes in 1919 which later merged with non-cooperation movement in Midnapore. During Civil disobedience movement (1930–34) the mahishyas paved the way for future course of actions leading to virtual breakdown of British Administration in the areas of Tamluk and Contai.

By the 1940s, Mahisyas were the backbone of the Congress-led militant nationalist movement in Midnapore and South Bengal as a whole. As a matter of fact, a majority of leaders and foot soldiers of the Quit India movement in Midnapore, such as Matangini Hazra, Satish Chandra Samanta and Sushil Kumar Dhara were Mahishyas. They had set up a parallel government Tamralipta Jatiya Sarkar in Tamluk which ran for nearly two years (1942–44). It had its own army, judiciary and finance department. Biplabi, the mouthpiece of the parallel national government in Midnapore, was later published in English.

== Varna status ==
In 19th-century Bengal, Chasi Kaibartas were identified as one of the Sat Shudras (clean Shudras), though the Jalia Kaibartas and the priests of the Kaibartas were considered as unclean. The Mahishyas have generally been considered as 'middle-ranking shudras' in the caste structure of Bengal. Like South India, the social groups of eastern India have traditionally been divided in two groups - Brahmins and Shudras. In 1901, Mahishyas claimed to be Vaishyas, which status was also claimed by their priests Gaudadya Brahmins for Mahishyas. In 1931 census, they claimed to be recorded as Kshatriyas or Mahishya Kshatriyas. Historian Ratnalekha Ray notes that the caste has a peasant-militia background. Historian Jyotirmoyee Sarma has opined that the varna status of Mahishyas is disputed.

== Socio-economic condition ==
Primarily, Jotedars, peasant proprietors or intermediaries between the Zamindars and the cultivators were predominantly drawn from intermediate castes like the Mahishyas, Sadgops or Aguris. On Occasion, even Zamindari estates came under the ownership and control of members of these castes. The Mahishyas in particular, had established themselves since the late mediaeval period, as a dominant political and economic force in the adjacent districts of Midnapore and Howrah. Tamluk, Moynagarh, Kajlagarh, Turkagarh and Birkul in Midnapore district and several other zamindari estates in the district of Howrah belonged to them.

Although the financial, social, and political success of Mahishyas is notable, they have often been stigmatised due to their agrarian roots. Mahishyas have not been averse to manual labour, which has often been considered demeaning by elite among "higher castes". For instance, when the battle took place between Subhas Chandra Bose and Birendranath Sasmal for the post of the chief executive officer of Calcutta Municipal Corporation, which then dominated political life of Bengal, Bose deftly emerged victorious. Although Chittaranjan Das had originally proposed to reward the services of Sasmal by offering him the job, he soon backed out when he found out that the choice would offend the Kayastha clique of the city. One of them went so far as to comment: ‘Will a keot from Midnapur come and rule in Calcutta?’ (Note: Refer Mohanty, Nivedita (2005). Oriya Nationalism Quest for a United Orissa 1866-1956. Prafulla. Page 263: "In 1924, when Birendranath Sasmal claimed the post of Chief Executive Officer of Calcutta corporation an untoward situation occurred. A newspaper reported that he was greeted with derogatory slogans because of his Oriya origin and his claim for the post was overruled.") Sasmal asked his mentor Das two questions at a meeting of the Bengal Provincial Congress Committee (BPCC): '(1) Subhas Bose had been elected member and his brother Sarat Bose alderman of the Calcutta Corporation by the Swaraj party. Why was the BPCC bent on establishing the mastery of one family over the Corporation? (2) In the highest executive post of the Corporation, it was being proposed that he be bypassed and another man appointed. Was this because he was held in contempt for his low caste?' Das expressed annoyance with the first question and gave an inadequate answer to the second which did not satisfy Sasmal. Sasmal left the BPCC in utter humiliation and anger, and went into his legal practice and his control of local politics in Contai and Midnapore.

In 1921 census Mahishyas were included in the list of "depressed classes" as Chasi-Kaibarta, but affluent individuals refused to accept the depressed class status since they believed that it would seriously jeopardize their claims to "high caste Hindu" status. In 1946, however, a caste association of Mahishyas had pointed out that they were among the "intermediate and depressed" castes of Bengal being systematically deprived of their legitimate claims and shares in service. They urged the British government to help them by granting electorate separate from that of "caste Hindus" and scheduled castes and by granting special facilities in the matters of education, appointment to all departments etc.

As of late twelfth century Partha Chatterjee considered Mahishyas as the single most important 'middle-caste' group in south-western Bengal, where they are very numerous, consisting districts of Midnapore, 24 Parganas, Hooghly, Howrah; whereas Beech & Beech recognised them as the dominant caste in southern part of former two districts. Nadia and Murshidabad are other two districts where Mahishyas are numerically most dominant caste.

During 1980s there was lack of political will from the West Bengal government in recognising the backward castes in the state. Mandal Commission included both Chasi-Kaibarta and Mahishya in the list of 177 "backward classes" for the state of West Bengal. Since 1989, after the commission's proposals coming into force, a section among the lower middle and lower class Mahisyas mounted a low intensity campaign for OBC status. It was, however, opposed by some individuals of well-off sections, who had even gone to court against this initiative. In late 1990s Sen commission came to conclusion that Chasi-Kaibarta constituted a backward class and Mahishya as such was not a backward class in the state. By early 2000s, the OBC status was granted to Chasi-Kaibartas. Anyone who could produce documents to the effect that they belonged to the Chashi-Kaibarta caste was eligible for OBC status then. Since early 2010s, better-off among Mahisyas have also been campaigning for OBC status for the caste as whole, but the group named Mahishya still belongs to General category and continues to form the largest caste of West Bengal.

== Notable people ==
- Rani Rashmoni, Indian Zamindar, businesswoman, philanthropist, founder of Dakshineswar Kali Temple
- Diwan Mohanlal, Hindu Raja, Dewan of Siraj-ud-Daulah
- Babu Preetoram Marh, merchant, banian to the East India Company, founder of the Janbazar Raj family
- Babu Rajchandra Das, Indian Zamindar, merchant, businessman and philanthropist
- Babu Mathurmohan Biswas, Indian Zamindar, patron of Shri Ramakrishna
- Birendranath Sasmal, nationalist Barrister, politician, popularly known as Deshapran
- Mahendranath Ray, CIE, lawyer, educationist and politician, first elected chairperson of Howrah Municipal Corporation
- Gagan Chandra Biswas, industrialist, engineer, zamindar and social worker
- Hemchandra Kanungo, Indian revolutionary, founding member of the Anushilan Samiti, designer of India's first unofficial flag
- Basanta Kumar Biswas, Indian revolutionary and martyr, attempted assassin of Lord Hardinge
- Matangini Hazra, Indian freedom fighter and martyr, popularly known as Lady Gandhi
- Satish Chandra Samanta, Independence activist, politician, established Tamralipta Jatiya Sarkar
- Sushil Kumar Dhara, Independence activist, politician, founder of Bangla Congress
- Basanta Kumar Das, Independence activist, politician, helped draft the Constitution of India
- Nikunja Behari Maiti, Independence activist, politician, first Education Minister of West Bengal
- Anath Bondhu Panja, revolutionary, martyr, assassin of oppressive magistrate Bernard Burge
- Charu Chandra Bhandari, freedom fighter, politician, principal leader of Sarvodaya Movement
- Digambar Biswas, a peasant leader who planned, led and funded the Indigo revolt of 1859 against the British planters
- Bipin Bihari Sasmal, Zamindar, educationist and Politician.
- Alamohan Das, industrialist, businessman, namesake of Dasnagar
- Sharat Kumar Roy, Indian American geologist, first Indian to the North Pole
- Prabodh Kumar Bhowmick, Dean of Anthropology at the University of Calcutta
- Sourindra Mohan Sircar, botanist, former General President of ISCA
- Tarak Chandra Das, first Professor of Anthropology at the University of Calcutta
- Sunil Janah, photojournalist, co founder of Calcutta Film Society
- Kanan Devi, film actress, Dadasaheb Phalke Award winner of 1976
- Nirmalendu Chowdhury, musician, composer and singer
- Mani Lal Bhaumik, Indian American physicist, entrepreneur, best selling author
- Anil Kumar Gain, mathematician, founder of Vidyasagar University
- Suresh Biswas, circus ringmaster, involved in quelling the Brazilian Naval Revolt
- Pabitra Sarkar, academician and linguist, won the Order of the Rising Sun
- Madhusudan Jana, journalist, doctor, teacher and Social Worker, founded the nationalist Nihar Press in Contai
- Ramdas Adak, 17th-century Hindu poet and song composer, significant contributor of the Dharmamangal kavya
- Swami Tejasananda, Hindu monk of the Ramakrishna Order, founding principal of Ramakrishna Mission Vidyamandira & the first chief editor of Vedanta Kesari.
- Dinesh Das, novelist, poet and author, won the Rabindra Puraskar in 1982
- Anil Ghorai, novelist, poet and writer, won the Bankim Puraskar in 2010
- Dhirendra Narayan Roy, Indian doctor, Indian Army officer and member of the Tamluk Raj family
- Anil Biswas, foremost leftist politician, former member of the Politburo of CPIM
- Abha Maiti, lawyer, freedom fighter and politician, Member of Lok Sabha
- Sailen Manna, Indian footballer, only Asian named among the ten best Captains in the world by English FA in 1953

== See also ==
- Tamluk Raj Family
- Moyna Raj Family
- Turka Raj Family
- Birkul Raj family
- Janbazar Raj Family
- Bawali Raj Family
- Varendra rebellion
- Ramacharitam
- Dibar Dighi
