= Jaya Pala =

King of Kamarupa
- Predecessor: Dharma Pala
- Successor: Post abolished Timgyadeva as governor under Ramapala
- Dynasty: Pala

Jaya Pala (1075-1100) was a ruler during the Pala Dynasty (900–1100) of Kamarupa Kingdom.

== About ==
A member of the Brahma Pala dynasty, Jaya Pala ruled over Kamarupa at the close of the 11th century. He is mentioned in a Silimpur stone inscription found in Bogra district concerning Prasati of a Brahmin named Prahasa who is credited with construction of a temple, creation of a garden, and excavation of a tank. The inscription states that Prahasa, though persistently pressed, refused to accept "900 gold coins and a gift of landed property from Jaya Pala, king of Kamarupa, on the occasion of "tulapurusha dana" (great gift ceremony which involved the gift of gold etc. equal to the weight of the performer) performed by the latter". This inscription confirms his rule over Varendra region.

The Belava copperplate states that the founder of the Varman dynasty of Bengal, Jatavarmana (a contemporary of Jayapala) had captured the city of Pundravardhana from the king of Kamarupa.

The Vikramankadeva-charita of Bilhana, states that the armies of the Chalukya king Someshwara I, led by his son, the future Vikramaditya VI, defeated the kings of Gauda & Kamarupa. This king of Kamarupa is commonly identified as Jayapala.

The attribution of the conquest of Kamarupa to the Pala King Ramapala (1077-1133 AD) of Gauda by Sandhyakar Nandi in his Ramacharitam because it is supported by the Kamauli plates of Vaidyadeva.
