= Ramacharitam =

Sanskrit epic poem

The Ramacharitam is a Sanskrit epic poem written in Arya metre by a Bengali poet named Sandhyakar Nandi (c. 1084–1155 CE) during the Pala Empire. This work simultaneously narrates the story of the Ramayana and the Pala king Ramapala. It is mainly famous for describing the Varendra rebellion – a very critical event in early mediaeval history of Bengal.

== Manuscripts ==
A palm-leaf manuscript was discovered by Haraprasad Shastri from Nepal and published in 1910 by the Asiatic Society, Kolkata. Translations in English and Bangla were published in 1939 and 1953, respectively.

=== Author ===
Sandhyakar Nandi was patronaged by Madanapala and his biographical details are retrieved from the Kaviprashasti (of 20 couplets) appended at the end. Nandi hailed from Brihadbatu, a village close to Pundravardhana, and was the son of Prajapati Nandi, who was the Sandhi-Vigrahika (minister of peace and war) of Ramapala.

== Content ==
The poem, in four cantos, details the historical events in Bengal from the assassination of the Pala emperor Mahipala II by Divya, a rebel Kaivarta samanta up to the reign of Madanapala in 215 verses, employing double entendre. The central theme is the loss and subsequent recovery of Varendra.

The first and second cantos of the text describes, what has been since called "Varendra rebellion".

=== Varendra rebellion ===
In an asymmetrical battle between Mahipala II and a group of samantas (led by Divya, a Kaivarta), the former was defeated and his relatives imprisoned. Whilst the causes of the battle are not discussed, the defeat is blamed on Mahipala's poor strategy of war set against the explicit advice of councilors. Varendra was ceded away from Palas, and the House of Kaivartas were established for around half a century.

Divya was succeeded by his nephew, Bhima. In the meanwhile, Ramapala, a brother of Mahipala fled Varendra and assumed the remnants of Pala throne. Wishing to reclaim lost territories, he traveled around the kingdom purchasing assistance from Samantas. Among these samantas were his kinsmen from the Rashtrakutas of Anga, maternal uncle Mahana, and nephew Sivarajadeva.

Sivarajadeva would executed the first raid on the Kaivartas, destroying their defensive arrangements. This was followed by the main battle where Ramapala's army —cavalry, infantry, boat-units and elephant-men along with those of Samantas'— met Bhima's forces. In what is described as a battle of equals, Bhima was defeated yet treated with honor by Vittapala, Ramapala's son. (Note: Nandi eulogizes his valor and virtues.) Bhima however seem to have fled soon, for he enlarged his army by inducting untrained subjects from the lower rungs of society and confronted Ramapala again. This turned out to be a one sided catastrophe with Bhima's men getting marauded; Bhima was captured and executed, after being made to witness the death of his own kinsmen.

== Analysis ==
Though biased in favour of Ramapala, the work remains the only literary source for middle-late Pala history including Varendra Rebellion. The cause of the war between Dibyak and Mahipala II however can not be ascertained — R. C. Majumdar interpreted it to be a rebellion by a local samanta, strategically timed to the weakening of Pala authority whilst Ram Sharan Sharma took it to be a peasant rebellion against feudal suppression. It is argued that the Dibar Dighi (incl. the Kaivarta Stambha) were commissioned to commemorate Divya's victory.

Ryosuke Furui noted:

Kaivarta rebellion...was a critical event in the early history of Bengal. It temporarily ousted the Palas from their ancestral territory of Varendra and decisively weakened their control over subordinate rulers. It also paved the way for their fall in the hands of another power, the Senas, who rose after the event.
