= Varman dynasty (Bengal) =

Hindu dynasty of Bengal (1035–1150)

- 1035 A.D–1150 A.D
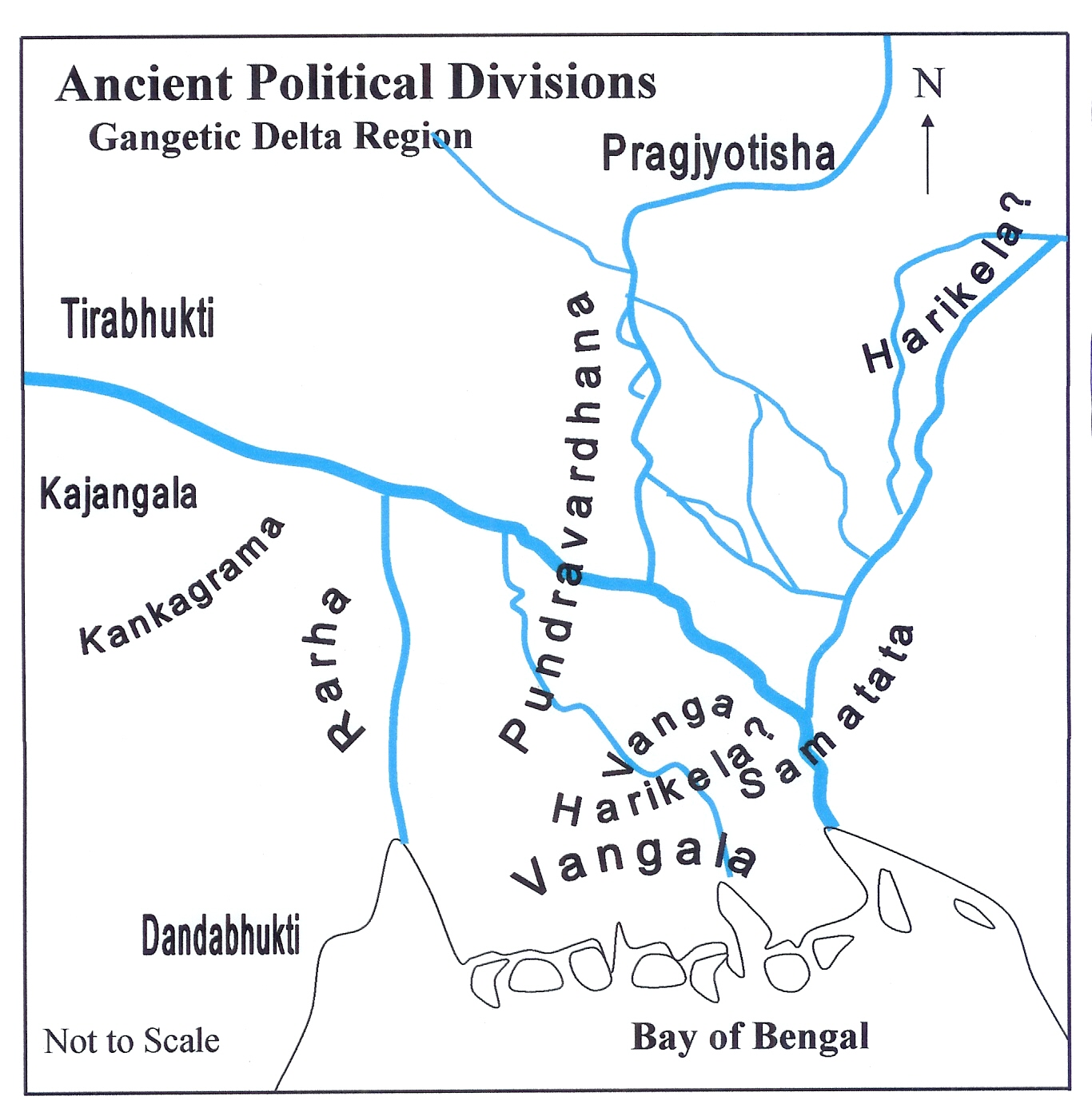
- Area ruled by the Varman dynasty (comprising the ancient regions of Vanga, Anga and Pundravardhana)
- Capital: Bikrampur; Champapuri
- Common languages: Old Bengali; Sanskrit
- Religion: Hinduism
- Government: Monarchy
- Maharaja
  - Unknown: Vajra Varman
  - 1046–1085: Jata Varman
  - 1085–1131: Hari Varman
  - Unknown: Samala Varman
  - Unknown: Bhoja Varman
- Historical era: Medieval India
  - Established: 1035 A.D
  - Disestablished: 1150 A.D
Preceded by	Succeeded by
Chandra dynasty	Sena dynasty

The Varman dynasty was a Hindu dynasty which ruled Bengal and later eastern Bihar (Anga) in the Indian subcontinent. The Varmans established their supremacy after replacing the Chandra dynasty. History of the Varman dynasty is known from three copperplates and the Bhuvanesvara inscription of Bhatta Bhavadeva.

== History ==
The Varmans most probably came to Bengal in the train of Kalachuri Karna's invasion of Vanga. According to D.C Ganguly, Vajravarman seems to have invaded southeastern Bengal from Orissa, probably following the same route as Rajendra Chola's army. It is quite likely that the Vajravarman accompanied Karna, stayed in Bengal, and at an opportune moment carved out an independent kingdom for themselves.

=== Early rulers ===
Vajra Varman was the earliest ruler of this dynasty and victory over Vanga was achieved under his leadership. According to R. D. Banerji and D. C. Ganguly Varman kingdom in eastern Bengal was founded by Vajravarman. The only record mentioning Vajra Varman's name is the Belava inscription, which praised him only as a poet, brave warrior, and an intellectual.

Adideva was minister of Vajra Varman, whose grandson Bhatta Bhavadeva served as the minister of war and peace under king Harivarman.

=== Jatavarman ===
Jatavarman was the son of Vajravarman and it is believed that Jatavarman accompanied Karna in latter's expedition of Bengal.

The reference to Jatavarman's marriage with Virashri, daughter of Karna, and to Jatavarman's war with Kaivarta chief Divya, who wrested northern Bengal from the Palas, help us in fixing the date of Jatavarman's rise to power sometime in between 1050 and 1075 AD. He attacked Varendra with a hostility towards Buddhism. Though the Kaivarta regime there did not suffer any loss, a part of Buddhist monastery of Somapura was destroyed by fire set by Jatavarman's army.

The account of Jatavarman's military conquests is given in the Belava plate of Bhojavarman. Jatavarman's marriage with Karna's daughter Virashri was significant and was perhaps a great factor in the rise of the political fortunes of the Varman dynasty.

Jatavarman's assault on Anga, as mentioned in the Belava plate, must have involved him in a struggle with the Pala Empire but he made himself powerful in the region after capturing the parts of Anga.

Jatavarman's other two adversaries were Govardhana and Jayapala, king of Kamarupa. He snatched away a part of Pundravardhana, then under the sovereign rule of Kamarupa.

=== Harivarman ===
Harivarman, under whom Bhatta Bhavadeva of the Bhuvanesvara Prashasti served as the minister of war and peace. On the basis of the colophon of the manuscript it can be assumed that Harivarman had a long reign of 46 years. It confirms to the information of the Bhuvanesvara inscription, where it is recorded that he ruled for a long time.

Harivaman, having seen Ramapala's success in recovering northern Bengal, propitiated Ramapala in order to avoid a Pala attack on his territory. It is doubtful whether Harivarman extended his rule towards Orissa. There is reference to a son of Harivarman both in the Bhuvanesvara inscription and Vajrayogini plate, but hardly anything is known about him.

=== Samalavarman ===
Samalavarman, another son of Jatavarman, was the next king. His name figures prominently in the genealogical accounts of the Vaidik Brahmins, who are said to have migrated to Bengal from Madhyadesha during his reign. There was matrimonial relation between the Varmans and the Lankan king Vijayabahu I; in all probability Trailokyasundari, daughter of Samalavarman, was married to the Lankan king.

Besides Bhojavarman, king Samalavarman had another son named Udayin, who is said to be a great warrior, whom none could approach in the battlefield.

=== Decline ===
Bhoja Varman, son of Samalavarman was the last independent ruler of Varman dynasty and the Belava plate was issued in his fifth regnal year from the jayaskandhavara situated at Bikramapura. He was defeated by Vijaysena of Sena dynasty and rule of Varmans over southeast Bengal came to an end.

== Culture ==
=== Religion ===
The Varmans were Hindus and followers of Vaishnavism. They centralised the worship of Vishnu and also Shiva, but held hostility towards Buddhism.
