= Jogendra Kishore Roy Choudhury =

Raja of Ramgopalpur

Jogendra Kishore Roy Choudhury was the zamindar of Ramgopalpur in Mymensingh.

== Biography ==
He was born in January 1858 a Mahishya family to Kashi Kishore Roy Chowdhury. He was known for his generosity and care for his tenants. He was fond of Sanskrit and would invite many of its scholars annually. He would support their work with donations. During his lifetime, he supported a number of technical schools in Mymensingh.

He married Hemlata, the daughter of Madhav Chandra from the Joari Bishi Zamindar family.

== Titles ==
The government of India conferred on him the title of Rai Bahadur in 1895, and in 1909, the title of Raja.
