= Varendra rebellion =

1070 CE revolt of Kaivarta chieftains against Pala rule in north Bengal

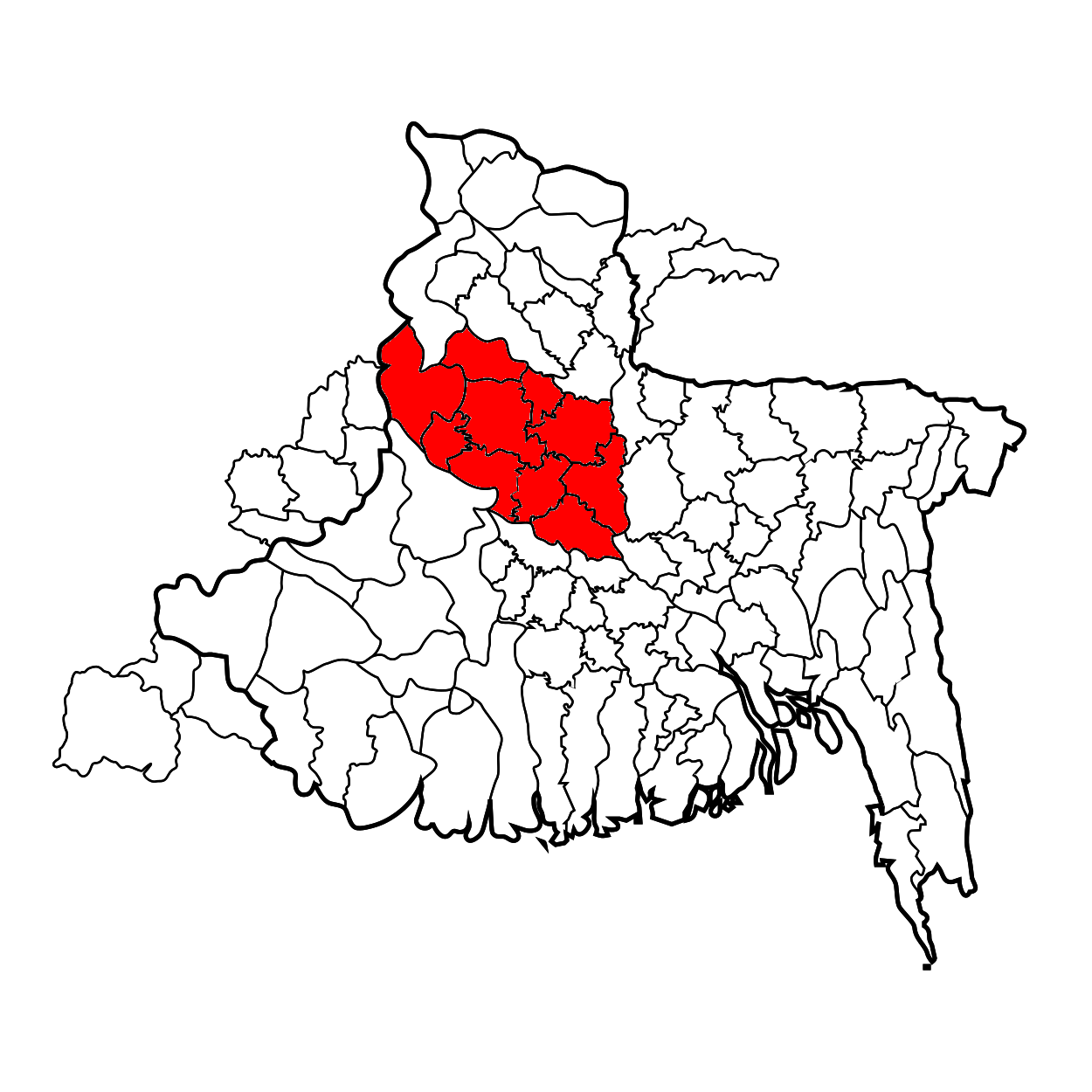
- Varendra region within Bengal
Date	1075 - 1082 CE
Location	Varendra (present day Dinajpur, Malda and Rajshahi regions)
Result	Varendra rebel victory: Varendra became an independent state for around 50 years; Collapse of the Pala Empire in Varendra, which substantially weakened Pala empire and subsequently led to its final decline; Assassination of Mahipala II; Capital punishment of Bhima after losing the final battle
Territorial changes	Varendra succeeds from the Pala Empire and becomes independent for a half century

Belligerents
Cāsi Kaivarta	Pala Empire

Commanders and leaders
Dibyak (Divya); Rudok; Bhima	Mahipala II †; Ramapala

The Varendra rebellion (also known as the Kaivarta revolt) was the revolt against King Mahipala II led by Kaivarta chieftain Divya (Dibyak), a feudal lord of Northern Bengal. The Kaivartas were able to capture Varendra by this rebellion. The revolt might have been the first peasant revolt in Indian history. However, the first phase of the revolt would more appropriately be described as a rebellion of feudal lords (samantas), who would have mobilized the peasants, and the last phase of the revolt was a spontaneous mass uprising.

The map of Pala dynasty during the reign of Dharmapala(violet)

== Sources for history of the rebellion and the dynasty ==
- Ramacharitam by Sandhyakar Nandi
- Bhaturiya Inscription of Rajyapala
- Belava plate of Bhojvarman
- Manahali Cooper plate inscription of Madanpala
- Kamauli copper plate inscription of Vaidyadeva
- Taranatha's history of Buddhism in India

== Identification of rebels ==
In the early ancient period the Kaivartas were rated low, associated with boatmen, fishermen, or else forest-settlers hunters and raiders like the Niṣāda or even the dāsas, or were described as a mixed caste—sankīrṇa jāti, or as antyajas. The Vaṃśānucarita of the Viṣṇu Purāṇa mentioned that a king of Magadha, having overthrown the traditionally accepted kṣatriyas would create new category of kṣatriyas. Romila Thapar notes that the list of other varṇas converted to Kṣatriya status through this process includes the Kaivarta. The Sultanpur copperplate inscription of the 5th century brings to light the presence of Kaivartaśarman in the local assembly (adhikaraṇa) as a member of Kuṭumbin (peasant landholders) in Gupta Bengal. Swapna Bhattacharya notes that in Varendra Kaivartas were represented not only as fishermen and cultivators, but Brahmins as well. R. C. Majumdar and RS Sharma mentioned the merger of this tribe or clan with Aryan or Brahmanical society and later getting affiliated with Mahishya, an offspring of Kshatriya father and Vaishya mother.

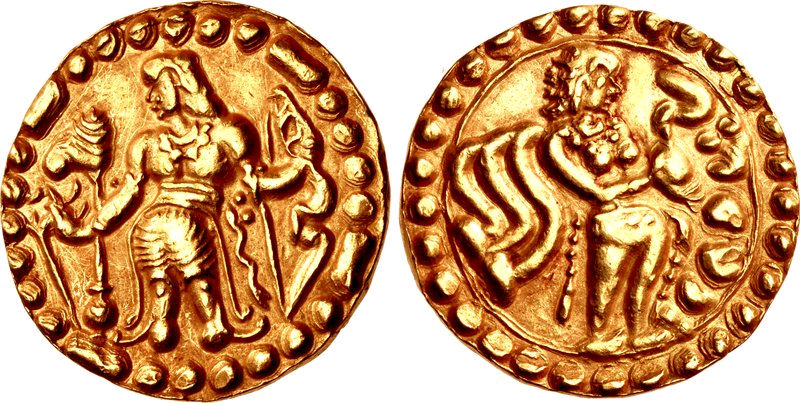
Coin of a king of the Kaivartas in Varendra, circa 640–730 CE.

The name of Kaivartas appeared in a grant of Gopāla II as one of the lowest categories of rural residents. There are reference to vṛttis of Kaivartas like Osinnakaivartavṛtti, Uddhannakaivartavṛttivahikala, in the copperplates of Mahīpāla I and Vigrahapāla III. According to Ryosuke Furui, these vṛttis or lands, given for livelihoods or some services, connote their settling in agrarian frontier and the growth of some section to a class of landholders. Furui further noted there might also be a diverse social group in Varendra labelled as "Kaivarta". The Kaivartas acquired the position of subordinate rulers through their association with the Pāla kings in the forms of military or other services and the appointment to administrative positions. On the other hand, Historians Vishweshwar Chakraborty and HS Kotiyal opined that Pala kings and rebel Samanta leaders both were Kaivartas or Mahishyas.

== Dynasty ==
=== Origin ===
SP Lahiry argued that Divya was from the family of Yasodāsa who was the prime minister in royal court of Rajyapala. This dāsa dynasty of Mahishya clan, of which Yasodāsa's ancestors Malhadāsa, Suradāsa, and Sanghadāsa were important members, were known for their wealth and prowess. When Yasodas was the prime minister, the king commanded allegiance with Anga, Vanga, Kalinga, Suhma, Pandya, Karnata, Gurjara etc. Yasodasa is said to have performed many humanitarian and religious activities in the form of excavation of tanks, construction of temples, monasteries, palaces and bridges etc.

Divya, Rudok and Bhima ruled Varendra for around half a century.

=== Divya ===
Divya held very high royal office, presumably commander-in-chief of royal army. The rebels responded to his call and were easily able to capture Varendra. Mahipala II was killed by the rebels and the Pala armies were forced to fall back. As a result, Varendra was declared a separate state by Divya, and he became the king of Gauḍa, the Pāla capital. During his rule Jatavarman of Varman Dynasty in Vanga attacked Varendra with a hostility towards Buddhism. Though Divya did not suffer any loss, a part of Buddhist monastery of Somapura was destroyed by fire set by Jatavarman's army. Divya consolidated his position in Varendra. He was a powerful ruler and invaded Ramapala's dominion. He left a peaceful kingdom to his Brother Rudok, but nothing is known of him.

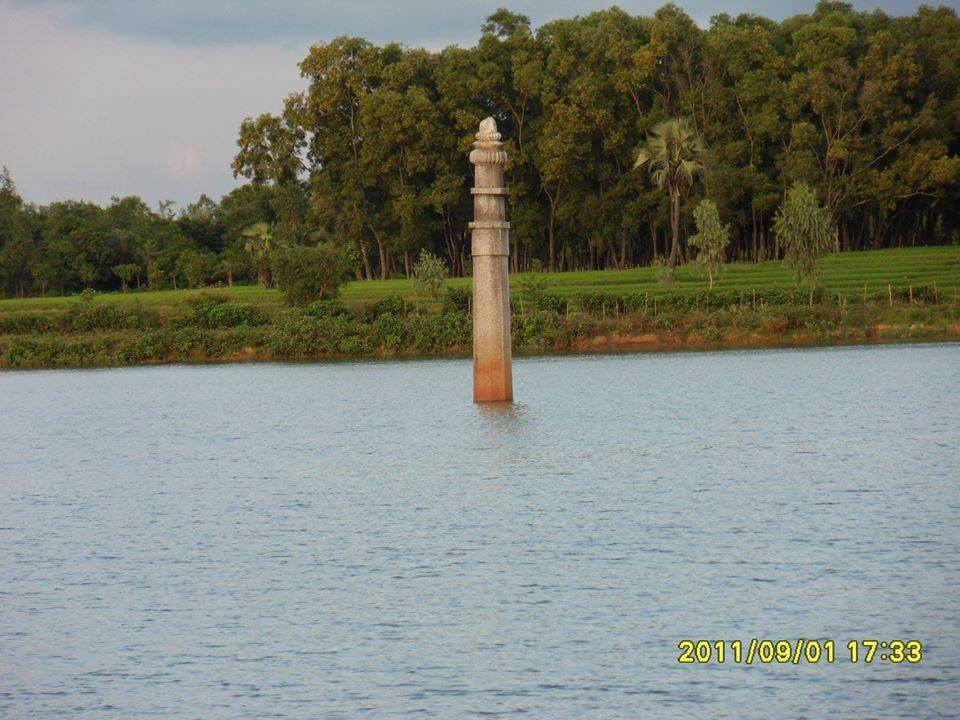
Dibar Dighi (Divya's Lake) was excavated and a granite pillar was commissioned to celebrate Divya's victory ( now in Naogaon, Bangladesh)

=== Bhima ===
Rudok was succeeded by his son Bhima, who successfully ruled the region for 30 years. After becoming the master of Varendri, Bhima, a popular king who is remembered still, reinforced the already well-established Kaivarta power. Bhima made the war-torn Varendra prosper. Bhima dispossessed Brahmanical and other religious agents from their lands, which were granted by Pala kings. He prioritised the interests of peasants who happened to be his kith and kin.

Dibyak Jayastambha or Kaivarta pillar is still standing in Naogaon District of Bangladesh as a sign of the dynasty. Bhima's Dyeing, Bhima's Jangal, Bhima Sagar, Bhima's Panti etc. in Varendra still bear his memory.

== Analysis of reasons and consequences ==
According to Debiprasad Chattopadhyaya, the Kaivarta rebellion is associated with the Siddha movement. The story of the Buddhist Mahasiddhas inspired them to revolt.

Romila Thapar mentioned that the rebels were associated with Buddhist and Tantric sects - Vajrayana which was popular then in the region. The rebels, who confiscated granted (agrahara) lands to Brahmins, were probably unhappy with royal patronage of Brahmins and brahminical institutions' growing influences on subordinate rulers and in rural society.

Ram Sharan Sharma described that Bhima had popular support of masses, but the samantas did not support him as the rebels were inspired by egalitarian spirit. Ramapala had to beg the supports of independent chiefs and donate them profusely in land and cash. Bhima's ill-equipped and untrained army of peasants and commoners were no match for the consolidated army of Palas, Rashtrakutas and more than a dozen samantas. After regaining Varendra Ramapala built temples of Bhavani and Shiva to pacify the Kaivartas; He also had to adopt mild taxation to appease the peasants.

Ryosuke Furui noted:

Kaivarta rebellion...was a critical event in the early history of Bengal. It temporarily ousted the Palas from their ancestral territory of Varendra and decisively weakened their control over subordinate rulers. It also paved the way for their fall in the hands of another power, the Senas, who rose after the event.
