= Ghoshnagor Union =

Ghoshnagor ঘোষনগর
- Union
- Location in Bangladesh
- Coordinates: 25.0290°N 88.821°E
- Country: Bangladesh
- Division: Rajshahi Division
- District: Naogaon District
- Upazila: Patnitala Upazila

Government
  - Chairman: Md. Abu Bakar Siddiq

Area
  - Total: 15 km^{2} (5.8 sq mi)

Population (2011)
  - Total: 10,000
  - Density: 670/km^{2} (1,700/sq mi)
- Time zone: UTC+6 (BST)
- Postal code: 6540
- Website: 9noghasnagarup.naogaon.gov.bd

Ghoshnagor (Bengali: ঘোষনগর) is a Union in Patnitala Upazila, Naogaon District, Rajshahi Division, Bangladesh.

== Demographics ==
It covers an area of about 15 square kilometers and has a population of about ten thousand (2016). Educational institutions include Ghoshnagor High School and Ghoshnagor Zongipir Shaheb Alim Madrasha. Other buildings include one rice mill, one community clinic, and twelve mosques.

== Administration ==
The Administrative Council of the Union consists of three women Members of the reserved women's seat and nine General Members under one chairman.

== Economy ==
Most of the people of Ghoshnagor union depends on the agriculture to earn their livelihood. The main crops are paddy, wheat, mustard seed, mango etc.

== See also ==
- Gaganpur
