= Rajya Pala =

Rajya Pala may refer to:

- Rajyapala (908-940 CE), seventh ruler of the Pala Empire of eastern Indian subcontinent, mainly the Bengal and Bihar regions
- Rajyapala Kamboja (10th century CE), founder of the Kamboja-Pala Dynasty of Bengal
