= Jogendranath Gupta =

Bengali writer

- যোগেন্দ্রনাথ গুপ্ত
- Born: 22 March 1883; Bikrampur, Bengal, British India
- Died: 31 May 1964(aged 81); Calcutta, West Bengal, India
- Occupations: Writer, historian, editor

Jogendranath Gupta (22 March 1883 – 31 May 1964) was an Indian historian, writer and editor of Bengali literature.

== Career ==
Gupta was born in 1883 at Mulchar village, Bikrampur, Dhaka in British India. He did not complete his studies due to financial hardship, and started working at a zamindar's office. He wrote articles since he was a student. In his literary career he wrote and edited more than 100 books in Bengali.

Gupta edited a child encyclopedia named Shishubharati and Koisharak magazine. He is well known for the works on historical development of Bikrampur. Gupta wrote number of biographies, poetry, historical plays and novels.

== Works ==
- Bikrampurer Itihas
- Bikrampurer Bibaran
- Bangalar Itihas
- Bharater Itihas
- Prithivir Itihas
- Bharat Mahila
- Banglar Dakat
- Dhruba
- Pralhat
- Bhimsen
- Himalay Avijaan
