= Nishikanta Chattopadhyay =

Bengali scholar (1852–1910)

- Born: July 1852; Pashchimpara, Bikrampur, Dacca district, Bengal Presidency
- Died: 25 February 1910 (aged 57)
- Education: University of Zurich; Leipzig University; Presidency College Calcutta
- Known for: First Bengali with a European PhD
- Notable work: The Yatras, Or The Popular Dramas of Bengal
- Relatives: Dwijendranath Tagore (co-father-in-law)

Nishikanta Chattopadhyay (July 1852 – 25 February 1910), also known as Nishikanta Chatterjee, was a Bengali scholar and the first Bengali to earn a PhD from a European University.

== Early life ==
Chattopadhyay was born in July 1852 to a Bengali Brahmin family in Pashchimpara, Bikrampur, then part of the Dacca district of the Bengal Presidency. He was the son of Kashiram Chattopadhyay. After completing his matriculation from the Progress School in 1868, he enrolled at the Presidency College Calcutta for the F.A. programme. In 1898, Chattopadhyay moved to London, Great Britain. He then joined the Leipzig University in Germany where he studied German, Sanskrit, history, linguistics, and philosophy. He was expelled from Leipzig University for being an atheist. Chattopadhyay completed his PhD from the University of Zurich in Switzerland. His thesis was titled The Yatras, Or The Popular Dramas of Bengal.

== Career ==
After completing his PhD, Chattopadhyay taught linguistics at Saint Petersburg State University for two years. He taught in different universities after returning to India. He created the Dacca-based Balya Bibaha Nibarani Sabha' (translation: Association for the Prevention of Child Marriage). He wrote in the Abala Bandhab against child marriages and for women's rights. He wrote a number of books in English and German.

== Personal life and death ==
Chattopadhyay's daughter was married to Sudhindranath Tagore, the son of Bengali polymath Dwijendranath Tagore. Chattopadhyay converted to Islam at a later stage in life. He died on 25 February 1910.

== Bibliography ==
- Popular Dramas of Bengal (1882)
- Some Reminiscences of Old England (1902)
- The Study of History (1902)
- Lecture in Zoroastrianism (1894)
- Reminisces of Justice Ranade (1901)
