= Gaganpur =

Gaganpur গগনপুর
- Village
- Location of Gaganpur, Patnitala, Naogaon, Rajshahi, Bangladesh
- Coordinates: 25°2′15.58″N 88°48′37.49″E
- Country: Bangladesh
- Division: Rajshahi Division
- District: Naogaon District
- Upazila: Patnitala Upazila

Area
  - Total: 22.39 km^{2} (8.64 sq mi)

Population (2011)
  - Total: 3,502
  - Density: 418/km^{2} (1,080/sq mi)
- Time zone: UTC+6 (BST)
- Postal code: 6540
- Website: 9noghasnagarup.naogaon.gov.bd

Gaganpur (Bengali: গগনপুর) is a village of Patnitala Upazila of Naogaon District in the Division of Rajshahi, Bangladesh. Gaganpur postal code is 6540.

== Transport ==
6.5 km east of Patnitala Sadar is adjacent to Gaganpur Bazar on Gaganpur-Nazipur road. Rickshaws, vans, CNG, etc.

== Education ==
=== Secondary schools ===
- Gaganpur High School

=== Colleges ===
- Gaganpur Technical and Business Management College

=== Madrasas ===
- Gaganpur Wazedia Fazil (Degree) Madrasah
- Hazrat Molla Ata Hafizia Madrasah

== Hospitals ==
- Gaganpur Health Complex, Gaganpur, Patnitala Upazila, Naogaon District

== See also ==
- Somapura Mahavihara (Paharpur)
- Nazipur
