= Patnitala Upazila =

Patnitala Upazila পত্নীতলা উপজেলা
- Upazila of Bangladesh
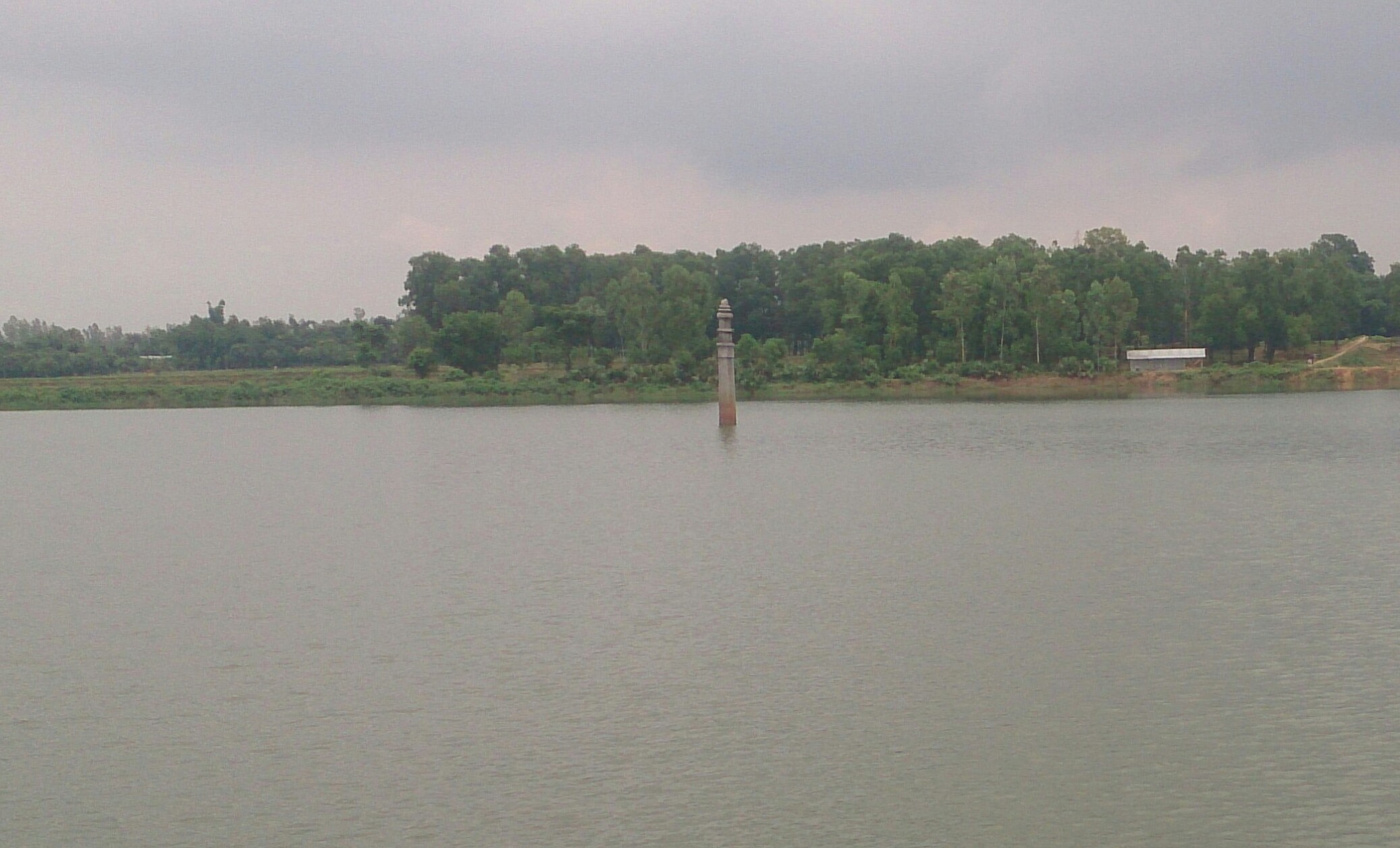
- A view of Dibog Dighi

- Coordinates: 25°3′N 88°44′E
- Country: Bangladesh
- Division: Rajshahi
- District: Naogaon

Area
  - Total: 382.38 km^{2} (147.64 sq mi)

Population (2022)
  - Total: 250,729
  - Density: 655.71/km^{2} (1,698.3/sq mi)
- Time zone: UTC+6 (BST)
- Postal code: 6540
- Website: patnitala.naogaon.gov.bd

Patnitala Upazila mauza geocode map

Patnitala Upazila (Bengali: পত্নীতলা উপজেলা) is an Upazila of Naogaon District in the Division of Rajshahi, Bangladesh.

== Geography ==
Map of Naogaon District

Patnitala is located at 25.0500°N 88.7333°E. It has 58,661 units of households and total area 382.38 km^{2}. The major rivers are the Atrai and the Shiba.

Patnitala Upazila is bounded by Dhamoirhat Upazila and Tapan CD Block of Dakshin Dinajpur district, West Bengal, India, on the north, Badalgachhi on the east, Mohadevpur Upazila on the south and Porsha and Sapahar Upazilas on the west.

== Demographics ==
Religions in Patnitala Upazila (2022)
Religion	Percent
Islam	78.84%
Hinduism	17.82%
Christianity	2.09%
Other or not stated	1.25%

According to the 2022 Bangladeshi census, Patnitala Upazila had 69,221 households and a population of 250,729. 7.71% of the population were under 5 years of age. Patnitala had a literacy rate (age 7 and over) of 76.18%: 77.70% for males and 74.67% for females, and a sex ratio of 99.36 males for every 100 females. 33,799 (13.48%) lived in urban areas.

According to the 2011 Census of Bangladesh, Patnitala Upazila had 58,661 households and a population of 231,900. 43,996 (18.97%) were under 10 years of age. Patnitala had a literacy rate (age 7 and over) of 52.55%, compared to the national average of 51.8%, and a sex ratio of 987 females per 1000 males. 21,670 (9.34%) lived in urban areas.

According to the 2022 census, total population was 250,729. Ethnic population was 17,893(7.14%) in which Oraon people was 8,017, Santal people was 3,898 and Munda people was 2,154.

Population of upazila by ethnicity (2022)
1. Bengali (92.9%)
2. Oraon (3.20%)
3. Santal (1.55%)
4. Munda (0.86%)
5. Others (1.53%)

As of the 1991 Bangladesh census, Patnitala had a population of 1 98 164. Males constituted 51.26% of the population and females 48.74%. This upazila's eighteen up population was 98279. Patnitala had an average literacy rate of 32.9% (7+ years), and the national average of 32.4% literate.

== Points of interest ==
Dibar Dighi is a large historic pond with a stone pillar, Kaivarta stambha, in its middle. Both date from the late eleventh century.

- Gahon Pirbabar Mazar, Patnitala
- Kancon, Hazarat Zahor Uddin Cistia Babar Mazar, Patnitala
- Katabari Mazar, Patnitala
- Atrai River, Patnitala
- Nazipur Pouro Park, Nazipur
- Paikbanda Shalbon
- More than Forest (Shihara and Nirmoil)

== Administration ==
Niamatpur Thana was formed in 1918 and it was turned into an upazila in 1983.

Patnitala Upazila is divided into Patnitala Municipality and 11 union parishads: Akbarpur, Amair, Dibar, Goshnagar, Krishanapur, Matindhar, Nazipur, Nirmail, Patichara, Patnitala, and Shihara. The union parishads are subdivided into 297 mauzas and 297 villages.

M P: Alhaz Shahidujjaman Sarker Bablu. Upazila Chairman: Md. Abdul Gaffar. Mayor of Nazipur Municipality: Rezaul Karim Babu (Balu Babu)

== Education ==
There are four colleges in the upazila. They include Chowrat Shibpur Barendra College; Nazipur Government College, founded in 1973; and Nazipur Mohila College (1995).

According to Banglapedia, Kantabari High School, founded in 1924, Nazipur Pilot High School (1930), and Sarlabala (Gandhi) Girls' School (1920), are notable secondary schools.

The madrasa education system includes seven fazil madrasas. Nazipur Siddikia Fazil Madrasha was founded in 1969.

== See also ==
- Districts of Bangladesh
- Upazilas of Bangladesh
- Divisions of Bangladesh
- Nazipur
- Gaganpur
