= Gopala IV =

Pala Emperor
- Reign: 1139–1153/54 CE
- Predecessor: Kumarapala
- Successor: Madanapala
- Dynasty: Pala
- Father: Kumarapala

Gopala IV previously called Gopala III, was the successor and son to the Pala king Kumarapala in the Bengal region of the Indian subcontinent, and nineteenth ruler of the Pala line reigning for at least 15 years, proved by a manuscript currently at British library.

Gopala IV ascended the throne as a child, indicated by verse 30 of his Rajibpur copperplate, issued in 2nd year of his reign: Gopala IV "extends his own fame by raining dust of camphor playfully in his childhood." However, in the same copperplate, although Gopala IV was mentioned as Parameswara Parambhattraka Maharajadhiraja, Madanapala was mentioned as rajah and royal minister, moreover that year was also noted as 2nd year of Madanapala's reign. Ryosuke Furui considers this to be the proof of Madanapala's regency for his young nephew. The Bihar Hill image inscription, dated Madanapala's year 3, refers to the 'victorious' reign of Madanapala, while the Nongadh pedestal inscription, dated year 1201 Vikrama Era equivalent to his year 1 or 2, mentions only his name without indicating about his kingship. Furui concluded that Madanapala usurped the throne soon after the second regnal year of Gopala IV. However, Gopala IV had kept his presence until his 14th year in Bihar area, suggesting a parallel kingship.

Gopala IV was killed in a battle, although the battle was won. He was succeeded by his youngest uncle Madanapala.

== See also ==
- List of rulers of Bengal
