= Yasodasa =

Minister under the Pāla king Rājyapāla in the 10th century

- Born: Auamitla in Brhaddhatta
- Occupation: Mantri of Pala King Rajyapala
- Years active: 925 - 962 CE
- Parents: Sahghadasa (father); Sarasvati (mother)

Yasodasa (IAST: Yaśodāsa) served as the Prime Minister of the Pāla king Rājyapāla in the 10th century. He was later elevated to the position of Tantrādhikārin, an officer in charge of administration.

== Family ==
- Origin

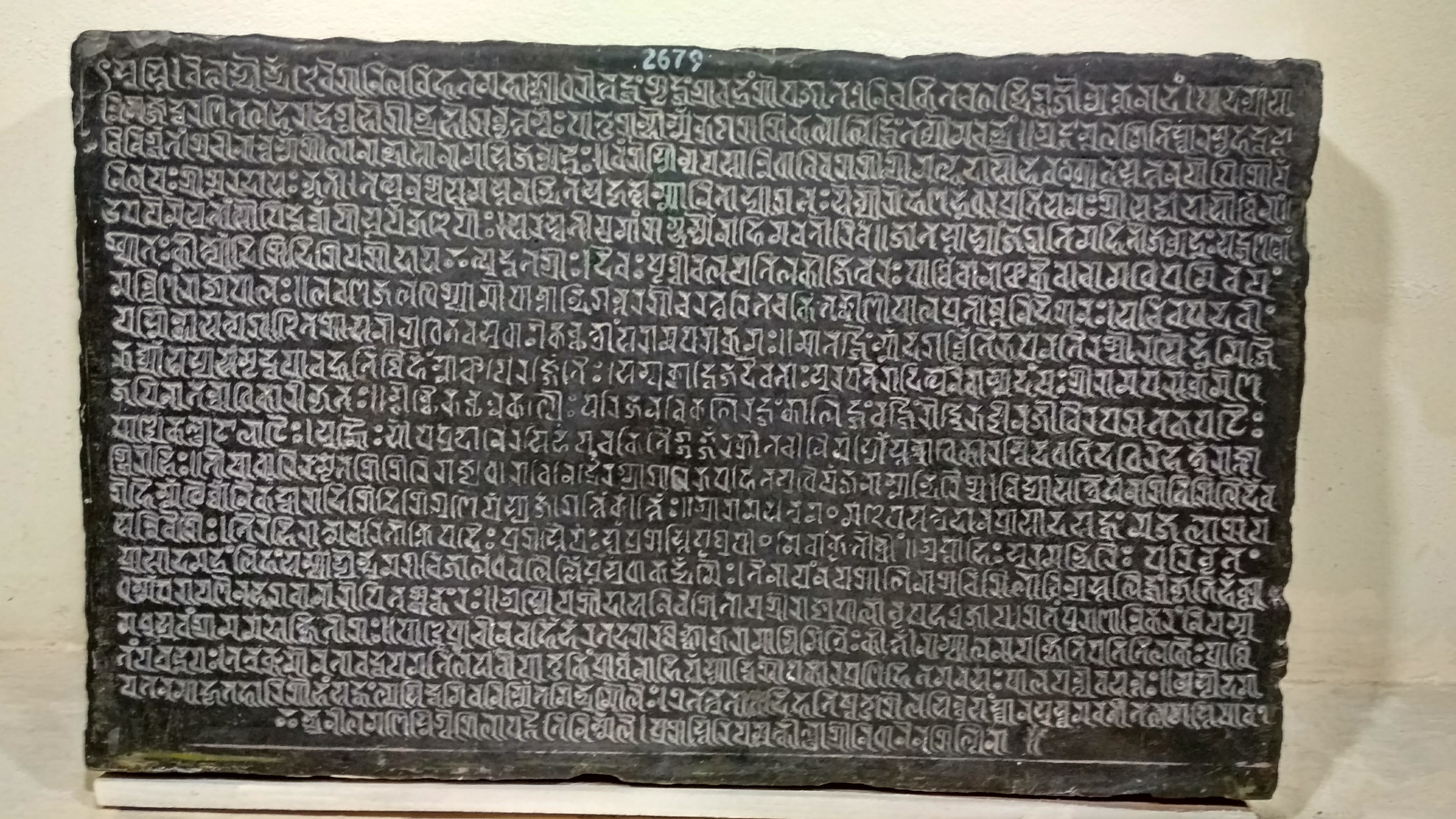
Bhaturia Inscription of Rajyapala

According to the Bhaturiya inscription of King Rājyapāla, Auamitla in Brhaddhatta is mentioned as the locality of the Dasa family resided. The precise location of these places remains uncertain, though they were likely situated not far from the site of the inscription, presumably in North Bengal.

- Lineage

The inscription provides an account of Malhadāsa, Suradāsa, and Sanghadāsa of the Dāsa lineage. Malhadasa, who is described with distinction and considered the earliest traceable ancestor of the family, appears to have been an important figure.

vinirgatāṁ suchināṁ dharma-śīlānām, daśanām asti janmabhūmiḥ। vaṁśe'smin payasā nidhau iva śaśī, śrī-Mālhadaso bhava-khyātaḥ, tat-suto'pi saurya-yuktaḥ॥

His son and grandson also gained recognition through their activities. Sanghadāsa's son, Yaśodāsa, emerged as the most renowned member of the lineage. The description of Yaśodāsa's father and grandfather indicates that the Dāsa family of the Mahishya clan was highly esteemed for its wealth and martial prowess. Through his personal qualities, Yasodasa secured appointment as the Prime Minister under King Rājyapāla. He was married to the daughter of Sriya Kanda and Dürydy.

== Career ==
Yasodāsa was a high-ranking official in the court of the Pāla king Rājyapāla in the 10th century CE. He initially served as a minister and was later elevated to the position of Tantrādhikārin, an officer responsible for overseeing administrative affairs.

"Jayinaḥ Tantrādhikāriṇaḥ kṛtalīlāḥ
ucchinna-kalpaiḥ parijana-vikalaiḥ
Aṅga-Kaliṅga-Vaṅgaiḥ Oḍraiḥ uddīna-jīvaiḥ apagata-kapāṭaiḥ"

According to the Bhaturiya inscription, during Yasodāsa’s tenure, Rājyapāla is said to have commanded allegiance from various regional powers and groups, including the Mlecchas, as well as the rulers of Anga, Vanga, Suhma, Kalinga, Odra, Karnata, Lāṭa, Pāṇḍya, and Gurjara. The text emphasizes that while Yasodāsa held the office of Tantrādhikārin, the king’s authority was acknowledged across these regions, reflecting the political aspirations and claims of the Pāla dynasty during this period.

The inscription records that King Rājyapāla granted the village of Madhusrava in favour of the deity Vṛṣabhadhvaja (Shiva), whose image had been installed by Yaśodāsa.

"asmai Yaśodāsa-niveśitāya śrī-Rājyapālo Vrşabhadhvajāya |
Satam purāṇān=nikaram niyamya Madhusravam grāmam=adāt kşitiśaḥ ||"

It specifies a fixed nikara of one hundred purāṇas (silver coins, also known as kārṣāpaṇa or dharana), apparently to be paid annually. While the purāṇa is a well-known silver coin, the term nikara is attested in Sanskrit lexicons as meaning "a suitable gift," and in Bengali, it has come to denote "an amount legitimately payable." The usage of nikara in this context reflects a broader practice of referring to small, symbolic amounts of rent for gifted lands with terms other than kara (tax), such as tṛṇodaka or agrahāra-pradeya-aṁśa. Hence, the inscription constitutes a form of kara-śāsana (tax regulation). Scholar N.K. Lahiry, however, misinterpreted this aspect by suggesting an emendation of nikara to niṣkara (rent-free), a correction that is considered unwarranted, particularly because niṣkara does not conform to the metre of the original verse.

== See also ==
- Rajyapala
- Dibyak
- Varendra Rebellion
- Pala Dynasty
