= Nazipur =

- Town and Municipality
- Location of Nazipur, Naogaon, Rajshahi, Bangladesh
- Coordinates: 25°2′29.24″N 88°45′37.96″E
- Country: Bangladesh
- Division: Rajshahi Division
- District: Naogaon District

Government
  - Mayor: Rezaul Karaim Babu(Balu Babu)

Area
  - Municipality: 12.14 km^{2} (4.69 sq mi)

Population (2022)
  - Municipality: 27,830
  - Density: 2,292/km^{2} (5,937/sq mi)
- Time zone: UTC+6 (BST)

Nazipur Municipality stands beside the Atrai River in the Naogaon District of the Division of Rajshahi, Bangladesh. It is one of the most important place & Business center of Naogaon district. It is near about 36 km away from the Naogaon city. It is a place of educated people, therefore there are many Schools, Colleges and Madrashas are established here. It is the Upazila sadar of Patnitala. In this Upazila, Coal mining & Ceramic mining are preset. Also this area works as a food production & supply center of Naogaon.

== Education ==
=== Primary schools ===
1. Al-Hera Islami Academy
2. Hatshaoli (Kanupara) Islamia Dakhil Madrasah
3. Nazipur Govt: Primary School
4. Chalkmomin Government Primary School
5. Horirampur Primary School
6. Puiya Primary School
7. OXFORD Pre-Caded & Kindergarten School
8. Holy Child Academi
9. Maloncha Kindergarten School
10. Saint Matthews English Medium
11. Raghunathpur Primary School
12. Fahimpur Primary School
13. Nazipur Darul Ulum Caowmia Madrasha
14. Nazipur Women's Madrasha
15. Kundan Primary School
16. Kashipur Primary school
17. Sunrise kindergarten school
18. Fulkuri Learner's Academy

=== Secondary schools ===
1. Al-Hera Islami Academy
2. Nazipur Government Model High School
3. Puiya High School
4. Nazipur Girl's High School
5. Nazipur Siddkia Fazil Madrasha
6. Chalknirkin High School
7. Babnabaj Darul ulum Dakhil Madrasa
8. Chalkmuli High School
9. Kundan High School
10. Goshnagar High School

=== Colleges ===
- Nazipur Government College
- Nazipur Women's College
- Nazipur Vocational School & College
- Nazipur Alim & Fazil Madrasha
- Polytechnic Institute
- Nazipur Institute of Engineering Technology, Nazipur Bazar, Patnitala.

== Press Club ==
Patnitala Press Club

Nazipur Press Club

== Hats-Bazar's ==
- Nazipur Natunhat
- Nazipur Puraton Bazar Hat
- Kashipur Hat
- Nazipur Patnitala Hat

== See also ==
- Somapura Mahavihara
- Patnitala Upazila
- Naogaon District
