= Shurapala II =

Pala Emperor
- Reign: 1075–1077 CE
- Predecessor: Mahipala II
- Successor: Ramapala
- Dynasty: Pala
- Father: Vigrahapala III
- Religion: Buddhism

Shurapala II (r. 1075–1077) was a ruler of the Pala Empire in the Eastern regions of the Indian subcontinent. He was the successor to the Pala king Mahipala II and fourteenth ruler of the Pala line, reigning for at least two years.

He, along with his younger brother, were locked in a bitter struggle with their elder brother Mahipala II, and were imprisoned. After Mahipala's defeat at the hands of Kaivarta chief Divya they escaped to East Bengal. R.D. Banerji states that silence of Ramacharitam about the death of Shurapala indicates that Shurapala was murdered by Ramapala, although R.C. Majumdar disagrees with this claim. He was succeeded by his younger brother Ramapala.

== See also ==
- List of rulers of Bengal
