= Nazipur Government College =

College in Patnitala Upazila, Bangladesh

- নজিপুর সরকারি কলেজ
- Type: Public
- Established: 1973
- Academic affiliations: National University
- Principal: Md. Syedur Rahman
- Students: 3,000
- Location: Patnitala, Naogaon District, Bangladesh; 25.0529°N 88.7635°E
- Campus: 6.83 acres (2.76 ha); Urban
- Website: ngcol.gov.bd

Nazipur Government College is a public college in Patnitala Upazila, Bangladesh. It is an honors level college, affiliated to National University.

== History ==
Nazipur Mahaviddalaya was established in 1973. The founding principal was Md. Moez Uddin. Initially it operated out of Nazipur High School. Land was donated to the college, a building was constructed, and in 1977 the college moved to its present location on the east side of the Nazipur-Dhamoirhat road in Patnitala. The college was nationalized in 1985, becoming Nazipur Government College. It is affiliated to National University.

Honors courses in Islamic history and culture began in 2007, but honors courses in other subjects could not be started because of severe and prolonged teacher shortages. The percentage of vacant teaching posts was 48%, 36%, and 21% respectively in the years from 2016 to 2018. Some positions had been unfilled for nearly a decade. There were no teachers in three departments, only one teacher in each of nine departments, and two teachers in the other departments.

== See also ==
- Chalkmuli High School
- Chalkmomin Government Primary School
- Naogaon Zilla School
