= Kumarapala (Pala king) =

Pala Emperor
- Reign: 1130–1139 CE
- Predecessor: Ramapala
- Successor: Gopala IV
- Issue: Gopala IV
- Dynasty: Pala
- Father: Ramapala

Kumarapala (Bengali : কুমারপাল) was the successor to the Pala king Ramapala in the Bengal region of the Indian subcontinent, and sixteenth ruler of the Pala line reigning for 10 years. During his reign, he put down an uprising in Kamarupa by the governor Timgyadeva, eventually replacing him with Vaidyadeva (who would rebel four years after the death of Kumarapala). He was succeeded by his son Gopala IV, who ascended the throne as a child.

== Biography ==
Kumarapala, one of Ramapala's three sons, took the throne after his father, as his other son Rajyapala had died earlier. During Ramapala's reign, the kingdom faced serious internal problems as well as attacks from neighboring rivals. One of these adversaries was Govindachandra of the Gahadavala dynasty, who managed to defeat Ramapala's forces in battle.

In an effort to ease tensions, Ramapala's uncle, Mathanadeva, tried to make peace by arranging a marriage between his granddaughter, Kumaradevi, and Govindachandra. Unfortunately, this alliance did not stop the continuous pressure from the Gahadavala side. Historical records show that Govindachandra pushed into important regions, such as the Gorakhpur district and western Patna. Inscriptions from that time mention his control over parts of South Bihar during the final years of Ramapala's reign, and even into the subsequent period when Kumarapala or his contemporary ruler held power.

At the same time, from the east, the Sena dynasty was expanding its territory. Their forces, along with those of other independent rulers in East Bengal, increasingly challenged the Palas. In South Bengal, a naval victory by Kumarapala's minister, Vaidyadeva, highlighted the ongoing conflict with these new powers. Moreover, the region of Kamarupa, once part of Ramapala's empire, rebelled under a local leader but was eventually subdued by Vaidyadeva, who later declared himself king. This led to the loss of Kamarupa for the Palas.

During this turbulent period, the Palas not only struggled to maintain control over their own kingdom amid internal discord, but also lost significant territories in East and South Bengal, as well as in Kamarupa, due to relentless external attacks.

== See also ==
- List of rulers of Bengal
