= Ramapala =

Pala Emperor
- Reign: 1077–1130 CE
- Predecessor: Shurapala II
- Successor: Kumarapala
- Born: 1057; Munger, Pala Empire
- Died: 1130 (aged 72–73); Munger near the Ganges, Magadha, Pala Empire
- Spouse: Madanadevi
- Issue: Rajyapala; Vittapala; Kumarapala; Madanapala
- Dynasty: Pala
- Father: Vigrahapala III
- Mother: unnamed Rashtrakuta princess
- Religion: Hinduism (Shaivism)

Ramapala (r. 1077–1130 CE) was the successor to the Pala king Shurapala II in the Bengal region of the Indian subcontinent, and fifteenth ruler of the Pala line.

== Early life ==
Ramapala was the youngest son of Vigrahapala III. His mother was an unknown Rashtrakuta princess, the sister of Mathana, who ruled Anga as a Pala feudatory. (Note: Mathana was the maternal grandfather of Kumaradevi, wife of the Gahadavala ruler Govindachandra.) Ramapala showed valour in the battlefield during the reign of his father, according to the Manahali copper plate.

Ramapala, along with his older brother Shurapala II, was locked in a bitter struggle with their oldest brother Mahipala II, who ascended the Pala throne after their father's death. They were imprisoned by Mahipala. However, after Mahipala's death at the hands of Kaivarta chief Divya, the brothers fled to distant parts of their kingdom, where they succeeded one another. Shurapala ruled for two years, before being succeeded by Ramapala.

== Reign and military career ==
=== Varendra Rebellion ===
At the very beginning, Ramapala reigned over a small territory comprising part of Magadha and Radha. But soon, according to Ramacharitam, he faced a new danger. According to R.C.Majumdar, this danger was the danger of losing even more territory to Divya. After discussing with his sons and ministers, Ramapala sprang into action.

Ramapala, with offers of gold and land, gained the support of powerful local chiefs. Being joined by large forces, Ramapala dispatched a force under his cousin and Mahapratihara Sivaraja, who crossed the Padma river and devastated Varendri. Then, Ramapala joined him with a large force. Bhima arrived with his army and a pitched battle took place. Both kings personally took part in the battle.

Bhima fought valiantly, but was taken prisoner from his mount. He was kept under the supervision of Ramapala's son, Vittapala. Bhima's army fled, and his camp was looted by Ramapala's soldiers. However, Bhima's friend Hari, usually identified with Harivarman, the king of East Bengal, rallied the forces around him. However, Ramapala's oldest son Rajyapala, who distinguished himself in the battle, managed to win him over with lavish gifts. Bhima, along with his family, was executed with a rain of arrows.

=== Conquest of Kamarupa and Rarh ===
After gaining control of Varendra, Ramapala tried to revive the Pala empire with some success. He ruled from a new capital at Ramavati, which remained the Pala capital until the dynasty's end. He reduced taxation, promoted cultivation and constructed public utilities. He brought Kamarupa and Rarh under his control, and forced the Varman king of eastern Bengal to accept his suzerainty.

=== Loss of Magadha and Mithila ===
Ramapala lost Mithila to a Karnat chief named Nanyadeva who formed his own kingdom based out of Mithila which became known as the Karnats of Mithila.

In the region of Magadha, Vallabharāja, an adventurer from Ratanpur led a campaign against the Ramapala with his base of operations in Bodh Gaya. It has been speculated that he was aided in his campaign by Govindachandra of the Gahadavala dynasty. After gaining control of Bodh Gaya he converted to Buddhism and took on the new name, Devaraksita. At this point, he made peace with the Palas by marrying the daughter of Mahana Pala (uncle of Ramapala). His dynasty became known as the Pithipatis.

=== Campaigns against the Ganga Empire ===
He also struggled with the Ganga king for control of present-day Orissa; the Gangas managed to annex the region only after his death.

Ramapala maintained friendly relations with the Chola king Kulottunga to secure support against the common enemies: the Ganas and the Chalukyas. He kept the Sens in check, but lost Mithila to a Karnataka chief named Nanyadeva. He also held back the aggressive design of the Gahadavala ruler Govindachandra through a matrimonial alliance.

A c. 1100–1125 manuscript of Ashtasahasrika Prajnaparamita, now in LACM, was copied in the Kurkihar monastery during the rule of Ramapala.

== Achievement ==
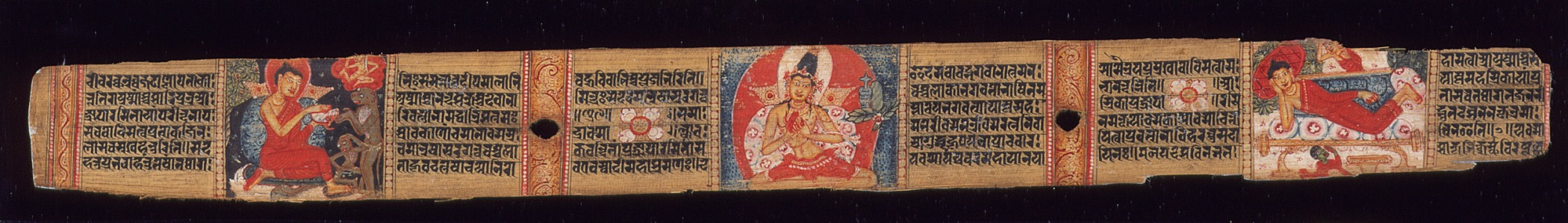
Maitreya and scenes from the Buddha's life. Folios were probably from the Pala period under Ramapala.

Rampala is recognised as the last great ruler of the dynasty, managing to restore much of the past glory of the Pala lineage. He crushed the Varendra Rebellion and extended his empire farther to Kamarupa, Orissa and Northern India. He was succeeded by Kumarapala. According to Bengali legend, he died by walking into the sea. Sandhyakar Nandi, the court poet of Ramapala wrote a Sanskrit two meaning base poem-like novel Ramacharitam.

R.C. Majumdar says,

A review of the main incidents of Ramapala's career, such as may be gleaned from contemporary records, reflects the highest credit upon his character and abilities. Beginning his life as an exile from his native land Varendri, and maintaining a precarious existence in a corner of his kingdom, Ramapala succeeded not only in re-establishing his sovereignty over the whole of Bengal, but also in extending his supremacy over Assam and Orissa. He crushed the power of a valiant and popular chief like Bhima and successfully guarded his dominions against such formidable foes as the Gangas, the Chalukyas, and the Gahadavalas. The author of Ramacharita says with legitimate pride that under Ramapala Varendri enjoyed peace for a long period, and no wicked person dared disturb her tranquility.

== Children ==
Ramapala had four known sons:

- Rajyapala, who was the crown prince and de facto ruler of the empire in the last years of his father's 53-year long reign. He probably died before his father.
- Vittapala, under whose supervision Bhima was kept after being imprisoned.
- Kumarapala, who succeeded his father as king.
- Madanapala, who was the last confirmed Pala king. He succeeded his nephew and Kumarapala's son, Gopala IV.

== Death ==
Ramapala was overwhelmed with grief after hearing the news of his uncle Mahana's death. Unable to bear the sorrow, Ramapala decided to end his life by walking into the Ganges near Mungyr. He had ruled for at least 53 years and was succeeded by his son Kumarapala.

== See also ==
- List of rulers of Bengal
