= Samanta =

Title used in ancient and medieval India

Samanta (Sanskrit: सामंत, IAST: Sāmanta) was a title or position used in the Indian subcontinent primarily from the 4th to the 12th century CE to denote a feudal lord, vassal, or tributary chief. The Sankrit root roughly translates to "neighbor". The institution is considered to be closely associated with the origin and growth of feudalism in ancient and medieval India. Such offices as zamindar, jagirdar, and mansabdar, among others, may be considered rough equivalents to the Samanta in the latter history of India.

The institution is known to have existed prior to the Gupta period, though details are vague. A Pallava inscription dating to the time of Santivarman (455–470 CE) uses the term Sāmanta-Chudamanayaha ("best among feudatories"). The term "Samanta" in South India usually referred to a vassal to a king or emperor. In North India, the earliest use of the term in a similar sense was in Bengal in the Barabar Hill Cave Inscription of the Maukhari Chief, Anantavarman (dated 6th century CE).

The earliest uses of the term "Samanta" occur usually in connection with various land boundary disputes in ancient India. Almost all rules regarding land boundaries and the resolution of border disputes were likely decided by the Samantas. Some historians believed that the Samantas' right to adjudicate on boundary disputes arose out of their ownership of the broader land, but such an interpretation does not stand scrutiny. Indeed, the term's meaning as a feudal lord only emerged gradually over time later in ancient India.

== Early development ==
The term 'Samanta' originally meant a 'neighbour' and in the Mauryan period, the term referred to the independent ruler of an adjoining territory as is evident from its use in the Arthashastra and Ashokan edicts. The 'border-lords' (pratyan-tanripati) mentioned by Samudragupta in his Prayagraj prashasti were such Samantas in the original use of the term.

However, the term underwent a change, and came to mean a 'vassal' by the end of the Gupta period and in the post-Gupta period. In fact, the institution of the Samanta was the main innovation that distinguished the post-Gupta period from the periods of ancient India. By the end of the Gupta period and by the 6th century the term Samanta came to be universally accepted as the Prince of a subjugated but reinstated tributary region.

Early kingdoms of Medieval India would surround themselves with a "Samanta-Chakra", that is, a 'circle of tributary chiefs'. By the time of King Harshavardhana, the institution of the Samanta had become well-developed and the Samantas came to be considered powerful figures. In order to integrate them into the hierarchy of the realm they were often given high positions in the court. One such example is the king of Vallabhi who was defeated by King Harsha and became a Maha-Samanta. This Vallabhi king then rose under Emperor Harsha to the position of a Maha-Pratihara (guardian of the royal gateway or the royal door-keeper) and went on to become a Maha-Danda-Nayaka (Royal Field Marshal). In effect, the institution of the Samanta brought rulers of fragmented or tribalistic, small independent regions under subjugation to serve the king or emperor as vassals.

The office of the Samanta represented a semantic change in state formation from an independent neighbour to a tributary chief and finally to a high ranking court official. Samanta title are used as a surname mainly among Bengali Hindu Mahishya and also among some Aguri.

== Types of Samanta ==
Banabhatta describes several types of Samantas in his work, Harsha Charita. Bana's Harshacharitra is the only work from which we know of various categories of Samantas. Bana mentions a large number of conquered enemy Maha-Samantas in the royal camp who were probably waiting to be assigned their new duties.

Some types of Samantas mentioned by Banabhatta are:

- Samanta: which signified the lowest and ordinary type of vassal.
- Mahasamantha (Maha-Samanta): a step higher than a Samanta.
- Shatrumahasamanta (Shatru-Maha-Samanta): a conquered enemy chief.
- Aptasamanta (Apta-Samanta): those who willingly accepted vassalage and the emperor as their overlord.
- Pradhanamahasamanta (Pradhana-Maha-Samanta): who were most trusted hands of the emperor and never disregarded their advice.
- Pratisamanta (Prati-Saamanta): who were opposed to the king and meant a hostile vassal. Though hostile, all Samantas had military obligations. If they did not fulfill their obligations, the king could seize their territory and appoint a new Samanta. Despite this, some Samantas would keep trying to throw off their allegiance to the king and assert their own independent rule.

Banabhatta uses the term Anuraktamahasamanta (Anurakta-Mahasamanta) only once and it possibly meant those especially attached to their overlord.

== Obligations of the Samanta ==
From the Harshacharitra, we understand that the Samanta had five duties. They are:

- Paying yearly tributes to the emperor.
- Paying homage to the emperor in person.
- Defeated Samantas had to offer their sons and minor princes to the Emperor so that they are groomed in the imperial traditions and grow to be loyal to the emperor.
- Render military aid to the emperor.
- Perform administrative and judicial functions in times of peace.

In the nature of rendering military aid, paying tributes and performing administrative and judicial functions, the office of the Samanta is comparable to the office of the Nayaka which was followed by the Vijayanagar Empire.

The Samanta system was followed by several kingdoms across north and south India.

== In South India ==
Some examples of Samantas in South India are:

- In the Hoysala empire, samantas were feudal chiefs paying vassalitic homage to the Maharaja and served the king as heredity governors. Some examples or names of the Hoysala heredity governors are Samanta Chattaya ruling Huliyara, Samanta Goyideva ruling Magare and Samanta Bankeya ruling Senavagere. Some such as Samanta Gandaraditya ruled over a larger territory of Arakere, Kaligunda, Kunduru, Belugere, etc. put together.
- In the Chalukya empire, the Banas under Vikramaditya Bali Indra Banaraja, the son of Balikula Tilaka Banaraja accepted the overlordship of the Chalukyas and proclaimed themselves as "Taruna Vasantham" and "Samanta Kesari".
- In the Kakatiya dynasty some examples are of Gonka I who rose to become a viceroy and Beta I (AD 1000 - 1050). Beta I emerged from a status of the Samanta Vishti Vamsa, Beta's son, Prola I, rose to become a Mahamandalesvara under the Chalukya King Someshvara. Further, the son of Prola I named Beta II (aka, Betha Raju) and his grandson named Prola II assumed princely status in the Kakatiya dynasty.
- The office of the Samanta was also passed on as a matrilineal inheritance. An example is the Paduva Panamburu inscription of AD 1542 which refers to one Kinnika Samanta being succeeded by his Aliya (elder sister's son), Dugganna Samant, a Jain Chieftain of Mulki. The Chiefs of Mulki served as Samantas and patronized Jainism.

== In North India ==
- The Samanta feudatories of Sagakula were called 'Sahi' and their overlord was called 'Sahanu Sahi' (King of Kings). The location of Sagakula is unknown. The Jaina saint Kalaka describes in his "Kalakacarya Kathanaka", that a group of Saka kings called Sahi kings were induced to come to India from 'Sagakula'. After crossing the Indus, they captured Kathiawar and Ujjayini and installed their own Sahi as the "King of Kings" and began a dynasty. The Sagakula were probably Saka-Kula Western Satraps who had been expelled from Seistan by Mitradates-II of Parthia.

== In East India ==
- Varendra rebellion was led by Chasi kevart(Mahishya) Samanta Divya, who mobilised the peasants against Pala rule and usurped Pala throne.
- It is suggested that Adisura ruled over a small portion of northern Bengal and Bihar as a Samanta king during the Pala rule.
- A samanta king (sub-ordinate ruler) named Sarangadeva or Kesari of the Somavamsi family is said to have probably ruled Sarang-Garh in Odisha.
- Bardhamman was ruled by a Samanta king, Ichai Ghosh or Iswani Ghosh of the Sadgop caste, which his descendents held as a zamindari.

== In Nepal ==
In the Nepali realm of the Maharaja of Licchavi, samantas held feudal domains and played a major part at court. Samantas played a role in other Nepali kingdoms as well.

Dr Regmi writes that in Nepal the Samanatas adopted high sounding titles such as Maharaja and Maharajadhiraja at a time when they were just Samantas (vassals). An example is an inscription in which a Samanta of Changu area, named Amsu-Varma, adopted the title of Maharajadhiraja. They were not seen giving up the title of Samanta even after adopting a higher sounding title. One such example is Mahasamanta Maharaja Sri Karmalilah.

Regmi compares this situation with the Indian side, where the title of Maharaja was used by both the king as well as his feudatories, such as the feudatory of Sasnaka in Midnapore, Sri Samanta Maharaja Samadatta, who ruled Dandabhukti of Utkala.

The position of a Samanta was also acquired by marrying into the ruling family. An example is Baliraja of Chaughan Rajasthanakot of Jumla who was made a Samanta Raja of the state after he married the daughter of Medinivarma who was the heiress of Semja. After marriage, Baliraja was virtually the head of all feudatory chiefs of the kingdom. This was elucidated in a copper-plate inscription of 1404 AD.

== Samanta Raju ==
This compound Indian title refers to a territorial vassal or governor (a person who provides military support and governs a territory) under a king or monarch in exchange for certain guarantees) in South India. This should not be confused with the titles given in the colonial British India.

== See also ==
- Zamindar
- Jagirdar
- Sardar
- Mankari
- Raja
- Feudal lord
