= Vigrahapala III =

- Pala Emperor
- Reign: 1041–1067 CE
- Predecessor: Nayapala
- Successor: Mahipala II
- Spouse: Yauvanasri; A Rashtrakuta princess
- Issue: Prahasitaraja; Mahipala II; Shurapala II; Ramapala
- House: Pala
- Father: Nayapala
- Religion: Hinduism (Shaivism)

Vigrahapala III (1041–1067 CE) was the successor to the Pala king Nayapala in the Bengal region of the Indian subcontinent, and twelfth ruler of the Pala line. He was succeeded by Mahipala II.

During the reign of Vigrahapala III, the Kalachuri king Karna once again invaded Bengal but was defeated. The conflict ended with a peace treaty, and Vigrahapala III married Karna's daughter Yauvanasri. Vigrahapala III was later defeated by the invading Chalukya armies of Someshvara I led by his son, the future Vikramaditya VI. The invasion of Chalukyas saw several soldiers from South India into Bengal, which explains the southern origin of the Sena Dynasty of Bengal & the Karnata dynasty of Mithila. Vigrahapala III also faced another invasion led by the Somavamsi king Mahasivagupta Yayati of Orissa. Subsequently, a series of invasions considerably reduced the power of the Palas. The Varmans occupied eastern Bengal during his reign. The emergent Sena dynasty seized Radha from the Palas, beginning the decline of their power in the region.

The Palas continued to patronise Shaivism, and epigraphic evidence suggests that Mahipala I and Nayapala were initiated as Shaivites by their royal preceptors. Vigrahapala III's Amagachi inscription describes him as "devoted to Śiva worship", and this tradition continued under his successor Ramapala. Poet Sandhyakar Nandi describes Ramapala's son Madanapala as a devotee of Shiva.

He was succeeded in quick succession by his three sons, starting with Mahipala II in 1070. The existence of another son named Prahasitaraja was confirmed by the Bangaon copper plate. Although this prince did not ascend the throne, he served as minister during his father's reign.

== See also ==
- List of rulers of Bengal
