= Madanapala (Pala dynasty) =

Pala Emperor
- Reign: 1139–1161
- Predecessor: Gopala IV
- Successor: Govindapala
- Spouse: Chitramatika Devi
- Dynasty: Pala
- Father: Ramapala
- Mother: Madanadevi
- Religion: Hinduism (Shaivism)

Madanapala (r. 1139–1161 CE) was the successor to the Pala king Gopala IV in the Bengal region of the Indian subcontinent, and the eighteenth and final ruler of Pala lineage reigning for 18 years. He was succeeded by Govindapala, whose lineage of that name is questionable.

== Reign ==
Madanapala was the youngest son of Ramapala and his wife Madanadevi. In the copperplate of the 2nd year of Madanapala's nephew Gopala IV's reign, although Gopala IV was mentioned as Parameswara Parambhattraka Maharajadhiraja, Madanapala was mentioned as rajah and royal minister, moreover that year was also noted as 2nd year of Madanapala's reign. Ryosuke Furui considers this to be the proof of Madanapala's regency for his young nephew. The Bihar Hill image inscription, dated Madanapala's year 3, refers to the 'victorious' reign of Madanapala, while the Nongadh pedestal inscription, dated year 1201 Vikrama Era equivalent to his year 1 or 2, mentions only his name without indicating about his kingship. Furui concluded that Madanapala usurped the throne soon after the second regnal year of Gopala IV. However, Gopala IV had kept his presence until his 14th year in Bihar area, suggesting a parallel kingship.

Madanapala began his reign gloriously, recapturing Mungyr from the Gahadavala king. His inscription from Bihar sharif, Jayanagar and Nongadh shows his control over South Bihar. Madanapala is said to have destroyed or dethroned a king named Govardhana, who was probably a regional king in East Bengal. Vijaysena seized North Bengal from him some time after his 8th regnal year.

Since the Senas, the Gahadavalas, and the Karnata rulers of Mithila all claimed territories belonging to Madanapala right after the 22nd year of his reign, R.C. Majumdar concludes that when Madanapala died, the Palas had ceased to exercise any sovereignty in Western, Southern, and Eastern Bengal, and in Western and Northern Bihar. In other words, the Pala kingdom was confined to Central, Eastern Bihar and Northern Bengal. Within a few years of Madanapala's death, the descendants of Dharmapala and Devapala, if any, were driven away even from this last refuge by the Senas, and the Palas passed out of history.

== See also ==
- List of rulers of Bengal
