= Rajyapala =

Pala emperor from 925 to 962

Pala Emperor
- Reign: 925–962 CE
- Predecessor: Narayanapala
- Successor: Gopala III
- Spouse: Bhagyadevi (Rashtrakuta princess)
- Issue: Gopala III
- Dynasty: Pala
- Father: Narayanapala
- Mother: Mamma, daughter of Govindaraja (Note: Nothing is known about Govindaraja beyond his name, which is mentioned on the Bharat Kala Bhaban inscription. Historian S. Subramonia Iyer considered an identification with the Chahamanas ruler Govindaraja II, though believed this unlikely due to his being allied with the Palas' rivals, the Gurjara-Pratiharas, as well as for the former being in decline during this period. According to historian Ryosuke Furui, all that can be said of Govindaraja is that he was a ruler, small or great, notable enough to be mentioned as father of the queen.)
- Religion: Hinduism

Rajyapala (r. 925–962) was the eighth emperor of the Pala dynasty. He succeeded his father Narayanapala. He reigned for 32 years. The Bharat Kala Bhaban inscription is dated in his 2nd regnal year. He was succeeded by his son Gopala III.

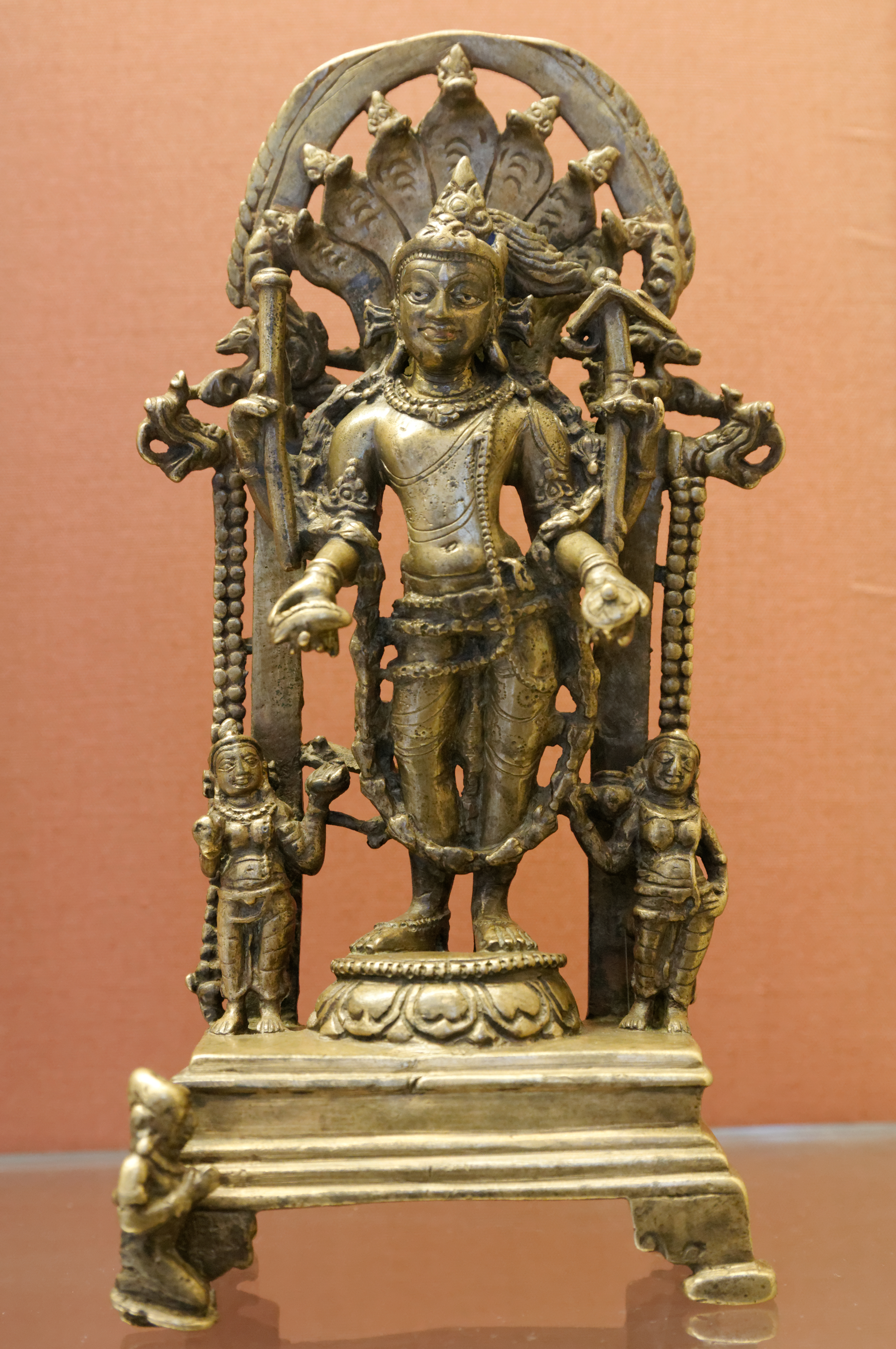
Standing figure of Balarāma, one of the incarnations of Vishnu. Dated from an inscription to the 14th regnal year of Rajyapala

== See also ==
- List of rulers of Bengal
- Yasodasa (Minister of king Rajyapala)
