= Mahipala II =

Pala Emperor
- Reign: 1070–1075 CE
- Predecessor: Vigrahapala III
- Successor: Shurapala II
- Dynasty: Pala
- Father: Vigrahapala III
- Mother: Yauvanashri devi of Chedi kingdom
- Religion: Buddhism

Mahipala II was the successor to the Pala king Vigrahapala III in the Bengal region of the Indian subcontinent, and thirteenth ruler of the Pala line reigning for six years. He was succeeded by Shurapala II.

Mahipala II was locked in a bitter conflict with his ambitious younger brothers, Surapala and Ramapala. He imprisoned them early in his reign. The common people were also oppressed during his rule. Mahipala had to face a well-organised rebellion of his vassal chiefs. Mahipala’s army was small and ill-equipped, but he advanced to fight the rebels. He was defeated and killed by the rebels under the leadership of Dibyak. The rebels occupied the capital, and Surapala and Ramapala fled the city.

== See also ==
- List of rulers of Bengal
