= Varendra =

Region in northern Bengal

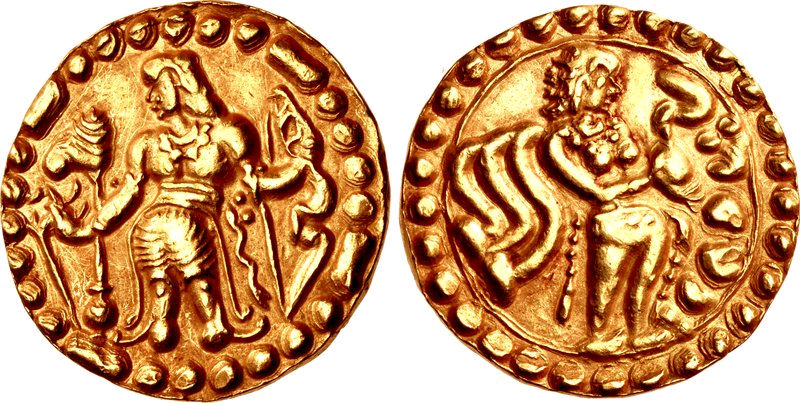
Coin of a king of the Kaivartas in Varendra, circa 640–730 CE.

Varendra (Bengali: বরেন্দ্র), also known as Barind (Bengali: বরিন্দ), was an ancient and historical territory of Northern Bengal, now in Bangladesh and the Indian state of West Bengal with parts in Eastern Bihar.

It formed part of the Pundravardhana or Pundra Kingdom region currently part of the Rajshahi and Rangpur Division of Bangladesh and included the districts of Bogra,Naogaon, Rajshahi, Pabna and Dinajpur of Bangladesh and the districts of Uttar Dinajpur, Dakshin Dinajpur and Malda of West Bengal, India. According to Cunningham, the boundary of Varendra was the Ganges and the Kosi river on the west, the Karatoya on the east, the Padma River on the south and the land between Cooch Behar and included the Terai.

== Literature and inscriptions ==
According to R. C. Majumdar, the term Varendra-mandala occurs in the Ramacharitam, which places it between the Ganges and Karatoya rivers. He writes, "Its inclusion with Pundravardhana is proved by the Silimpur, Tarpandighi and Madhainagar inscriptions. The Tabaquat-i-nasiri mentions Barind as the wing of the territory of Lakhnawati on the eastern side of Ganges".

== History ==
Historical evidence attests significant presence of Brahmins in Bengal during the Maurya period. The Jain Acharya Bhadrabahu, regarded to be the preceptor of Sthulabhadra, is said to have been born in the Brahmin family of Pundravardhana (or Puṇḍra, the region north of the Ganges and west of Brahmaputra in Bengal, later known as Vārendra). Such evidences suggest Puṇḍra or Vārendra and regions west of Bhagirathi (called Radha in ancient age) to be seats of Brahmins from ancient times.

== Modern usage ==
- Varendra Research Society
- Varendra Research Museum
- Varendra rebellion
- Varendra University
- Varendra tract

== See also ==
- North Bengal
- Pundravardhana
