= Karnats of Mithila =

Medieval dynasty that ruled the Mithila region (1097–1324)

Karnatas of Mithila Karnata dynasty Tirhut Sarkar
- 1097–1324
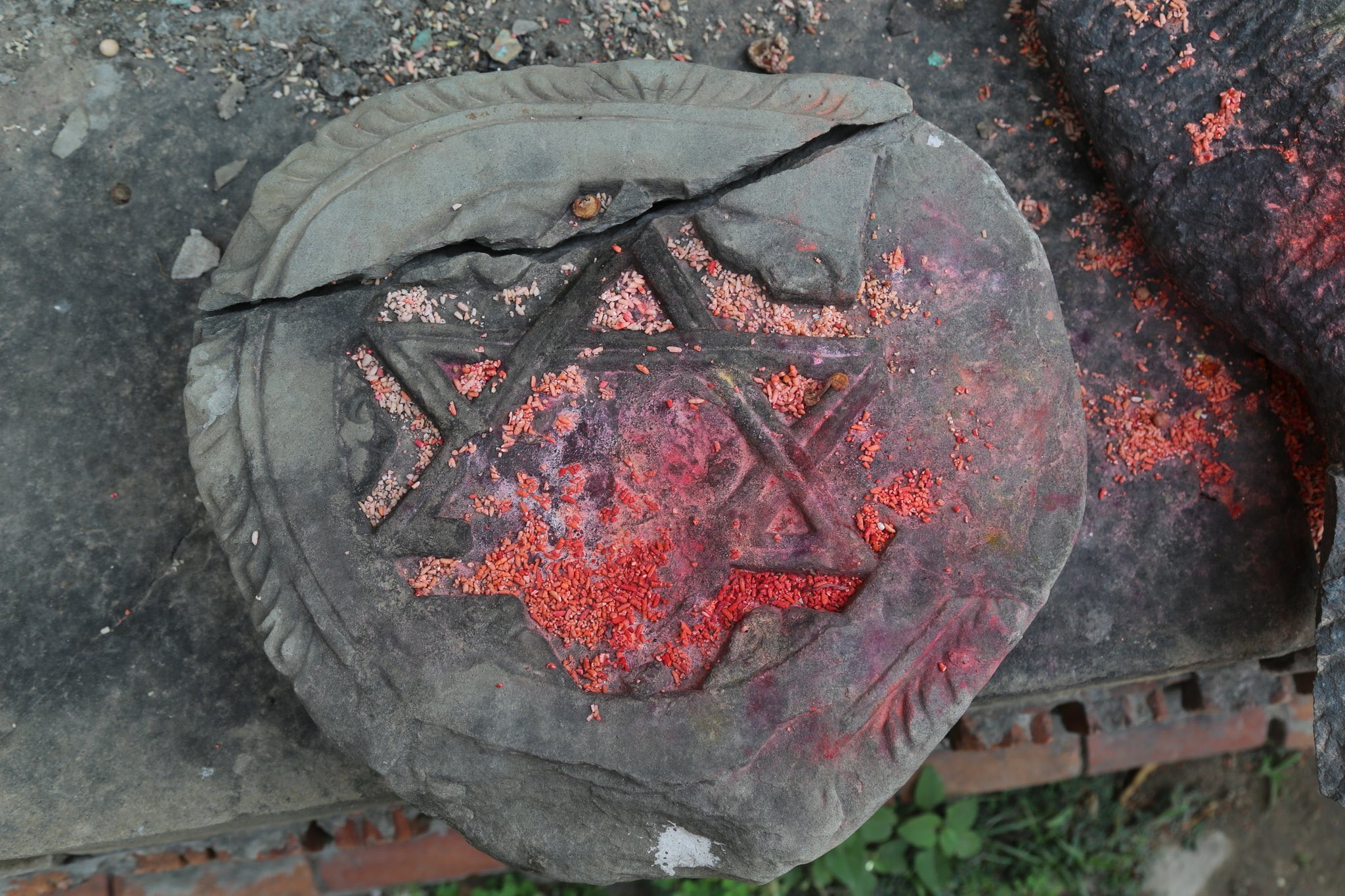
- Shatkona seal from the Karnat capital of Simraungadh

- Approximate location of the Karnata dynasty, with contemporary polities circa 1250.
- Capital: Nanapura (pre-1097 CE); Simraungadh (post-1097 CE); Darbhanga (Second capital)
- Common languages: Sanskrit; Maithili; Abahatta
- Religion: Hinduism; Buddhism
- Demonym: Maithil
- Government: Monarchy
  - Geopolitical entity: Tirhut Sarkar
- Historical era: Medieval India
  - Established: 10 July 1097
  - Disestablished: 1324
Preceded by	Succeeded by
Pala Empire	Delhi Sultanate; Oiniwar dynasty

The Karnats of Mithila or Karnata dynasty (Karṇāṭa) was a dynasty established in 1097 CE by Nanyadeva. The dynasty controlled the areas we today know as Tirhut or Mithila in Bihar, India and adjoining parts of South Eastern Nepal. The main power centre of the Karnats was the citadel of Simraungadh which was situated on the India - Nepal border. The city of Darbhanga also became the second capital during the reign of Gangadeva.

According to French orientalist and indologist Sylvain Lévi, Nanyadeva established his supremacy over Simraungadh probably with the help of the Chalukya king Vikramaditya VI. After the reign of Vikramaditya VI in 1076 CE, he led a successful military campaign against the Pala Empire and the Sena dynasty. During the reign of Harisimhadeva, the Karnats also carried out raids into Nepal with the Karnat army under the leadership of the general and minister, Caṇḍeśvara Ṭhakkura.

Under the Karnats, Mithila enjoyed almost full sovereignty from 1097 until 1324. The Karnat kings referred to themselves with the title of Mithileśwara and the first recorded piece of Maithili literature, the Varna Ratnakara was also composed during their rule.

== History ==
=== Origins ===
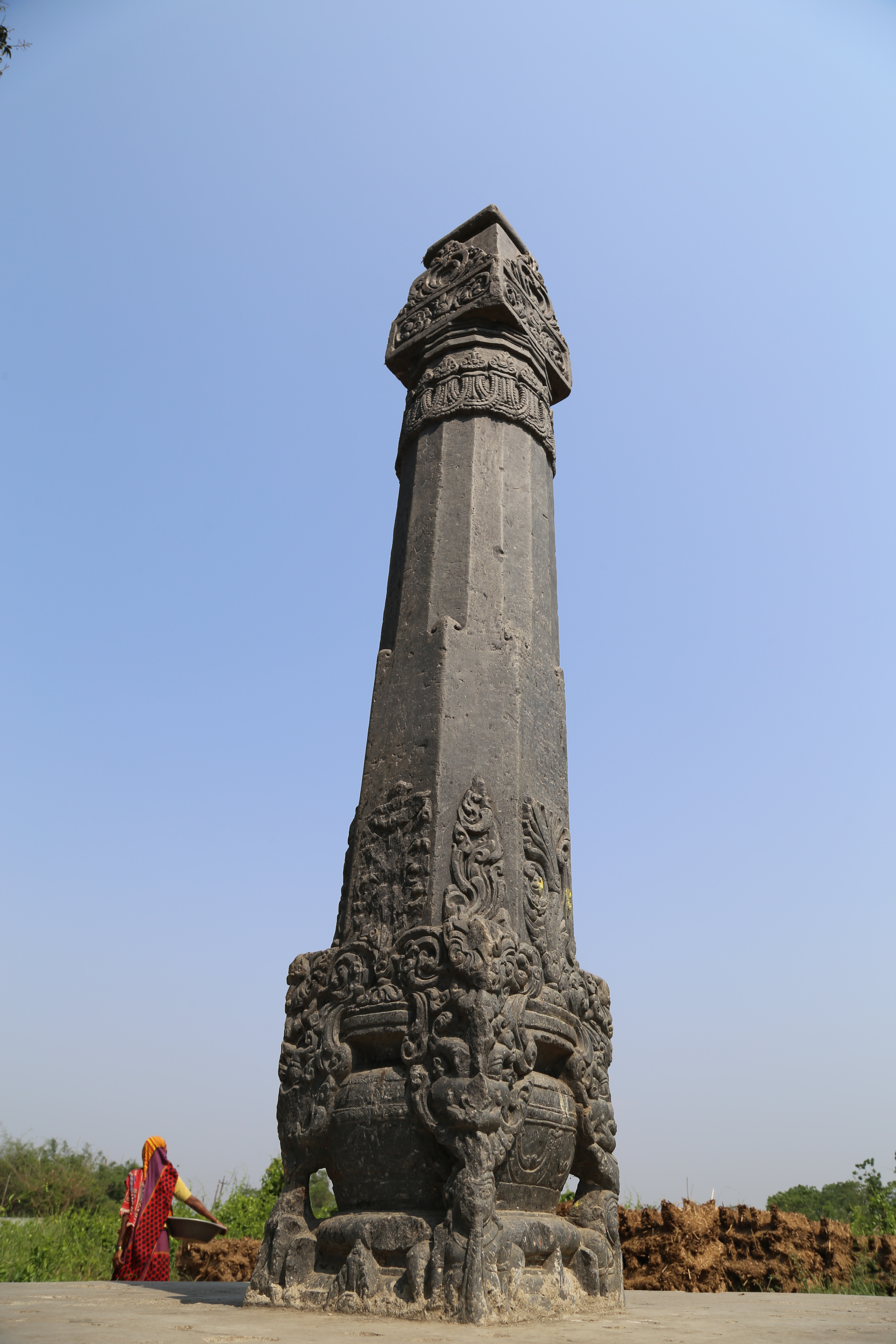
Pillar at Simraungadh

The origins of Nanyadeva, the founder of the Karnat dynasty, likely lie within South India. Sena dynasty inscriptions refer to Nanyadeva as Karnata-Kulabhusana indicating that he had his origins in the South and likely arrived in the North through the Chalukya invasions. His ancestors were petty chieftains and adventurers in Eastern India who arrived in the territory of the Pala Empire to work as officials and later carved out their own principalities while also asserting their independence. Nanyadeva was possibly one of a number of Karnata-origin officers who worked for the Pala Empire. In the wake of the Varendra rebellion, the Palas grip on the region was substantially weakened and this provided an opportunity for Nanyadeva to assert his independence.

When Nanyadeva first arrived in the region in 1093 A.D., he originally established his stronghold in Nanapura in Champaran and referred to himself as Mahashamantadhipati as confirmed by the local traditions of Mithila. The title suggests that he was likely originally a commander in the Chalukaya army. He later shifted his capital to Simraungadh.

=== Nanyadeva's reign ===
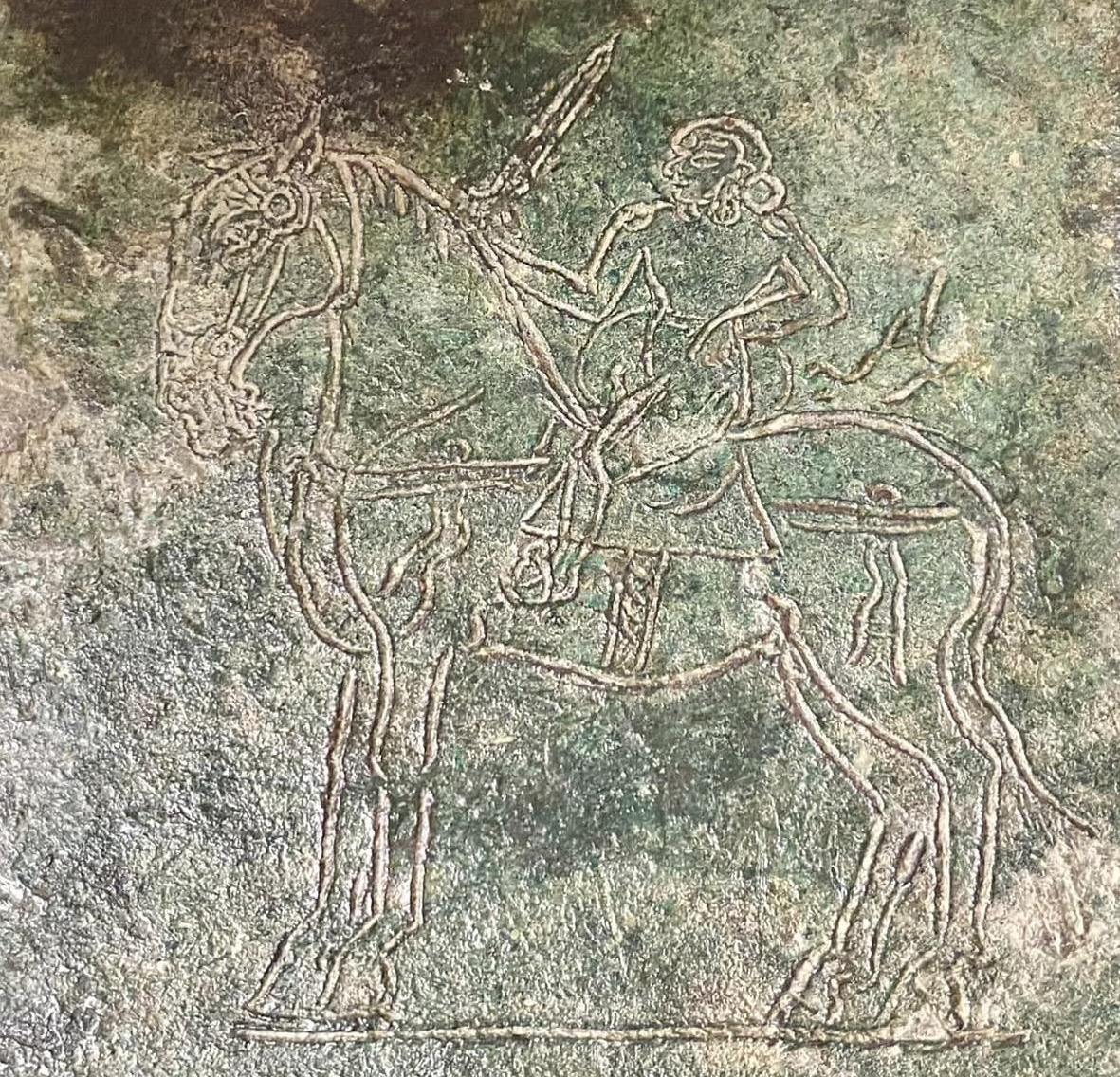
Image of a horseman from 12th century land grant of Nanyadeva

The reign of Nanyadeva can be precisely dated by an inscribed stone pillar at Simraungadh which says, translated into English, "In the Śaka year 1019, on Saturday, the 7th of śrāvaṇa, in the śvāti nakṣatra, king Nānyadeva took the land." This corresponds to a date of 10 July 1097 CE. (Note: A slightly different date – 18 July 1097 – is given in the Nepalese Muditakuvalayāśva, which was written by Jagjyotiramala in 1628.)

Parts of the Mithila region had formerly belonged to the Kalachuris of Tripuri. At some point (probably c. 1122), the Kalachuri king Yashahkarna appears to have invaded in an attempt to recapture the territory. Based on the Berighati inscription, it seems that Yashahkarna's invasion caused significant devastation to the region but was ultimately unsuccessful, and after his retreat in 1124 or 1125, the Kalachuris made no more attempts to reconquer the region.

Another event that happened during Nanyadeva's reign was a clash of some sort with the Sena ruler Vijayasena, possibly because both of them were trying to win territory in the east. The Deopara inscription, authored by the poet Umapatidhara under Vijayasena's direction, describes Nanyadeva as a "defeated hero" who Vijayasena took as a prisoner. It says nothing about Vijayasena conquering Mithila, though, so while he may have inflicted a major defeat on Nanyadeva, Nanyadeva remained an independent ruler. Whatever the exact nature of this event, it seems to have left Nanyadeva a "negligible factor in North Indian politics" compared to the Senas and Gahadavalas.

At some point, possibly after the tussle with Vijayasena, Nanyadeva got involved in the Nepal region. According to Upendra Thakur, Nanyadeva may have championed Śivadeva, a prince of the Thakuri dynasty (which had been dethroned by another branch by around 1080), in his bid for the throne. By doing so, he expanded his own influence in Nepal. According to Sinha, the relationship between Nanyadeva and Śivadeva (who ruled between c. 1118 and 1123) is more uncertain – Nanyadeva may have supported Śivadeva, but they may have also been rivals. The nature of Nanyadeva's authority in Nepal is also unclear. According to Thakur, Nanyadeva probably had "a loose sort of hegemony over the princes of Nepal", with the local princes recognising his nominal suzerainty but otherwise remaining mostly independent.

According to local tradition, Nanyadeva's original capital was at Nānyapura in the present-day Champaran districts of Bihar, where ruins are still visible. Nepalese tradition, on the other hand, says Nanyadeva had his capital at Simraungadh. Whenever the shift happened, Simraungadh went on to serve as the main capital for the later Karnat rulers, while Nānyapura ended up becoming abandoned, and no later traditions or documents mention it.

Nanyadeva also apparently wrote a commentary on the Nāṭyaśāstra.

=== Gangadeva and Malladeva ===
Nanyadeva was succeeded by his two sons, Gangadeva and Malladeva. It is likely that Gangadeva continued rule in Mithila while Malladeva maintained dominion over the territories in northeast Mithila and Nepal. Malladeva kept his stronghold in the village of Bheeth Bhagwanpur in what is now Madhubani district. The 15th-century poet, Vidyapati asserted in his writings that Malladeva was a "valiant warrior" and he spent time in the kingdoms of the neighbouring Gahadavala dynasty and the Pithipatis of Bodh Gaya. It was during this period that the Thakuri dynasty of Nepal asserted their independence leading to the loss of much of the Karnata territory in Nepal.

The Ramacharitam attests to the invasion of the Gauda region by Gangadeva during his rule in Mithila at some point after 1147 CE which during this period was held by Madanapala. After Madanapala's death, the Sena dynasty came into power in Bengal and there is uncertainty as to whether Gangadeva fought with Vijaya Sena and his successors. On the whole, Gangadeva's reign over Mithila can be characterised as peaceful as the Sena dynasty was occupied with war with the Gahadavalas. This allowed Gangadeva to introduce internal reforms including the introduction of the Pargana system for revenue collection. He instituted the post of Chaudhary in the parganas of his territory for the purpose of the revenue collection. The Mulla Taqia also details that Gangadeva shifted the capital to the city of Darbhanga.

=== Narsimhadeva's reign ===
Narsimhadeva succeeded his father to the throne of Mithila in 1188 CE. His reign has been characterised as one of turbulence. One of the main sources of information regarding Narsimhadeva is the Puruṣaparīkṣā of Vidyapati which was written in the 13th/14th century. This source tells us that a "Narasimhadeva of the Karnata race" along with a "Cacikadeva Cauhāna", assisted the Sultan of Delhi. This Sultan has been identified with Muhammad of Ghor who conquered Delhi in 1193 CE. There is, however, no evidence that the Karnatas were subservient to the Sultan of Delhi and this campaign may have just been a gesture of goodwill.

To the east, the power of the Sena dynasty was growing under Lakshmana Sena and this likely led to a loss of territory of the Karnatas and this has been speculated to have included parts of modern-day Purnea district. In Nepal, the situation was no better as the Malla dynasty under Arimalla likely broke off from Karnatas suzerainty.

=== Downfall ===
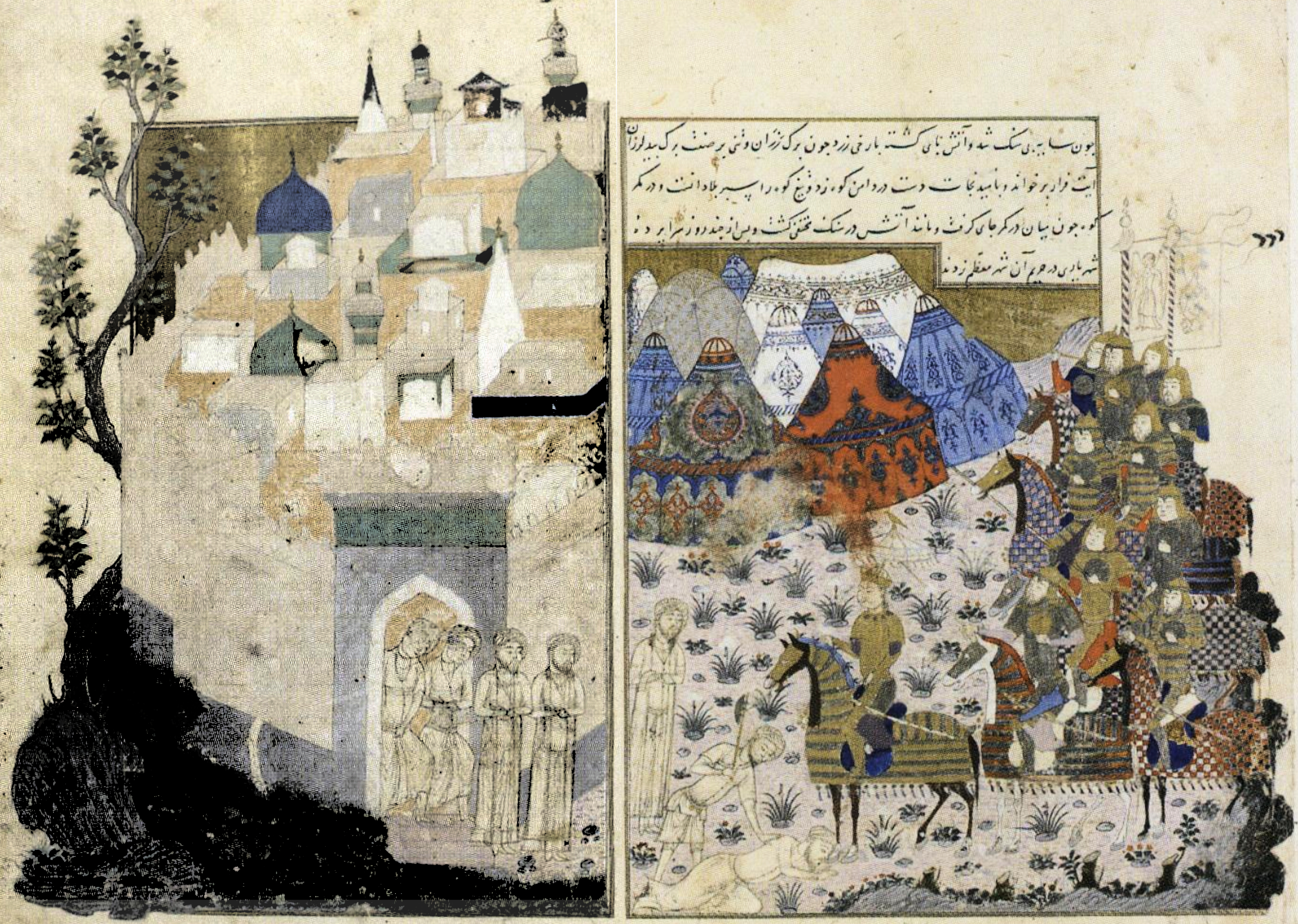
Drawing depicting Ghiyath al-Din Tughluq capturing Simraungadh from Harisimhadeva in 1324 CE

Harisimhadeva (r. 1295 to 1324 CE), the sixth descendant of Nanyadeva was the last Karnat sovereign of Tirhut. During the later years of his reign, the Tughlaq dynasty came to power and ruled the Delhi Sultanate and most of Northern India from 1320 to 1413 CE. In 1324 CE, the founder of the Tughlaq dynasty and Sultan of Delhi, Ghiyasuddin Tughlaq, turned his attention towards Bengal. The Tughlaq army invaded Bengal. On his way back to Delhi, the Sultan heard about Simraungarh, which was flourishing inside the jungle. Harisimhadeva turned out to be the last king of the Karnata dynasty as he didn't show his strength and left the fort when he heard the news of an army of the Tughlaq Sultan approaching Simraungarh. The Sultan and his troop stayed there for 3 days and cleared the dense forest. Finally on day 3, the army attacked and entered the huge fort whose walls were tall and surrounded by 7 big ditches.

The remains are still scattered all over the Simraungadh region. The king Harisimhadeva fled northwards into what is now Nepal. The son of Harisimhadeva, Jagatsinghadeva, married the widowed princess of Bhaktapur, Nayak Devi.

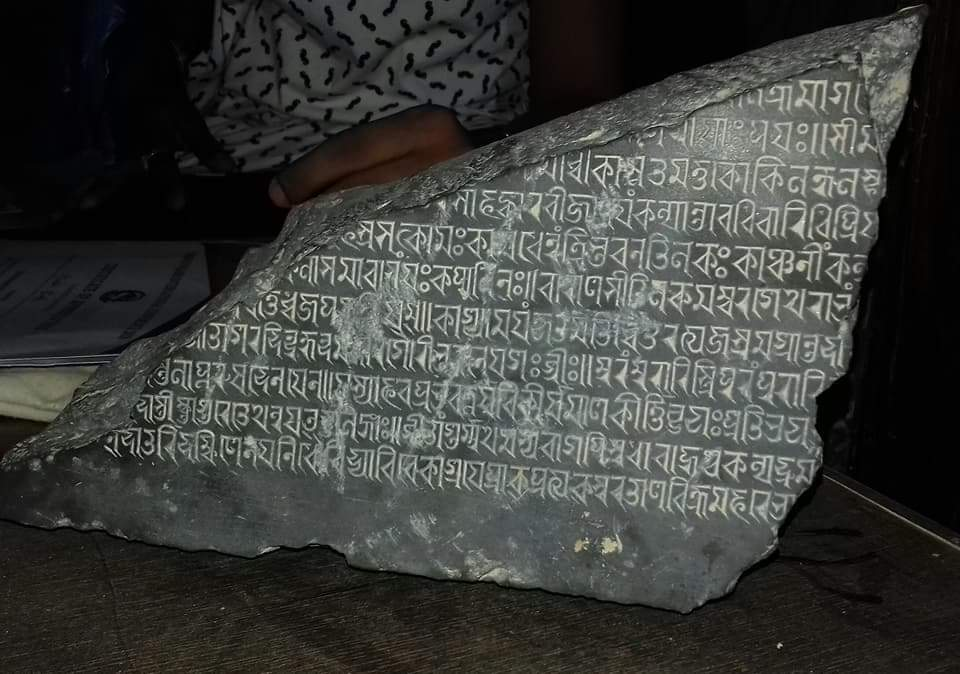
12th century Stone Inscription in the Tirhuta script made during the reign of Narsimhadeva

== Architecture ==
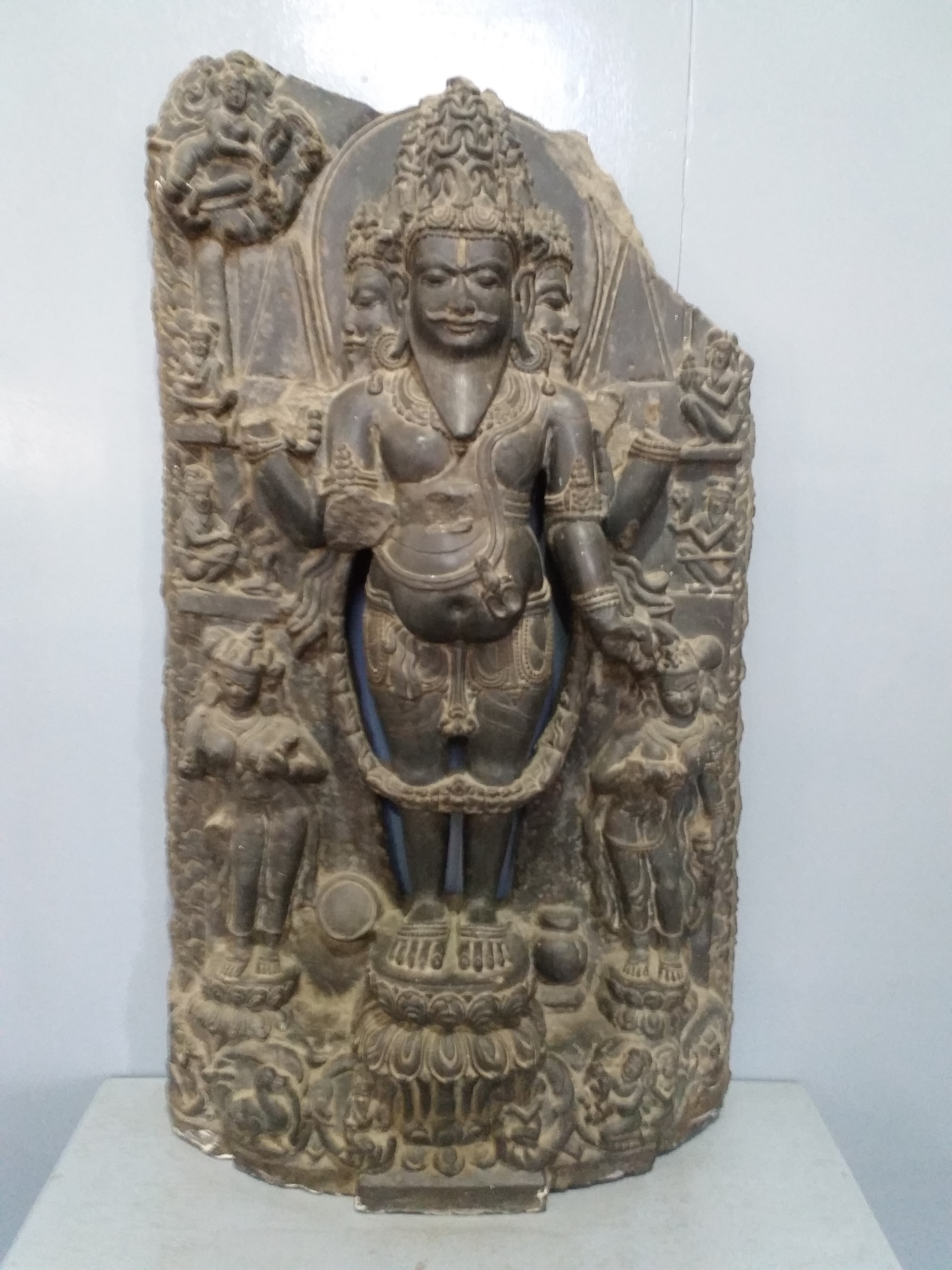
Statue of Brahma recovered from Simraungadh

Inscriptions and artefacts related to the Karnat dynasty have been found throughout the Mithila region including in both Simraungadh and Darbhanga. From Simraungadh, steles have been recovered that resemble Pala-Sena art. This was likely due to the close contact the kingdoms had with each other due to being neighbours, which allowed for cultural exchange. Many of these steles depict various Hindu goddesses known as bhagwati locally and are typical of Mithila's artistic output in the second half of the 12th century, especially in relation to the ornaments.

== Society ==
Under the Karnatas, Mithila operated as a feudal state. The landowning class mostly the Maithil Brahmin held much of the power and the Kings held absolute authority. The writings of poet, Sridhara contain poems detailing the depressed conditions of the peasantry who were subject to coercion from the landlord class. Agriculture was the main profession practiced during this period as confirmed by the writings of Jyotirishwar Thakur. Crafts and trade guilds were also present.

The culture of Mithila was also orthodox and conservative and this conservatism was reinforced by the institution of Kulinism which as per local tradition, was introduced by the final Karnat King, Harisimhadeva. This system provided an elite position to those belonging to certain communities and is also linked with the introduction of the Panji Prabandh system which tracked the genealogy of certain castes and this system still survives today. The introduction of Panjis can be traced even further back and goes back to the reign of Nanyadeva.

== Religion ==
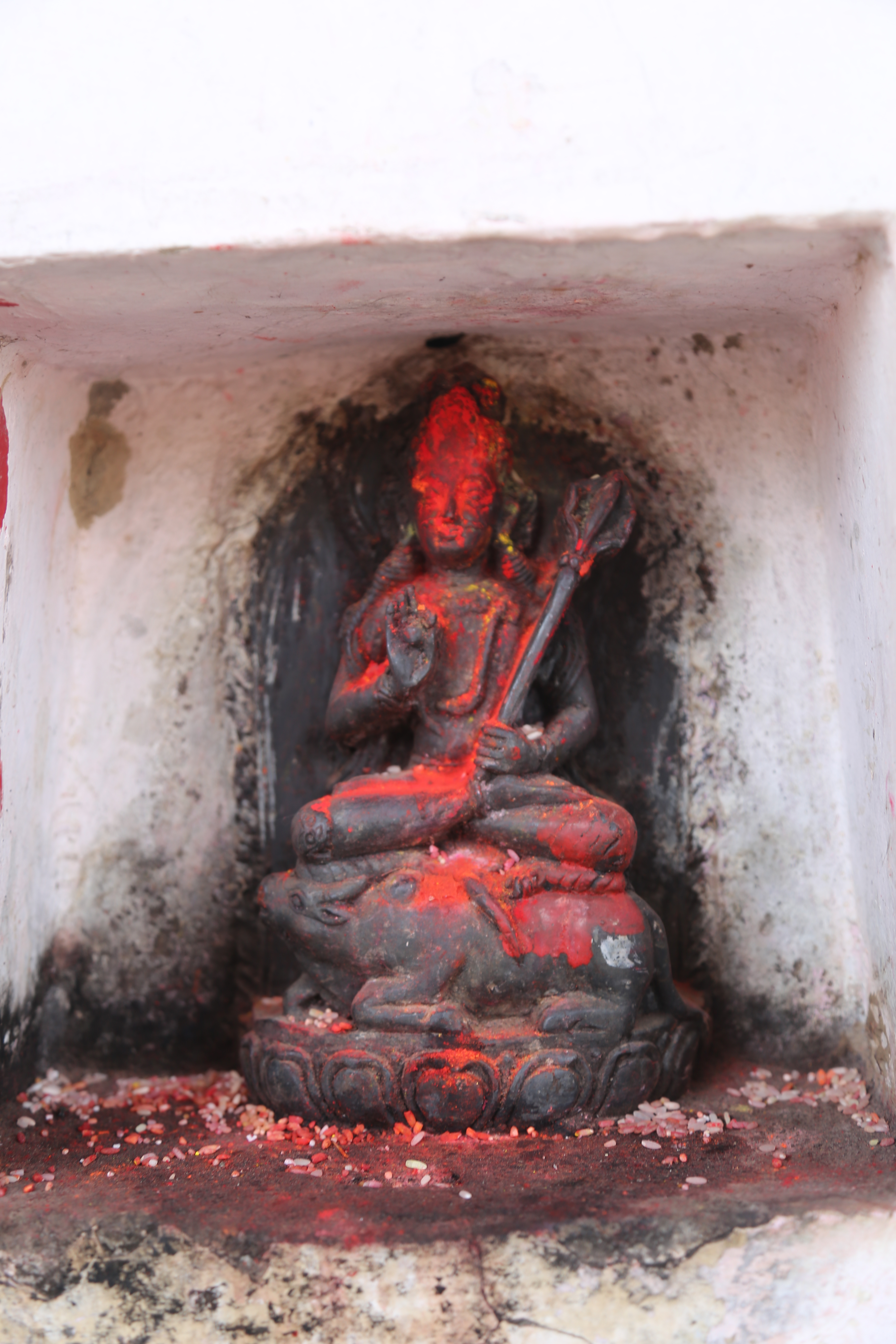
A statue of the Hindu deity, Shiva at the ruins of the Karnat capital of Simraungadh

As they belonged to warrior-class immigrants from the region of Karnataka, the Karnats generally supported and patronised Hinduism. This is made clear from the inscriptions and images associated with the dynasty that have been reported so far. An inscribed of Vishnu has been recovered from the village of Andhra Tharhi in Madhubani district and records that it was donated by a Karnat minister by the name of Śrīdharaṇadāsa during the rule of Nanyadeva.

Another inscription was located in the village of Bhithbhagwanpur, this time of Lakshmi Narayana and containing the writing, Om Sri Malladevasya which was left by the Karnat prince, Malladeva who kept his stronghold in the village. Brahmanical sculptures have continued to be found throughout Mithila during the Karnat period.

Buddhism was also present during the Karnat period of Mithila with Tibetan Buddhist monk and traveller, Dharmasvamin, being offered the role of chief priest by Ramasimhadeva and being gifted with gold, rice and medicine despite the latter being a Hindu. Dharmasvamin politely declined the offer. The Naulagarh inscription also records the building of Buddhist monasteries within the Karnata territory.

== Legacy ==
Under the Karnatas, Mithila experienced a period of relative peace which allowed authors, poets and artists to receive royal patronage. The Maithili language grew strongly during this period as new literature and folk songs were created. The philosopher, Gangeśa Upādhyāya, introduced the Navya-Nyāya school of thought which remained active in India until the 18th century. The general religious attitude of the people was conservative and the priestly & Intellectual leadership aristocracy of Maithil Brahmins dominated the society and the royal court. The Varna Ratnakara of Jyotirishwar Thakur was also composed during the reign of Harisimhadeva.

=== Later Karnats ===
After Harisimhadeva fled Mithila, evidence exists of Karnat Kings still ruling some parts of the region up to the 15th century during the same time when the Oiniwar dynasty controlled central Mithila. In Champaran, the ruler was Prithvisimhadeva and his successors including Madansimhadeva. Their territory extended up to Gorakhpur district. Prithvisimhadeva was considered to be a descendant of Harisimhadeva. Other remnants of the Karnat dynasty were also found in Saharsa and Madhepura districts, where inscriptions have been found that refer to a ruler called Sarvasimhadeva.

=== Descendants ===
It is said that after his defeat, Harisimhadeva fled to Kathmandu where his descendants became the founders of the Malla dynasty of Kathmandu. The Mallas were noted to be great patrons of the Maithili language.

It is also said that another branch of the Karnats remained in Mithila. Their descendants became the Gandhavariya Rajputs of North Bihar who held many chiefdoms in the region.

== Rulers ==
There is debate as to who succeeded Nanyadeva as ruler of the Karnat dynasty of Mithila as he had two sons, Gangadeva and Malladeva. Most scholars agree that Gangadeva was the ruler. However, it is generally accepted that Malladeva formed his stronghold in the village of Bheet-Bhagwanpur. The rulers of the Karnat dynasty are as follows:

S.N.	Name of the rulers	Timeline	Notes
1	Nanyadeva	1097 - 1147 CE	
2	Gangadeva	1147 - 1187 CE	
3	Narsimhadeva	1187 - 1227 CE	
4	Ramasimhadeva	1227 - 1285 CE	
5	Shaktisimhadeva	1285 - 1304 CE	
6	Harisimhadeva	1304 - 1324 CE	

== See also ==
- Simraungadh

== Sources ==
- Schwartzberg, Joseph E. (1978). A Historical atlas of South Asia. Chicago: University of Chicago Press. ISBN 0226742210. Archived from the original on 2021-02-24.
