= Nanpur =

Historical village in Mithila, Bihar, India

Coordinates: 26°26′23″N 85°39′54″E

Nanpur नानपुर Nanyapur
- Block cum Village
- Nanpur
- Interactive map of Nanpur
- Country: India
- State: Bihar
- Region: Mithila region
- District: Sitamarhi district
- Named for: King Nanyadeva
- Demonym: Maithil

Language
  - Official: Hindi

Language
  - Mother language: Maithili
- First capital of the Karnat Dynasty in Mithila of the Tirhut Sarkar.

Nanpur (Maithili: नानपुर) is a historical village in the Sitamarhi district of the Mithila region in Bihar, India. It is situated near Pupri town of the Sitamarhi district. It was the first capital of the Karnat Dynasty in Mithila.

Recently, the Government of Bihar has decided to promote industrial activities in the district, in which some locations of the Nanpur block have been identified. On the identified lands, a well-organized and modern industrial area is going to be established by the government's financial assistance.

== History ==
According to history of Mithila, Nanyadeva was the first king in the Karnat Dynasty of Mithila. Before 1097, he settled at Nanpur village after conquering the Mithila region. According to historians, before Nanyadeva, there was a king named Alark in Nanpur. It is said that the buried wealth of the king Alark was given to Nanyadeva. He then built a fort at Nanpur. He carved a golden snake and Sanskrit verse on it in the foundation of his fort in Nanpur. The place where the wealth was found, there still snake is worshiped. During the period of Karnat Dynasty in Mithila, the village was called as Nanyapur after the name of the king Nanyadeva. In the present time, the village is known as Nanpur.

Later, the capital of the Karnat Dynasty shifted to Simraungadh but the son Gangadeva of the king Nanyadeva remained in Nanpur. Gangadeva later established a village known as Gangwara near the Nanpur village.
