= Alark =

Ancient king in Nanpur pargana of Mithila

Alarka
- Raja
- Successor: Bali
Era name and dates
- Ancient: Unknown
Regnal name
- Raja Alarka
- House: Mithila
- Religion: Hinduism
- Capital - Nanpur

Alark (Maithili: अलर्क) was a king in some ancient period of the Mithila region in the Indian subcontinent. His capital was in the Nanpur pargana of the Mithila region. After him, a king of name Bali ruled the region. Alarka was a very generous king and was known for donations in the region. He was a wealthy ruler. According to a Sanskrit Shloka mentioned in historical documents, his buried treasure was found by the later mediaeval King Nanyadeva.

रामो वेत्ति नलो वेत्ति वेत्ति राजा पुरूरवाः । अलर्कस्य धनं प्राप्य नान्यो राजा भविष्यति ।।

== Description ==
Pargeter alludes to the story of 28 Narpatis (kings) ruling Mithila, but their time, place, and names are unknown or unclear in history and Puranas. In ancient times, there ruled a very generous king named Alarka in the Mithila region. According to a legend, it is said that he had given away his eyes to a blind Brahmin on his request. This legend depicts his level of generosity. The story of donating eyes by the King Alarka to the blind Brahmin was also referenced by the queen Kaikeyi to the King Dasharatha of Ayodhya in the epic Ramayana. It is mentioned in the Shloka 43 of Sarga (chapter ) 12 in the Ayodhyā Kāṇḍa of the Ramayana.

शैब्यः श्येनकपोतीये स्वमांसं पक्षिते ददौ । अलर्कश्चक्षुषी दत्वा जगाम गतिमुत्तमाम् ।।

— Valmiki, Śloka 4, Sarga 12, Ayodhyā Kāṇḍa, Ramayana

According to the book Mithila ka Itihaas, Nanyadeva came to the village of Koili (near Pupri) in the Nanpur Pargana. He set up camp there with his army. One day, in front of his camp, he saw a snake with something written on its hood. Nanyadeva himself was unable to read the words inscribed on the hood. After that to know the mysterious words inscribed on the snake's hood, he called a pandit to read it. A pandit was brought there to read the mysterious words inscribed on the hood. The pandit red the verse inscribed on the snake's hood and explained the meaning of that verse to Nanyadeva. According to the verse, Nanyadeva would receive the immense wealth of Alarka safely there, and through it he would become the king of Mithila, witnessed by Rama, Nala and Pururava.

== Alark's wealth treasure ==
The vast wealth treasure of the legendary King Alarka was buried under the earth. After listening the explanation of the verse by the pandit, inscribed on the snake's hood, Nanyadeva dug the earth there. He recovered the vast hidden wealth treasure preserved by Alarka beneath the earth. After that a golden serpent with a Sanskrit shloka engraved on its hood was buried in the foundation of the fort. Even today, the snake is worshipped at the place where the wealth of the King Alarka was found.
