= Pithipatis of Magadha =

Late medieval Buddhist dynasty in Magadha

Pīṭhīpatis of Magadha
- c. 1120–c. 1290
- Approximate location of the Pithipatis, with contemporary polities circa 1175.
- Capital: Bodh Gaya
- Common languages: Sanskrit
- Religion: Buddhism
- Historical era: Medieval India
  - Established: c. 1120
  - Disestablished: c. 1290
Preceded by	Succeeded by
Pala Empire	Delhi Sultanate

The Pithipatis of Magadha (also known as the Pithis) were the rulers of Magadha from the 11th to 13th century CE in what is now Bihar, India. They were centred in Bodh Gaya and Pithi refers to the diamond throne where the Buddha was said to have gained enlightenment.

The Pithipati chiefs styled themselves with the title of Acarya in addition to Pīṭhīpati. Pithipati Buddhasena also termed himself as magadhādipati (ruler or lord of Magadha). The realm of the Pithipatis at its peak seems to have extended from the Magadha region up to the western and southern parts of Munger district as inscriptions of the Pithipatis have been found in these regions.

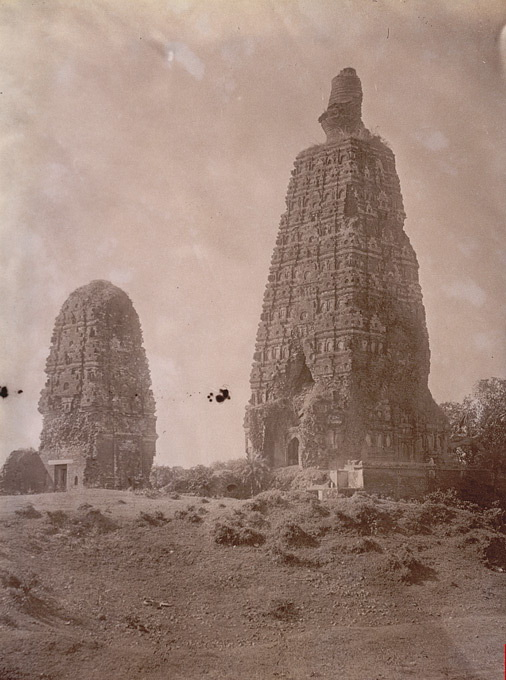
The Mahabodhi Temple prior to its restoration. The Pithipatis maintained authority over the temple for a period

== Origin ==
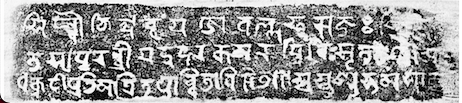
Inscription of Pithipati Jayasena inside the Mahabodhi Temple sanctum, 13th-century CE

The historian, Dineshchandra Sircar, noted that the Pithipatis appear to have originally been religious authorities and priests before eventually coming into power themselves at some point in the 11th century during the Pala rule of the region and the Pithis themselves were likely subordinates of the Pala dynasty.

Pithipati inscriptions refer to the dynasty/clan name as Chinda and Chikkora. Kumaradevī, the daughter of Devaraksita, calls her father a Chikkora, while a later descendant, Jayasena, calls his ancestors Chinda indicating the use of different family names. The Chindas/Chikkoras were descended from the Chindaka Nagas who ruled the Bastar region of what is now the modern-day state of Chhattisgarh. They were noblemen of the area who served as advisors to the Kalachuris of Ratnapura. Vallabharaja, the first Pithipati, arrived in Bodh Gaya and converted to Buddhism, whereupon he adopted the monastic name of Devaraksita.

== History ==
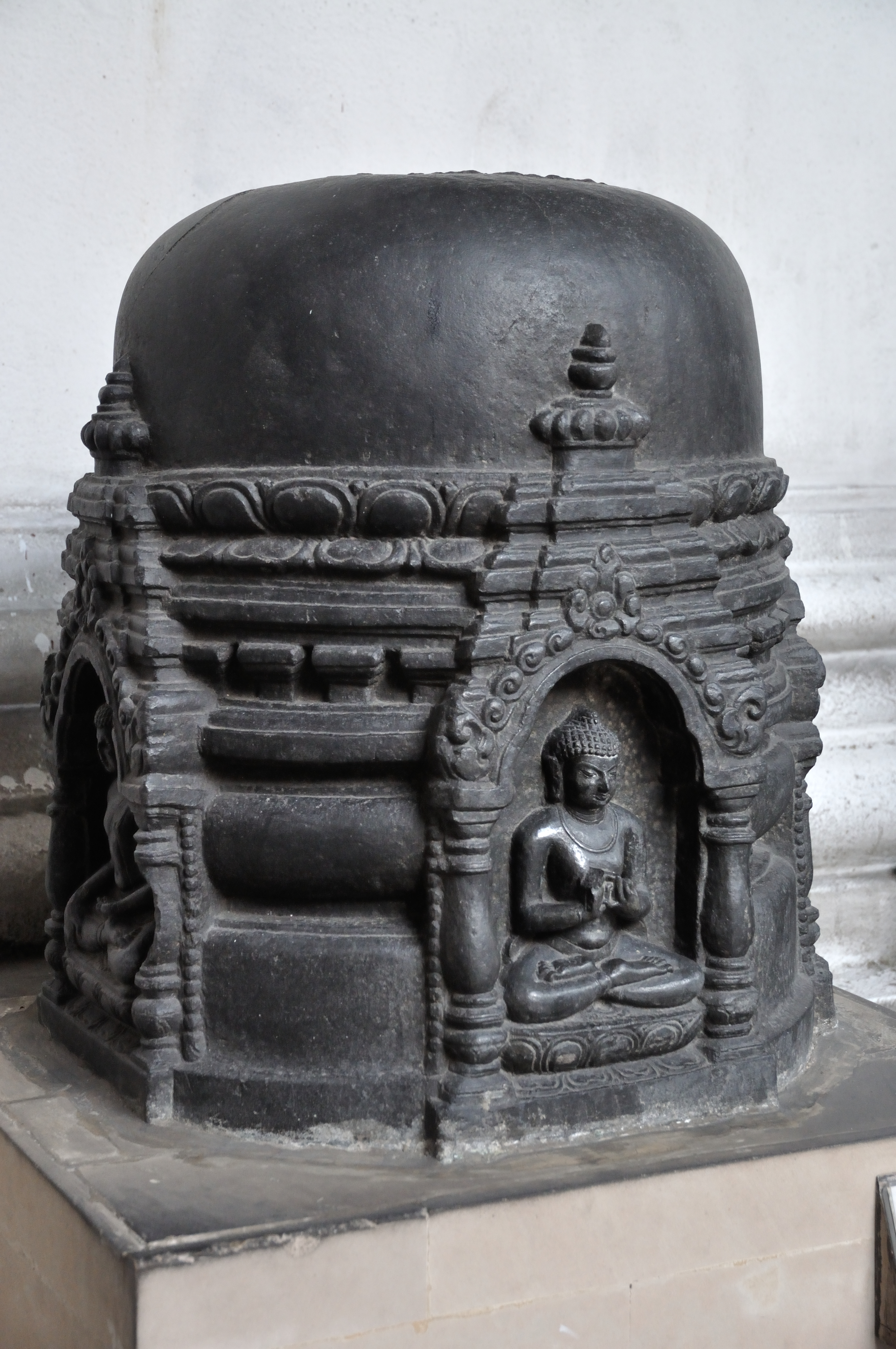
Votive Stupa from 11th century Bodh Gaya

The first king of this dynasty was Vallabharāja whose rule of Bodh Gaya is confirmed by the Sarnath inscription of his daughter, Kumaradevi in the 12th century. Kumaradevi was one of the wives of Govindachandra of the Gahadavala dynasty. Vallabharāja likely arrived in Bodh Gaya from the area of Ratanpur and began a campaign against Ramapala. During this conflict, he established Bodh Gaya as his base of operations and conquered it from the previous ruling family known as the Yakspāla. It has been speculated that he was aided in his campaign by Govindachandra and that Kumaradevi's marriage to Govindacharandra was part of the terms of this alliance. After gaining control of Bodh Gaya he converted to Buddhism and took on the new name, Devaraksita. At this point, he made peace with the Palas by marrying the daughter of Mahana Pala (uncle of Ramapala).

The Pithipatis were contemporaries and neighbours of the Gahadavalas to the west, the Pala dynasty to the east and the Karnats of Mithila to the north. In one incident that has been recorded in the Puruṣaparīkṣā of the 15th-century poet, Vidyapati, the Karnat prince, Malladeva, in an attempt to prove his valour, led an expedition that ousted the ruler of the "Chikkora dynasty" from his throne in Bodh Gaya. At the time, the ruler would have been an aged Devaraksita. In response, the Gahadavala King, possibly Jayachandra, sent a force that defeated Malladeva and restored Devaraksita or his son Deśarāja to the throne of Bodh Gaya.

The Pithi chiefs were also noted for providing land to visiting Sri Lankan monks in Bodh Gaya so that they could build a monastery. Inscriptions from the period detail the granting of land to the Singhalasangha by Acarya Buddhasena. It also details how a nearby village called Kottahala was granted to a Sinhalese monk called Mangalavamsin for the maintenance of the Mahabodhi Temple.

=== Islamic invasion and decline ===
During the reign of Acarya Pithi Buddhasena, the region began to experience raids from Turkic invaders and the Pithipatis were forced to swear fealty to them. This is detailed in the memoirs of the Tibetan pilgrim, Dharmasvamin who visited Bodh Gaya in 1234–35. Dharmasvamin states that Buddhasena had retreated with his soldiers into a forest and they had left the Mahabodhi temple fortified for its protection with just four monks present at the site.

== Relations with neighbours ==
The sway of the Pithipatis at its peak seems to have extended from the Gaya and Magadha region up to the western and southern parts of Munger district as an inscription from a Pithipati ruler has been found in the village of Arma in Munger. The Ramacharitam notes that the Pithipatis paid a nominal nod to the Pala Empire but managed their own internal affairs. It is likely that once the Pala dynasty ended they switched their allegiance to other powers although they seem to have regained their power following the invasion of Bakhtiyar Khalji. Inscriptional evidence shows they may have helped in repairing the Odantapuri monastery situated 70 km from Bodh Gaya. A thirteenth-century stone inscription also confirms that the Pithipatis donated land to the Telhara monastery. The 13th century Tibetan pilgrim, Dharmasvamin, also writes about how the Pithipati kings patronised the monks of Nalanda including the abbot at the time, Rahula Shribhadra.

== Sarnath inscription of Kumaradevī ==
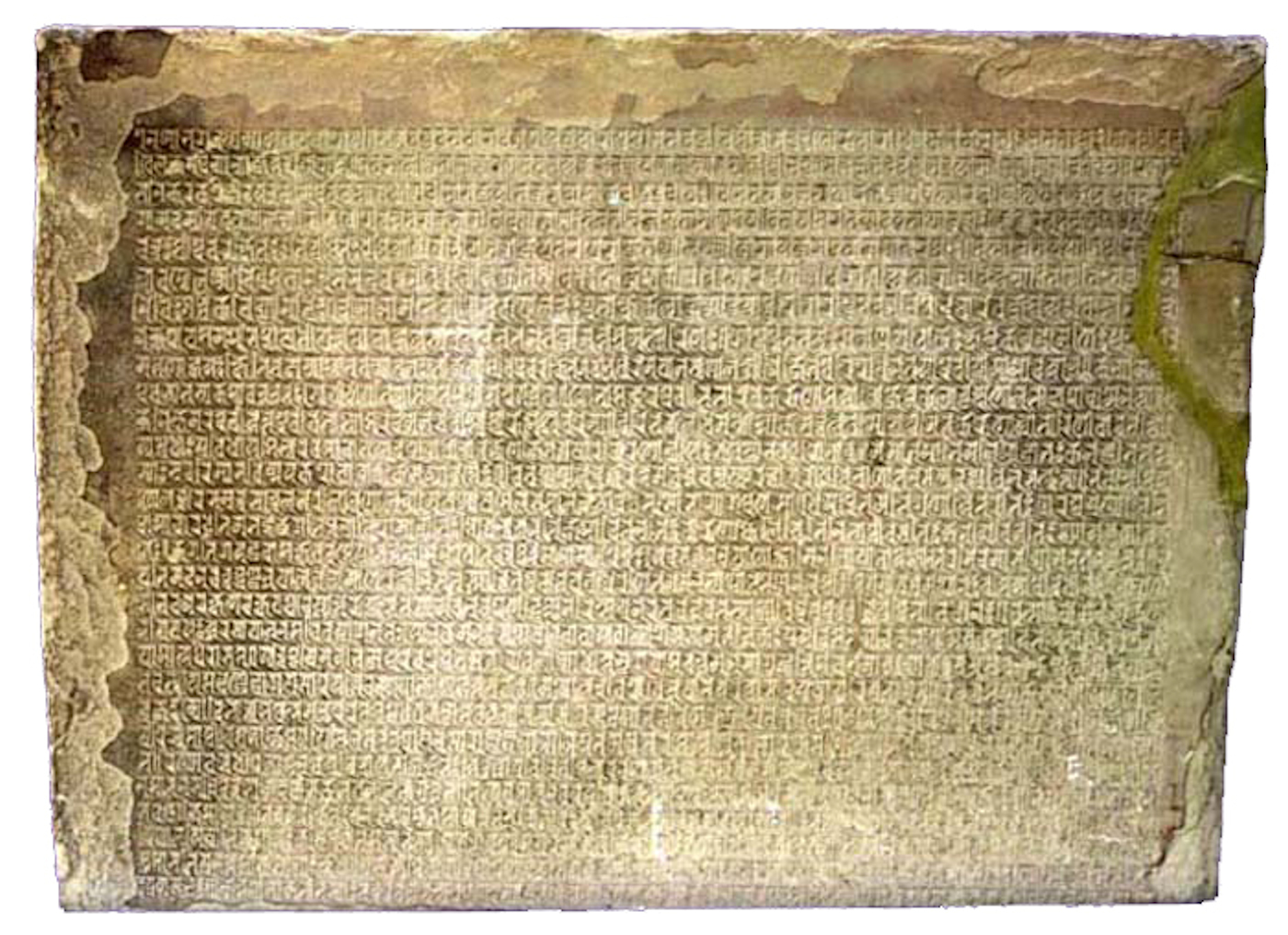
Inscription of Kumaradevi, daughter of Pithipati Devaraksita, which refers the construction of Dharmachakra-Jina-Vihara at Sarnath, and the invasions of the "wicked" Turushkas. 12th century CE.

Kumaradevī, the wife of Gahadavala king, Govindachandra left an inscription in Sarnath indicating her Buddhist faith and that her father was Devaraksita who was a member of the Chikkora dynasty.

Balogh states that Kumaradevī, the daughter of Pithipati Devaraksita, was married to Govindachandra as part of an alliance between the two kingdoms which was formed to counter the Palas.

== List of rulers ==
Rough dates for the period of rule that each of the Pithipati kings reigned for:

- Vallabharāja (Name changed to Devaraksita after conversion) (1120–1160 CE)
- Deśarāja (1160–1180 CE)
- Devasthira (1180–1200 CE)
- Buddhasena (1200–1240 CE)
- Pūrnabhadra (1240–1255)
- Jayasena (1255–1280)

After Jayasena, other rulers followed, of which less is known, including Sangharaksita, Buddhasena II and Madhusena.
