= Varna Ratnakara =

Oldest literary work in the Maithili language

Varna Ratnakara वर्ण रत्नाकार
- Asiatic Society of Kolkata
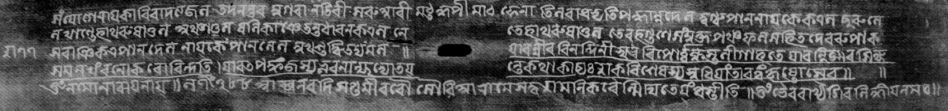
- Varṇa Ratnākara manuscript, Page 77 (b)
- Type: Encyclopedia
- Date: Early 14th-century
- Place of origin: Mithila
- Language: Maithili
- Author: Jyotirishwar Thakur
- Material: Palm leaf
- Size: 12.7 × 5 cm; 77 leaves; 17 missing
- Condition: preserved
- Script: Tirhuta
- Discovered: Pandit Hara Prasad Shastri (1885-90) in Nepal

The Varna Ratnakara, Maithili: वर्ण रत्नाकर, (IAST: Varṇa Ratnākara), literally "Ocean of description", is the oldest prose work of Maithili language, written in 1324 CE by the Maithil scholar, priest and poet Jyotirishwar Thakur. The author was a part of the court of King Harisimhadeva (r. 1304–1324) of the Karnat dynasty whose capitals were in both Simraungadh and Darbhanga.

This work contains descriptions of various subjects and situations. This work provides valuable information about the life and culture of medieval India. The text is divided into seven Kallolas (waves): Nagara Varṇana, Nāyikā Varṇana, Asthāna Varṇana, Ṛtu Varṇana, Prayāṇa Varṇana, Bhaṭṭādi Varṇana and Śmaśāna Varṇana. An incomplete list of 84 Siddhas is found in the text, which consists only 76 names. A manuscript of this text is preserved in the Asiatic Society, Kolkata

The word Abahattha was used for the very first time in this encyclopedic work. Later the Maithili poet Vidyapati wrote his poem Kīrttilatā in Abahatta.

== Author ==
Varṇa Ratnākara was written by Jyotirīśvara Ṭhākura, also spelled Jyotirishwar Thakur. Thakur was born in a Brahmin family. He was son of Rāmeśvara and grandson of Dhīreśvara. He was the court poet of King Harisimhadeva of Karnata dynasty of Mithila.
