= Malladeva =

Prince of Mithila

Era name and dates
- Mediaeval period: 12th century
- House: Mithila Kingdom
- Dynasty: Karnat Dynasty
- Father: Nanyadeva
- Religion: Hinduism
- Occupation: Valiant warrior, Prince of Tirhut Sarkar
- Capital - Bheet-Bhagwanpur

Malladeva was the son of King Nanyadeva from the Karnat dynasty, and a prince of Tirhut Sarkar in Mithila. According to some scholars, Malladeva has been referred to as the "forgotten King of Mithila" as most records and traditions mention that his brother Gangadeva succeeded his father as ruler of the dynasty. Nevertheless, Malladeva seems to have founded his own stronghold in the village of Bheet-Bhagwanpur in Darbhanga in modern-day Bihar, India. An inscription found in the village reads: "Om Shree Malladevasya" and many Karnat-era sculptures have been found in the area.

Malladeva has also been mentioned in the work of the poet Vidyapati, who described him as a "valiant warrior" who served in the army of King Jayachandra of Kannauj but left as his quarrelsome nature led to major disagreements and he was forced to return to Mithila. He is also mentioned in the Sanskrit text Purushapariksha composed by the Maithil poet Vidyapati. Local tradition asserts that he was not on good terms with his brother Gangadeva. Folk tradition also asserts that the villages of Maldiha in Purnea district and Malhad in Supaul district were founded by Malladeva. The village of Bheet-Bhagwanpur is today home to a prominent family of Gandhavariya Rajputs who are considered by some to be descended from Malladeva.
