= Ramasimhadeva =

King of Mithila from 1227 to 1285

King of Mithila
- Reign: 1227–1285
- Predecessor: Narsimhadeva
- Successor: Saktisimhadeva
- Born: 8 March 1188
- Died: 1285 (aged 96–97)
- House: Karnata dynasty

Ramasimhadeva (8 March 1188 – 1285) was the fourth King of the Karnat dynasty of Mithila. He came into power around 1227 and succeeded his father, Narasimhadeva.

== Reign ==
Ramasimhadeva has been described as a "pious devotee and was a firm patron of sacred literature" and his reign was generally quite peaceful, in contrast to his father's. He compiled several commentaries on the Vedas. He also created various rules that were meant to guide Hindus and officers were sent to each village to ensure these were followed. Several other administrative reforms have also been attributed to him including the use of village accountants.

During his reign, the Tibetan monk Dharmasvamin arrived in the main Karnat capital of Simraungadh and described Ramasimhadeva as treating him with courtesy and even offering him the post of palace priest despite being a Buddhist. Ramasimhadeva also maintained Darbhanga as his second capital and today, many places are found in Darbhanga that reference his name.
