= Narsimhadeva =

King of Mithila from 1174 to 1227

Narasimhadeva

King of Mithila
- Reign: 1174–1227
- Predecessor: Gangadeva
- Successor: Ramasimhadeva
- House: Karnata dynasty

Narasimhadeva was the third king of the Karnat dynasty of Mithila from 1174 until his death in 1227. Most scholars agree that he came into power around 1174 and succeeded his predecessor, Gangadeva.

== Reign ==
The Maithili poet, Vidyapati, referred to Narasimhadeva as "Satyavira" to allude to how turbulent his reign was. He was engaged in a conflict with the King of Nepal who was his kinsmen. He also showed defiance against Tughral Tughan Khan of the Mamluk Sultanate of Delhi. Khan responded by carrying out raids in Mithila and capturing Narasimhadeva who was later released in Darbhanga. He also engaged in a conflict with Iwaz Khalji who was the Governor of Bengal who undertook an expedition to Mithila and succeeded in compelling the Karnatas to pay tribute.

Due to this, it has been said that Mithila first felt the presence of Muslim invasions during Narasimhadeva 's reign.
