= Bhit Bhagwanpur =

Historical village in Mithila

Bhit Bhagwanpur Bheet-Bhagwanpur
- Village
- Bhīṭha Bhagavānpur
- Interactive map of Bhit Bhagwanpur
- Country: India
- State: Bihar
- Region: Mithila
- District: Madhubani
- Block: Madhepur
- Founder: Malladeva

Population (2011)
  - Total: 12,647
- Demonym: Maithils

Languages
  - Official: Mother tongue: Hindi; Maithili

Bhit Bhagwanpur (Romanised: Bhīṭha Bhagavānpur) also written as Bheet-Bhagwanpur is a historical village in the Mithila region of Bihar in India. It is located in the Madhepur block of the Madhubani district. Bhit Bhagwanpur is also an archaeological site. There are ruins of the fort, which is related to the King Malladeva in Mithila. The village is also popular for the ancient Veereshwar Shiva Mandir. The village lies about 9 kilometres south from the block headquarter of Madhepur.

== History ==
In the village, an inscription incised on the pedestal of an image of Laxmi Narayan was found, which gives the name of Malladeva, the son of the King Nanyadeva.
