= Jyotirishwar Thakur =

Jyotirishwar Thakur or Kaviśekharācārya Jyotirīśvara Ṭhākura (1260–1340) was a Maithili poet, playwright, musician and an early Maithili and Sanskrit writer, known for the Varṇa Ratnākara, his encyclopedic work in Maithili.

== Life ==
Jyotirishwar was son of Rāmeśvara and grandson of Dhīreśvara. He was the court poet of King Harisimhadeva of the Karnat dynasty of Mithila (r. 1300–1324).

== Major works ==
His most significant work in Maithili, the Varṇa Ratnākara (1324) is an encyclopedic work in prose. This work contains descriptions of various subjects and situations. This work provides valuable information about the life and culture of medieval India. The text is divided into seven Kallolas (waves): Nagara Varṇana, Nāyikā Varṇana, Asthāna Varṇana, Ṛtu Varṇana, Prayāṇa Varṇana, Bhaṭṭādi Varṇana and Śmaśāna Varṇana. An incomplete list of 84 Siddhas is found in the text, which consists only 76 names. A manuscript of this text is preserved in the Asiatic Society, Kolkata (ms. no 4834 of Asiatic Society of Bengal).

His major Sanskrit play, the Dhūrta Samāgama (The Meeting of the Knaves) (1320) is a two act Prahasana (comedy). The play relates the contest between a religious mendicant Viśvanagara and his disciple Durācāra over a lovely courtesan Anaṅgasenā whom the Brahmin arbitrator Asajjātimiśra keeps for himself. Superior characters in this drama speak in Sanskrit, inferior characters speak in Prakrit and the songs are in Maithili.

His another Sanskrit work, the Pañcasāyaka (Five Arrows) in five parts deals with the same topics which are dealt in the other standard works on the Kāmaśāstra.
