= Gangadeva =

King of Mithila from 1147 to 1187

King of Mithila
- Reign: 1147–1187
- Predecessor: Nanyadeva
- Successor: Narsimhadeva
- Kingdom: Tirhut Sarkar
- Kingdom: Karnat dynasty

Gangadeva (also known as Gangeyadeva) was the second ruler of the Karnat dynasty of Mithila. He succeeded his father Nanyadeva as king in 1147 and ruled until 1187.

== Rule ==
There is controversy surrounding the succession of the throne of Mithila following Nanyadeva's death as he was recorded as having two sons, Malladeva and Gangadeva however most inscriptions and manuscripts detail Gangadeva's rule only. The Pratap Malla inscription of Kathmandu details that Gangadeva came to the throne in 1147 and was considered to be a very brave King. He was a contemporary of King Madanpala of the Pala's of neighbouring Bengal and led attacks against them regaining some of the territories that had been lost during his father Nanyadeva's reign while also gaining new territory. The Ramacharitam also details that both Nanyadeva and Gangadeva claimed some sort of political authority in Gauda as he was declared as Gaudadwhaj. Following the downfall of the Palas, the Sena dynasty came into power in neighbouring Bengal and Ballala Sena was also a contemporary of Gangadeva but led no attacks on Mithila.

== Administration ==
Gangadeva was notable for his administrative reforms and added Darbhanga as an additional capital of the Karnat dynasty along with Simraungadh. The village of Gangapur Rajni in Madhepura district of Bihar was named after Gangadeva. During his reign, the post of Chaudhary came into existence in the Mithila region. He instituted the post of Chaudhary for the revenue collection in the territory of his kingdom.
