= Naulagarh =

Archaeological site in Bihar, India

- Nawlagarh
- Interactive map of Naulagarh
- 25°33′15″N 86°04′00″E
- Type: Mound
- Cultures: Northern Black Polished Ware, Medieval India
- Region: Begusarai district, Bihar, India

Site notes
- Excavation dates: 1950-52
- Discovered: 1950
- Condition: Partially preserved; mound intersected by road; site under threat from agricultural activities and erosion

Naulagarh is an archaeological site in the Begusarai district of Bihar, India. It is known for its multicultural background and cultural continuity. A number of coins ranging from punch marked coins to coins of the Muslim era have been reported to have been discovered by local people during agricultural practices. It is particularly notable for a black stone sculpture bearing the inscription of Vigrahapala III.

== Description ==
The Naulagarh mound is situated approximately 20 kilometres north-northeast of Begusarai city, near Birpur block headquarters. The mound extends over an area of about 1.5 kilometres in length, from Bhit in the east to Fansiari Tola in Makhwa panchayat in the west. It is located between the Balan River (east) and the Bainti River (south), which join approximately 1 kilometre east of the mound's centre. The mound is intersected by a road that divides it into two parts. The northern section is notable for its landscape, which includes both natural and man-made water channels. It has been suggested that the site is the location of Apar Nigam mentioned in Buddhist literature.

The mound seems to be divided into threе parts:

1. The central fortification area covered by a 3 metre wide fortification wall made of baked bricks.
2. Sodhni mound measuring 400m x 100m to the north of the fort.
3. The mound of Dih and Bhit to the east of the fortified area.

The antiquities discovered from the site, such as Mauryan-Shunga terracotta, Gupta seal sculptures, silver coins, etc. of the Pala period found in exploration, are kept in the Archaeological Museum of G.D. College, Begusarai.

=== Naulagarh inscriptions ===
The most significant finding from the site is a collection of inscriptions collectively known as the Naulagarh inscriptions. These include:

1. Three terracotta votive tablets inscribed with the Buddhist creed in Early Nāgarī script, dated to approximately the 9th century CE.
2. A stone image inscription from the 11th century CE mentioning the 24th regnal year of the Pala king Vigrahapala III.

This inscription is historically important as it confirms that Naulagarh was part of Krimilā Viṣaya (an ancient administrative division) during the Pala period. The inscription was published by Professor R.K. Choudhary in the G.D. College Bulletin (No. 2) in 1952.

== Excavations ==
Naulagarh is one of the earliest explored sites of the district. The Department of History and Archaeology, G.D. College, Begusarai, under supervision of Prof. R.K. Choudhary, explored and surveyed this site in 1950–52. A local resident, Shri Ram Nath Singh, had gifted the antique collection from this site to the Museum of G.D. College, Begusarai; the black stone sculpture bearing the inscription of Vigraha Pala III is protected and displayed in the Museum.

== Development proposals ==
The Naulagarh mound is not a centrally protected monument under the jurisdiction of the Archaeological Survey of India (ASI). According to a response from the Ministry of Culture in August 2023, no proposal for further excavation by the ASI is currently under consideration.
