= Nanyadeva =

King of Mithila from 1097 to 1147

- Mithileśwara; Maha Samantādhipati; Raja Narāyaṇa
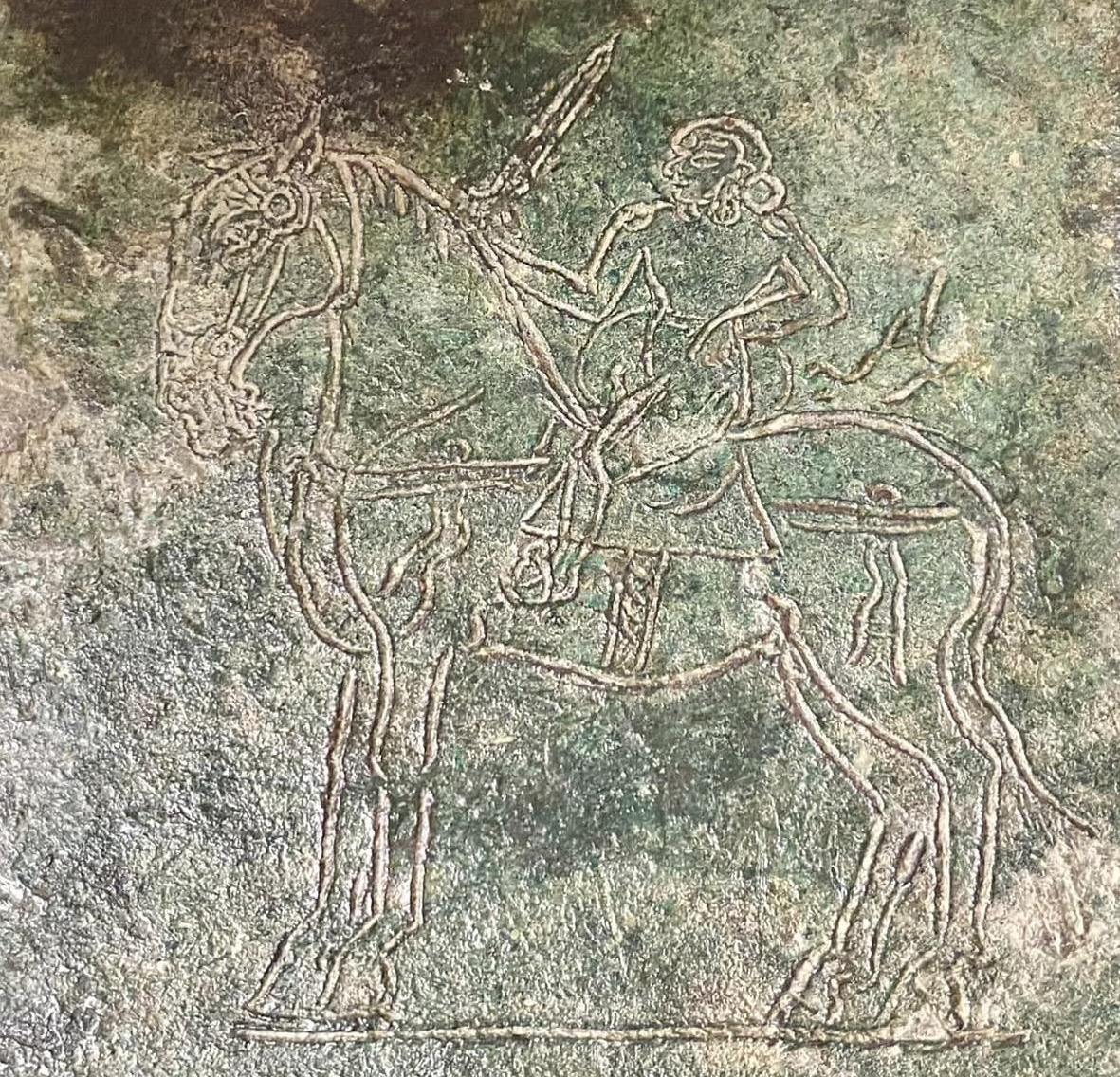
- Depiction of a horseman on a 12th century land grant inscription by Nanyadeva

King of Mithila
- Reign: 10 July 1097 – 1147
- Predecessor: Established
- Successor: Gangadeva
- House: Karnata dynasty

Nanyadeva (IAST: Nānyadev) was the founder of the Karnat dynasty of Mithila. He established his capital in Simraungadh and ruled the greater Mithila region for 50 years. He is known for his patronage of scholars. He began to rule Mithila from the citadel of Simraungadh, situated on the modern India-Nepal border, in 1097. Various inscriptions and land grants belonging to Nanyadeva have been found within the region to testify to his reign.

In his writings, Nanyadeva referred to himself as Mithileśwara which translates to ruler of Mithila.

== Etymology and names ==
Nanya is a word of Karnatic origin and Sanskritised form of Nanniya. Nanyadeva means "the dearest of god" (Nanya means "dearest" and deva means "god"). The Andhratharhi inscription of his minister, Shridhardas refers Nanyadeva as Mahasamantadhipati, Dharmamavaloka and Sriman Nanyapati.

== Early life ==
Little is known about Nanyadeva's early life although it is believed that Nanyadeva arrived in Mithila as part of the Chalukaya invasions of North India during the second half of the 11th century. The Chalukyas would likely have been accompanied by many military adventurers who carved out small principalities of their own in Northern India and Nanyadeva would have been among them in capturing land in the Mithila region of North Bihar. Inscriptions from the Sena dynasty of neighbouring Bengal refer to Nanyadeva as "Karnata-Kulabhusana" indicating an origin from the area around modern-day Karnataka in India. His original stronghold in Mithila was Nanapura in Champaran district of Bihar however he later shifted his capital to Simraungadh which would remain as the main capital until the end of the Karnat dynasty.

== Rule of Mithila ==
In Vidyapati's Purush Pariksa, Nanyadeva is confirmed to have gained control of Mithila by 1097 CE. Nanyadeva was a contemporary of Ramapala of the Pala Empire with whom he had fallen into conflict and then subsequently gained independence for Mithila. Following on from the Varendra rebellion, the Pala Empire was in a state of disintegration with the Sena dynasty establishing a power base in the Rarh region. Both the Karnatas and the Senas coveted the Pala territories of Gauda and Vanga and a conflict began between Mithila and the Senas with the Senas coming out victorious as per the Deopara inscription. Following on from this conflict, local tradition in Mithila confirms that parts of Mithila came under Sena hegemony however these were later regained by Nanyadeva's heir and son, Gangadeva in a later conflict.

To compensate for these losses, Nepalese traditions assert that Nanyadeva launched attacks into the Kathmandu Valley of Nepal which at the time was under the Thakuri dynasty. He may have extended his territory into parts of Nepal although the overall goal seems to have been to capture loot rather than land. The territories west of Nanyadeva's Kingdom were ruled by the Gahadavalas and Nanyadeva maintained peaceful relations with them and even sent his son, Prince Malladeva to serve in the army of the Gahadavalas.

== Legacy ==
Many modern scholars, as well as the people of the region, view Nanyadeva as a "son of Mithila" who liberated the region following the fall of the Videhan monarchy. The Karnata rule is not viewed as foreign as they established their power in Mithila itself, unlike others who ruled from outside. He was succeeded by his two sons, Gangadeva and Malladeva.

=== Literary works ===
He cultivated several melodies and recorded his knowledge in two Sanskrit musicological treatises called the Sarasvati Hridayalankara and the Bharatabhasya. These works are an in-depth assessment of different musical notes and how they can lead to certain feelings and sentiments ranging from heroism to anger. He completed these works following his ascendance to power in Mithila. Nanyadeva's knowledge of musicology was well-regarded and he is cited as an authority on the subject by the 13th-century Indian musicologist, Śārṅgadeva.

== Descendants ==
After the fall of the Karnat dynasty in 1324 and the power vacuum that followed, the Maithil Brahmins with the patronage and protection of the Tughlaqs came to power and formed the Oiniwar dynasty in the leadership of Kameshwar Thakur. The Karnats mainly split into two branches with Nanyadeva's descendant, Harisimhadeva fleeing to Nepal and marrying into the reigning Malla dynasty.

Evidence also exists of Karnat descendants still maintaining control in parts of Mithila. In Champaran, the ruler was Prithvisimhadeva and his successors including Madansimhadeva. Their territory extended up to Gorakhpur district. Prithvisimhadeva is considered to be a descendant of Harisimhadeva. Other remnants of the Karnat dynasty were also found in Saharsa and Madhepura districts, where inscriptions have been found that refer to a ruler called Sarvasimhadeva.

== Works ==
Two musicological-related treatises written in the Sanskrit language have been attributed to Nanyadeva:

- Sarasvati Hridayalankara
- Bharatabhasya
