= Dharmasvamin =

Tibetan monk and pilgrim

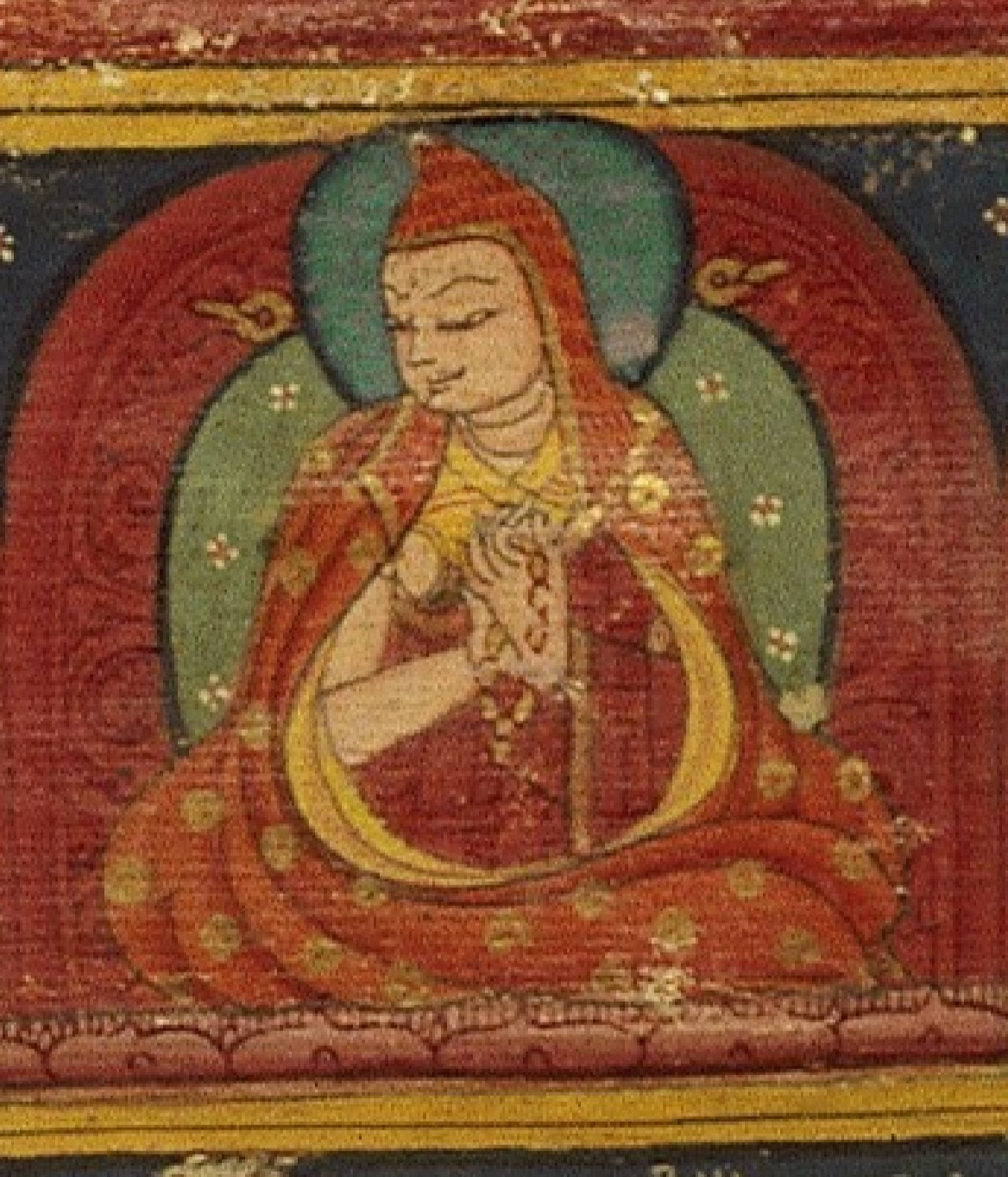
- Possible depiction of Dharmasvamin from a 14th century painting

Personal life
- Born: 1197 Chak village, Lhünzê County, Tibet
- Died: January 1264 (aged 66–67)
- Education: Swayambhunath temple; Nalanda mahavihara

Religious life
- Religion: Buddhism

Senior posting
- Teacher: Rahula Shribhadra

Dharmasvamin (Chag Lo-tsa-ba Chos-rje-dpal; 1197 – January 1264) was a Tibetan monk and pilgrim who travelled to Nepal and Magadha between 1234 and 1236. The main source on his life is his biography which was composed by Upasaka Chos-dar and provides an eyewitness account of the times. Dharmasvamin's accounts are important for reconstructing the continued operation of Nalanda after it was sacked in 1193 CE.

== Biography ==
Dharmasvamin was born in 1197 in Chak village in present-day Lhünzê County. He spent the first part of his life in his homeland, Tibet, where he studied the various scripts of the Indian subcontinent including Vaivarta (possibly proto-Bengali or proto-Maithili) and other topics that were a mainstay at the monasteries of Tibet including logic and grammar. He also had knowledge of how to draw mandalas. His biographer noted his studiousness and sharp memory among his many qualities. Dharmasvamin also knew of the many scholars that India had produced, including Chandrakirti and Chandragomin.

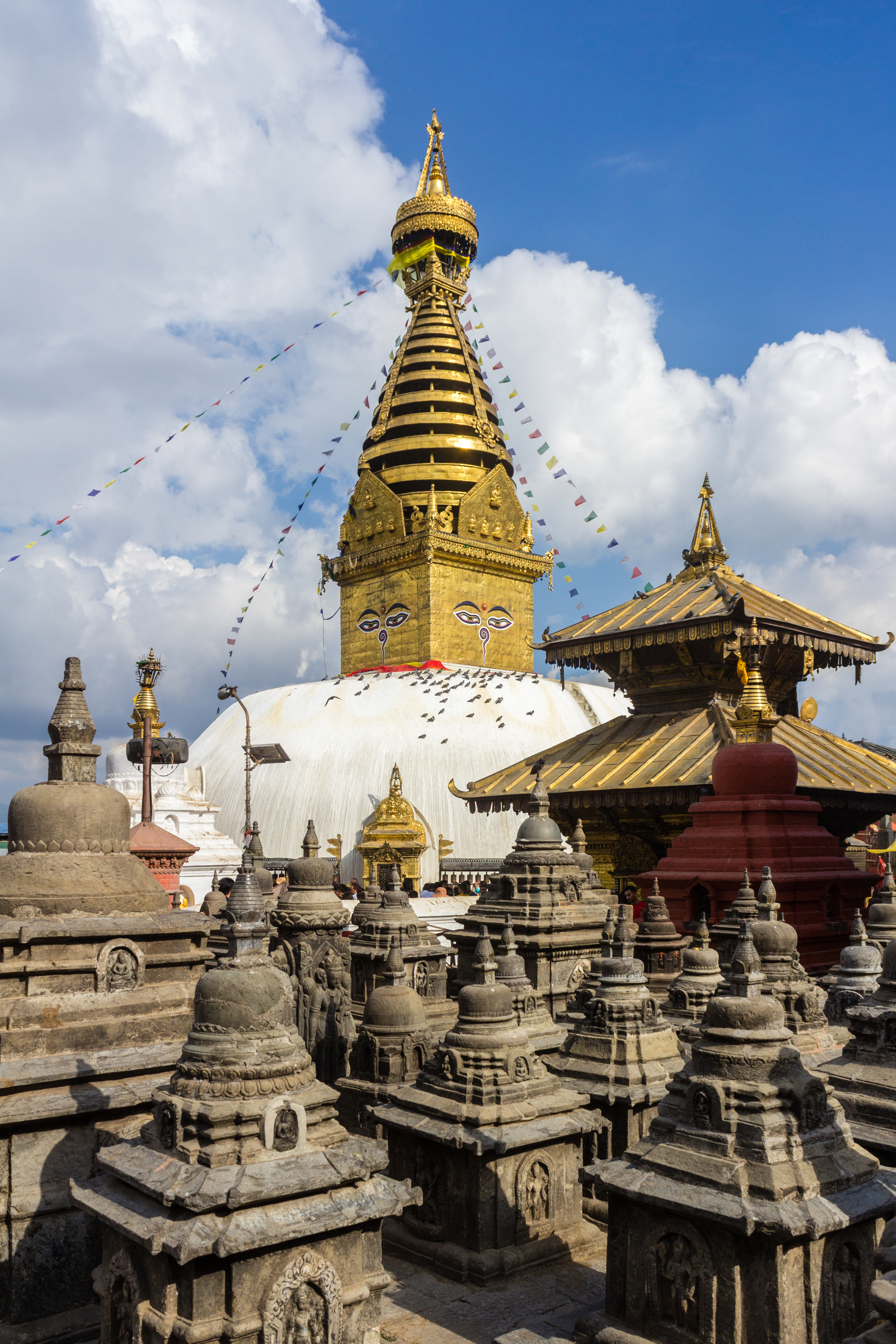
The Swayambhunath Buddhist complex in Kathmandu where Dharmasvamin spent eight years studying

After completing his studies in Tibet, he travelled to the Kathmandu Valley where he spent eight years at Swayambhunath studying under two teachers, Ratnarakshita and Ravindra, both of whom were possibly Indian. The former taught Dharmasvamin about tantric practices like the Guhyasamāja Tantra while the latter teacher disdained tantrism and emphasised other pathways. At the age of 37 in 1234, Dharmasvamin made the decision to travel to India. The objective of Dharmasvamin's tour of India was to visit Bodh Gaya and to study the Buddhist texts with the Indian scholars. Dharmasvamin's own uncle had studied at the monastery of Vikramashila and died eighteen years prior. The journey from Nepal to Tirhut took three months from March to May. However, by the time he reached India, the Buddhist sites in Bihar were in state of ruin. He stayed for some time in Bodh Gaya near the Mahabodhi Temple in the winter of 1234 but had to flee for 17 days following rumours of an attack by Turushkas. Following this, possibly in early 1235, he visited other Buddhist and Hindu sites in the region, including a Kali temple associated with the Sanskrit author, Kalidasa as well as Buddhist sites like Vulture Peak in Rajgir. His next destination was the monastery of Nalanda.

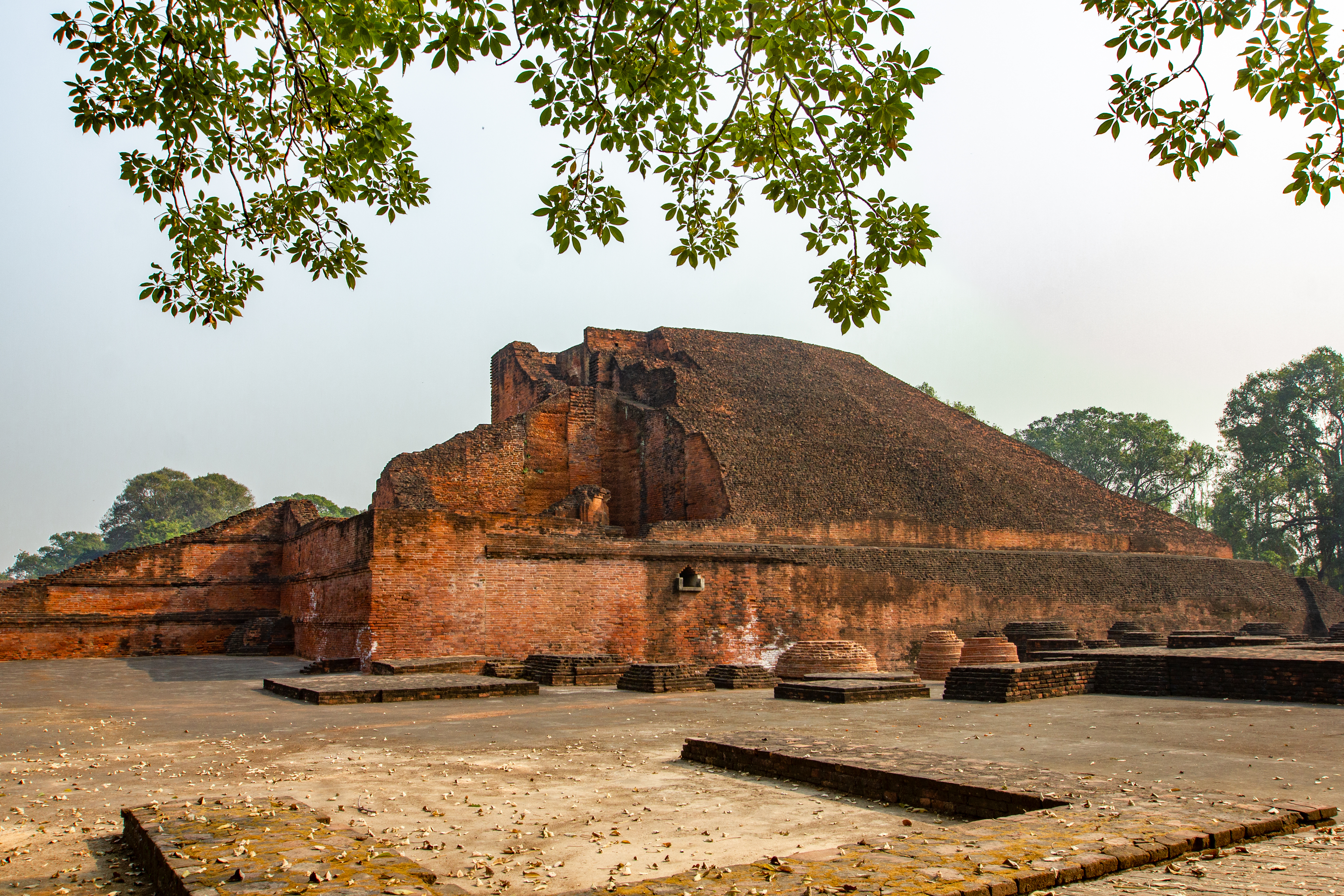
Ruins of Nalanda where Dharmasvamin studied for roughly two years

At Nalanda where he found 80 small viharas, which had been abandoned after being damaged by the Turushkas, and only two of the viharas were functional. Less than hundred monks resided there, and a local king named Buddhasena of the Pithipati dynasty financially supported the Nalanda's 90-year abbot Rahula Shribhadra and the 70 students who stayed there. Dharmasvamin studied under Rahula Shribhadra, who specialised in grammar and also had knowledge of the Tibetan language. Rahula Shribhadra encouraged Dharmasvamin to return to Tibet, as in the previous year, another Tibetan student had died due to a high fever. However, Dharmasvamin stayed in Nalanda for the course of the rainy season, and as predicted by his master, he fell ill. His studies were also continually disrupted by ongoing raids by Turuskas, which sometimes forced the monks to seek shelter in the forest. Despite these challenges, Dharmasvamin completed his studies in March of 1236. In total he spent two years within Magadha.

Dharmasvamin then headed north and crossed the Ganges possibly in May 1236. Dharmasvamin visited the court of the Karnat dynasty of Mithila, which was ruled by Ramasimhadeva. He described Ramasimhadeva as treating him with courtesy, offering him gifts including gold, medicine and rice. Ramasimhadeva even offered Dharmasvamin the role of palace priest despite the former being a Hindu and the latter being a Buddhist. Dharmasvamin declined the offer and in October, began to travel to Nepal which he reached in the early part of 1237. Local devotees presented him with treasures and gold, which he used to purchase more sacred texts. He also received an invitation to visit the Yandog monastery on the Nepal-Tibet border region, which he accepted. He stayed there for a total of four years, where he spent his time collecting manuscripts, among which were the Aṣṭasāhasrikā Prajñāpāramitā Sūtra. He likely left Yandog in 1240 or 1241 with his large number of disciples thronging to wish him well on his journey back to Tibet. He reached Tibet in 1241 and stayed at his monastery in ITe-u-ra. His journey to Nepal and Magadha had made him well-reputed amongst his fellow monks, and the Mongol Emperor, Kublai Khan even sent an embassy requesting him to visit his court. A similar embassy was sent with the same request in 1256. In 1263, Dharmasvamin was 67 years old and began to anticipate his death. In preparation, he gave all his wealth, which consisted of three plates of precious stones, to charity. He died in 1264, and at the time of his death, his disciples considered him a manifestation of the Buddha.

== Sources ==
- Roerich, George (1959). Biography of Dharmasvamin (Chag Lo Tsa-ba Chos-rje-dpal) a Tibetan Monk Pilgrim. K.P. Jayaswal Research Institute.
