= Simraungadh (medieval city) =

Archaeological site in India and Nepal

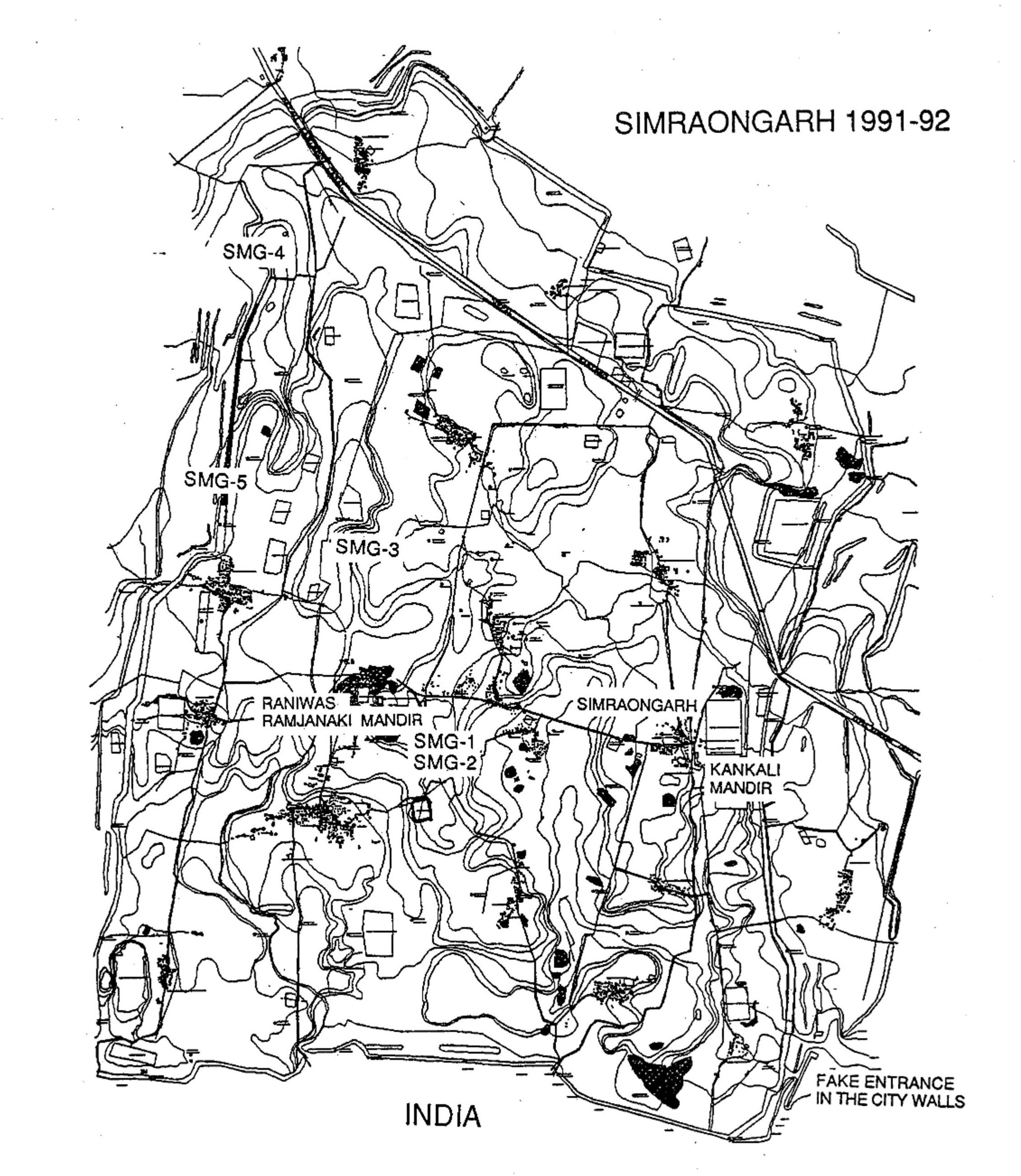
- Location of the medieval city of Simraungadh on the India-Nepal border following archaeological excavations

History
- Founded: 11th century
- Built for: Capital of King Nanyadeva
- Demolished: 1324

Site notes
- Governing body: Tirhut Sarkar

Simraungadh, (also referred to as Simramapura, Simraongarh or Simroungarh) (/ˈsiːmraʊnɡɜːr/) was a fortified city and the main capital of the Karnats of Mithila, founded by its first ruler, Nanyadeva in 1097. At the present time, the excavations show that the city is located on the India-Nepal border. There is also a municipality by the same name in Nepal. The archaeological site is currently split between Bara district in Nepal in the north and East Champaran in Bihar, India in the south, both falling within the Mithila region. The site of the ruins of the Simraungadh fort was the capital of the independent mediaeval period Kingdom of Mithila or Tirhut during the Karnat Dynasty.

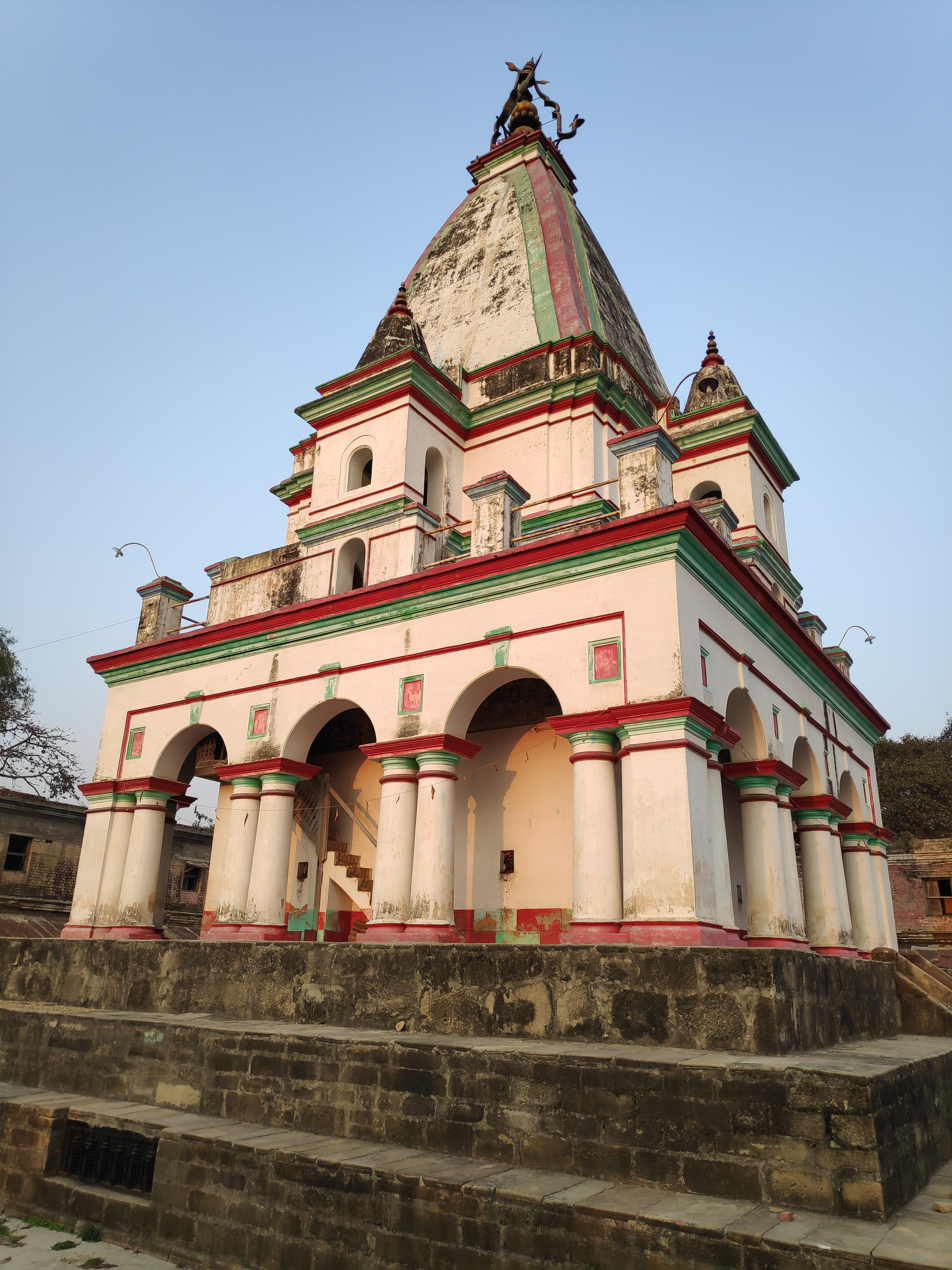
View of the Ram Janaki Mandir in the premises of the Ranibas palace at the Simraungadh Fort.

== Etymology ==
According to archeologists, the name of Simraungadh is derived from the two Indic terms Simar and Gadh. In the early period, plenty of Simal or cotton trees were found in this area. Due to having plenty of Simal or simar trees, it was known as Simar Ban. The term Gadh signifies to the fort of the Karnat Dynasty.

== History ==
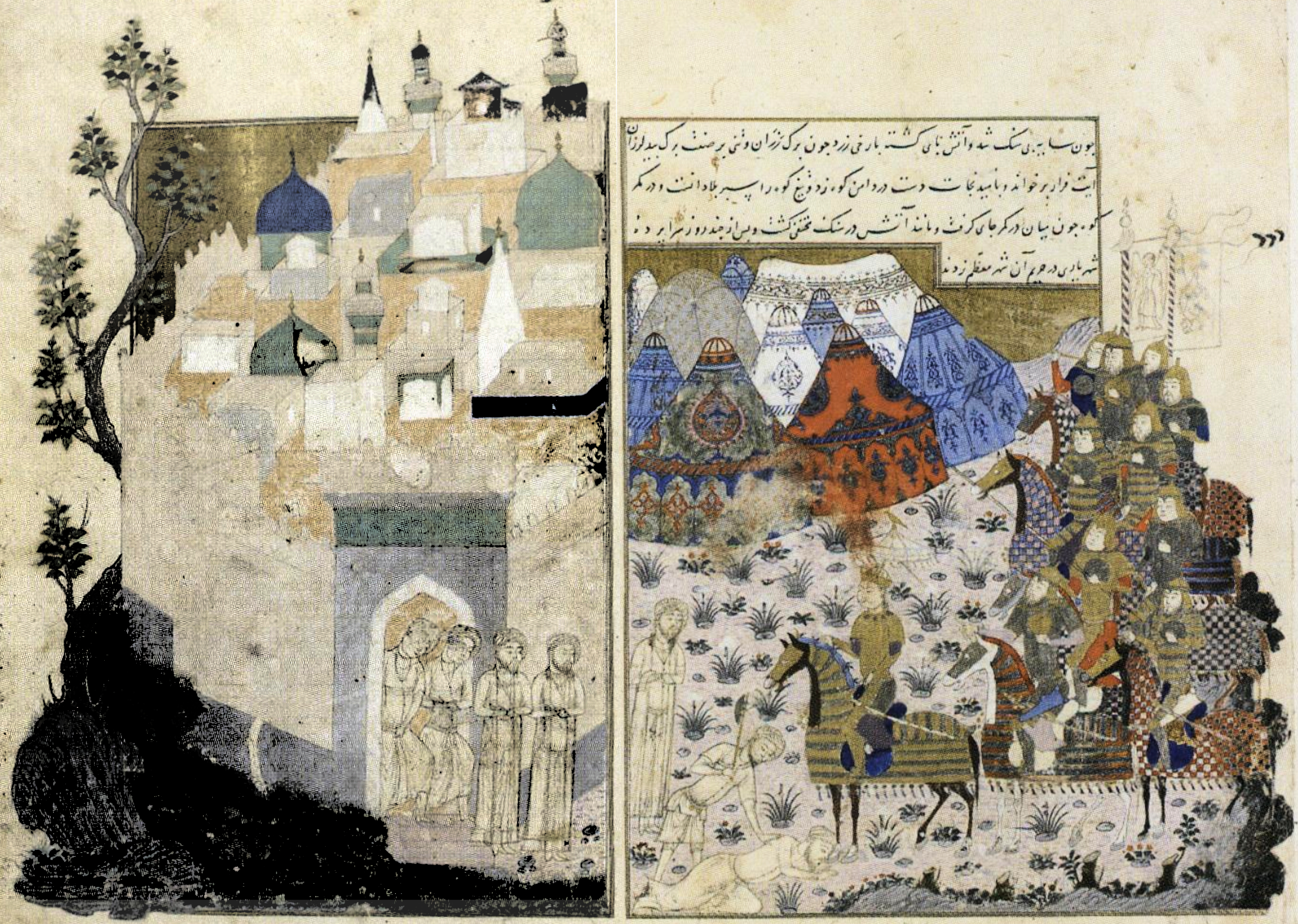
Ghiyath al-Din Tughluq leading his troops in the capture of the city of Simraungadh (1324). A 1410 Jalayrid Mongol illustration of the Basātin al-uns, a book written by Akhsatan Dehlavi al-Hindi, a member of the Tughluq court and an ambassador to Iran. Ca.1410 copy of the 1326 lost original. Istanbul, Topkapi Palace Museum Library, Ms. R.1032.

Harisingh Dev (r. 1295 to 1324 CE), the sixth descendant of Nanyadeva, ruled the Tirhut Kingdom. At the same time, the Tughlaq dynasty came to power and ruled the Delhi sultanate and the whole of Northern India, from 1320 to 1413 CE. In 1324 CE, the founder of the Tughlaq dynasty and Delhi Sultan, Ghiyasuddin Tughlaq turned his attention towards Bengal. The Tughlaq army invaded Bengal and on his way back to Delhi, The sultan heard about the Simraungarh which was flourishing inside the jungle. The last king of the Karnata dynasty, Harisingh Dev didn't show his strength and left the fort as he heard the news of approaching army of the Tughlaq Sultan towards the Simraungarh. The Sultan and his troop stayed there for 3 days and cleared the dense forest. Finally on day 3, the army attacked and entered the huge fort whose walls was tall and surrounded by 7 big ditches.

The remains are still scattered all over the Simroungarh region. King Harisingh Deva fled northwards into then-Nepal. The son of Harisingh Dev, Jagatsingh Dev, married Nayak Devi, the widowed princess of Bhaktapur.

== Medieval city plan and fortification ==
City plan according to Cassiano Beligatti in 1740

The medieval city of Simraungadh was enclosed within an impressive system of earthen ramparts and infilled ditches. The fortification of the medieval city has a rectangular shape and ground plan. The fortifications of Simraungadh are called Baahi locally and remembered as a Labyrinth. The fort is spread in 6 Kos and the main enclosure is about 7.5 km north–south and 4.5 km east–west. The eastern and western sides of the fort were built over two natural embankments. The western side of the fort was dry in comparison to the eastern side. The Labyrinth and the powerful defence system of the city were well planned to protect from the river floods, and enemies and regulate agriculture from controlled flow of water from the ditches showing the ability of the Kingdom.

During the reign of Rama Singh Deva (r. 1227 - 1285 CE) over Simraungadh, the Tibetan monk Dharmasvamin visited the fortified city in 1236 AD on his way back to Nepal and Tibet from Nalanda. He made the following remarks regarding the palace and fortification system of Pa-ta (Simraungadh),

The city was surrounded by seven tall walls, and the palace had eleven large gates and was surrounded by 21 ditches filled with water and rows of trees. The height of the city walls was equal to that of a Tibetan fort. The protective measures were taken due to Tughlaq armies, who led an army expedition but failed to reach it.

After the fall and decline of the Karnat dynasty from Simraungadh, the region was either controlled by Oiniwar rulers or Makwanpur rulers until the Unification of Nepal in 1768 AD. During the period, an Italian Missionary traveller Cassiano Beligatti, with seven other missionaries reached this place on their way to Kathmandu Valley from Patna on 29 February 1740. He describes his journey on his travelling manuscript about this place is as follows,

There were some old ruins, and some seemed to be remains of substantial buildings. The city was situated in the quasi-labyrinth enclosed by high walls and was impossible to enter except in a single spot. There were four fortresses, which were evenly distributed from place to place within the enclosures of the labyrinth; and these enclosures had a distance from one side to the other of about a Kos or two miles, and the walls were extremely high with a width in proportion.

The Simraon stone inscription of Nanyadeva found at Simraungadh records the construction of some buildings being made by him.

== Monuments ==
The city of Simraungadh holds several monuments, archaeological remains and historical palaces related to the Karnat Dynasty in the Mithila or Tirhut Kingdom. Some of the monuments are Kankali Ishra Mata Shrine, Ishra Pond, Samadhi of Mansha Baba, Ranibas and Ram-Janaki Mandir, etc. From these historical sites many statues and other artefacts are extracted frequently in the region. Several statues and artefacts from these sites are being stolen.

Ranibas was the residence of the queen in the kingdom. It was built by a Karnat King Shiva Singh for his daughter Queen Isri Devi. In the early period, there were 208 wells in the campus of the Ranibas. But later most of the wells were either buried or dried up. Presently, only few of them are survived. In 1850, the Nepalese Army General Jit Jung Rana, built a temple called Ram-Janaki Mandir at the campus, in the memory of his father.

Similarly, the Samadhi of Mansha Baba is 700 years old domed building. It is a tomb of a revered saint Mansha Baba.

== Gallery ==
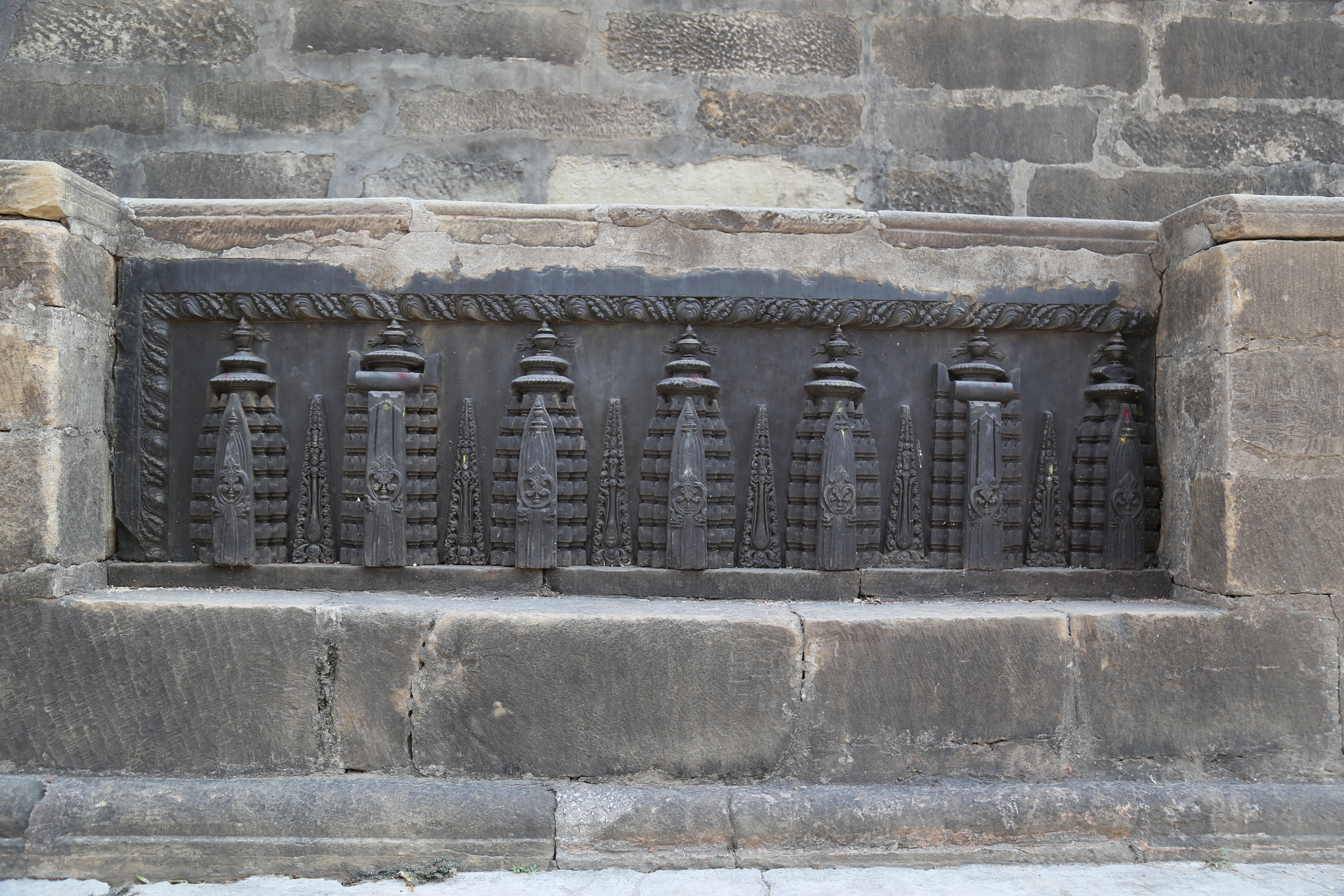
Simraungadh Toran Dwar Statue

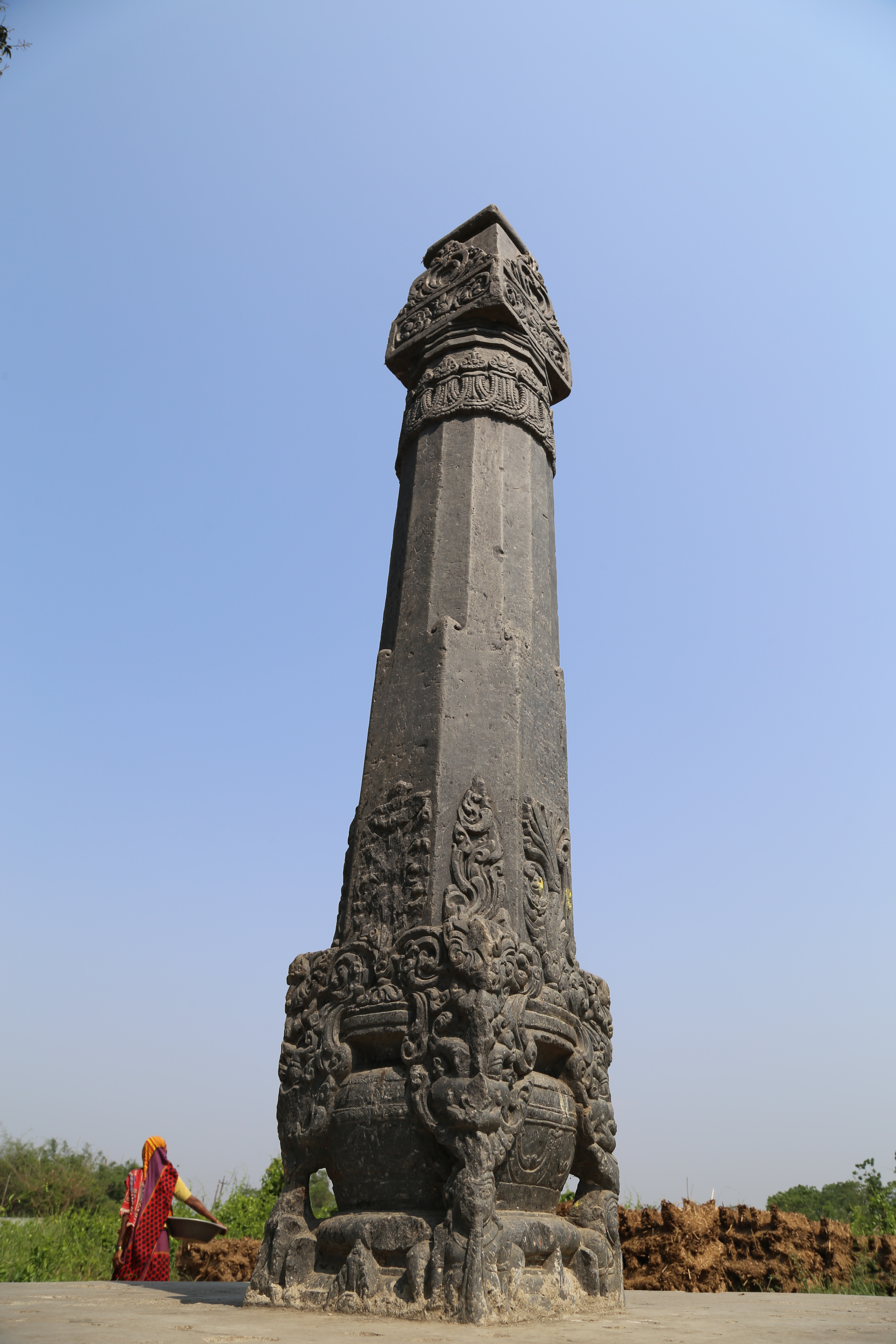
Pillar at Simraungadh

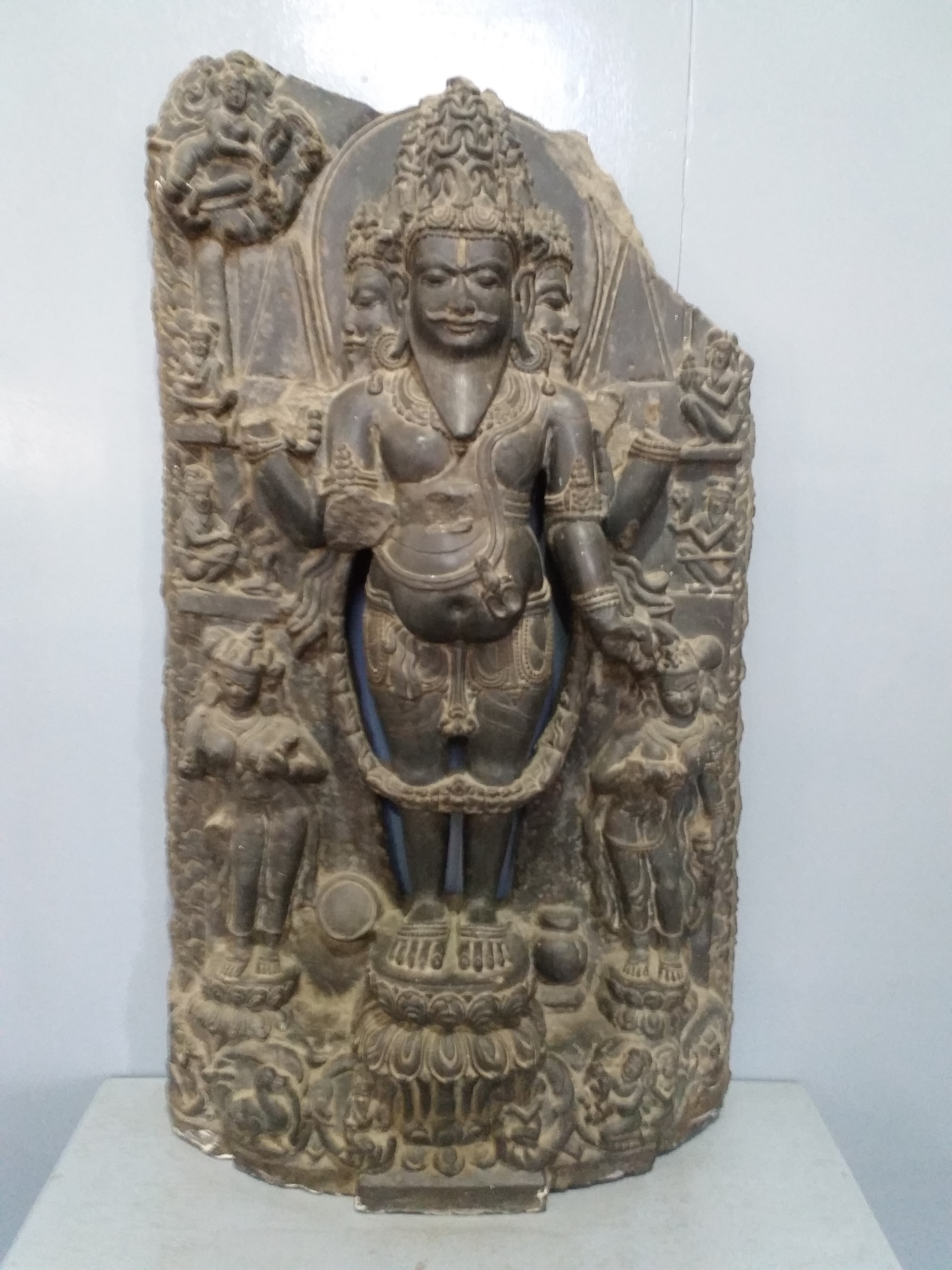
Statue of Brahma from Simraungadh at National Museum Kathmandu

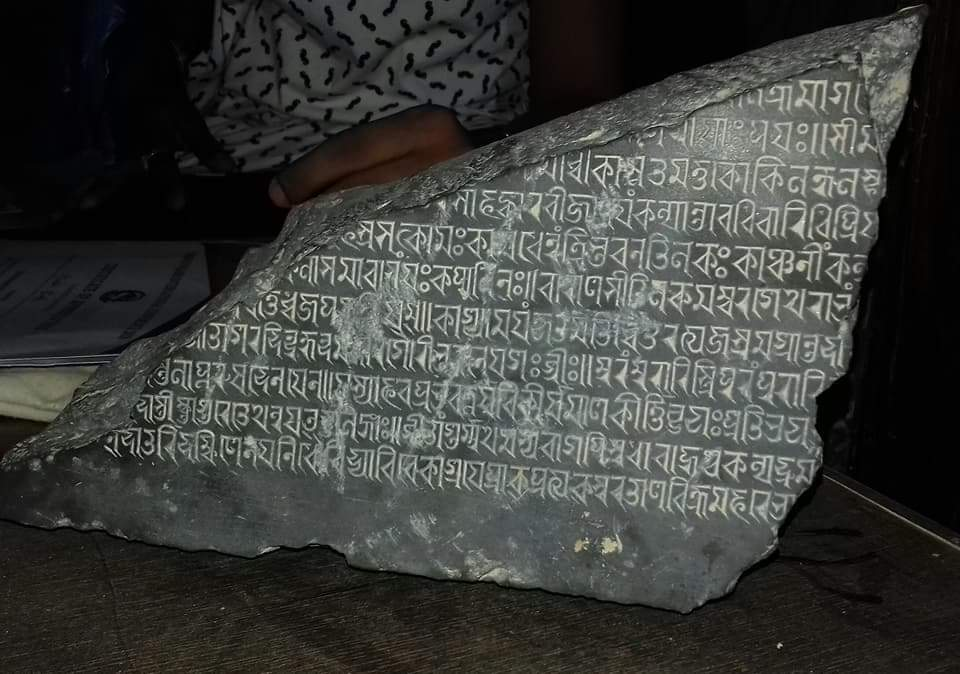
12th century Stone Inscription from Simraungadh in Tirhuta script

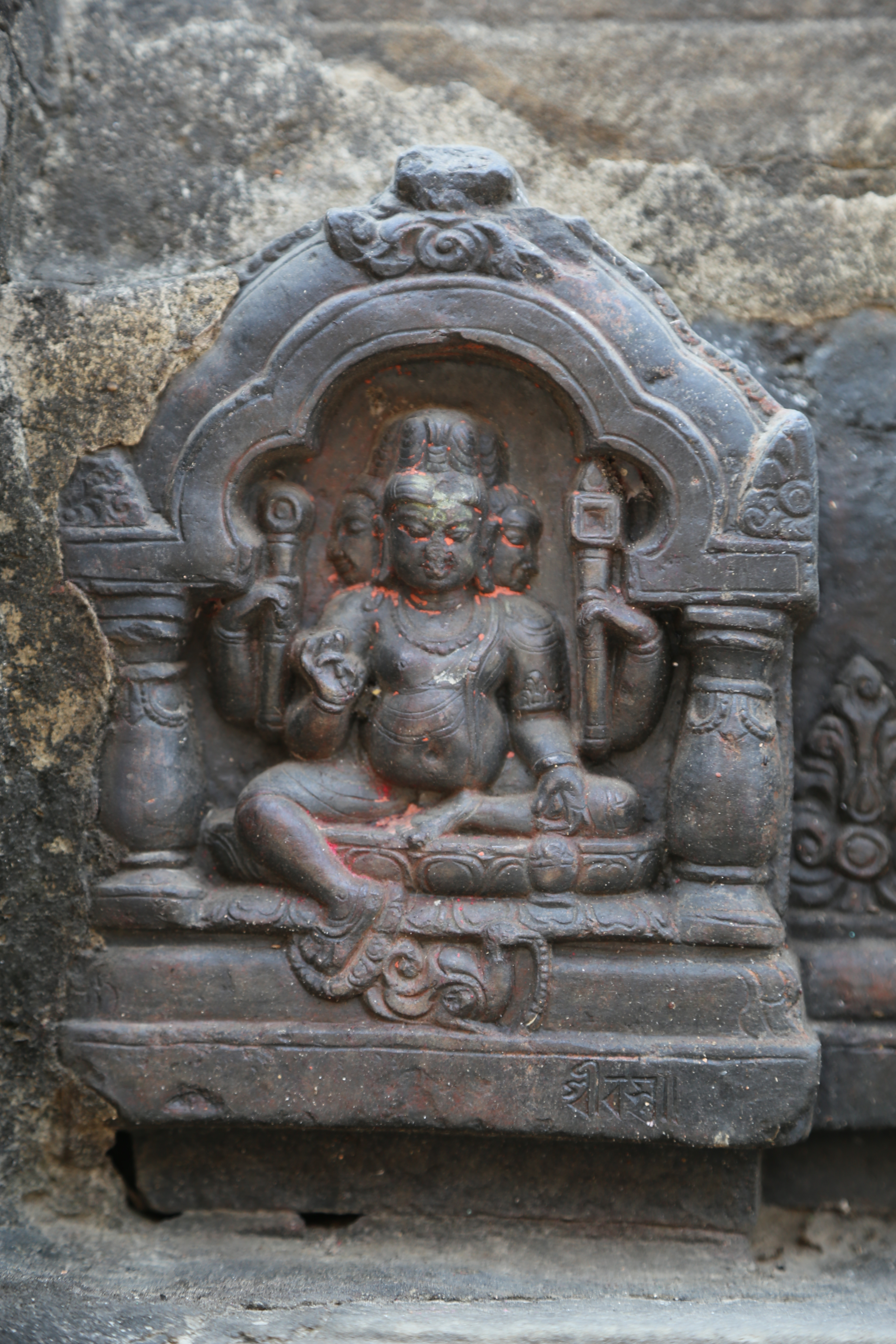
Simraungadh Brahma statue

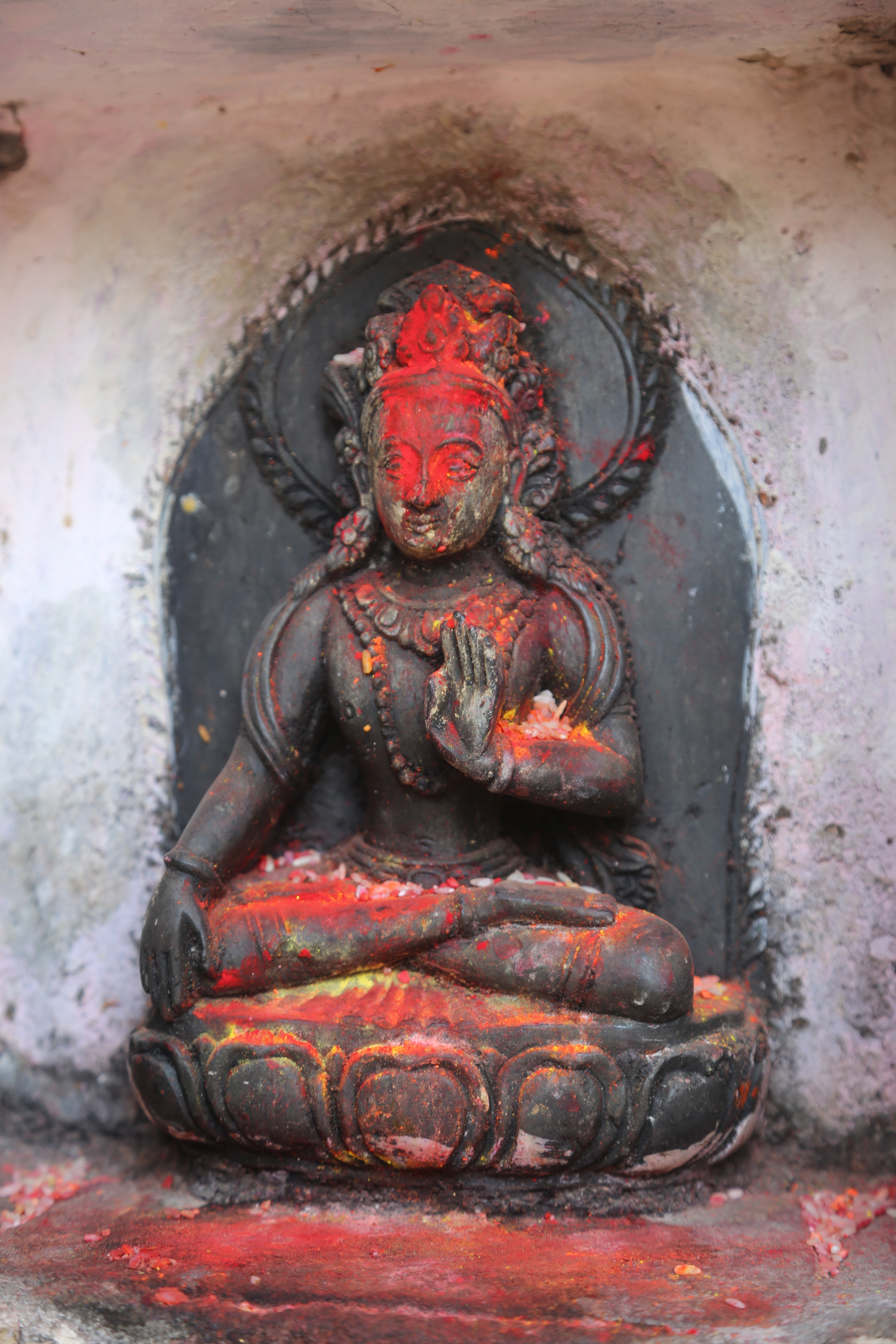
Statue of the Buddha found at Simraungadh

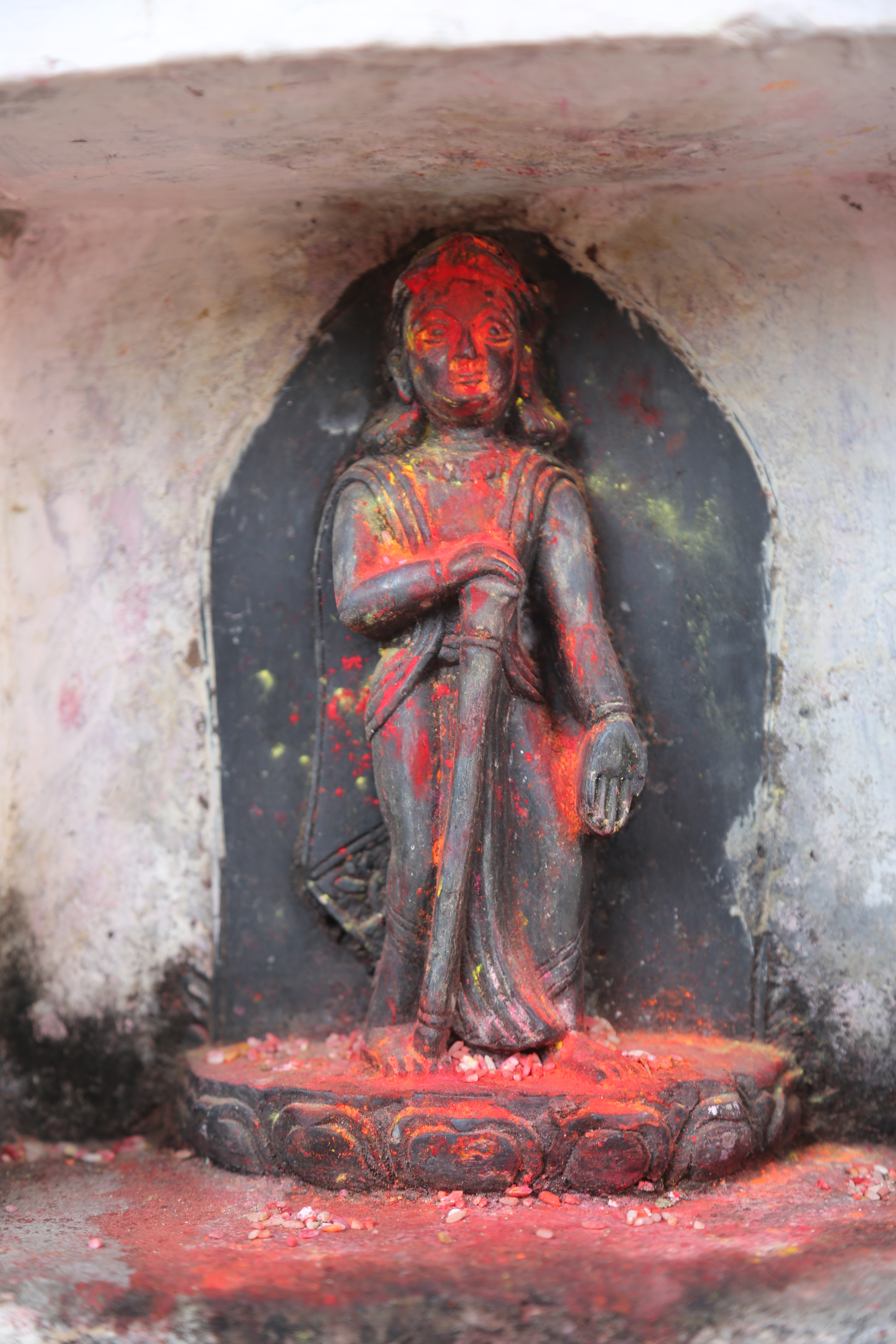
Dvarapala found at Simraungadh

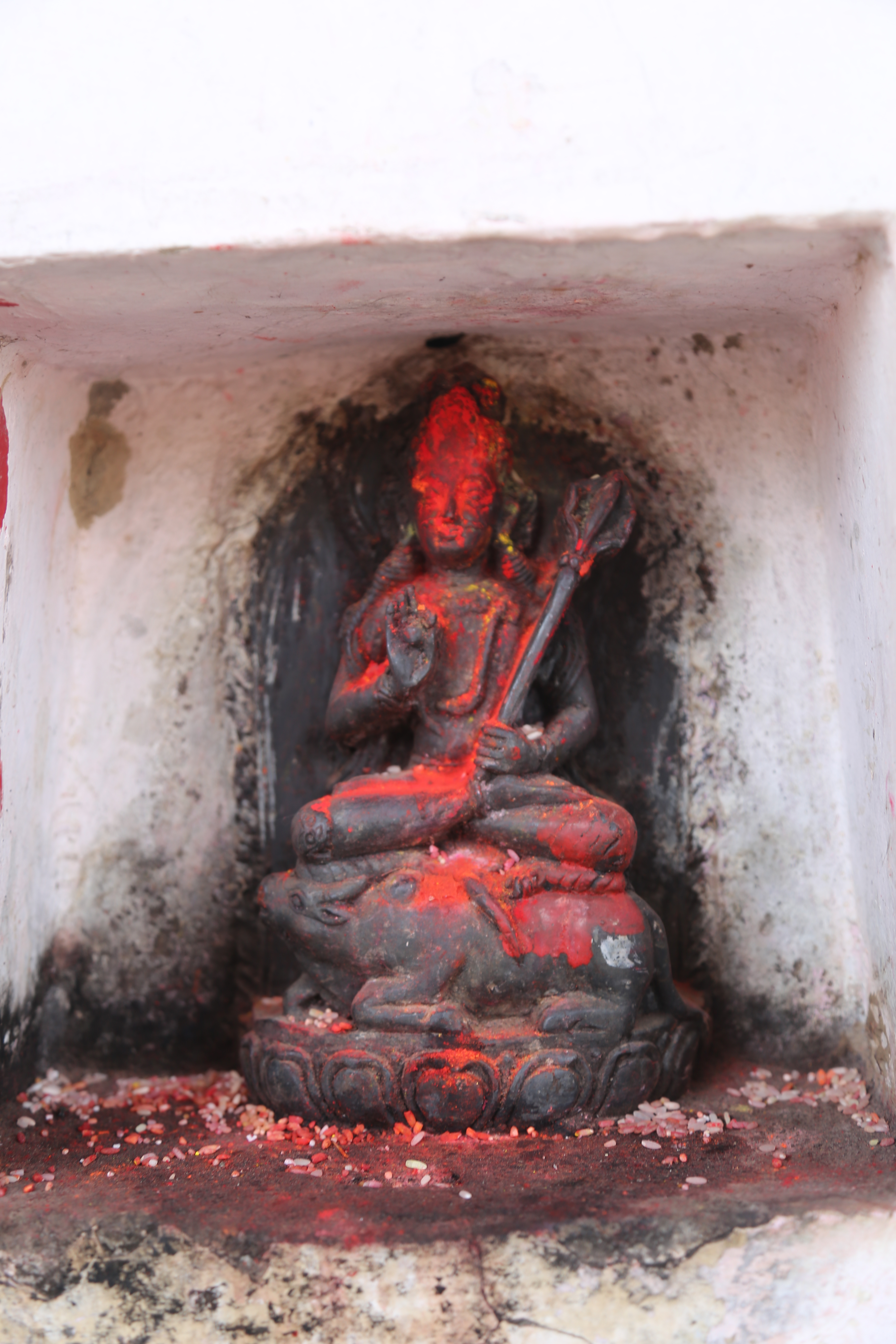
Shiva found at Simraungadh

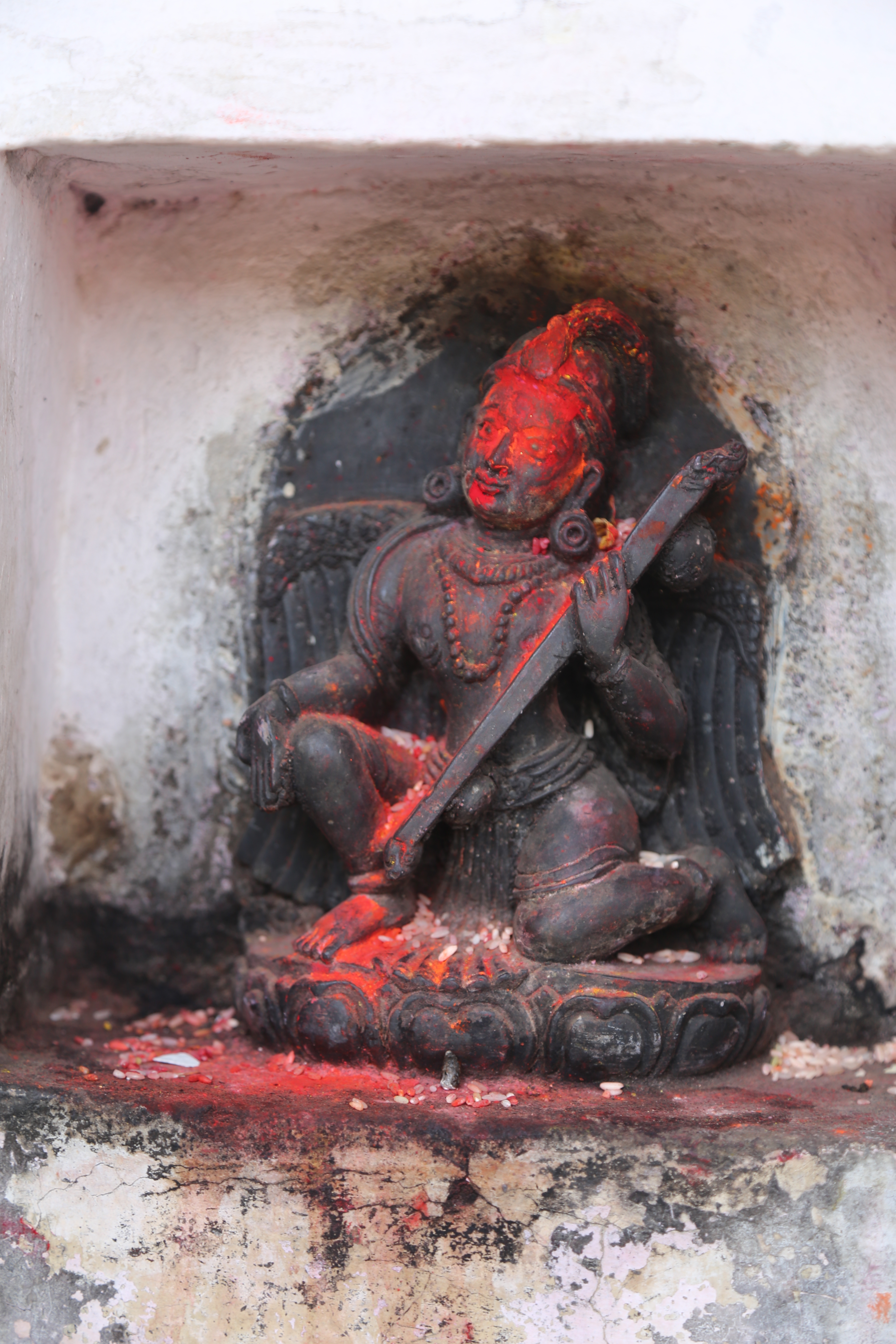
Statue of Garuda

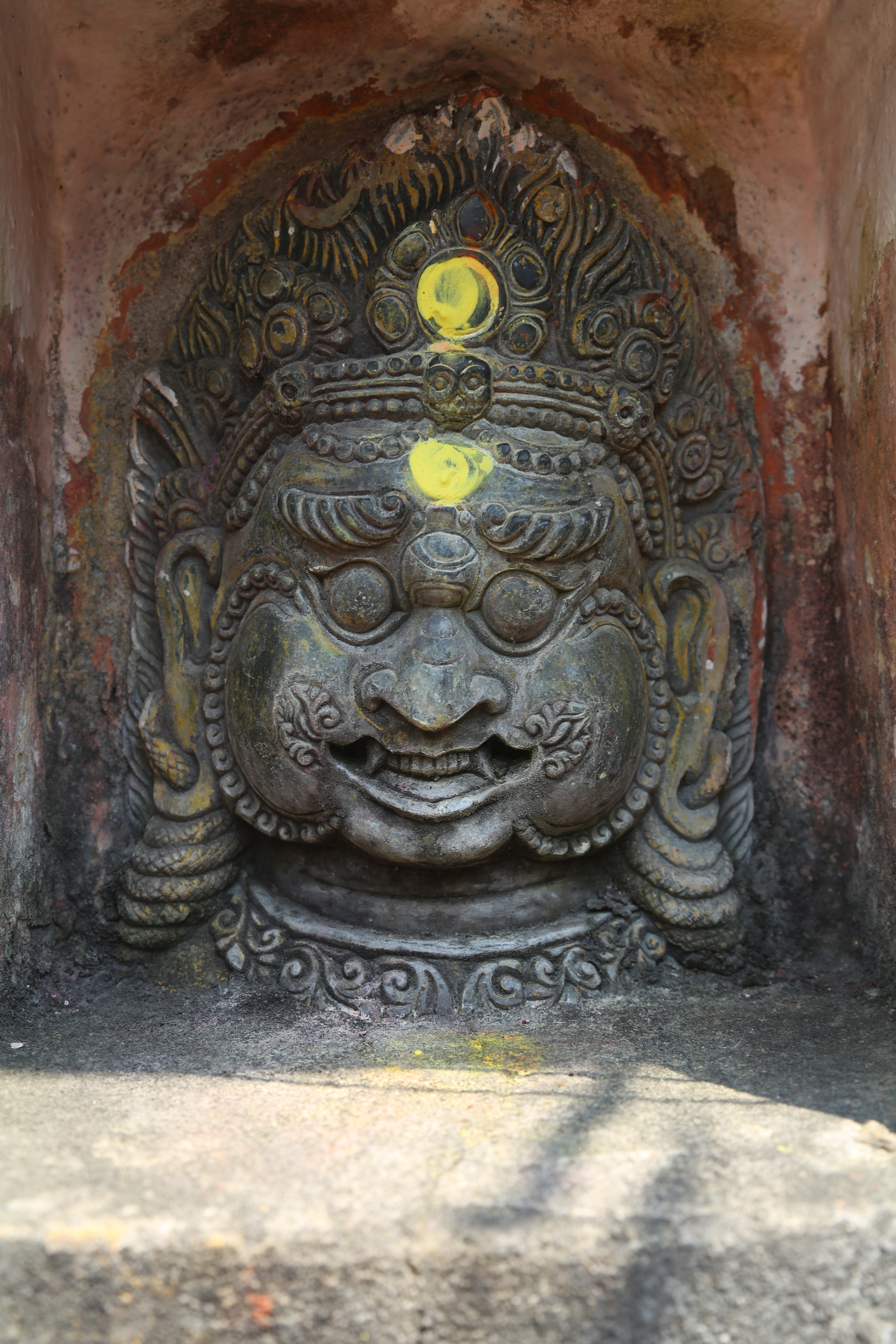
Bhairava statue
