= Purushapariksha =

Sanskrit literature of Vidyapati

- Purusha Pariksha
- Original title: पुरुषपरीक्षा
- Also known as: The Test of a Man
- Author(s): Vidyapati
- Patron: Shivasimha
- Dedicated to: Panchatantra tradition in Mithila
- Language: Sanskrit
- Date: 1410 AD
- Genre: Sanskrit text of Vidyapati

Purushapariksha (Sanskrit: पुरुषपरीक्षा) is a literary Sanskrit text composed by the eminent Maithil scholar Vidyapati. It was composed during the period of the 14th - 15th century CE in the Mithila region of the Indian subcontinent. The text was written during the reign of King Shivasimha of the Oiniwar dynasty in the Mithila Kingdom. It contains 44 stories of the Panchatantra tradition in Mithila. The lessons of these stories function as a moral and practical guide, providing insights for kings and administrators on ethics, human nature, and governance. It is a very important Sanskrit text composed by the poet Vidyapati.

"Neither by wealth, nor by strength, nor by noble birth is a man made; through knowledge and humility alone is one called a true man."

— Vidyapati, Purushapariksha

== Etymology ==
Purushapariksha is a compound Sanskrit word having two terms Purusha and Pariksha. The first term Purusha means a man or a person and the second term Pariksha means test or examination. Thus literal meaning of the compound word Purushapariksha is "the test of a man".

== Description ==
The Purushapariksha is a ethics text (Nitigranth) of the great Maithil poet Vidyapati. It was composed in the guidance of the King Shivasimha in Mithila. It was composed in 1410 AD. During the composition of the text, the former King Devasimha was alive. Devasimha was the father of the King Shivasimha.

In the text Purushapariksha, the poet Vidyapati says "An ordinary person does not have the power to test persons, that is, a person cannot know what a person is like and how to treat whom. If such skill is acquired in the person to test, the same mistake will never be made again".

== Translations ==
The original Sanskrit text Purushapariksha of Vidyapati has been translated into several other languages. It has been translated into the languages of Hindi, English, Bengali, Maithili and Nepali, etc. In 1815, it was first translated by Har Prasad Ray in Bengali language. After that in the year 1830, it was translated by Kali Krishna Bahadur into English language. Further, the Maithili poet Chanda Jha in 1885 initiated to translate the text into Maithili language. It was published in the year 1888 through the Raj Darbhanga Press. In the recent year 2024, the original Sanskrit text of the Purushapariksha was translated into Nepali language by Dhirendra Premarshi.
