= Birkul Raj =

Indian dynasty of Kings from Bengal

The Birkul Raj family also known as Birkul Royal Family, was a feudal dynasty, identifying with the Mahishya caste, established under the Bhanja kings of Mayurbhanj state, as their feudatories, in the year 1500 that ruled over south-eastern, Mughal era Midnapore district. However, by the time of the British occupation, they were reduced to ruling over certain regions around present-day Digha and northern fringes of Odisha.

== History ==
Before the arrival of the British, vast areas of present-day Medinipur and Odisha were under the rule of the Mayurbhanj rulers (Bhanja Kings). Around in 1500 AD, for some reason the farmers of the Medinipur region rose in rebellion which created disorder in the Gajapati Empire. Therefore, Prataparudra Deva ordered his vassals, the Bhanja rulers of Mayurbhanj, to subdue the rebellion. They in turn, delegated their work to one, Bhuiyan Sagar Ray, a Mahishya by caste and a resident of Bamra kingdom, to carry out the task. At that time, on the orders of the Bhanj king, Sagar Ray skillfully suppressed the peasant uprising in the Birkul (Digha) area. As a reward, the Bhanj king established him as the Raja of the Birkul dandapat, encompassing the village forts of Birkul, Kakrachoura and Mirgoda.

Raja Sagar Ray, fought wars with the neighbouring kingdoms of the Moyna Raj and the Kajlagarh Raj to consolidate his control over the area. Sagar Ray, established himself as the dominant landlord of the area and donated lands to Brahmins and began to perform elaborate Yajnas and pujas. He established temples in Sagareswar village to Bridheshwar Shiva and Buddhadev Mahadev, his family deities. Sagar Ray was succeeded by his son Raja Jadunath Ray, followed by his grandson Raja Puroshattam Ray.

Sagar Ray's great-grandson Raja Narahari Ray, further divided his Kingdom, by making his eldest son the Raja of Birkul, his second son as a Chowdhury to the Nawabs of Bengal, and his third and youngest son as the Zamindar of Kakrachoura. Among them, the Kingdom of Birkul, became one of the most profitable salt producing areas in the entire district of Medinipore. Raj Ballabh Bhuiyan Ray, the then ruler, also had some scuffles with the authority of the newly implemented Company rule.

== Later outcome ==
In 1760s, Raja Sarveshwar Ray, held the whole Zamindari for quite some time. The other half was purchased by the Raja of Malighati. In 1781, Udayananda Chowdhury of the other branch of the family, was imprisoned by the Nawabs of Bengal at Murshidabad for defaulting on taxes. On the account of Raja Sarveshwar not having any sons, he was succeeded by his cousin, a descendant of Raja Sagar Ray on the maternal side, Raja Lal Bihari Singha Gajendra Mohapatra, the Raja of Turkagarh. Later, the British Raj recognised Lal bihari's grandson Jashodanandan Mohapatra as the ruler of Birkul.

== Gallery ==
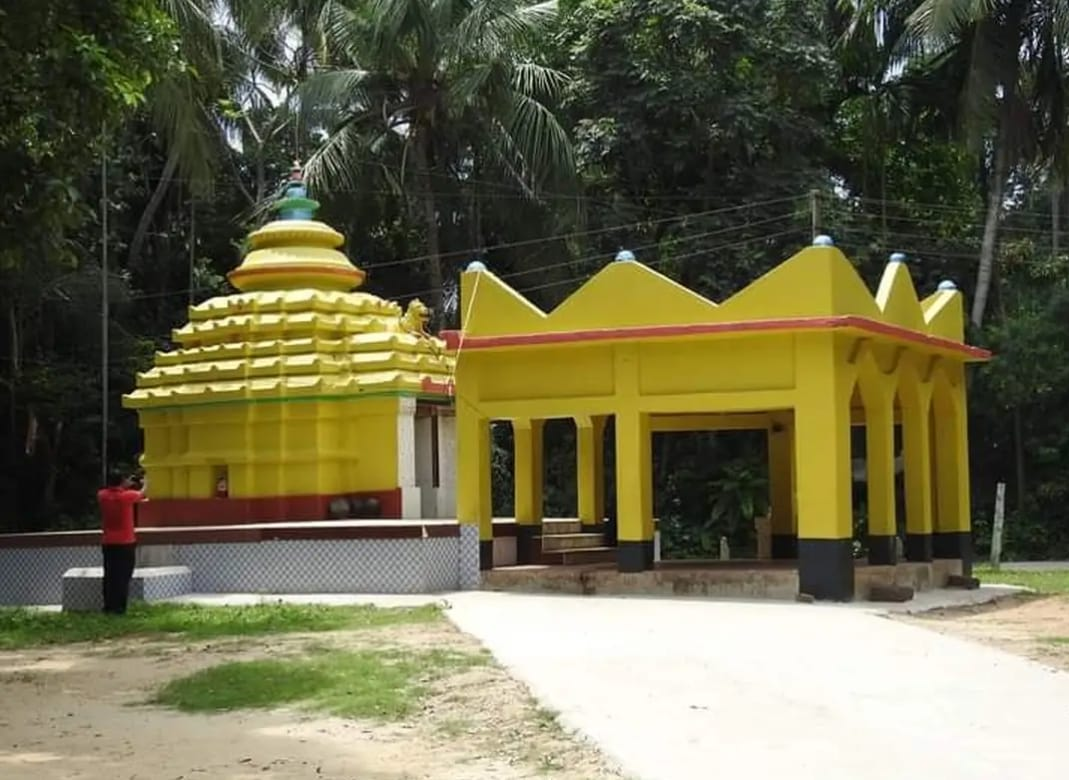
Briddheshwar Shiva Temple of Raja Sagar Ray

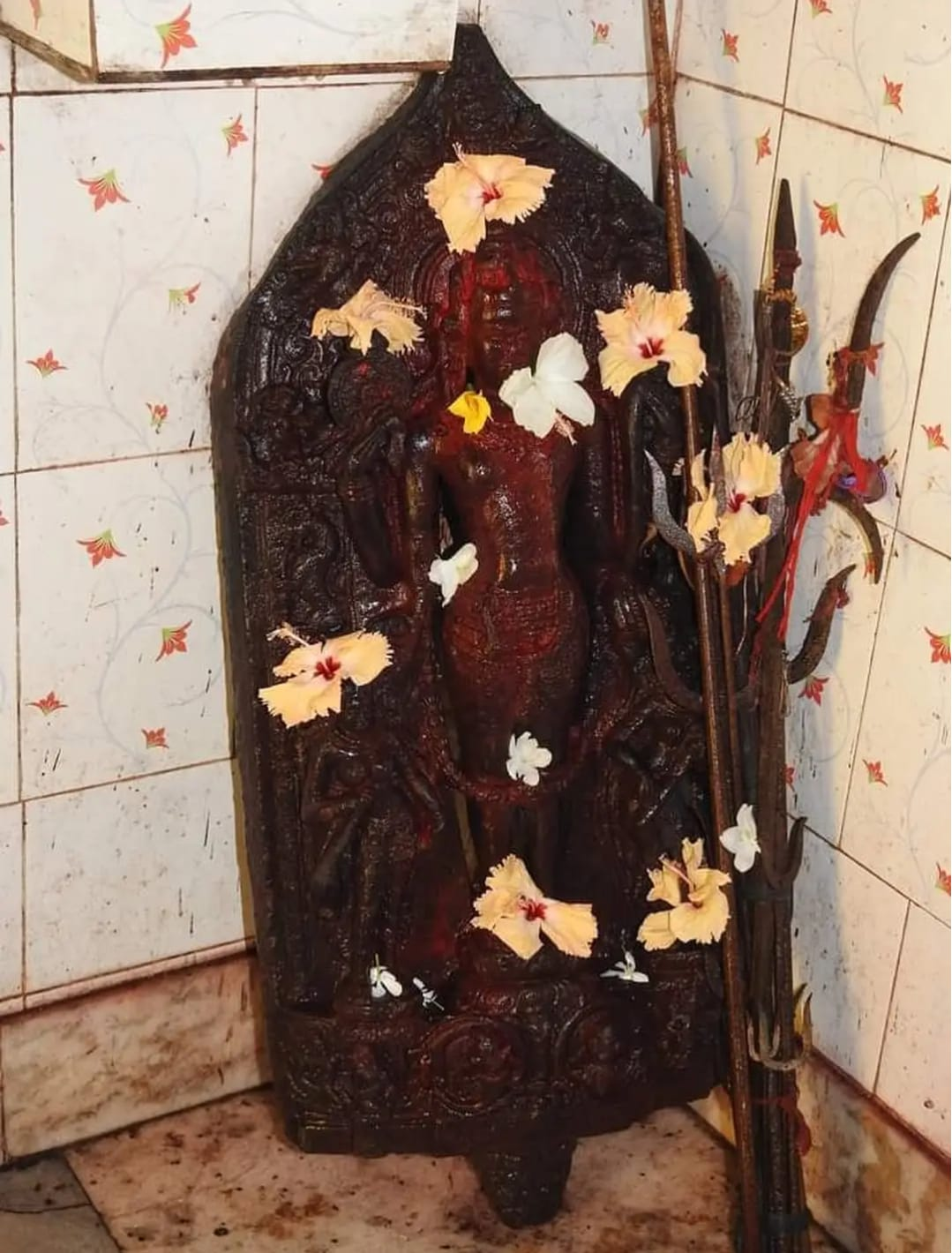
Buddhadeva Mahadav, the Kuldevta of Birkul Raj

== See also ==
- Mayurbhanj State
- Gajapati Empire
- Prataparudra Deva
- Mahishya
- Bahubalindra Royal Family
- Tamluk Royal Family
