= Khandarui Garh Raj =

Indian dynasty of Kings from Bengal

Khandrui Garh Raj Family Turka Raj
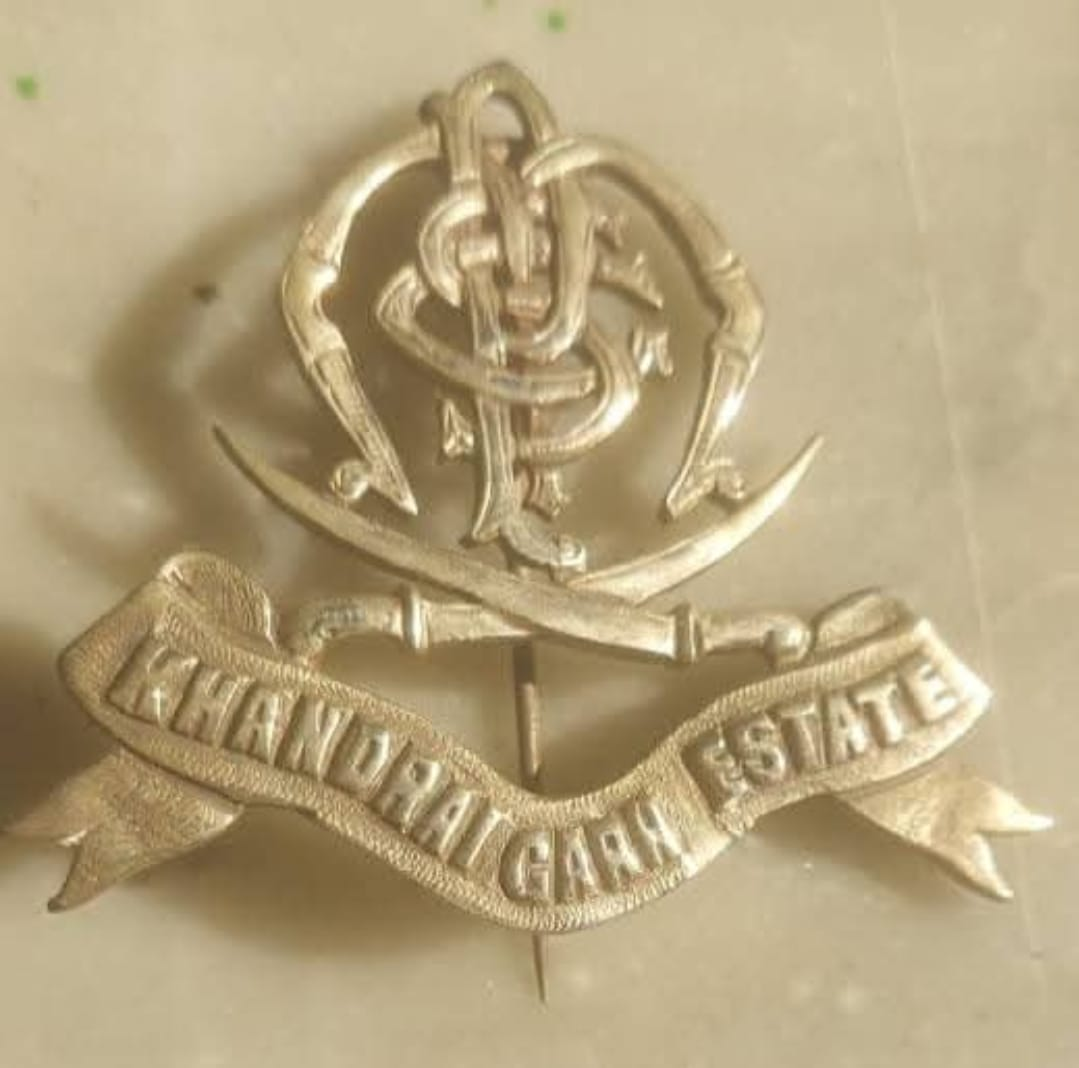
- Royal Seal of the Family
- Country: India
- Current region: Medinipur, West Bengal
- Origin: Puri, Odisha
- Founder: Raja Krishnadas Singha
- Titles: Raja, Samanta, Bhuiyan, Singha Gajendra Mahapatra
- Connected members: Tamluk Raj, Moyna Raj, Birkul Raj
- Estate: Khandruigarh Estate

The Turkagarh Raj Family, also known as Khandarui Garh Raj or Singha Gajendra Mohapatra dynasty, was a feudal royal lineage, established in the present day Khandrui village of the Dantan block of Medinipur region in the 16th century under the Gajapati Dynasty (Chalukya Dynasty of Mukunda Deva), which later emerged from being a feudatory to an independent royal lineage.

== History ==
During the reign of Gajapati Raja Harichandan Mukundadev, the Telengi Raja was appointed as a feudal lord of the Turkachour Pargana. When the Turkachour Samanta Raja rebelled by refusing to pay taxes to Harichandan for a long time, the Raja Mukunda Deva sent his Samanta, Krishnadas Singha, a Mahishya by caste, to suppress the Telengi Raja. General Krishnadas with great martial skill defeated the Telengi Raja. He cut off his head and presented it to Raja Mukundadev as a gift. Impressed by his bravery Harichandan Mukundadev appointed his General Krishnadas Singha as the new Samanta of Turkachour Pargana. Presenting him, with the Royal title of "Gajendra Mohapatra".

Krishnadas's grandson, Raja Rajballabh Singha Gajendra Mohapatra, was invited to the Mughal Court at Delhi, and was presented with a royal firman by the Shah Shuja, the Diwan of Bengal, Rajballabh's grandson, Jashodanandan Singha Gajendra Mohapatra was the Raja of Turka, when the East India Company took over Medinipur. Furthermore, he was also recognised as the successor to the throne of the Birkul Raj maternally.

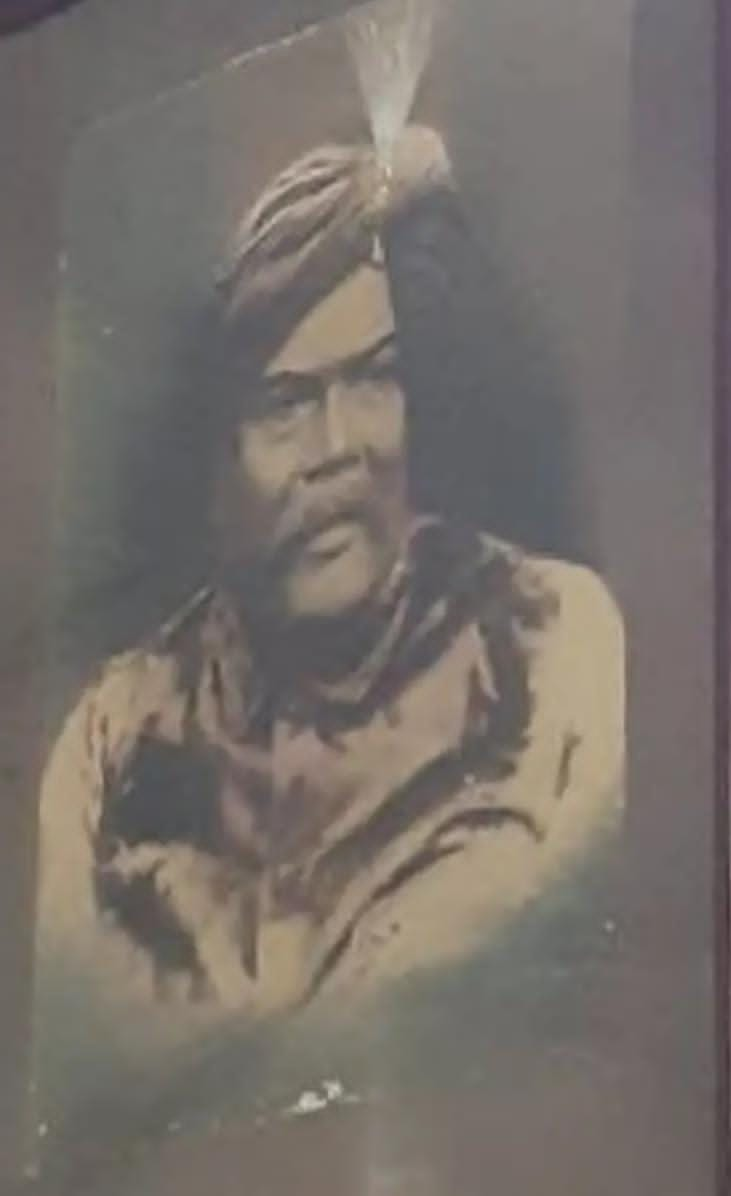
Raja Kali Prasanna Singha Gajendra Mohapatra of Khandruigarh Raj.

Raja Kali Prasanna Singha Gajendra Mohapatra ascended the throne of Turka in the 1880s. During this time, Midnapore district became the hotbed for the Indian independence movement. The Raja also actively involved himself in the movement. In 1903, he was among the two persons from Midnapore to have attended the session of the Indian National Congress being held in Madras. He also actively helped his nephew, the stalwart revolutionary, Hemchandra Kanungo to gather funds for his journey and sojourn to learn the techniques of revolution, in Europe, more specifically in Paris and London.

The Raja became involved in the movement to such an extent that in the aftermath of the Alipore bomb case, his name emerged along with the names of many other prominent personalities of the district in the list of conspirators of the Midnapore conspiracy case. But fortunately enough, Lord Sinha, the then Advocate-General of Bengal withdrew the case, and Kali Prasanna was held to be absolved of the supposed offence against the British Raj.

The revolutionary Hemchandra Kanungo was maternally related to the family. His mother Komal Kamini Debi was the sister of Raja Kali Prasanna Singha Gajendra Mohapatra. As a result of which Hemchandra spent a part of his childhood in the Turkagarh estate, a time about which he wrote in his books on the revolutionary movement. Later, after laying the foundations of the Medinipur branch of the Anushilan Samiti, he used the Palace grounds for training of the revolutionaries. Some of the revolutionaries who visited the Palace grounds being Khudiram Bose, Kanailal Dutta, and Satyendranath Basu.

== Origin and family ==
Raja Krishnadas Singha was the founder of the present Turkagarh royal family, whose ancestors are believed to have originally resided in Khorda near Puri district of Odisha. The Mahishya community considers the Turka Raja belonging to their community. The Turka Raja Mukundadev, who held the title 'Singha Gajendra Mahapatra' was conferred with the honorific title ‘Gajendra'.

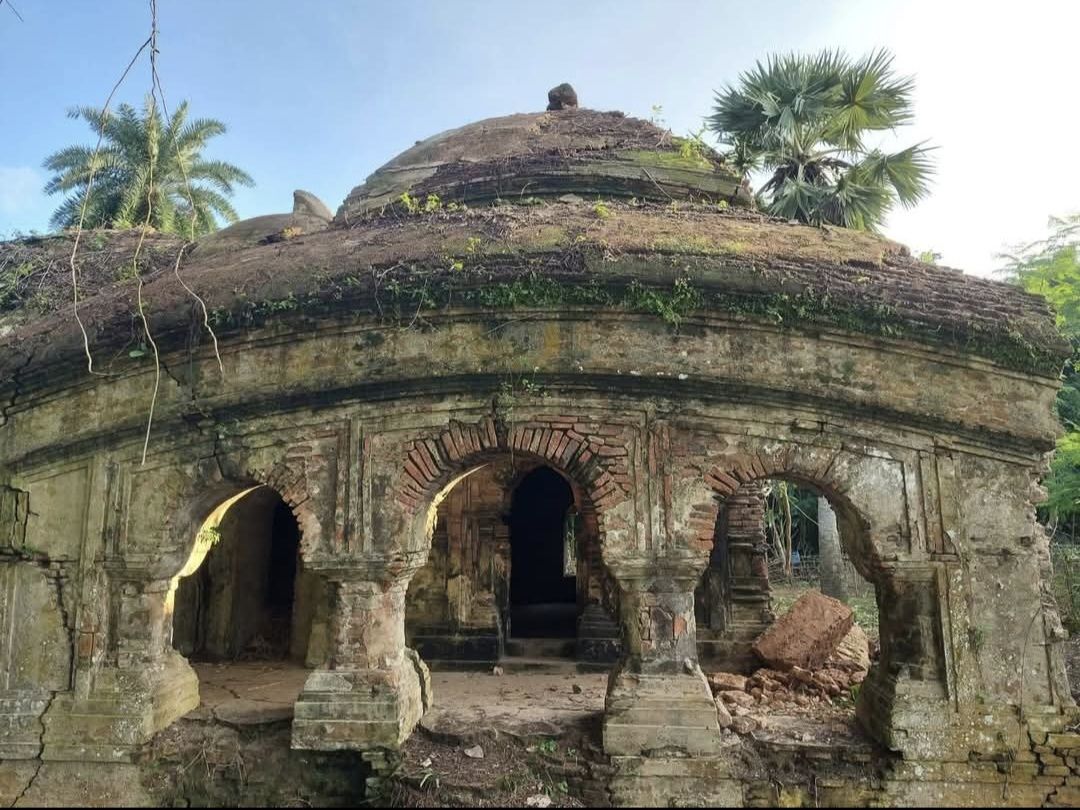
Radhaballbh Temple is said to have been built by Krishnadas Singha Gajendra Mohapatra, the first Raja of Khandruigarh as the abode of his family's Kuldevta.

== Temples ==
The family had commissioned many temples in the precincts of Khandrui. The temples housed many Hindu deities. Such as Shiva, Durga and many others. Most important of the temples is the Radhaballav Temple built in the Bengal temple architecture style, which contained the Kuladevata of the family. The temple was said to have been built by the first Raja, Krishnadas Singha Gajendra Mohapatra himself. However, years to neglect and ignorance led to the ruin of the Terracotta works on the temple. But recently, restoration works have been taken up by eager villagers reminiscent of the memories of the Royal Family and descendants of the family. A trust called the "Khandrui Ajay Singha Gajendra Mohapatra trust" had been created for the restoration of the temples.

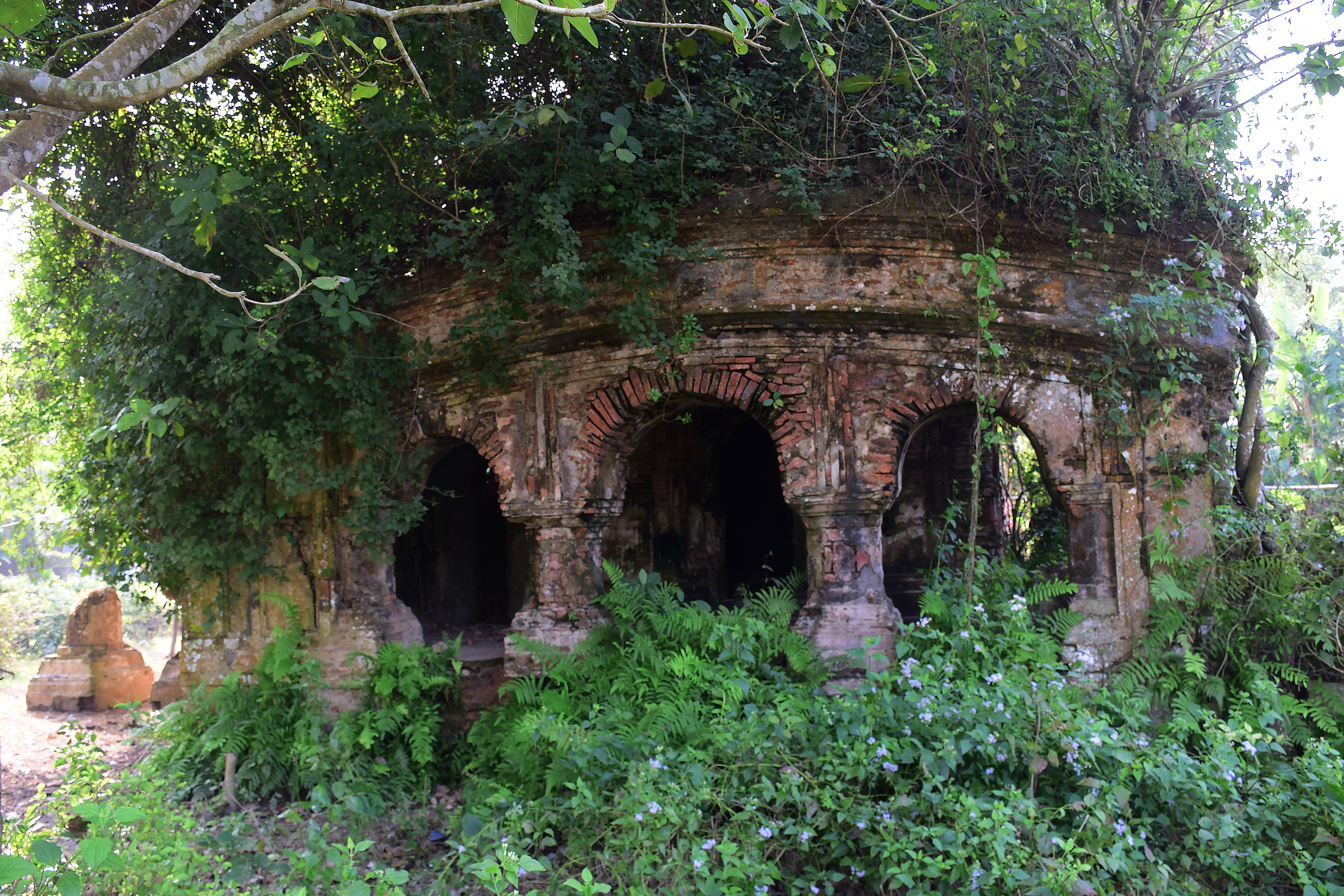
Radhaballbh Temple at a dilapidated state.

== Economy ==
During the British period, the estate of Turkagarh along with many other Zamindari Estates of Midnapore district, was a premier centre of sugarcane production. The crop was supplied from the farms in the estate of the Bardhaman Raj. In 1909, in the Calcutta Gazette, it was recorded that the Rajas had paid more than 8000 Rupee in land revenue.

== Family tree ==
Raja Krishnadas Singha Gajendra Mahapatra
  - Lalbihari Singha Gajendra Mahapatra
  - Nalbihari Singha Gajendra Mahapatra
    - Raja Govindaballabh Singha Gajendra Mohapatra
      - Raja Makaranda Singha
        - Bijayram Singha Gajendra Mahapatra
          - Har Narayan Singha Gajendra Mahapatra
      - Kriparam Singha Gajendra Mahapatra
    - Raja Raj Ballabh Singha Gajendra Mahapatra
      - Raja Jashodananda Singha Gajendra Mahapatra
        - Deviprasanna Singha Gajendra Mahapatra
        - Raja Ganga Narayan Singha Gajendra Mahapatra
          - Raja Panchanan Singha Gajendra Mahapatra
            - Nilkantha Singha Gajendra Mahapatra
              - Kailashchandra Singha Gajendra Mahapatra
                - Jyotischandra Singha Gajendra Mahapatra
                  - Manasi Sasmal
                  - Amar Singha
                    - Gautam Singha
                    - Nirupama Gucchait
                  - Ranajit Singha
                    - Kausik Singha Gajendra Mahapatra
                      - Subhajit Singha Gajendra Mahapatra
                      - Atreyi
                      - Maitreyi
                    - Anupama Bera
                    - Madhurima Maity
                  - Ajit Singha
            - Komal Kamini Debi m. Kshetramohan Kanungo
              - Hemchandra Kanungo
            - Raja Kali Prasanna Singha Gajendra Mohapatra
            - Sivasabh Singha
              - Sarathchandra Singha
                - Prithvinath Singha
                  - Prabir Singha
                    - Raja Ajay Singha Gajendra Mohapatra
                    - Kalyan Singha
                    - Dilip Singha
                      - Subhajit Singha
                      - Debojit Singha
                      - Sudheshna Singha
                    - Pradip Singha
                  - Vijay Singha Gajendra Mahapatra
                  - Samar Singha
                - Pareshnath Singha
                  - Subir Singha
                    - Tarun Singha
                    - Arun Singha
                  - Surath Singha
                    - Ashok Singha
                    - Dipak Singha
                    - Alok Singha
                    - Keshav Singha
                    - Ajay Singha
                    - Madan Singha
                      - Trilochan Singha
                        - Hemchandra Singha
                          - Nani Singha
                          - Gunendra
                          - Nagen Singha
                          - Kanti Singha
                      - Fakir Singha
                        - Basanta Singha
                  - Sangram Singha
          - Ananda Singha Gajendra Mohapatra
          - Ram Narayan Singha
          - Laxmi Narayan Singha
          - Rup Narayan Singha
            - Madan Singha
            - Mathur Singha
              - Umaprasad Singha
                - Manmath Singha
                - Prafulla Singha
                - Priyo Singha
                - Girindra Singha
            - Shyamaprasad Singha
            - Durga Singha Gajendra Mahapatra
            - Shital
            - Bhabani
            - Tarini
        - Chandrasekhar Singha
        - Bikramananda Singha
        - Biswanath Singha
        - Kasinath Singha
      - Debakinandan Singha
        - Radhacharan Singha Gajendra Mahapatra
          - Madhusudan Singha
    - Pranballabh Singha

== Gallery ==
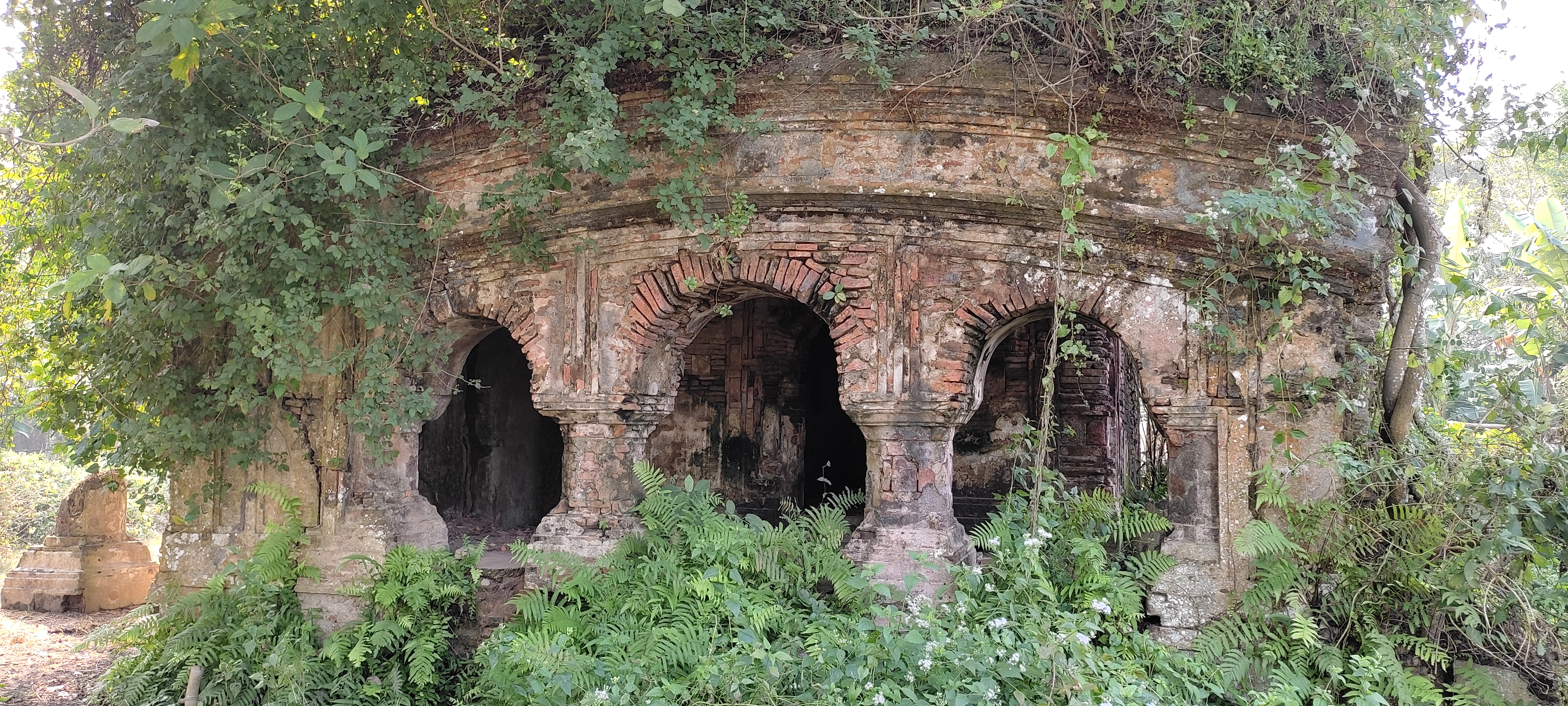
Radhaballabh Temple

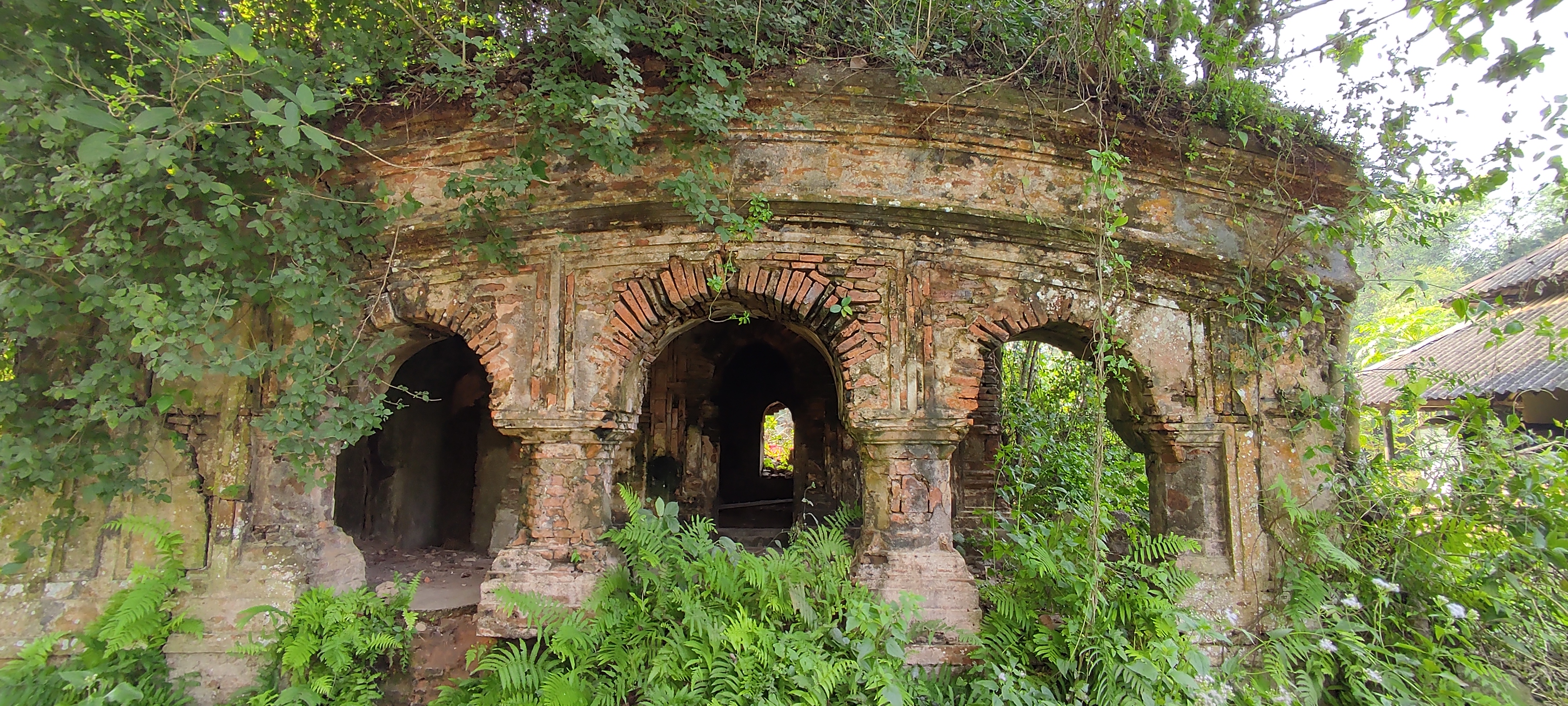
Now in dilapidated state

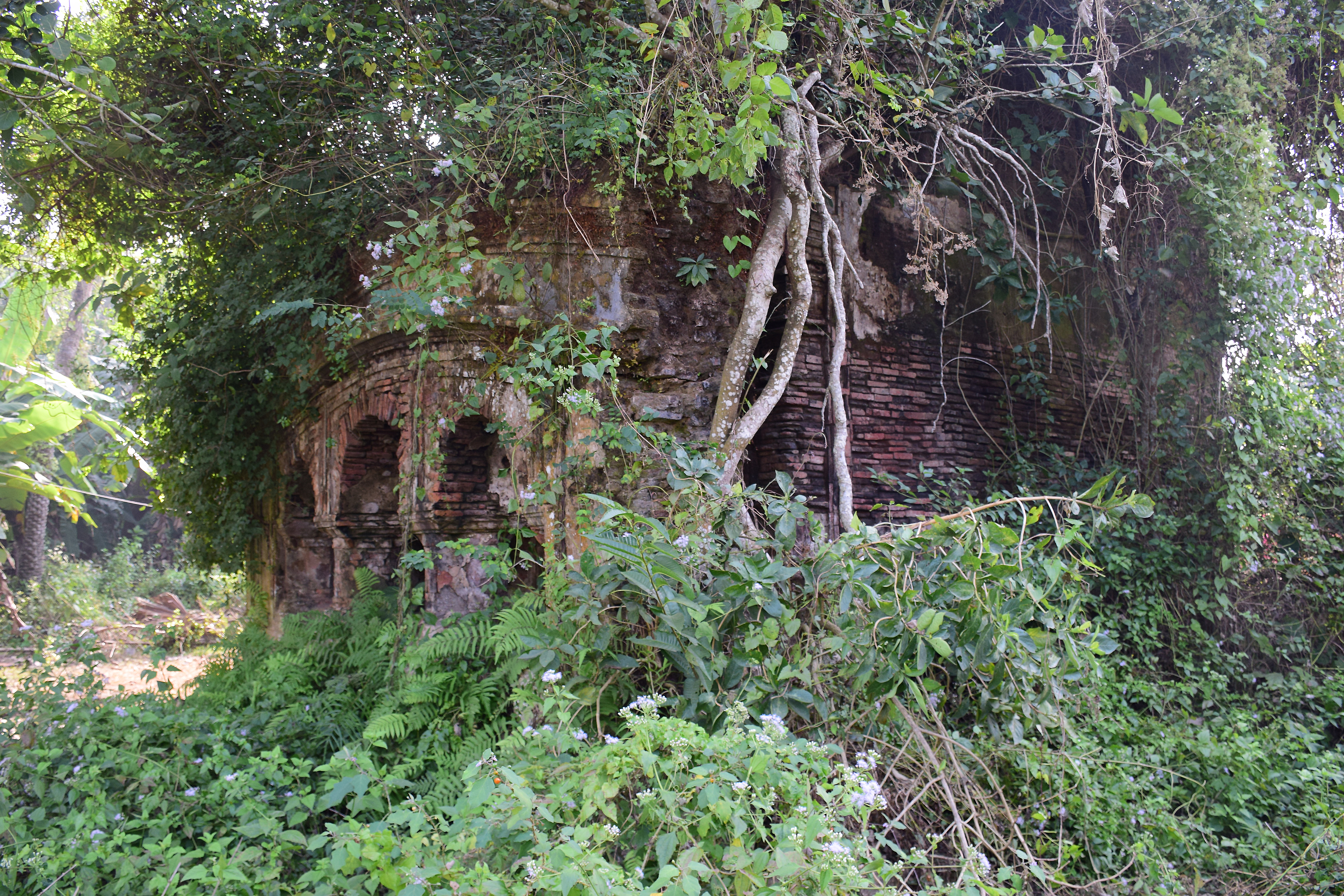
Side view

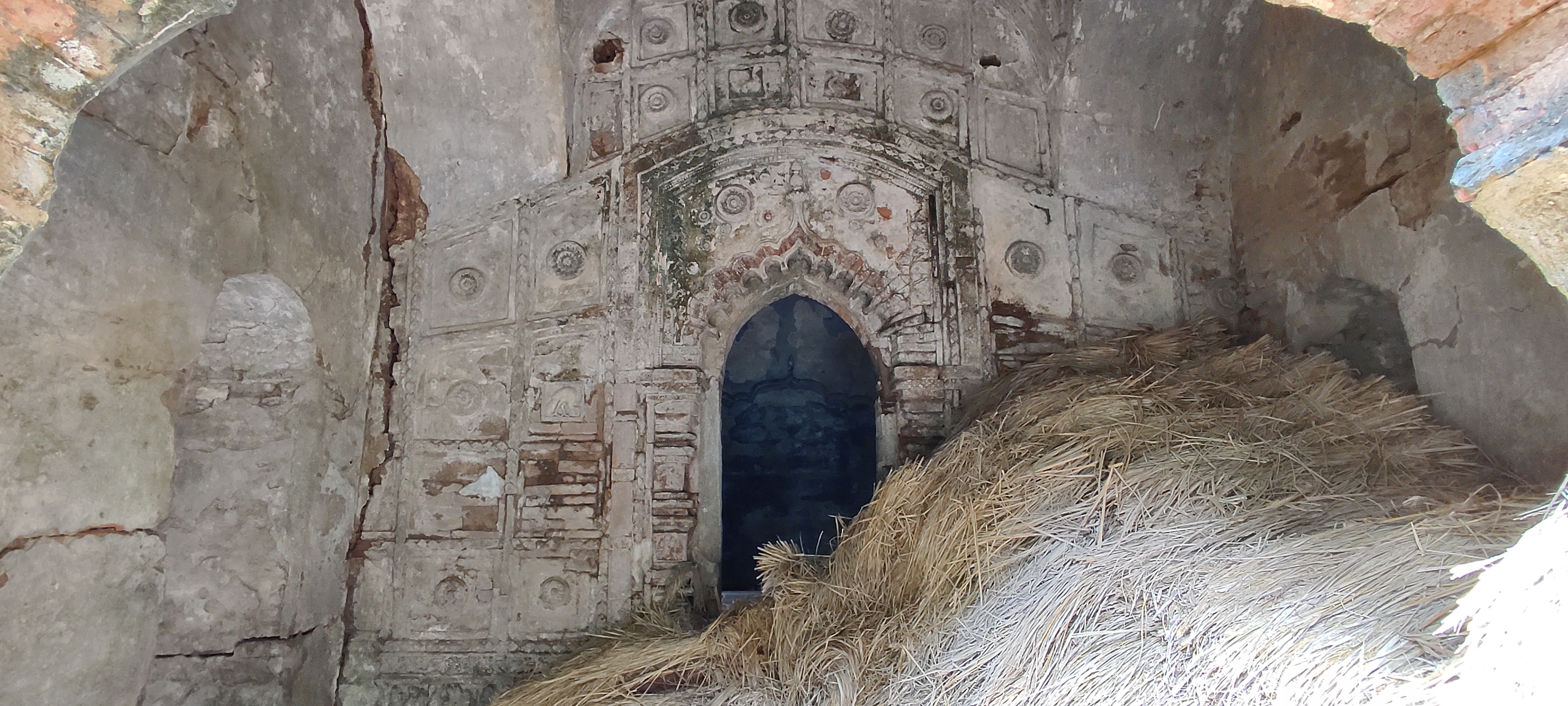
Built in Bengal temple architecture

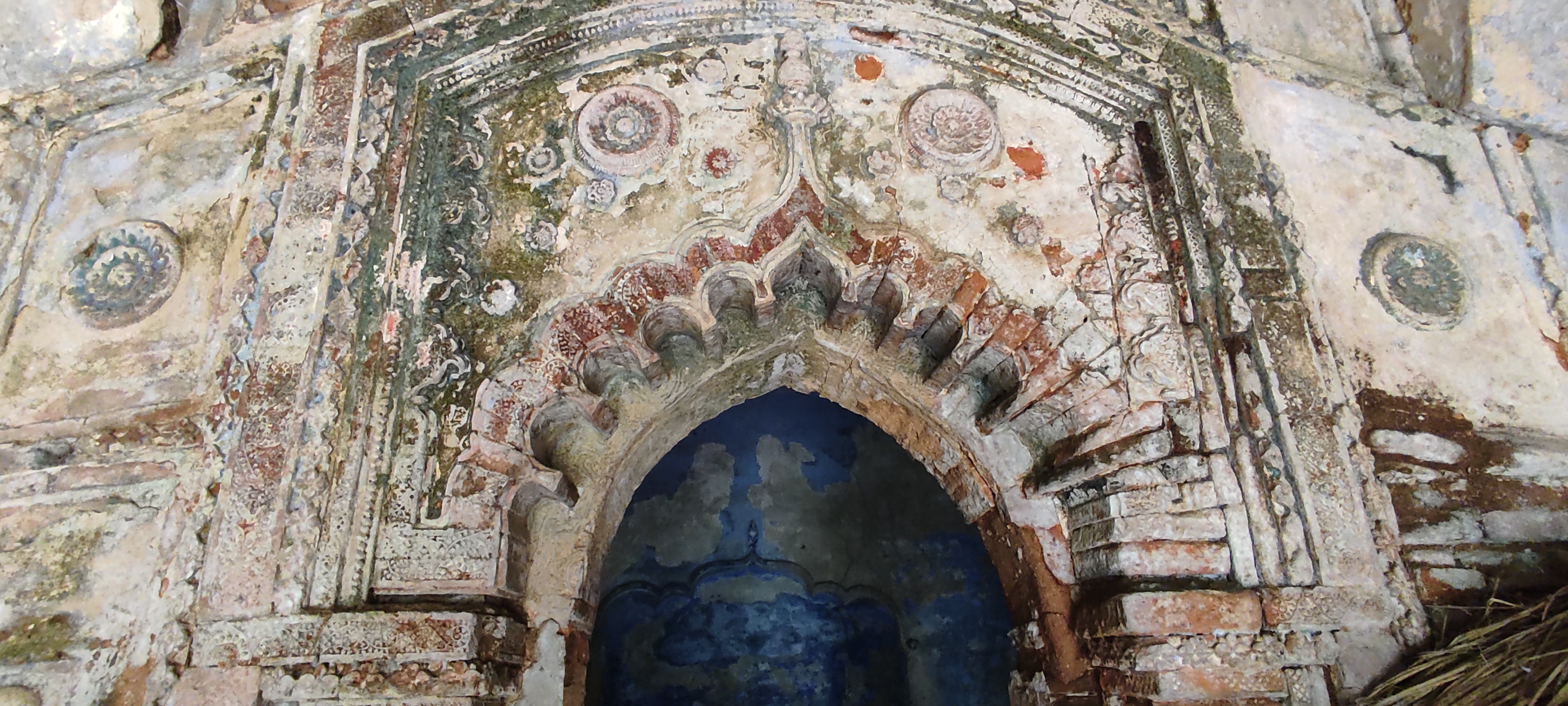
The entrance of the temple

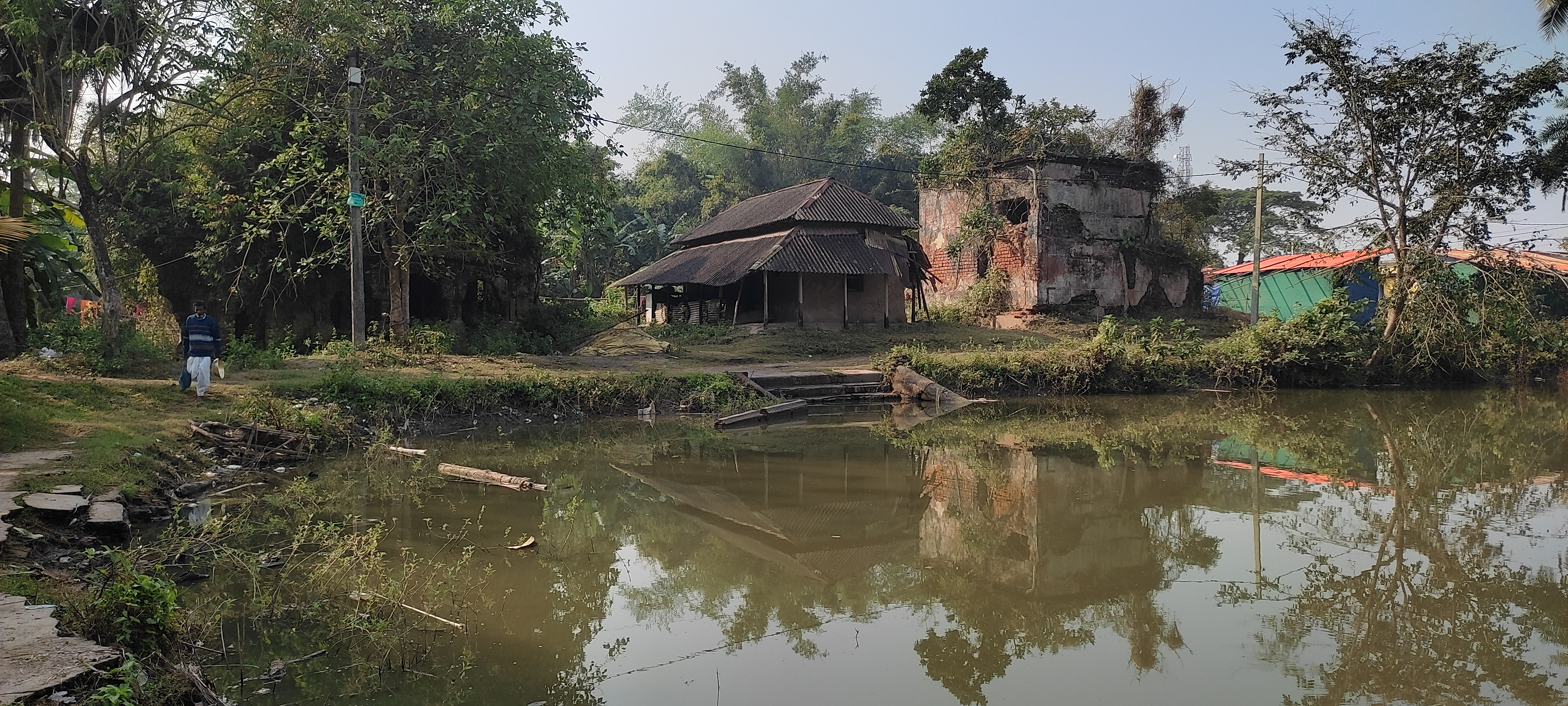
Outside view

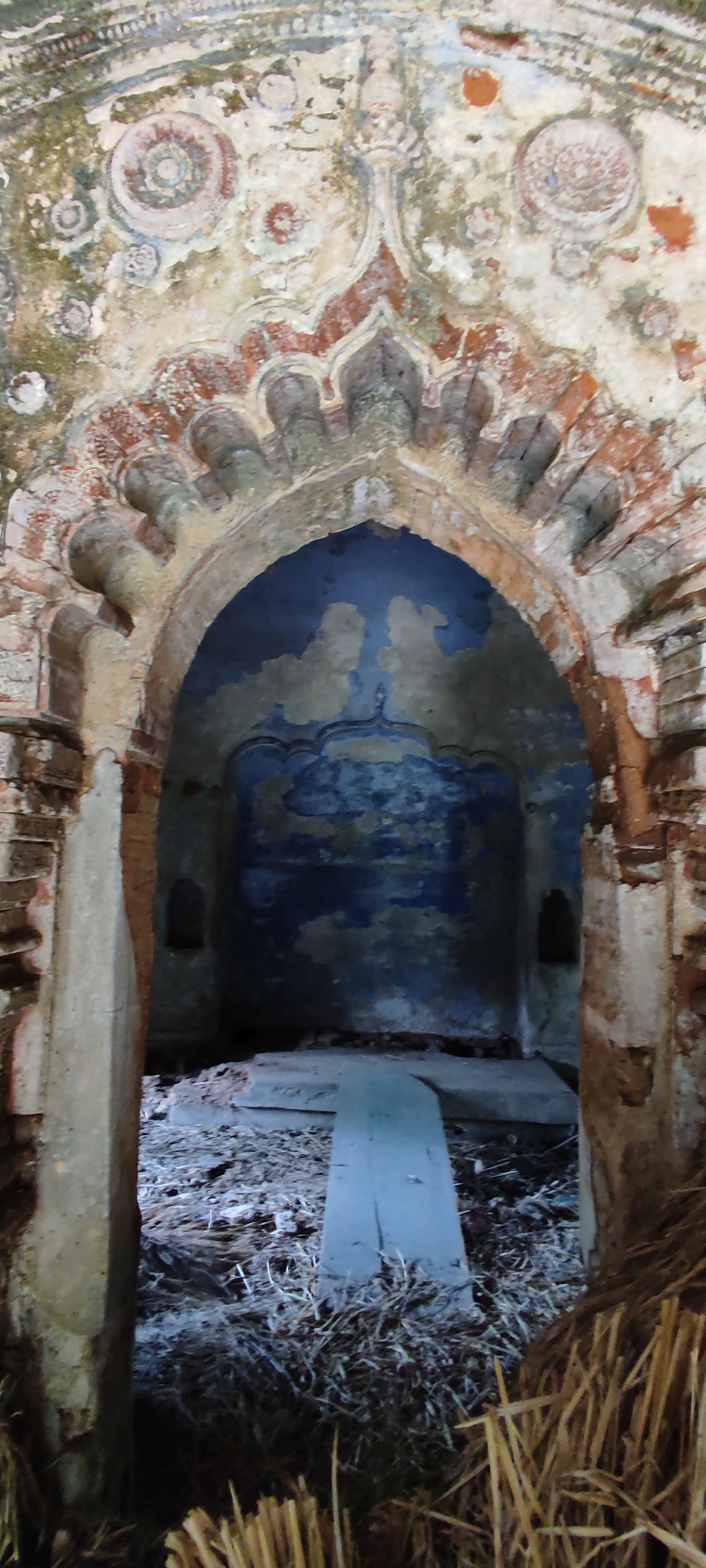
Inside view of Radhaballabh Temple

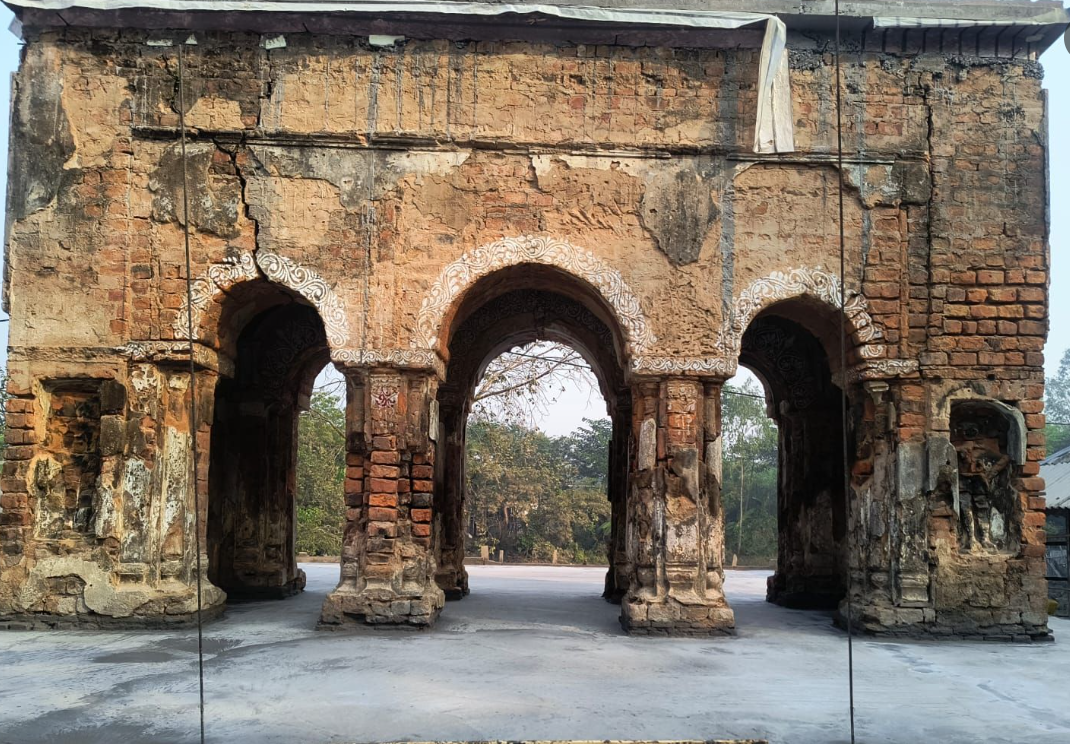
Durga Temple (Restoration in process)

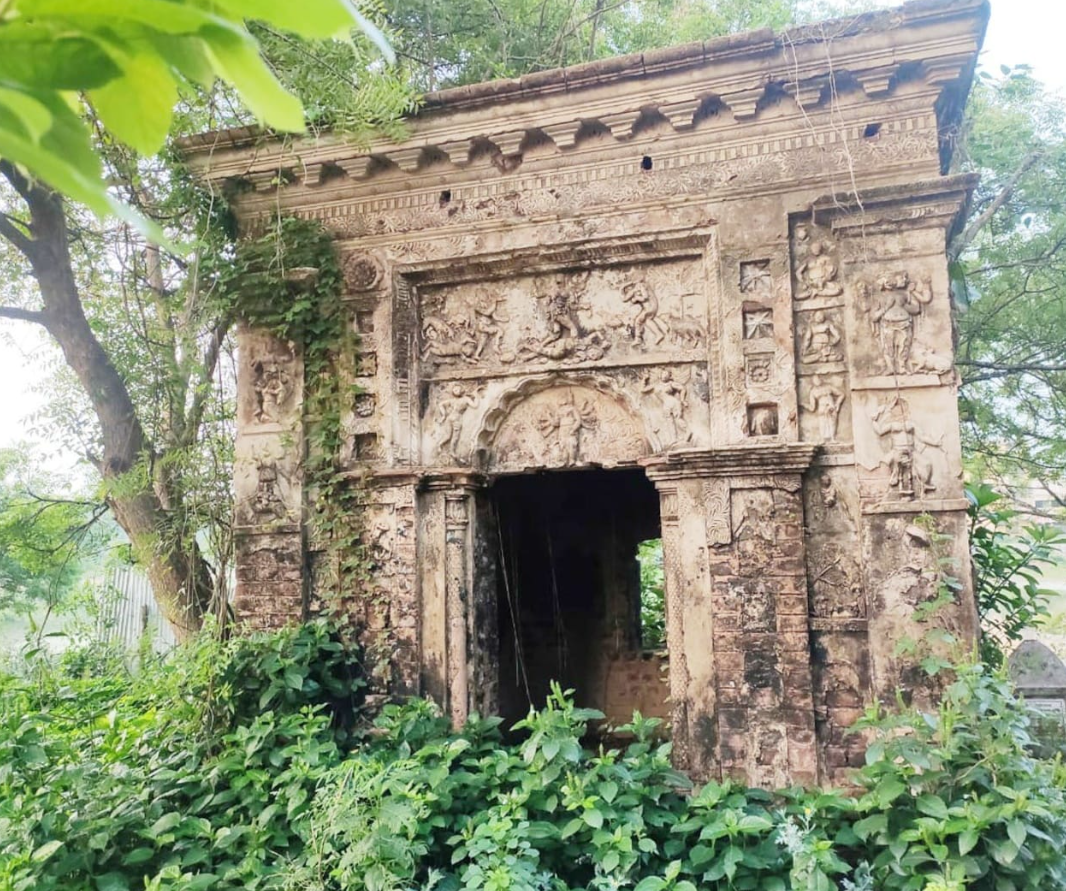
Kali Mandir

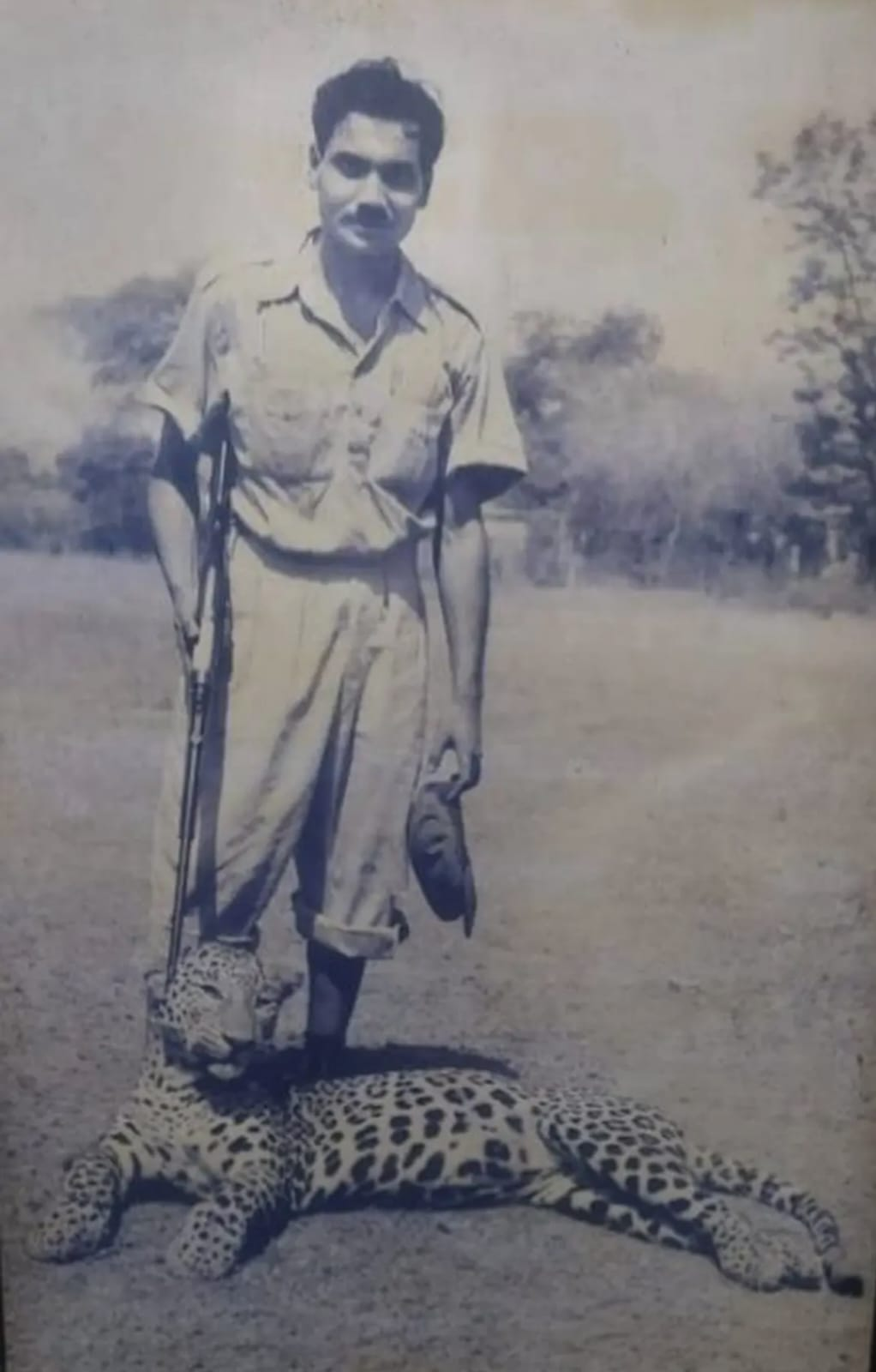
Raja Ajay Singha Gajendra Mahapatra

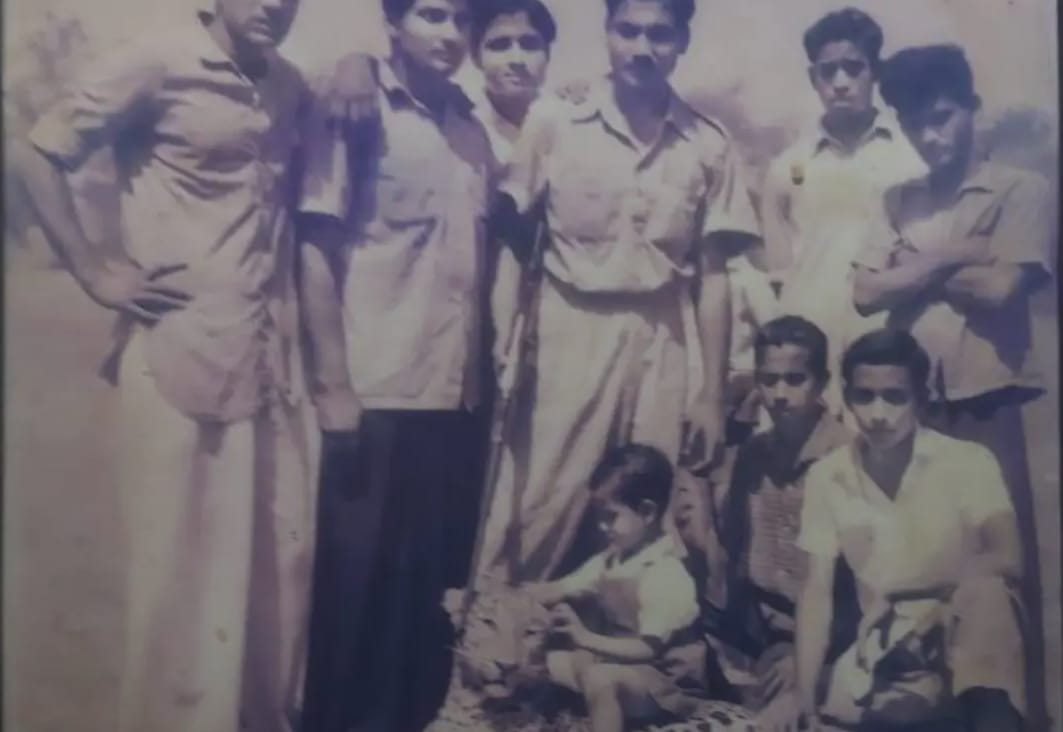
Rajkumar Ajay Singha

== See also ==
- Bahubalindra Royal Family
- Tamluk Royal Family
- Raja Haridas
- Hemchandra Kanungo
- Birkul Royal Family
