= Moynagarh Raj =

Indian dynasty of Kings from Bengal

Moynagarh Raj Family Moyna Raj
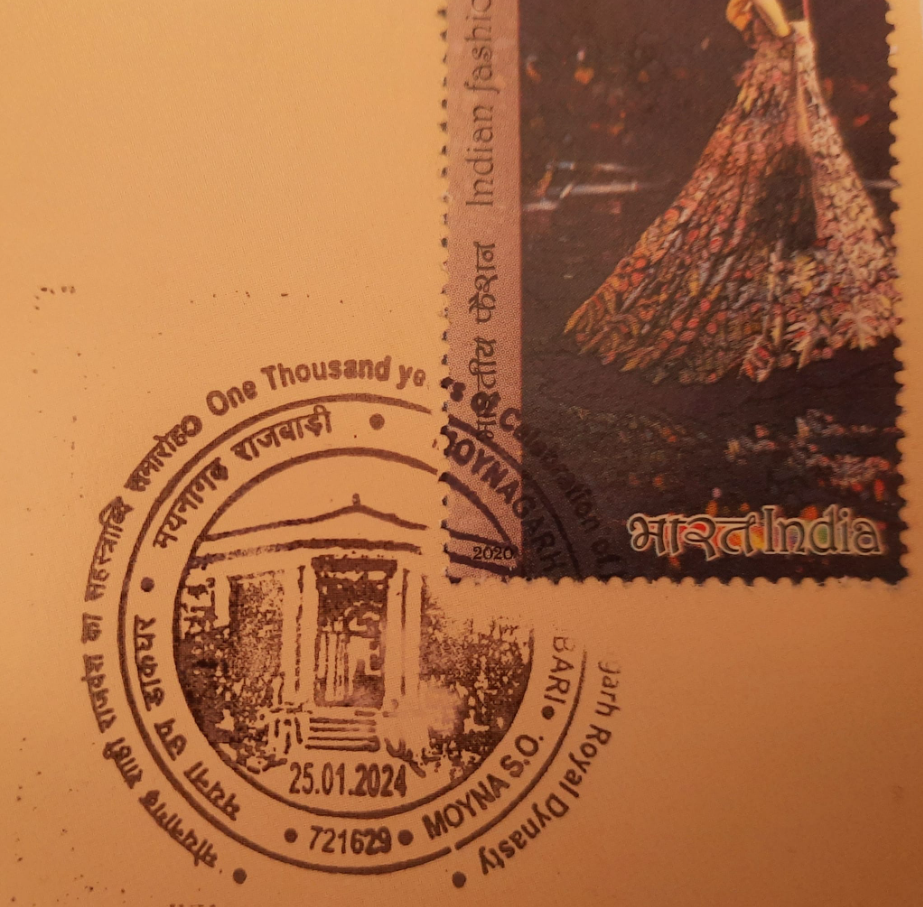
- Country: India
- Current region: Medinipur district, West Bengal
- Founder: Raja Govardhanananda Bahubalindra
- Historic seat: Balisitagarh, Sabang
- Titles: Raja, Samanta, Bhuiyan, Bahubalindra
- Connected members: Tamluk Raj, Turka Raj, Birkul Raj

The Bahubalindra Dynasty or the Moyna Raj Family is an ancient royal lineage based in the present-day Purba Medinipur district of West Bengal, belonging to the Mahishya caste. This royal family ruled the Jalauti Dandapat (the Gajapati Empire was divided into many Dandapats) as feudal vassal lords under the Gajapati Emperor Harichandan Mukundadeva.

== History ==
During the reign of Utkal King Gajapati Kapilendra Deva in 1467, Kalindiram Samanta one of the king's prominent generals was appointed as the Samanta of Balisitagarh, located near Keleghai River. One descendant of Kalindiram, Govardhan Samanta was appointed as Samanta Raja under the Gajapati ruler Mukundadeva. When a pirate Sridhar Hui's activities worsened with the support of foreign traders, King Mukundadeva sent Govardhan. Tasked with confronting and defeating the tyrannical pirate, Govardhana's successful campaign led the Gajapati King to established him as the feudal King of Moynagarh (Moynachoura).

== Rise as an independent Kingdom ==
After Govardhan got the control of Moyanagarh, he stopped paying tribute to the Harichandan Mukunda deva, which led to an attack on Moynagarh by the King and his soldiers. Despite being outnumbered, Gobardhanan fought valiantly but was captured in the end. In a surprising turn of events, Gobardhanan managed to control a maddened elephant in the court of the Gajapati King which no other warrior seemed to be capable off. This act of bravery, combined with his melodious voice, reached Gajapati Raja Mukundadeva's ears. Disguised, the king visited Gobardhan in prison, mesmerized by his songs. Impressed by his bravery and character, the king freed Gobardhan and gave him the title of Bahubalindra (the one with extreme strength), making him an independent ruler with control over Moynagarh and its surroundings by 1562. Consequently, after the advent of the Mughal Empire, in Bengal, the dynasty was recognised by the Mughal emperor, Jahangir as an independent royal family of Bengal.

== Reconstruction of Moynagarh fort ==
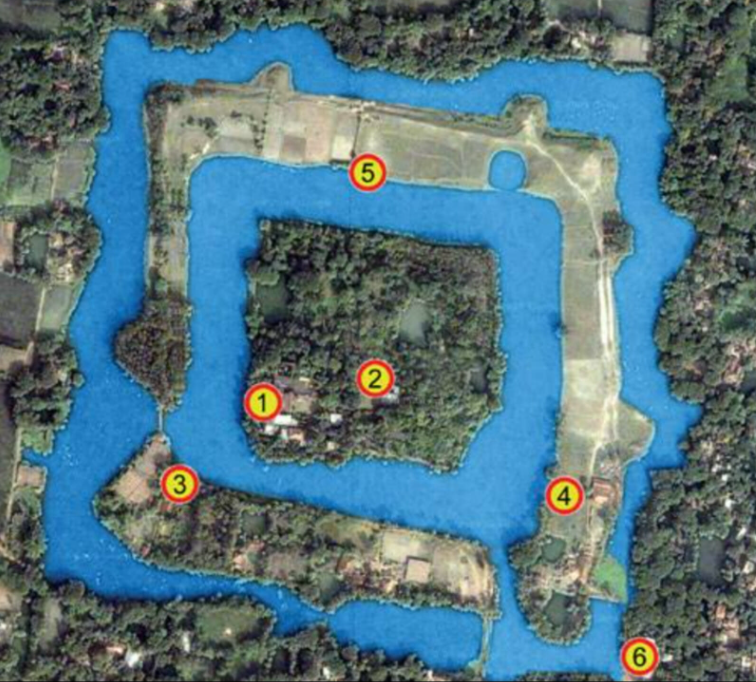
Moynagarh Fort

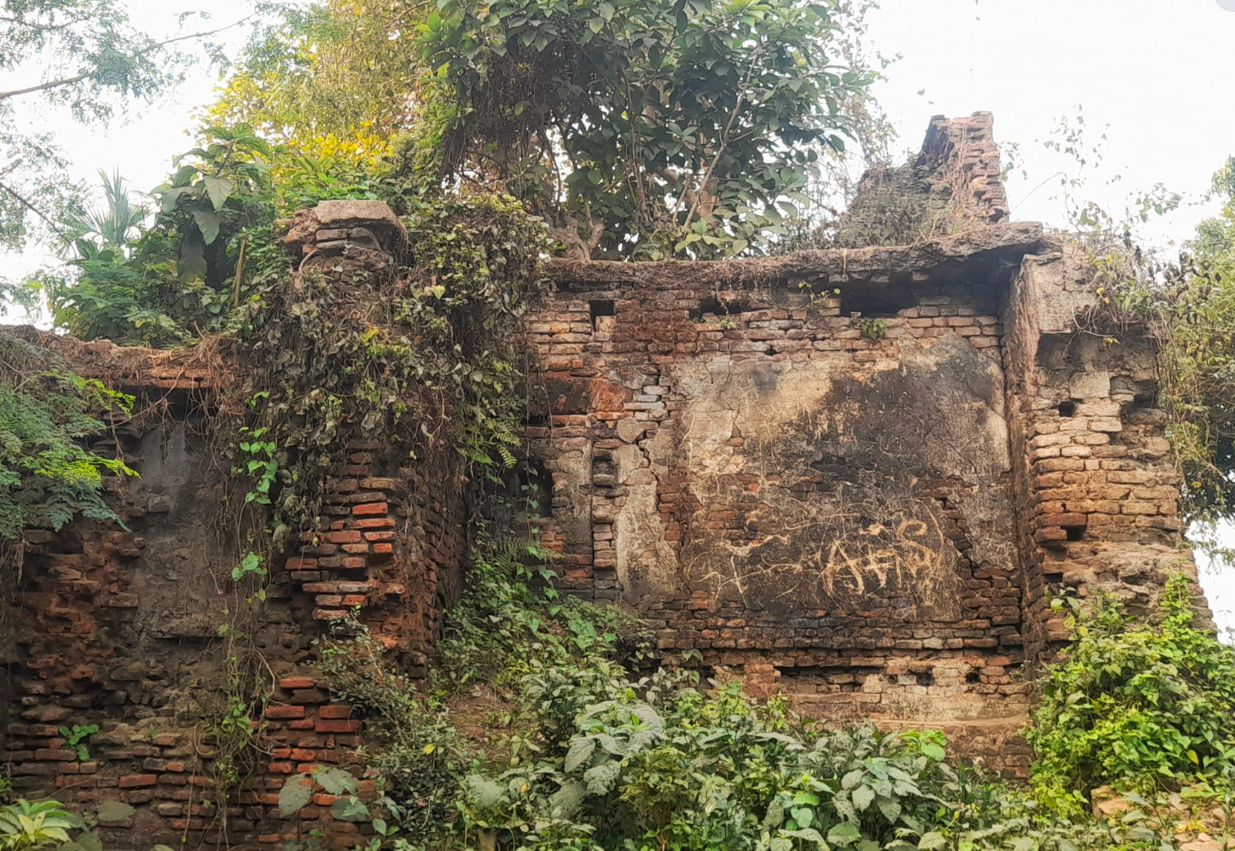
Destroyed fort

As an independent king of Moynagarh, Govardhanananda Bahubalindra took significant steps to protect his kingdom and fort from foreign invasions. To fortify his fort and kingdom, he constructed two square moats, Kalidaha and Makardaha, and filled the Makardaha moat with crocodiles to prevent enemy forces from reaching the fort. Additionally, he connected the surrounding bamboo groves in a way that rendered enemy arrows ineffective. These strategic moves ensured the fort's security and its invincibility, especially during Bargis raids and other subsequent invasions.

== Consolidation ==
After the establishment of the new stronghold of Moynagarh by Raja Gobardhanananda, the new Kingdom had to wage wars with numerous neighbouring Kingdoms such as the Tamluk Raj, Birkul Raj and Kajlagarh Raj which it managed to win and thus evolved into a formidable force in the Medinipur region. It also resisted multiple invasions at times by different Sultans of Bengal. The Royal family also provided incentive to their caste fellows, many Mahishya families to settle across their Kingdom. Their historical resettlement today makes up the current inhabitants of Moyna.

== Conflict with the East India Company ==
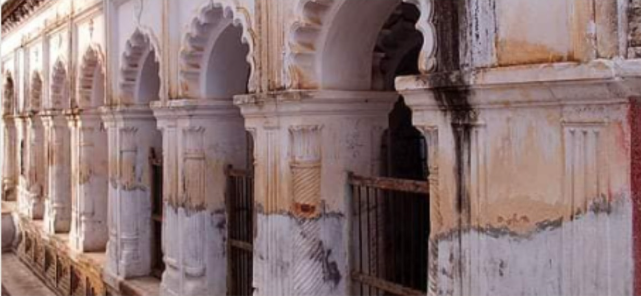
A part of their Palace

During the Mughal rule, the Bahubalindra Kings ruled on their initial independent mandate. Due to a conflict with the East India Company, they first lost their sovereignty. During Mughal Emperor Jahangir's reign, the then King, Parmananda was honored with a royal insignia and a panja (royal seal). The Royal Family later faced challenges from the British East India Company under the instructions of the Governor General Warren Hastings, which attacked the fort in response to the family's refusal to pay taxes. However British company failed to capture the King due to the fort's secret chamber, which was unreachable, the siege lasted for almost three days, during the reign of Raja Jagadananda Bahubalindra, but still the walls couldn't be breached, at the end a truce was reached between the troops of Warren Hastings and the Raja.

== Notable members ==
- KALINDIRAM SAMANTA: He was a Samanta serving under the Eastern Ganga dynasty. A Mahishya by caste, he governed Sabang dandapat from his Fort, Balisitagarh. His efficiency as a Governor and prominency as a military leader was noticed by the Eastern Ganga Emperor Kapilendra Deva, who promoted him to the rank of Senapati or the Chief military officer.
- GOBARDHANANDA BAHUBALINDRA: He was the sixth generation descendant of Kalindiram. Born as Gobardhan Samanta, he received the honorary title of "Bahubalindra" (one with extreme strength) and "Ananda" from the Utkala king as a token of gratitude for his successful campaign against a pirate lord named Sridhar Hui who refused to pay yearly tributes to the Utkal King. After the first completion of his campaign, he became the first independent Raja of Moynagarh.
- PARAMANANDA BAHUBALINDRA: He succeeded his father Raja Gobardhanananda to the throne of Moynagarh. He was a benevolent and a kind ruler. He solidified the dynasty's control over the newly gained villages. He was called to the Mughal capital of Agra and was formally recognised by Emperor Jahangir.
- JAGADANANDA BAHUBALINDRA: He was the Raja of Moynagarh, during the time coinciding with the advent of the rule of the East India Company. The Governor General of India had demanded excess taxes as a tribute from the king. Which he refused to give. As a result, Warren Hastings had sent a battalion of troops in 20th February, 1773. After a siege of three days, the troops had to retreat and return to Calcutta.

== Genealogy ==
Sl no.	Name of the king	Timeline (AD)
1.	Kalindiram Samanta (Samanta of Gajapati Emperor Kapilendra deva and the ruler of Jalauti Dandapat/ He is the ruler of Balisitagarh)	1434-1467
2.	Dharanidhar Samanta	
3.	Baishnav Charan Samanta	
4.	Chaitanya Charan Samanta	
5.	Nandiram Samanta	
6.	Raja Govardhananda Samanta / Raja Govardhananda Bahubalindra (Mukundadeva declared him as the first independent King of Moynagarh)	1561-1607
7.	Paramananda Bahubalindra	1607-1672
8.	Madhavananda Bahubalindra	1672-1719
9.	Gokulananda Bahubalindra	1719-1742
10.	Kripananda Bahubalindra	1742-1770
11.	Jagadananda Bahubalindra	1770-1783
12.	Brajananda Bahubalindra	1783-1793
13.	Anandananda Bahubalindra	1793-1822
14.	Radhashyamananda Bahubalindra (He broke the one child policy of the royal family, he had four sons: Purnanada Bahubalindra, Yadavananda Bahubalindra, Sacchidananda Bahubalindra and Premananda Bahubalindra)	1822-1883
15.	Purnananda Bahubalindra	1883
16.	Herembananda Bahubalindra	

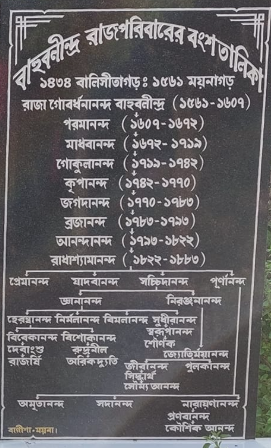
Bahubalindra royals

== Gallery ==
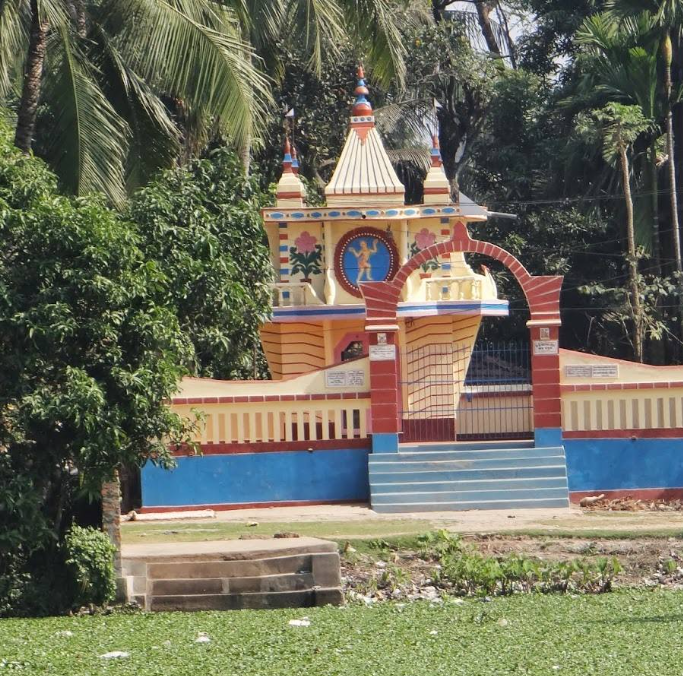
Rash Temple Moynagarh
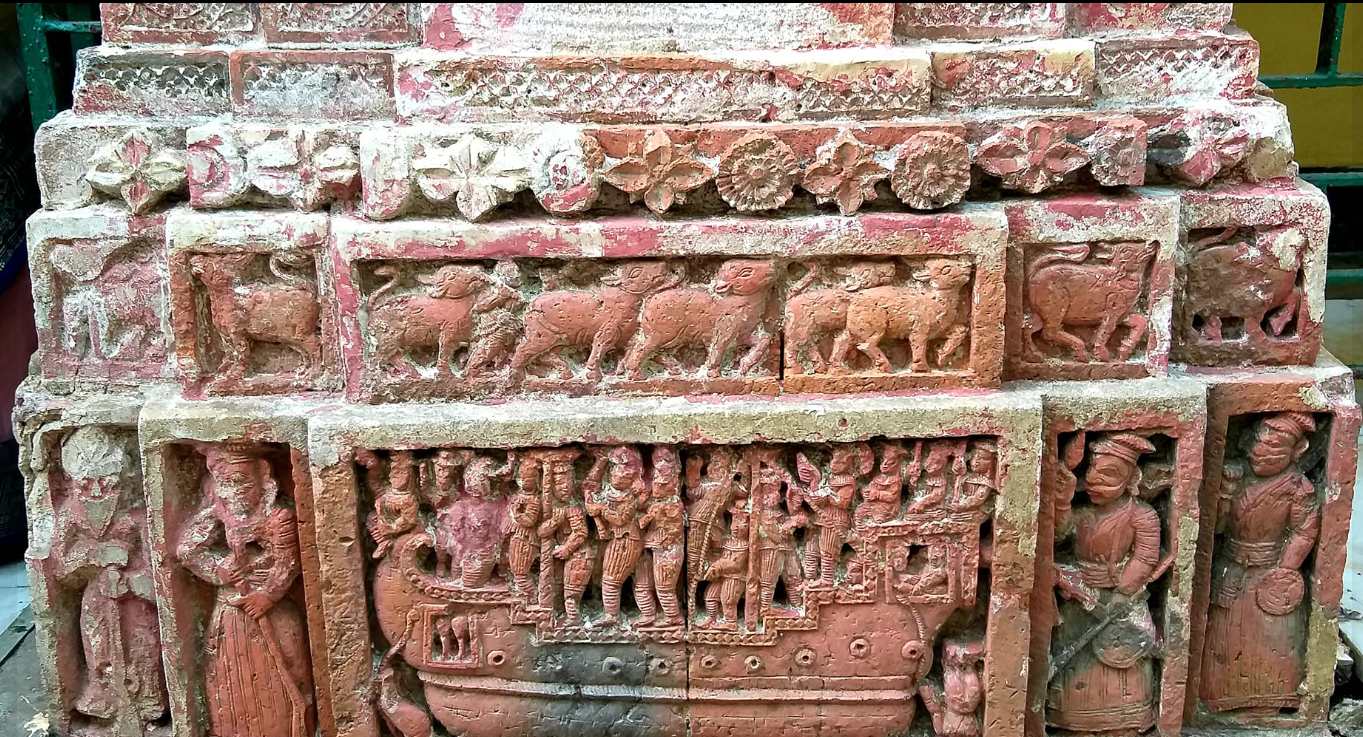
Poramati Chittra

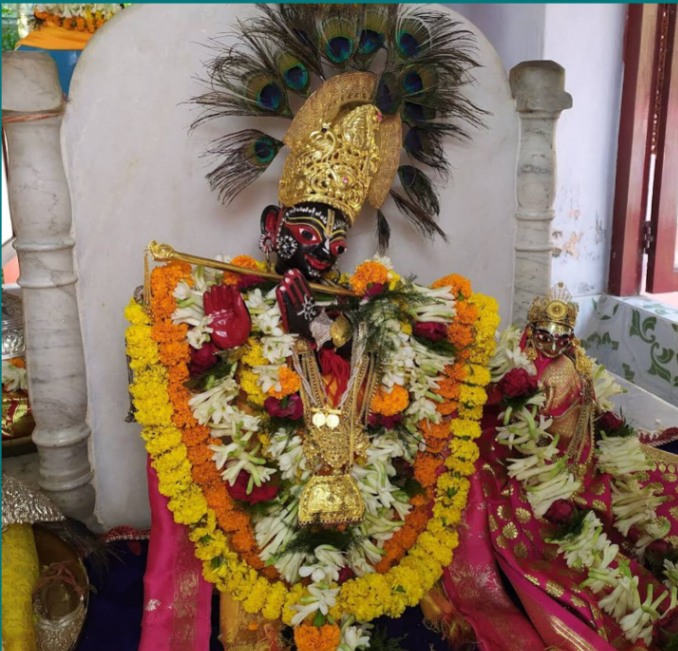
Shyam Shundar Jiu, the family's Kuldevta

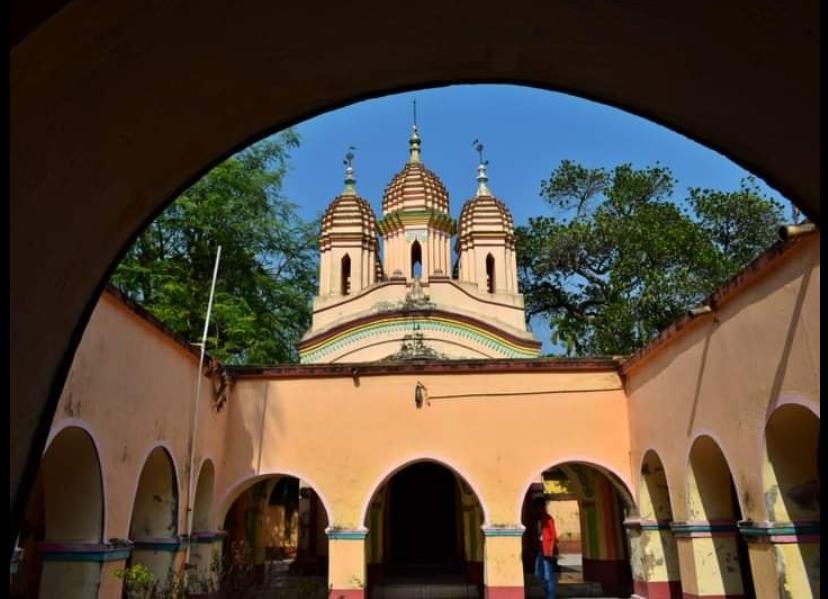
Radha Krishna Temple

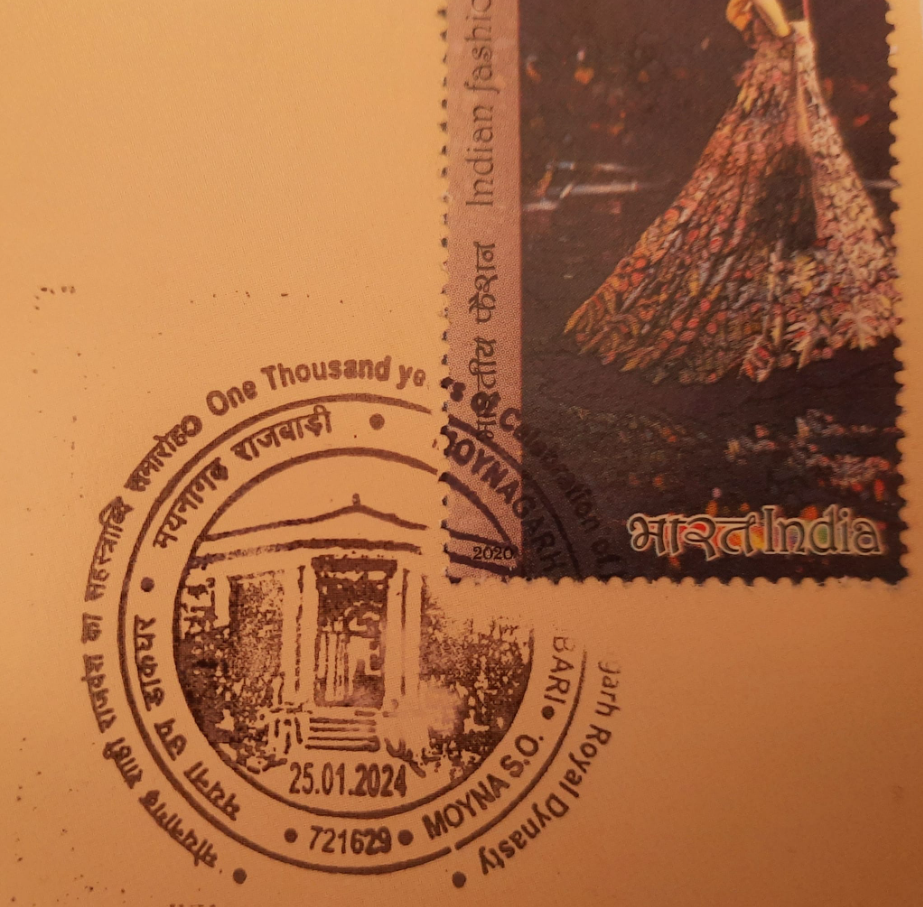
Stamp of Moynagarh

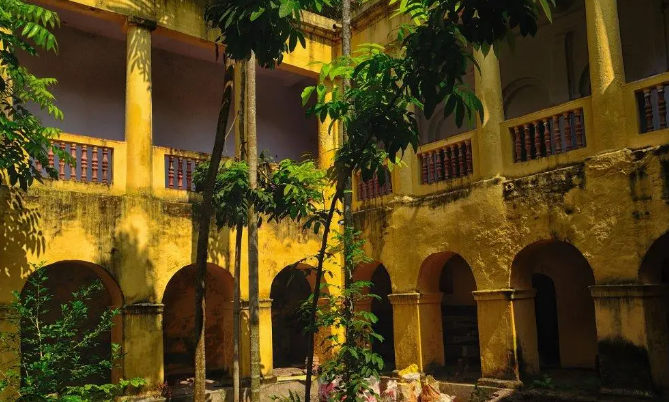
Royal Palace
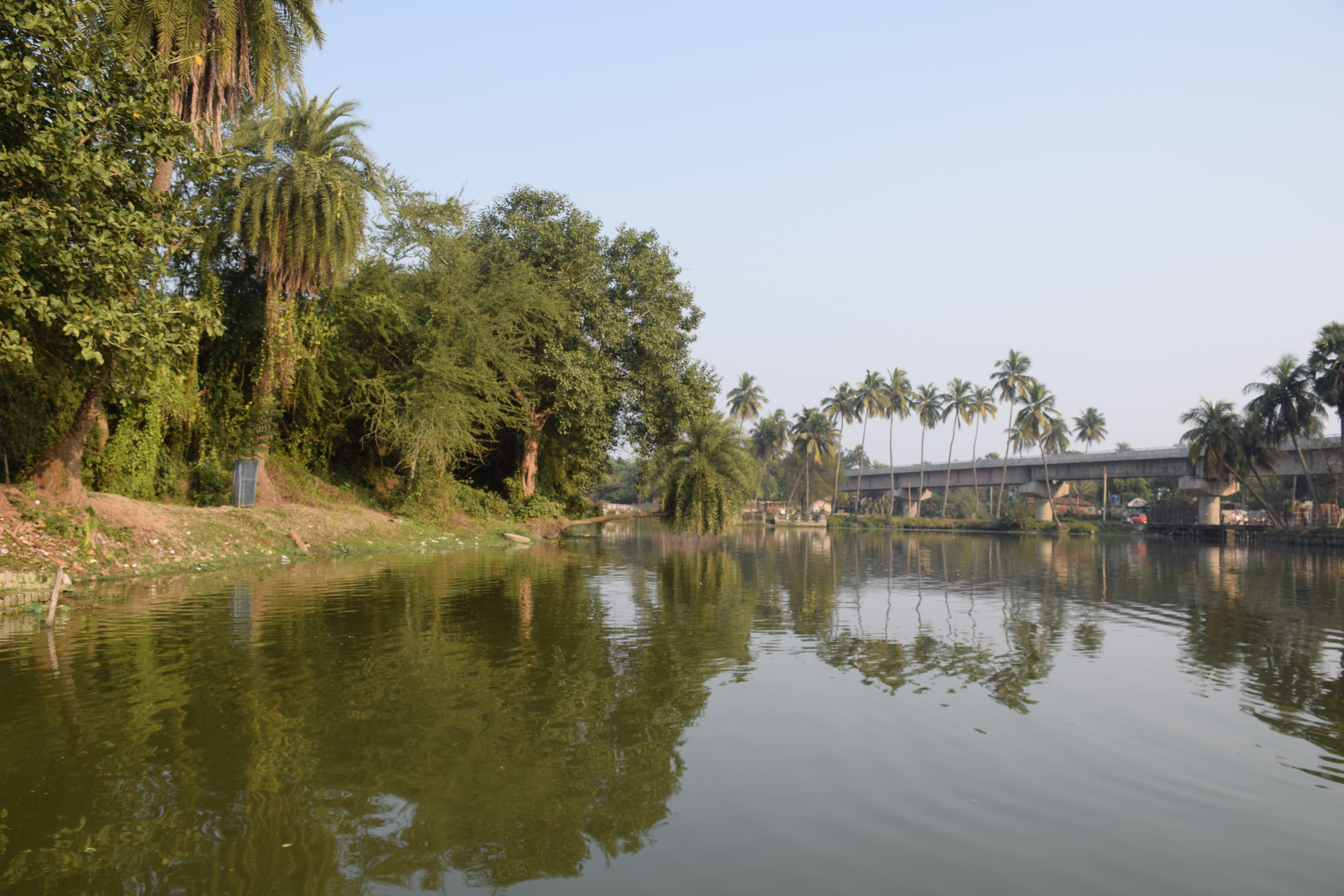
Moyna Garh

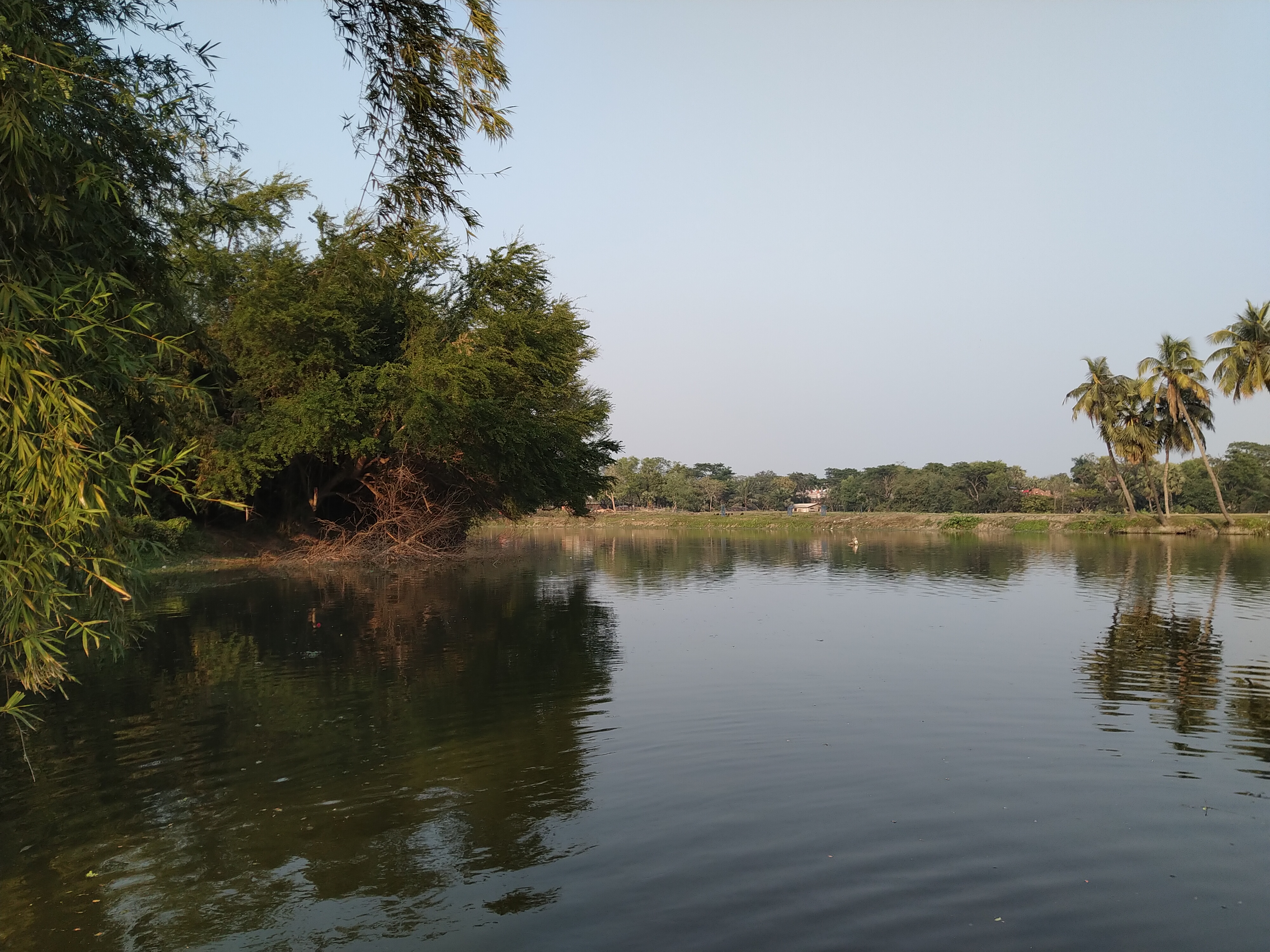
The surrounding Moat, which was said to have been inhabited by a huge serpent, protecting the Royal Family

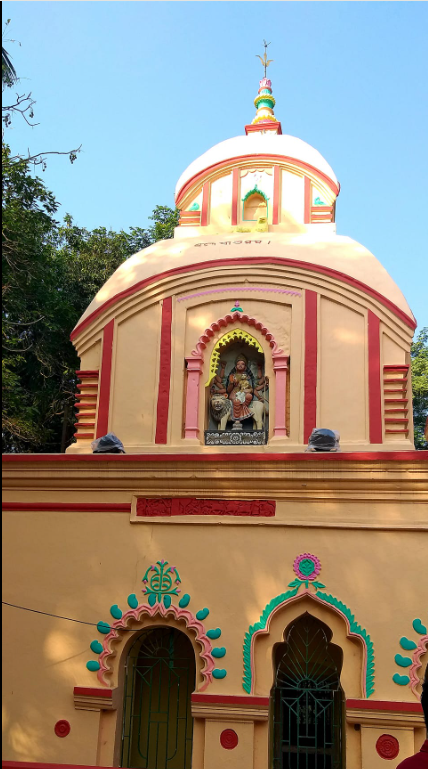
Lokeshwar Shiva Temple

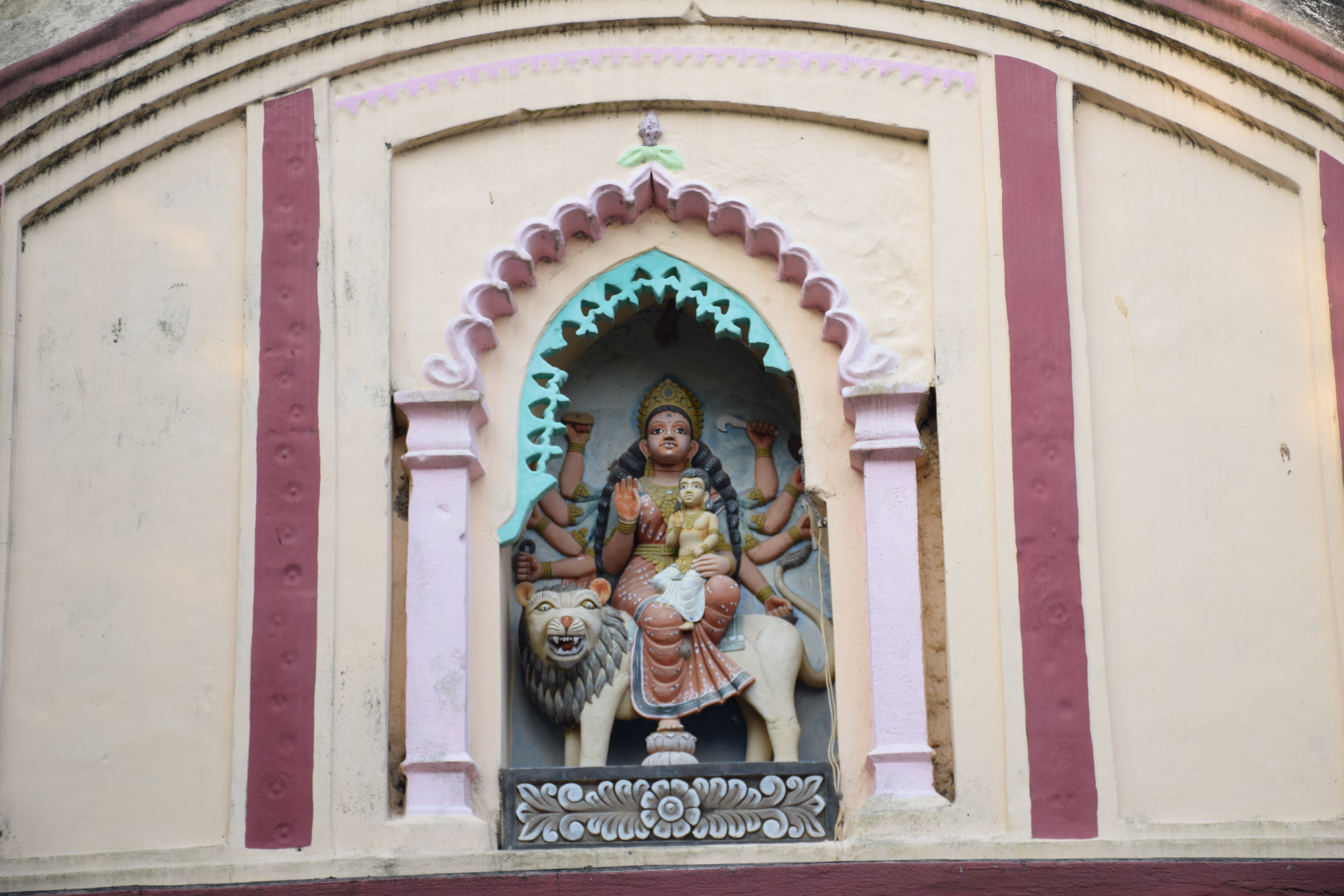
Terracotta works

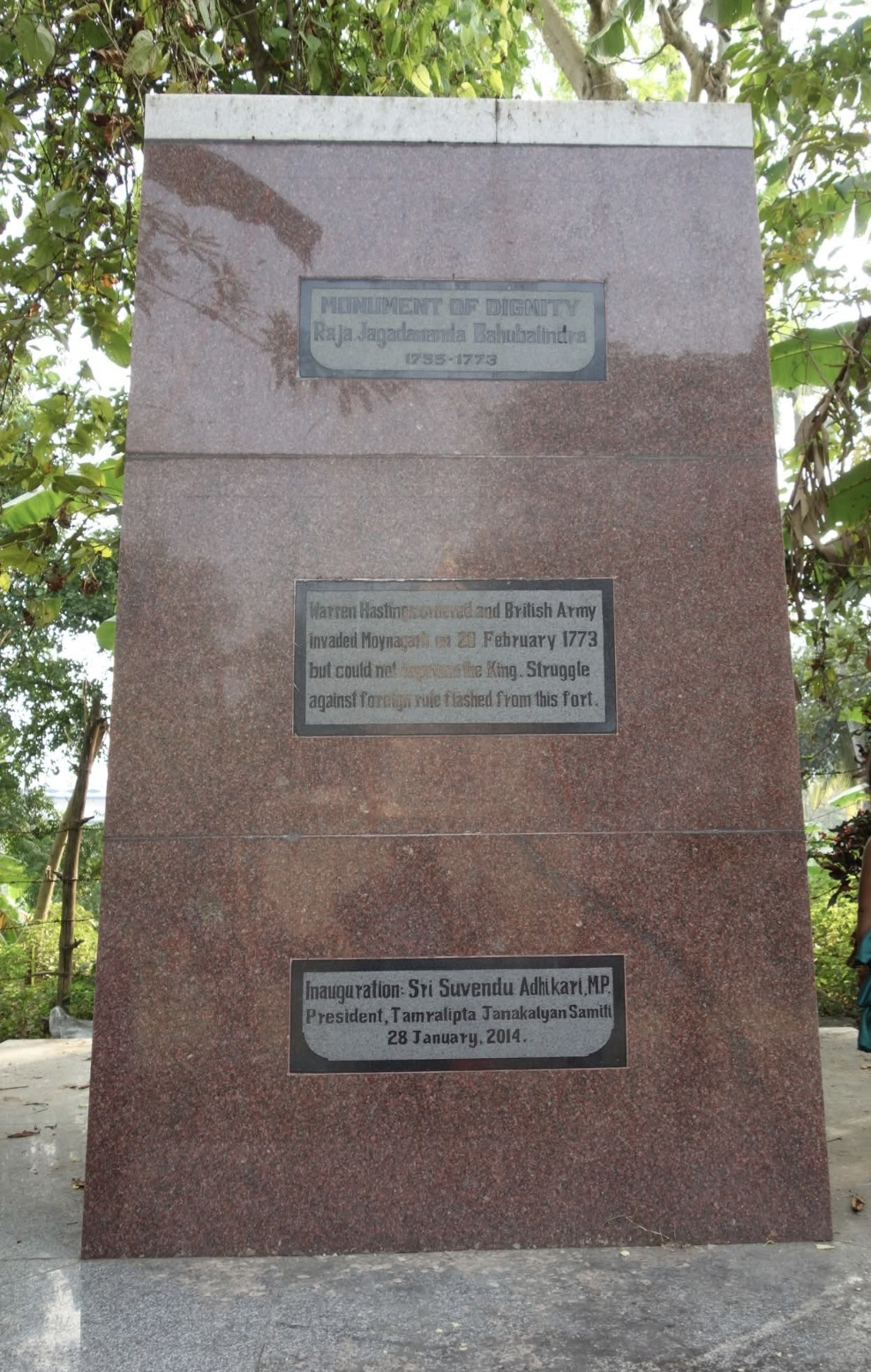
Monument of Honour at Moynagarh, built in the honour of Raja Jagadananda Bahubalindra's defence of the Fort from the troops of the East India Company sent by Warren Hastings

== See also ==
- Turkagarh Royal Family
- Raja Haridas
- Tamluk Royal Family
