= Moyna, Purba Medinipur =

Moyna
- Village
- Location in West Bengal, India Moyna (India)
- Coordinates: 22°14′00.0″N 87°47′00.0″E
- Country: India
- State: West Bengal
- District: East Midnapore

Population (2011)
  - Total: 3,695

Languages
  - Official: Bengali
- Time zone: UTC+5:30 (IST)
- Lok Sabha constituency: Tamluk
- Vidhan Sabha constituency: Moyna
- Website: eastmidnapore.gov.in

Moyna is a village in Moyna CD block in the Tamluk subdivision of the East Midnapore district in the Indian state of West Bengal.

== History ==
According to Binoy Ghosh, the ancient or even the medieval history of Moyna or Moynagarh is mired in controversy and uncertainties. Some enthusiasts of local history believe that Moyna was the birth-place and capital of Lau Sen. The question that comes up in this regard is that Lau Sen's existence is yet to be established historically. He remains a mythical king. Similarly, there are various complications about the origin of the name. Setting aside these controversies, we can take up certain points from comparatively more recent history.

In the 15th century, during the Islamic rule, Gobardhanananda Samanta, a Mahishya chieftain, founded the Moyna raj family. He was a sixth generation descendant of Kalindiram Samanta, who was a feudal chief of Bhanu Deva of Eastern Ganga dynasty. He was the commander of the stronghold of Balisita in Sabang.

During the rule of Govardhananda there was a dacoit named Sridhar Hui, with a Robin Hood image. The Utkal king could not collect any rent from Sri Dhar, and Gobardhanananda Samanta also failed to pay his rent on time. He was imprisoned by the Utkal king but Gobardhanananda Samanta's passion for music charmed him and he was released with due honours. He ultimately succeeded in eliminating Sridhar. Consequently, his descendants ruled the kingdom with the royal title of "Bahubalindra", granted to them by the Utkal kings.

Chandrabhanu, the great grandson of Govardhananda was initiated into the Gaudiya vaishnav faith by Rasikananda of the Gopiballavpur Goswami family.

== Geography ==
Cities and towns in Tamluk subdivision of East Midnapore district
M: municipal city/ town, CT: census town, R: rural/ urban centre, H: historical/ religious centre
Owing to space constraints in the small map, the actual locations in a larger map may vary slightly

=== Physical geography ===
The Keleghai flows on the south of Moyna. On the north flows the Kasai, Baksui and Panchtui. In the olden days, many of these rivers joined and flew into the sea, which was not very far off from the port city of Tamluk. Sabang is in the west and Tamluk is on the east. The area had come up from the sea and was called ‘Moynachar’. During the rule of the Utkal Raj, it was called a ‘chaura’ or island-like area.

=== Police station ===
Moyna police station has jurisdiction over Moyna CD block. Moyna police station covers an area of 147 km^{2} with a population of 196,903. It is located in Anandapur Mouza.

=== CD block HQ ===
The headquarters of this CD block are located at South Moyna.

=== Urbanisation ===
94.08% of the population of Tamluk subdivision live in the rural areas. Only 5.92% of the population live in the urban areas, and that is the second lowest proportion of urban population amongst the four subdivisions in East Midnapore district, just above Egra subdivision.

Note: The map alongside presents some of the notable locations in the subdivision. All places marked in the map are linked in the larger full screen map.

== Demographics ==
As per 2011 Census of India South Moyna had a total population of 3,695 of which 1,971 (53%) were males and 1,724 (47%) were females. Population below 6 years was 319. The total number of literates in South Moyna was 3,062 (90.70% of the population over 6 years).

== Healthcare ==
Gar Moyna Block Primary Health Centre, PO Moyna (with 15 beds) is the main medical facility in Moyna CD block. There are primary health centres at Ramchandrapur (with 2 beds) and Arangkianara (with 10 beds).

== Moyna picture gallery ==
=== Moynagarh Island ===
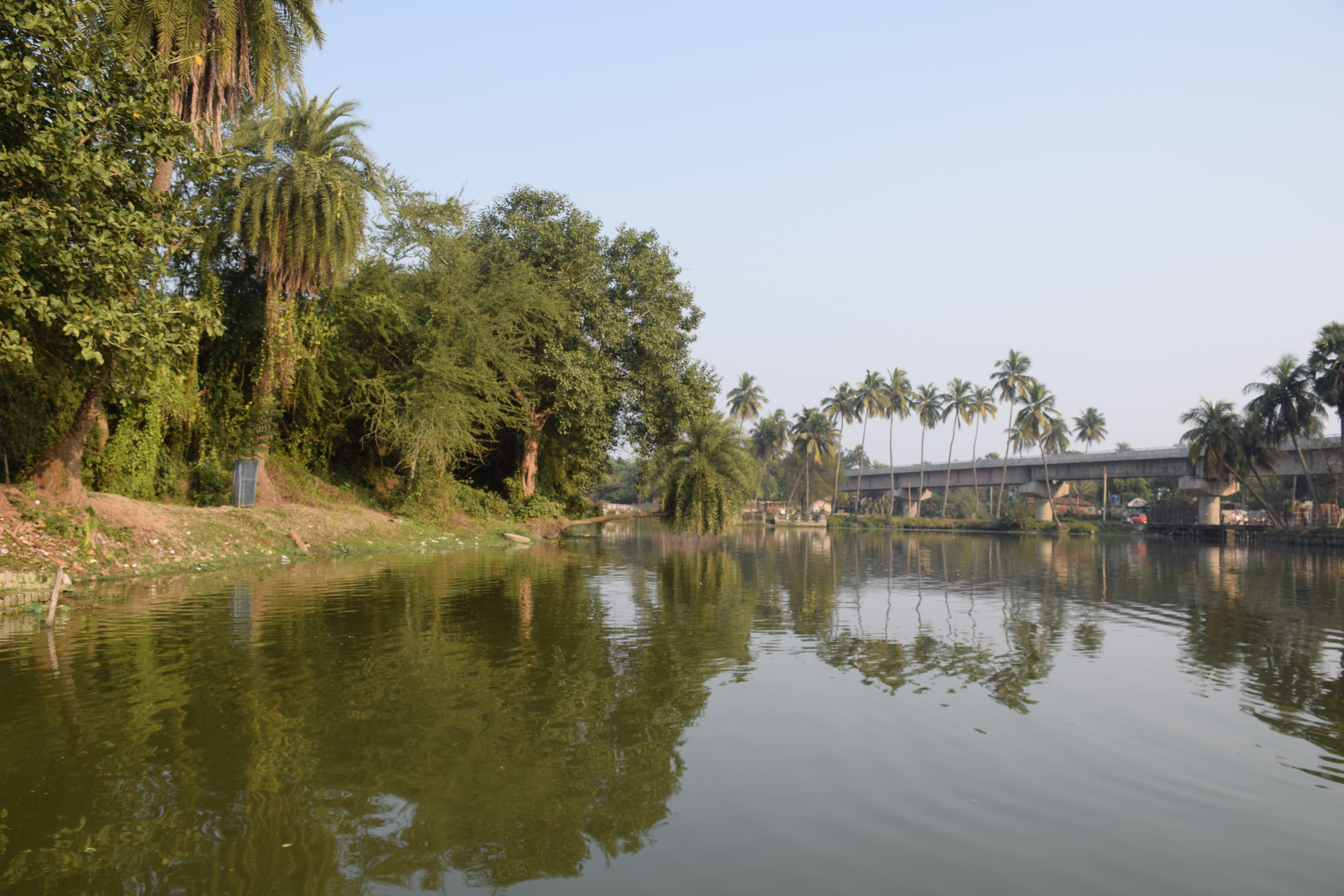

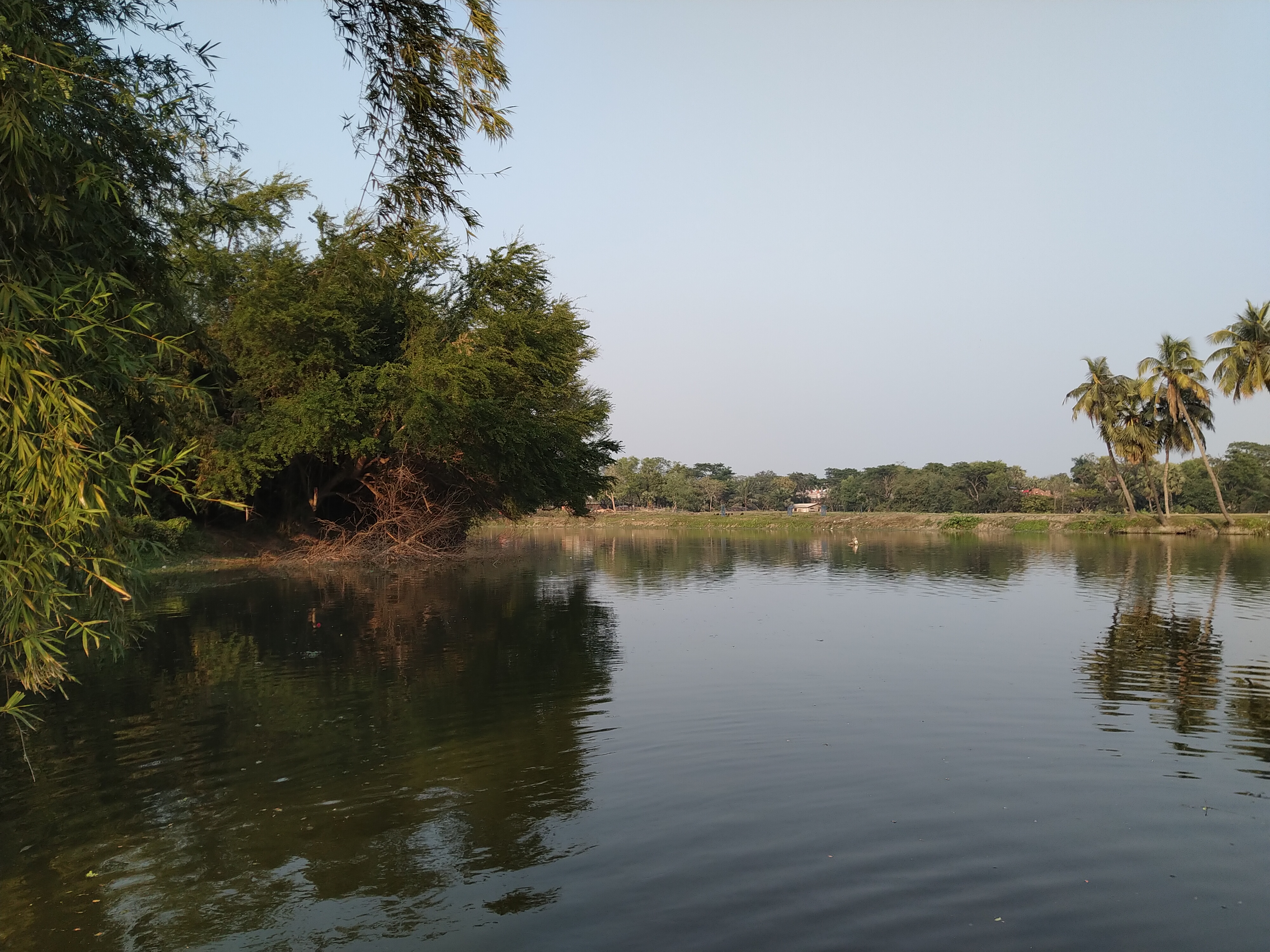

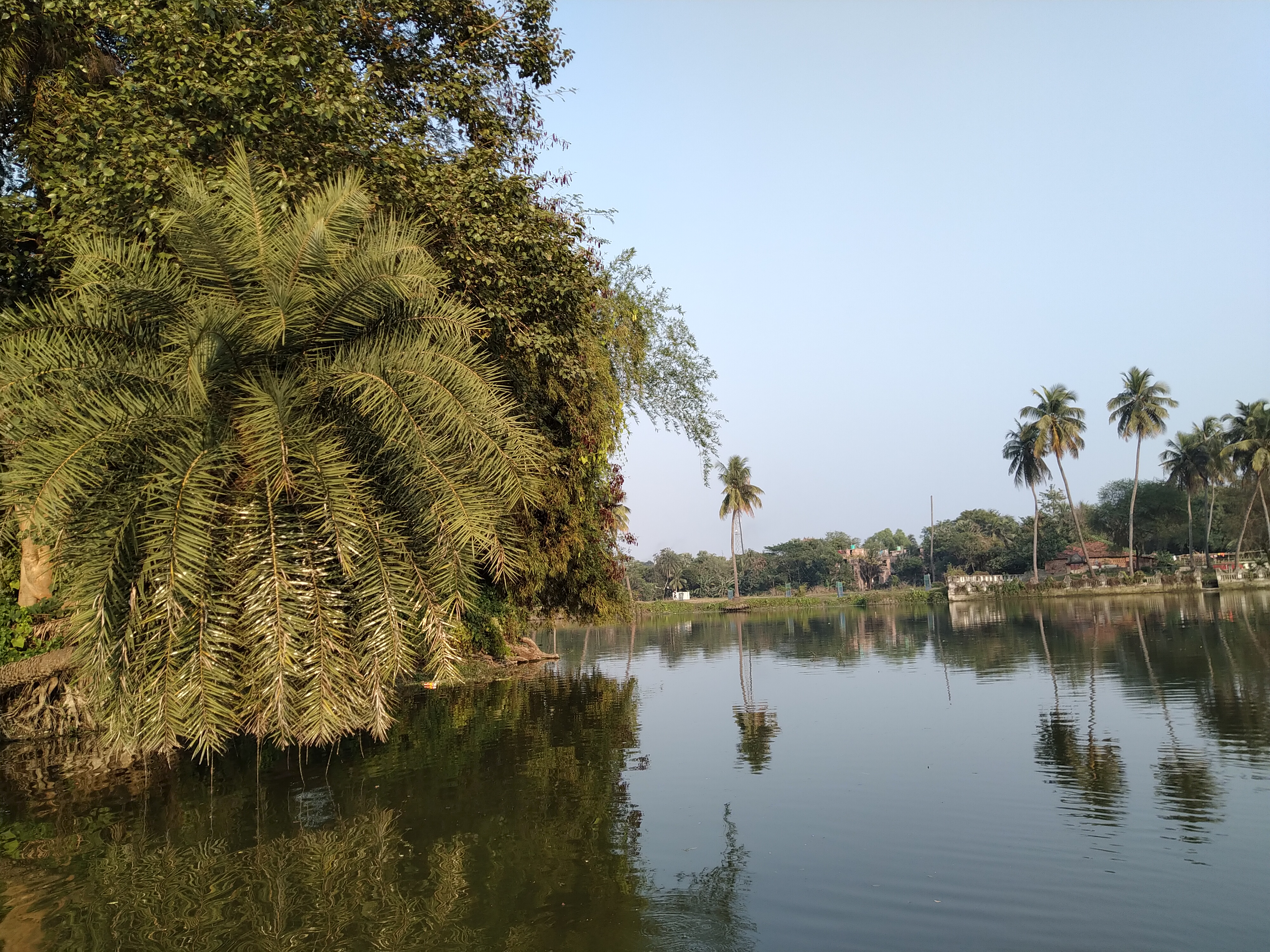

=== Lokeswara Shiva temple ===
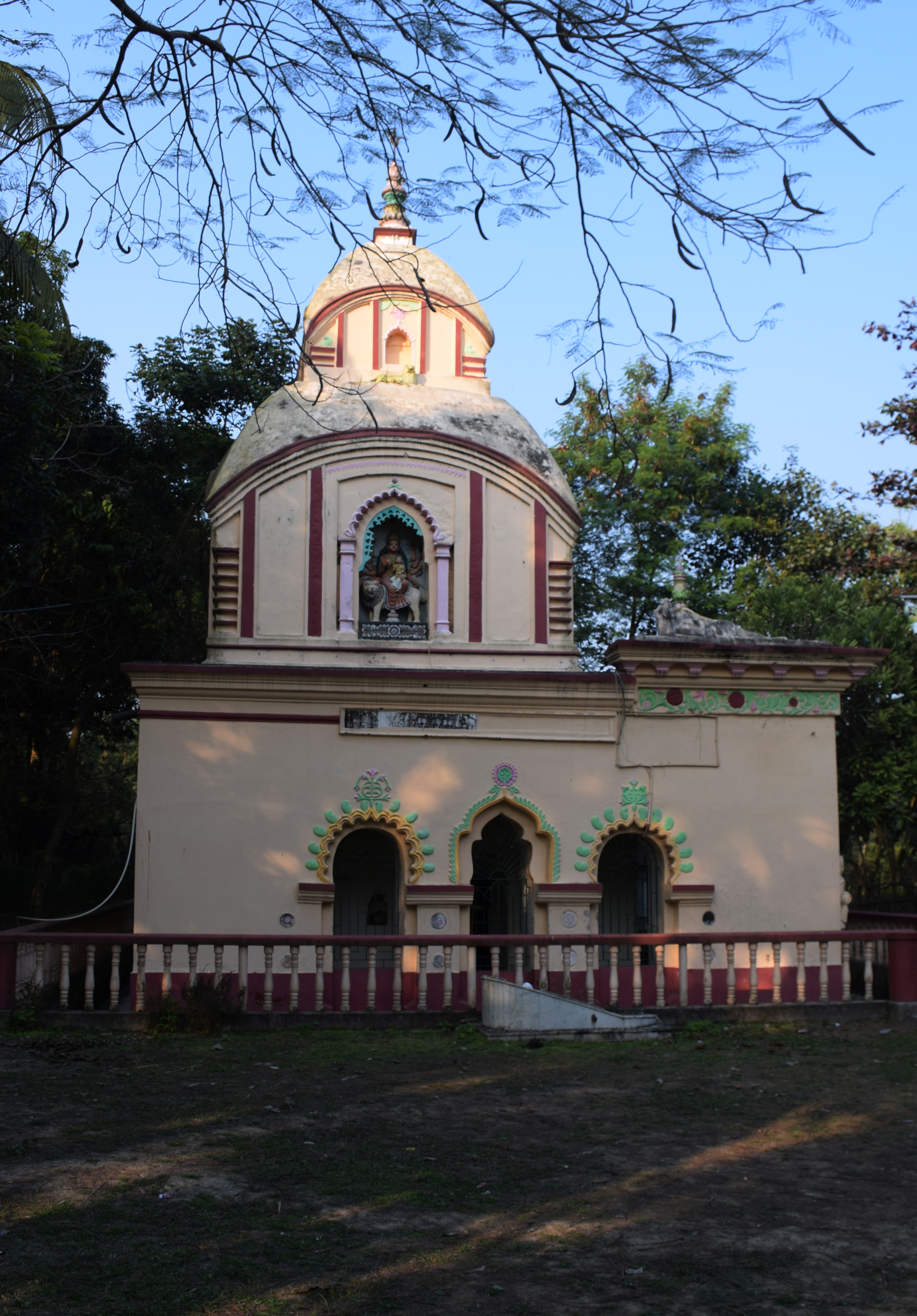

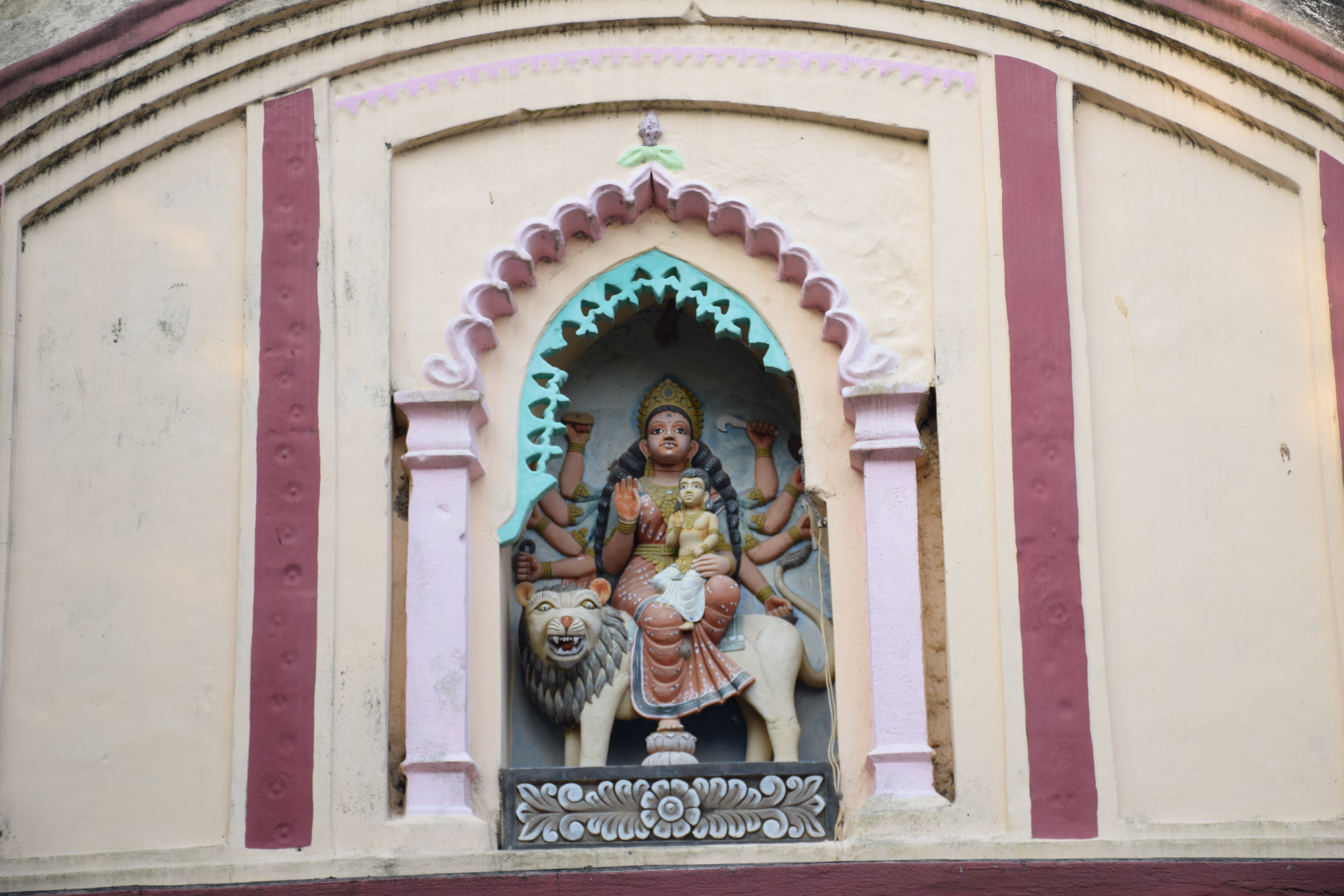

== See also ==
- Bahubalindra Royal Family
- Mahishya
