= Bhuiyan =

Title for landowners in Bengal and Assam

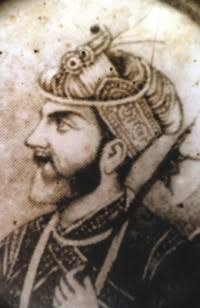
- Isa Khan was the chief of the Bengali Baro-Bhuyans
- Pronunciation: Bhui-yan
- Language: Bengali

Origin
- Region of origin: Bengal

Other names
- Alternative spelling: Bhuiya, Bhuyan, Bhuya
- Cognate: Bhuyan
- Popularity: see popular names

Bhuiyan (also Bhuiya, Bhuyan, Bhuya) was a title for landowners in medieval Bengal and Assam. It has been adopted as a surname by different communities in West Bengal, Assam, and Bangladesh.

== Etymology ==
Bhuiyan was a title used to refer to a landlord or chieftain. It originates from the Sanskrit word, Bhumi, meaning 'land'.

== History ==
=== Bengal ===
The Baro-Bhuyans of Bengal ruled and maintained an independent confederacy after the fall of the Bengal Sultanate's final Karrani dynasty.

Mughal histories, mainly the Akbarnama, the Ain-i-Akbari and the Baharistan-i-Ghaibi refers to the low-lying regions of Bengal as Bhati. This region includes the Bhagirathi to the Meghna River is Bhati, while others include Hijli, Jessore, Chandradwip and Barisal Division in Bhati. Keeping in view the theatre of warfare between the Bara-Bhuiyans and the Mughals, the Baharistan-i-Ghaibi mentions the limits of the area bounded by the Ichamati River in the west, the Ganges in the south, the Tripura to the east; Alapsingh pargana (in present Mymensingh District) and Baniachong in the north. The Bara-Bhuiyans rose to power in this region and put up resistance to the Mughals, until Islam Khan Chisti made them submit in the reign of Jahangir.
