= Chakrapani Datta =

Bengali scholar and Ayurvedic medicine practitioner

Chakrapani Datta (Bengali: চক্রপাণি দত্ত) (c. 11th century) was a Bengali scholar and practitioner of Ayurveda medicine.

In his lifetime, Datta was renowned for his significant contributions to the Ayurveda system of medicine, primarily through his academic commentaries on the primary texts on the field. He is considered to have had a notable impact on Indian medicine through his work.

== Life ==
Chakrapani Datta was believed to have been born in the latter half of the 11th century in the village of Mayureswar, located in what is now West Bengal. He was a Brahmin and belonged to a noble Baidya family, with his father having served as a kitchen superintendent for the Pala emperor, Nayapala. His elder brother Bhanu is described as having been an Antaranga (learned physician). A Pala courtier, Naradatta, acted as Datta's spiritual teacher.

Datta began to gain prominence at a young age through his commentaries on the primary Ayurveda texts: the Charaka Samhita and the Sushruta Samhita. Among his most celebrated works are Chikitsasamgraha (Collection of medical practices and procedures), Dravyaguna (Properties of plants), and Sarvasarsamgraha (Collection of the essence of things). These discussed therapeutic, surgical and physiological treatments to disease and have led to him being regarded as an authority in Ayurveda medicine. His being the first to incorporate metallic recipes among his creed is also considered notable, with historian Durga Prasad Mazumder arguing that it "introduced a new era in medical science".

Datta's accomplishments earned him the exalted titles of Charaka Cheturanana, Sushruta Sahasranayana and Mahamahopadhyaya. His contributions to Sanskrit grammar and Nyaya philosophy are also considered to be noteworthy. They are most prominently shown through his compilation of the Shabdachandrika dictionary and annotations on Gauatama's Nyāya Sūtras respectively.

Through his work, Datta amassed a significant fortune, allowing his descendants to become prominent zamindars, a role they continued in into the 20th century.
