= Mahipala =

Pala emperor from 978 to 1026

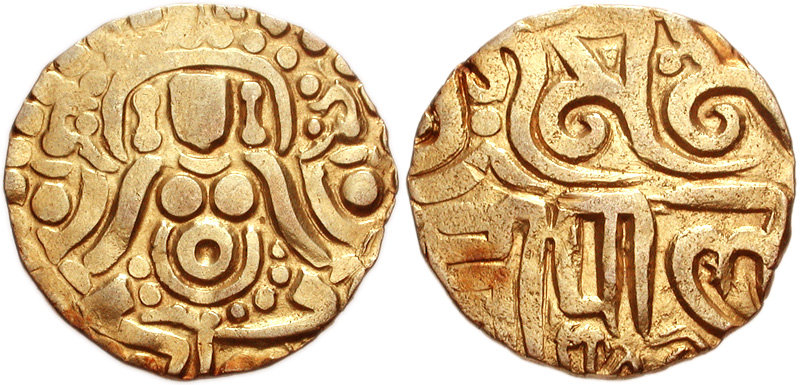
- Gold coin of the Pala Empire, Mahipala I and later. c. 988–1161.

Pala Emperor
- Reign: 978–1026
- Predecessor: Vigrahapala II
- Successor: Nayapala
- Died: 1026
- Issue: Nayapala
- Dynasty: Pala
- Father: Vigrahapala II
- Religion: Shaivism

Mahipala (r. 978–1026), also known as Mahipala I, was the Pala emperor from 978 until his death in 1026. He was the son and successor of Vigrahapala II. Mahipala's reign marked a resurgence in fortunes for the Pala empire, whose boundaries were expanded as far as Varanasi. However, his rule was temporarily hampered by the northern expedition of the Chola Emperor, Rajendra I.

== Biography ==
Mahipala was succeeded by his son, Nayapala.

Preceded by Vigrahapala II	Pala Emperor; 988–1038 CE	Succeeded by Nayapala
