= Gopala III =

Pala Emperor
- Reign: 962–973 CE
- Predecessor: Rajyapala
- Successor: Vigrahapala II
- Issue: Vigrahapala II
- Dynasty: Pala
- Father: Rajyapala
- Mother: Bhagyadevi
- Religion: Buddhism

Gopala III, previously known as Gopala II, was the successor to the Pala king Rajyapala in the Bengal region of the Indian subcontinent, and ninth ruler of the Pala line. He was succeeded by Vigrahapala II.

== Life ==
He was the son of Rajyapala by the Rashtrakuta princess Bhagyadevi, who may be identified as a daughter of Jagattunga, himself a son of Emperor Krishna II. Alternatively, her father may have been Tunga Dharmavaloka, a great-nephew of Krishna I.

During Gopala's reign, the Chandelas and Kalachuris of Tripuri emerged in lands formerly of the Pratiharas. The Kamboja tribes also established themselves in Varendra & Rahr, pushing Gopala outside Bengal. The Dacca copperplate inscription states that Srichandra, the Chandra king of Samatata-Harikela aided Gopala to be crowned king by defeating the armies of Ratna Pala of Kamarupa.

== See also ==
- List of rulers of Bengal
