= Pala Empire =

Early Indian medieval empire

- 750–1161
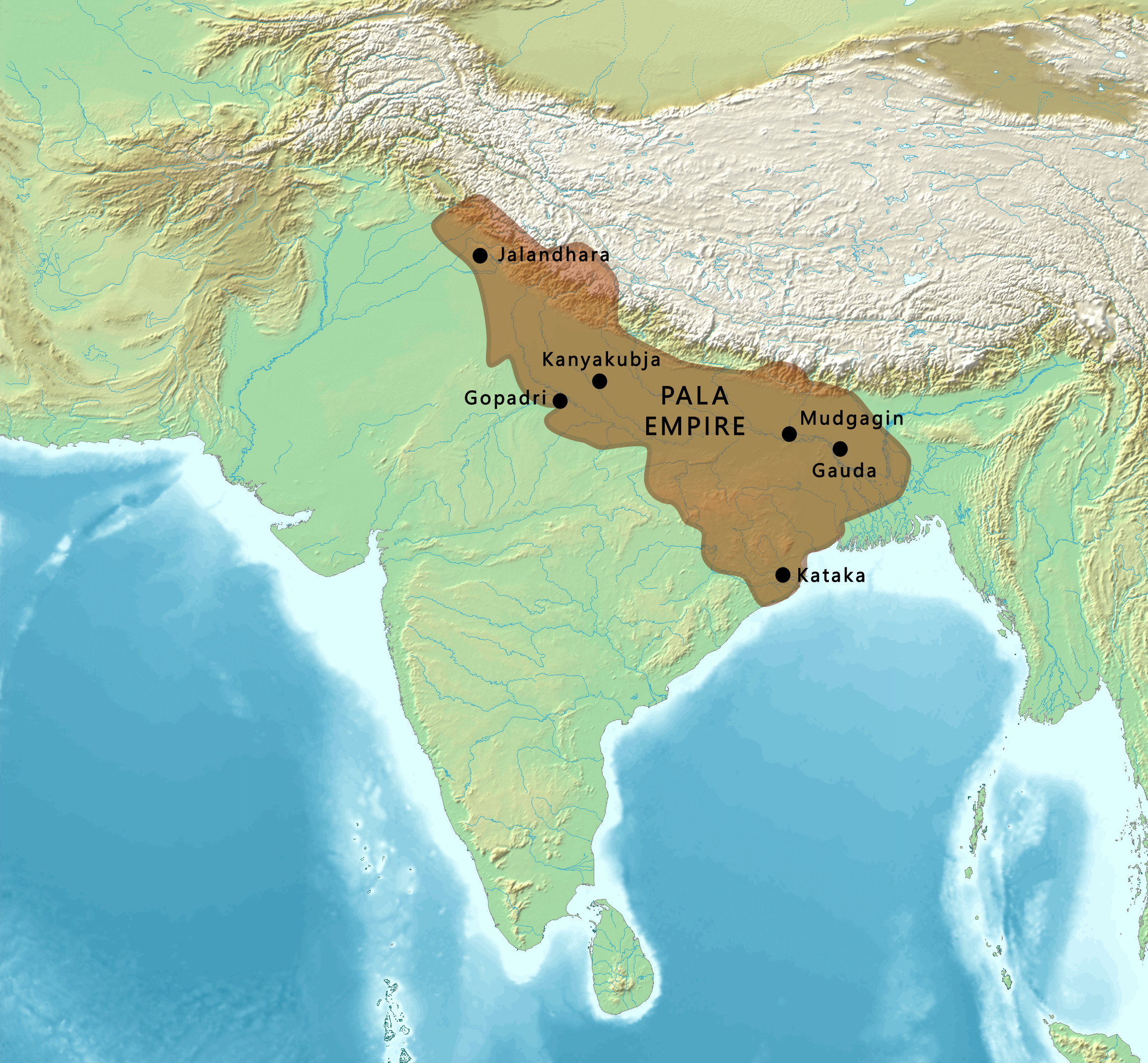
- Pala Empire in the ninth century CE
- Status: Empire
- Capital: Mahipal, Murshidabad; Various (Note: After Devapala, the rulers shifted and established their capitals in Monghyr, Pataliputra and Gauda, Ramavati) (9th century – 1161)
- Common languages: Apabhraṣṭa; Sanskrit
- Religion: Mahayana Buddhism (Note: Mahayana Buddhism in Pala Dynasty: Huntington, Susan L. (1990). Leaves from the Bodhi tree : the art of Pāla India (8th-12th centuries) and its international legacy. Dayton Art Institute in association with the University of Washington Press. p. 81. ISBN 978-0-937809-09-9. "In Buddhist histories and modern historical writings as well, the Palas have been lauded as devout and generous Buddhist patrons. However, it is only possible to confirm the Buddhist leanings of a few Pāla kings with sound archaeological evidence. Further, it appears that none of the Palas patronised Buddhism to the exclusion of other sects. Therefore, Buddhism flourished because of other factors besides royal patronage; an active lay community and patronage by international visitors to the Pāla lands explain much of the artistic and religious vitality of the period."; Coedès, George (1975). The Indianized States of Southeast Asia. University of Hawaii Press. p. 248. ISBN 978-0-8248-0368-1. "This agitated period, which followed the accession of the T'ang emperors in China and coin-cided with the apogee of the Buddhist dynasty of Java, also saw the expansion of Mahayana Buddhism in Farther India under the influence of the Indian Pala dynasty and the university of Nalanda in Bengal"; Kulke, Hermann; Rothermund, Dietmar (2004). A History of India. Psychology Press. p. 159. ISBN 978-0-415-32920-0. "The influence of Mahayana Buddhism prevailing in Bihar and Bengal under the Palas was so strong at the court of the Shailendras of Java that a Buddhist monk from 'Gaudi' (Bengal), with the typical Bengali name of Kumara Ghosh, became rajguru of the Shailendra king"; Sen, Sailendra Nath (1999). Ancient Indian History and Civilization. New Age International. p. 285. ISBN 978-81-224-1198-0.); Shaktism (Note: Shaktism in Pala Dynasty: Sarkar, Bihani (2017). Heroic Shāktism: The Cult of Durgā in Ancient Indian Kingship. British Academy. pp. 120–121. doi:10.5871/bacad/9780197266106.001.0001. ISBN 978-0-19-726610-6.; Sarkar, Bihani (2012). "The Rite of Durgā in Medieval Bengal: An Introductory Study of Raghunandana's". Journal of the Royal Asiatic Society. 22 (2). Cambridge University Press: 325. doi:10.1017/S1356186312000181. ISSN 1474-0591. "The discussion of the Pala kings' great patronage of goddesses such as Carcika, Gauri, the Navadurgas etc., is to be found in Sanderson 2009, pp. 108-114."; Tyagi & Jha (2017, p. 50): "Personally, Gopal was a devotee of 'Chunda Devi'. This deity can be identified with Shakta female deity – Chamundi."); Shaivism (Note: Shaivism in Pala Dynasty: Sanderson, Alexis (2009). "The Śaiva Age: The Rise and Dominance of Śaivism during the Early Medieval Period". In Shingo Einoo (ed.). Genesis and Development of Tantrism. Institute of Oriental Culture, University of Tokyo. pp. 108–115. ISBN 9784903235080.; Sarkar (2016, p. 170); "It was before the time of the Pâla dynasty that Shaivaism had struck roots in Bengal. But it was under this dynasty that the predominant voice of the Brahmaņa ministers enhanced its influence and es-tablished Hinduism over Buddhism. More especially during the reign of Nârâyaņapâla Shaivaism gained an extensive hold upon the minds of the people. Buddhism was being driven out of Bengal, and what remained of it was so simply in name, the substance becoming gradually identified with Shaivaism."; "Being pro-tected from opposition and its course made smooth, the Shaiva creed gradually spread over the whole territory of the Pâla kings"; Mukhopadhyay, S. (1984). Candi in Art and Iconography. BRILL. p. 85. ISBN 978-0-391-03291-0. "Inscriptional evidence and the discoveries of a number of Saivite icons give evidence of the wide popularity of Saivism in Bengal during the Pala-sena period."; Flåten, Lars Tore (4 October 2016). Hindu Nationalism, History and Identity in India: Narrating a Hindu past under the BJP. Routledge. p. 86. ISBN 978-1-317-20871-6. "The Pala kings patronised Hinduism too. They gave donations for learning and for educational purposes.")
- Government: Monarchy
- Emperor
  - 750–770: Gopala (first)
  - 1139–1161: Govindapala (last)
- Historical era: Early Medieval
  - Established: 750
  - Disestablished: 1161

Population
  - 1000 estimate: 17,000,000
Preceded by
Khadga dynasty
Varman dynasty
Succeeded by
Sena dynasty
Karnats of Mithila
Pithipatis of Bodh Gaya
- Today part of: India; Bangladesh; Nepal; Pakistan

The Pāla Empire was an early medieval Indian empire ruled by the Pāla (Prakrit and Sanskrit: पाल, romanized: Pāla, lit. 'protector') dynasty. The empire was founded with the election of Gopāla by the chiefs of Gauda in the late 8th century CE. The Pala stronghold was located in Bengal and Bihar, which included the major cities of Gauḍa, Vikramapura, Pāṭaliputra, Monghyr, Somapura, Ramavati (Varendra), Tāmralipta and Jagaddala.

The Pālas were astute diplomats and military conquerors. Their army was noted for its vast war elephant corps. Their navy performed both mercantile and defensive roles in the Bay of Bengal. At its zenith under emperors Dharmapala and Devapala in the early ninth century, the Pala Empire was the dominant power in northern India, with its territory stretching across the Gangetic Plain down to the Vindhya Range and may have extended to Goalpara in Assam. Dharmapala also exerted influence through the Buddhist scholar Atis Dipankar in Tibet, as well as in Southeast Asia. He was referred to as uttarapathaswami. After a brief period of decline, emperor Mahipala successfully defended his domains in Bengal and Bihar against the south Indian Chola invasions. Ramapala was the last strong Pala emperor who held control of Kamarupa and Kalinga. The empire became considerably weakened with their heavy dependence on Samantas being exposed after 11th-century Varendra rebellion, which led to the rise of resurgent Hindu Senas as sovereign power in the 12th century and expulsion of the Palas from Bengal, marking the end of the last major Buddhist imperial power in the subcontinent.

The Pala period is considered one of the golden eras of Bengali history. The Palas brought stability and prosperity to Bengal after centuries of civil war between warring divisions. They advanced the achievements of previous Bengali civilisations and created outstanding works of arts and architecture. The Charyapada in Apabhraṣṭas was written by Buddhist Mahasiddhas of tantric tradition, which laid the basis of several eastern Indian languages in their rule. Palas built grand Buddhist temples and monasteries (Viharas), including the Somapura Mahavihara and Odantapuri, and patronised the great universities of Nalanda and Vikramashila. The Pala empire maintained relations with the Srivijaya Empire, the Tibetan Empire and the Arab Abbasid Caliphate. Islam first arrived in Bengal during this period as a result of flourishing mercantile and intellectual contacts with the West Asia (i.e., Middle East). The Pala legacy is still reflected in Tibetan Buddhism.

== History ==
=== Origins ===
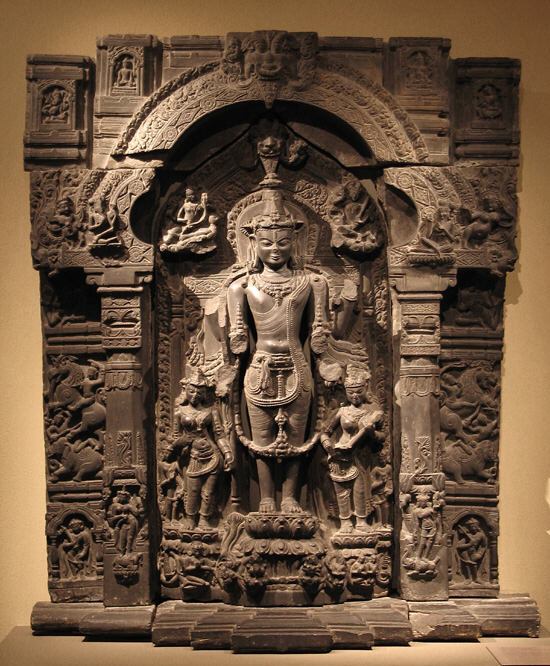
Vishnu with His Consorts, Lakshmi and Sarasvati, 11–12th century, Bihar or Bengal, Pala period

The origin and early history of the Palas is uncertain, with historians relying on indirect evidence regarding their ancestry.

The 11th-century Sanskrit epic Ramacharitam, written by a Pala court poet, states that Varendra (North Bengal) was the fatherland (Janakabhu) of the Palas. In Ramacharitam Dharmapala is hailed as the glory of the 'Samudra' (oceanic) dynasty; it also attests the fifteenth Pala emperor, Ramapala, as a Kshatriya. The 16th-century Tibetan Lama Taranatha in his History of Buddhism in India described that Gopala was born of the seed of a certain tree-god from the womb of a Kshatriya woman. Historian Niharranjan Ray mentions that this story is connected with totemic lore, and it is a reflection of the society outside of Puranic Brahmanism. Taranatha too suggested a close connection between Dharmapala and the Samudras (Seas), and in the 17th-century Dharmamangal of Ghanaram there is the suggestion of a relationship between Dharmapala's queen and the Samudras. Niharranjan Ray hence suggested some possible relationship between the Pala kings and the ocean-going men of Gauda.

The Ballala-Carita, written in the 15th century, states that the Palas were low Kshatriyas, as does Ghanaram in his Dharmamangal. The Pala dynasty has also been branded as Shudra in some sources such as the 8th-century Manjushri-Mulakalpa. The 16th-century historian Abul Fazl going by this tradition described these kings as Kayasthass. According to Dr. K. N. Sahay, "Pala was also a Kayastha surname and we can claim Palas also as Kayasthas".

In the 11th-century Sanskrit tale Udayasundari-Katha by Soddhala, Dharmapala is said to be a descendant of the Solar dynasty. In the Kamauli inscription issued by Pala minister Vaidyadeva (later king of Kamarupa) the Pala rulers are likewise referred to as belonging to the Solar dynasty (Mihiravamsa). According to Nitish Sengupta, such claims of belonging to the legendary Solar dynasty seems to be unreliable and appear to be an attempt to cover up the humble origins of the dynasty.

Modern scholars believe Palas were Buddhists as their court became a stronghold and their copper plates emphasised Buddhist affiliation but large majority of images and inscriptions testify that the Palas patronized the brahmans and the worship of Shiva and Vishnu. André Wink mentions that the founder, Gopala was elected, and "definitely not of royal blood but probably of a line of brahmans which transformed itself into kshatriyas". Wink further describes that as per an Arabic source Pāla was 'not a king of noble origin'.

=== Establishment ===
After the fall of Shashanka's kingdom, the Bengal region was in a state of anarchy. There was no central authority, and there was constant struggle between petty chieftains. The contemporary writings describe this situation as matsya nyaya ("fish justice" i.e. a situation where the big fish eat the small fish).

Gopala ascended the throne as the first Pala king during these times. A eulogy on the Khalimpur copper plate of Gopala names his father as Vapyata, describing him as a Khanditarati or "killer of enemies", and his grandfather Dayitavishnu as Sarva-vidyavadata ("all-knowing" in the sense "highly educated"). As per a contemporary source, Gopala was born in a family of Dasajivinah. The Khalimpur copper plate suggests that the prakriti (people) of the region made him the king. Taranatha, writing nearly 800 years later, also writes that he was democratically elected by the people of Bengal. However, his account is in form of a legend, and is considered historically unreliable. The legend mentions that after a period of anarchy, the people elected several kings in succession, all of whom were consumed by the Naga queen of an earlier king on the night following their election. Gopala, however managed to kill the queen and remained on the throne. The historical evidence indicates that Gopala was not elected directly by his citizens, but by a group of feudal chieftains. Such elections were quite common in contemporary societies of the region.

Gopala's ascension in 750 CE was a significant political event as several independent chiefs recognized his political authority without any struggle, consolidating his power over the whole of Bengal including Gaur, Varendra and Banga, also extending his rule over parts of Magadha. According to R. C. Majumdar, Gopala ruled till 770 CE.

=== Imperial expansion and consolidation ===
Gopala's empire was greatly expanded by his son Dharmapala and his grandson Devapala. Dharmapala was initially defeated by the Pratihara ruler Vatsaraja. Later, the Rashtrakuta king Dhruva defeated both Dharmapala and Vatsaraja. After Dhruva left for the Deccan region, Dharmapala built a mighty empire in the northern India. He defeated Indrayudha of Kannauj, and installed his own nominee Chakrayudha on the throne of Kannauj. Several other smaller states in North India also acknowledged his suzerainty, as far as Jalandhara. Soon, his expansion was checked by Vatsaraja's son Nagabhata II, who conquered Kannauj and drove away Chakrayudha. Nagabhata II then advanced up to Munger and defeated Dharmapala in a pitched battle. Dharmapala was forced to surrender and to seek alliance with the Rashtrakuta emperor Govinda III, who then intervened by invading northern India and defeating Nagabhata II. The Rashtrakuta records show that both Chakrayudha and Dharmapala recognised the Rashtrakuta suzerainty. In practice, Dharmapala gained control over North India after Govinda III left for the Deccan. He adopted the title Paramesvara Paramabhattaraka Maharajadhiraja.

Dharmapala was succeeded by his son Devapala, who is regarded as the most powerful Pala Emperor. His expeditions resulted in the invasion of Pragjyotisha (present-day Assam) where the king submitted without giving a fight and the Utkala (present-day Northern Odisha) whose king fled from his capital city. The inscriptions of his successors also claim several other territorial conquests by him, but these are possibly exaggerated (see the Geography section below).

According to Tibetan sources, the emperors; Khri-srong-lda-btsan (Trisong Detsen) and his son, Mu-teg-btsan-po (Ralpacan), conquered India and made Dharmapala submit. Whether this is historically accurate has been debated between historians however it can be asserted that Devapala came into conflict with the Tibetans. Chinese records, indicate Tibetan control over the Himalayas was lost from 839 to 848 CE which was during Devapala's reign. During the period when Dharmapala's reign was coming to a close and Devapala's reign was beginning, the Pratihāra ruler Nagabhatta attacked the Palas allied with the Tibetan Empire. Devapala defeated the Tibetan kings. The Dullu inscription of King Prithvimalla confirms Devapala's conquest with the mention of the establishment of the Pala Dynasty of Nepal with the first ruler being Adipala whose lineage would continue to rule for sixteen generations.

Devapala's oldest son, Rajyapala predeceased him, and as so Mahendrapala, his next older son succeeded him. He possibly maintained his father's vast territories and carried out further campaigns against the Utkalas and the Hunas. He passed his empire intact to his younger brother Shurapala I, who held sway over a considerably large territory encompassing Bengal, Bihar and Uttar Pradesh, proven by his Mirzapur copperplate. What happened in Gopala II's rule, the son of Surapala I, is still unknown. After Gopala II, Dharmapala's line came to an end for reasons which are not known yet. Dharmapala's descendants, if any, were passed over as Dharmapala's younger brother, Vakapala's lineage assumed the throne.

=== First period of decline ===
Shortly afterwards, the empire gradually started disintegrating. Vakapala's grandson and Jayapala's son, Vigrahapala I abdicated the throne after a brief rule, and became an ascetic. Vigrahapala's son and successor Narayanapala proved to be a weak ruler. During his 54-year long reign, Mihira Bhoja defeated the Palas. Encouraged by the Pala decline, the King Harjara of Assam assumed imperial titles.

Naryanapala's son Rajyapala ruled for at least 32 years, and constructed several public utilities and lofty temples. Earlier it was thought that his son Gopala III lost Bengal after a few years of rule, and then ruled only Bihar. However, it has been debunked by his Bhagalpur inscription, in which he granted a Brahmin two villages in Pundrabardhanabhukti in Northern Bengal, signalling his control over it. His son and the next king, Vigrahapala II, had to bear the invasions from the Chandelas and the Kalachuris. During his reign, the Pala empire disintegrated into smaller kingdoms like Gauda, Radha, Anga and Vanga. Kantideva of Harikela (eastern and southern Bengal) also assumed the title Maharajadhiraja, and established a separate kingdom, later ruled by the Chandra dynasty. The Gauda state (West and North Bengal) was ruled by the Kamboja Pala dynasty. The rulers of this dynasty also bore names ending in the suffix -pala (e.g. Rajyapala, Narayanapala and Nayapala). However, their origin is uncertain, and the most plausible view is that they originated from a Pala official who usurped a major part of the Pala kingdom along with its capital.

=== Revival under Mahipala I ===
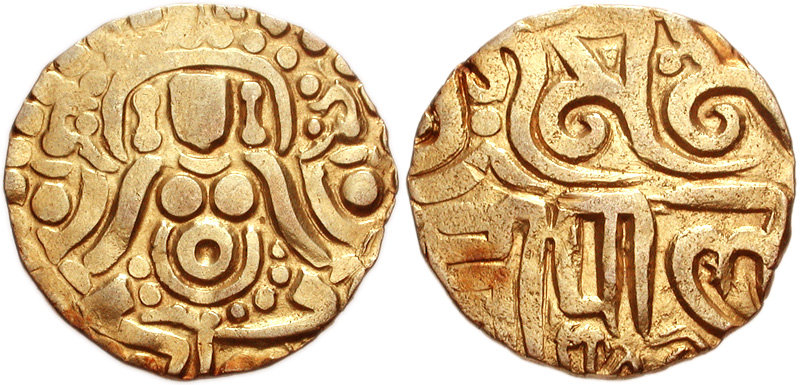
Coin of the Pala Empire, Mahipala and later. Circa 988–1161 CE

Mahipala I recovered northern and eastern Bengal within three years of ascending the throne in 978 CE. He also recovered his capital, Gauda, which had been lost to he Kambojas. He also recovered the northern part of the present-day Burdwan division. During his reign, Rajendra Chola I of the Chola Empire frequently invaded Bengal from 1021 to 1023 CE to get Ganges water and in the process, succeeded to humble the rulers, acquiring considerable booty. The rulers of Bengal who were defeated by Rajendra Chola were Dharmapal, Ranasur and Govindachandra, who might have been feudatories under Mahipala I of the Pala Dynasty. Rajendra Chola I also defeated Mahipala, and obtained from the Pala king "elephants of rare strength, women and treasure". Mahipala also gained control of north and south Bihar, probably aided by the invasions of Mahmud of Ghazni, which exhausted the strength of other rulers of North India. He may have also conquered Varanasi and surrounding area, as his brothers Sthirapala and Vasantapala undertook construction and repairs of several sacred structures at Varanasi. Later, the Kalachuri king Gangeyadeva annexed Varanasi after defeating the ruler of Anga, which was probably Mahipala's son Nayapala.

=== Second period of decline ===
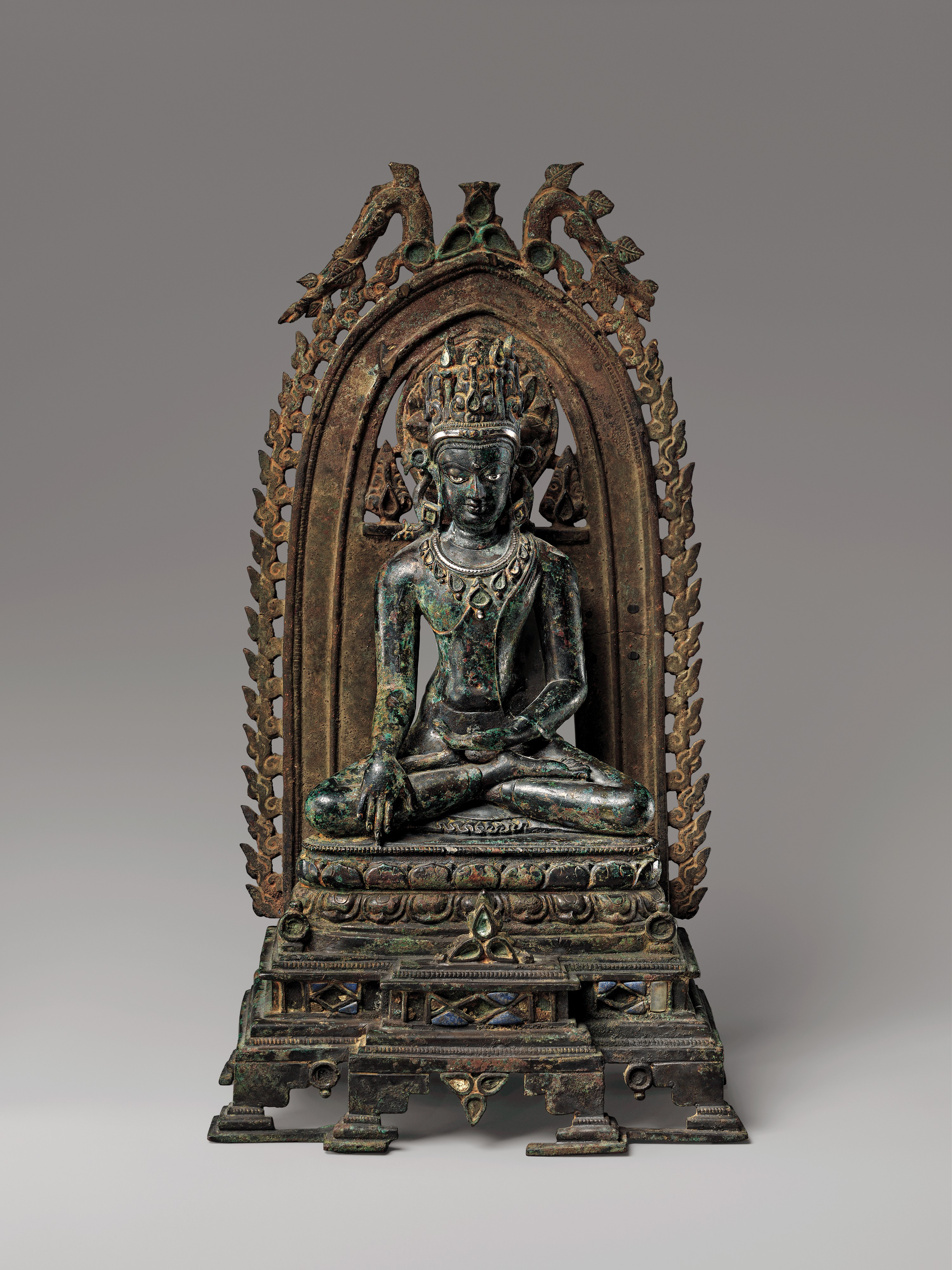
Bronze crowned Buddha, Bihar, Pala Empire, 10th–11th century

Nayapala, the son of Mahipala I, defeated the Kalachuri king Karna (son of Ganggeyadeva) after a long struggle. The two later signed a peace treaty at the mediation of the Buddhist scholar Atiśa. During the reign of Nayapala's son Vigrahapala III, Karna once again invaded Bengal but was defeated. The conflict ended with a peace treaty, and Vigrahapala III married Karna's daughter Yauvanasri. Vigrahapala III was later defeated by the invading Chalukya king Vikramaditya VI. Vigrahapala III also faced another invasion led by the Somavamsi king Mahasivagupta Yayati of Orissa. Subsequently, a series of invasions considerably reduced the power of the Palas. The Varmans occupied eastern Bengal during his reign.

The successor and older son of Vighrahapala III by his wife Yauvanashri, Mahipala II's reign is well-documented by Sandhyakar Nandi in Ramacharitam. Mahipala II imprisoned his brothers Ramapala and Surapala II, on the suspicion that they were conspiring against him. Soon afterwards, he faced a rebellion of Samantas led by Kaivarta vassal Divya. Divya (or, Dibyak) killed him and occupied the Varendra region. The region remained under the control of his successors Rudak and Bhima. Surapala II escaped to Magadha and died after a short reign. He was succeeded by his brother Ramapala, who launched a major offensive against Divya's nephew Bhima. He was supported by his maternal uncle Mathana and cousin Sivarajadeva of the Rashtrakuta dynasty, as well as several feudatory chiefs of south Bihar and south-west Bengal. Ramapala conclusively defeated Bhima, killing him and his family in a cruel manner. Historian Ryosuke Furui noted that Kaivarta rebellion decisively weakened Pala's control over subordinate rulers. It also paved the way for their fall in the hands of another power, the Senas, who rose after the event.

=== Revival under Ramapala ===
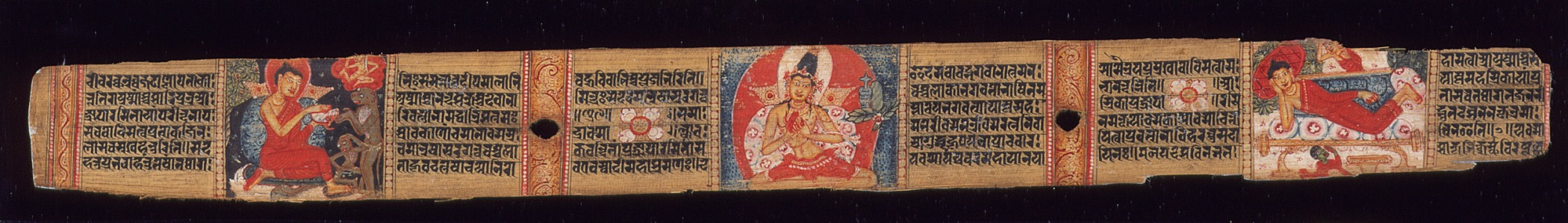
Maitreya and scenes from the Buddha's life. Folios were probably from the Pala period under Ramapala, considered the last great ruler of the Pala dynasty.

After gaining control of Varendra, Ramapala tried to revive the Pala Empire with some success. He ruled from a new capital at Ramavati, which remained the Pala capital until the dynasty's end. He reduced taxation, promoted cultivation and constructed public utilities. He brought Kamarupa and Rar under his control, and forced the Varman king of east Bengal to accept his suzerainty. He also struggled with the Ganga king for control of present-day Orissa; the Gangas managed to annexe the region only after his death. Ramapala maintained friendly relations with the Chola king Kulottunga to secure support against the common enemies: the Ganas and the Chalukyas. He kept the Senas in check but lost Mithila to a Karnat chief named Nanyadeva who formed his own kingdom based out of Mithila. He also held back the aggressive design of the Gahadavala ruler Govindacharndra through a matrimonial alliance, by marrying off his cousin Kumaradevi to the king.

In the region of Magadha, Vallabharāja, an adventurer from Ratanpur led a campaign against the Ramapala with his base of operations in Bodh Gaya. It has been speculated that he was aided in his campaign by Govindachandra of the Gahadavala dynasty. After gaining control of Bodh Gaya he converted to Buddhism and took on the new name, Devaraksita. At this point, he made peace with the Palas by marrying the daughter of Mahana Pala (uncle of Ramapala). His dynasty became known as the Pithipatis.

=== Final decline ===
Ramapala was the final strong Pala Emperor, although his son Kumarapala managed to keep most of his territories. After his death, a rebellion broke out in Kamarupa during his son Kumarapala's reign. The rebellion was crushed by Vaidyadeva, minister of Kumarapala. Vaidyadeva also won a naval war in southern Bengal for his liege. but after Kumarapala's death, Vaidyadeva practically created a separate kingdom. Kumarapala's son, Gopala IV ascended the throne as a child, and according to the Rajibpur copperplate inscription, his uncle Madanpala acted as his regent. Gopala IV either died in battle or was murdered by Madanapala. During Madanapala's rule, the Varmans in east Bengal declared independence, and the Eastern Gangas renewed the conflict in Orissa. Madanapala captured Munger from the Gahadavalas, but was defeated by Vijayasena, who gained control of southern and eastern Bengal. Two rulers, named Govindapala and Palapala ruled over the Gaya district from around 1162 CE to 1200 CE, but there is no concrete evidence about their relationship to the imperial Palas. The Pala dynasty was replaced by the Sena dynasty. The descendants of the Palas, who claimed the status of Kshatriya, "almost imperceptibly merged" with the Kayastha caste.

== Geography ==
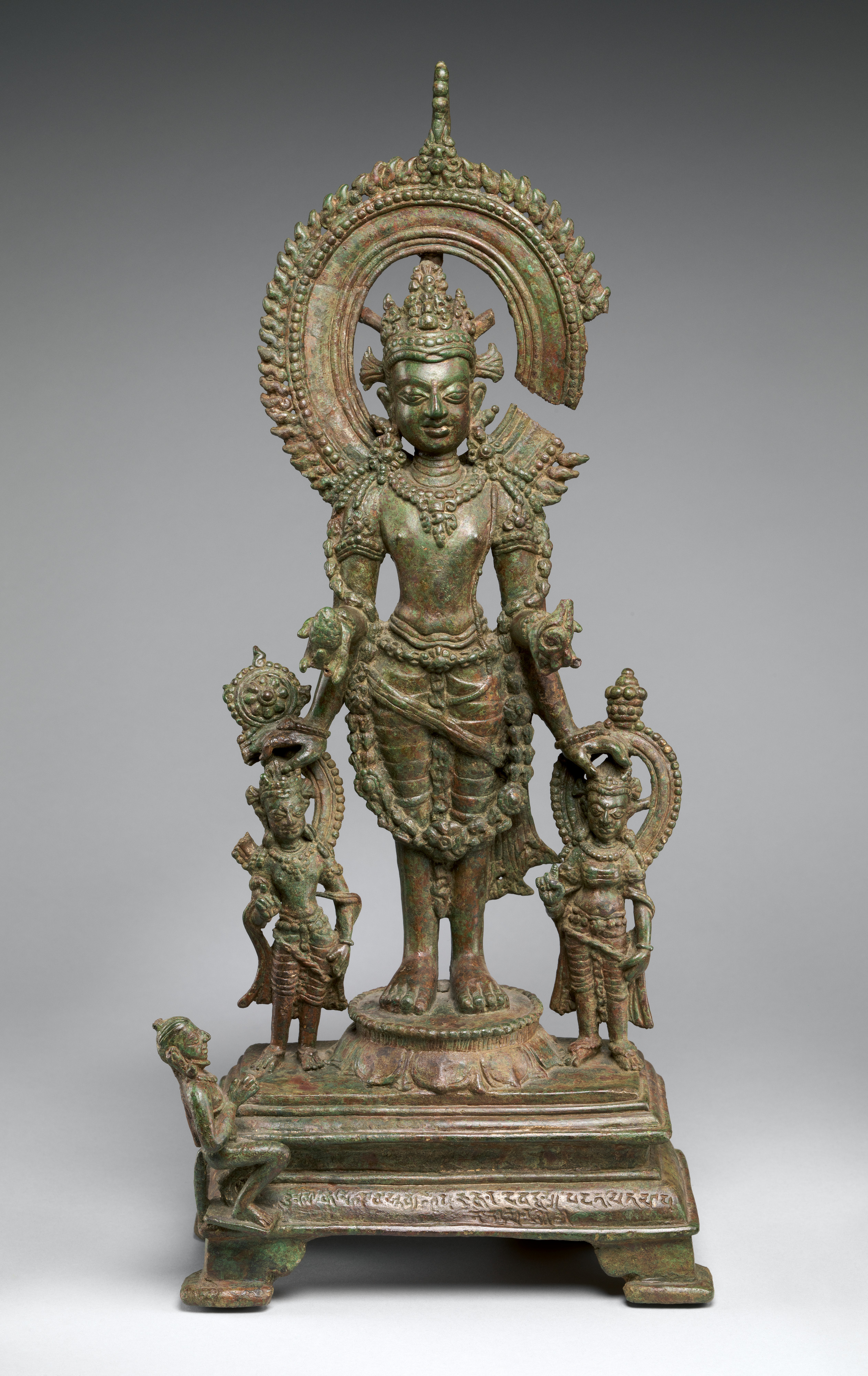
Vishnu Flanked by His Personified Attributes, early 9th century CE, Pala period, Bihar, India

The borders of the Pala Empire kept fluctuating throughout its existence. Though the Palas conquered a vast region in North India at one time, they could not retain it for long due to constant hostility from the Gurjara-Pratiharas, the Rashtrakutas and other less powerful kings.

No records are available about the exact boundaries of original kingdom established by Gopala, but it might have included almost all of the Bengal region. The Pala Empire extended substantially under Dharmapala's rule. Apart from Bengal, he directly ruled the present-day Bihar. The kingdom of Kannauj (present-day Uttar Pradesh) was a Pala dependency at times, ruled by his nominee Chakrayudha. While installing his nominee on the Kannauj throne, Dharmapala organised an imperial court. According to the Khalimpur copper plate issued by Dharmapala, this court was attended by the rulers of Bhoja (possibly Vidarbha), Matsya (Jaipur region), Madra (East Punjab), Kuru (Delhi region), Yadu (possibly Mathura, Dwarka or Simhapura in the Punjab), Yavana, Avanti, Gandhara and Kira (Kangra Valley). These kings accepted the installation of Chakrayudha on the Kannauj throne, while "bowing down respectfully with their diadems trembling". This indicates that his position as a sovereign was accepted by most rulers, although this was a loose arrangement unlike the empire of the Mauryas or the Guptas. The other rulers acknowledged the military and political supremacy of Dharmapala, but maintained their own territories. The poet Soddhala of Gujarat calls Dharmapala an Uttarapathasvamin ("Lord of the North") for his suzerainty over North India.

=== Badal Pillar Inscription ===
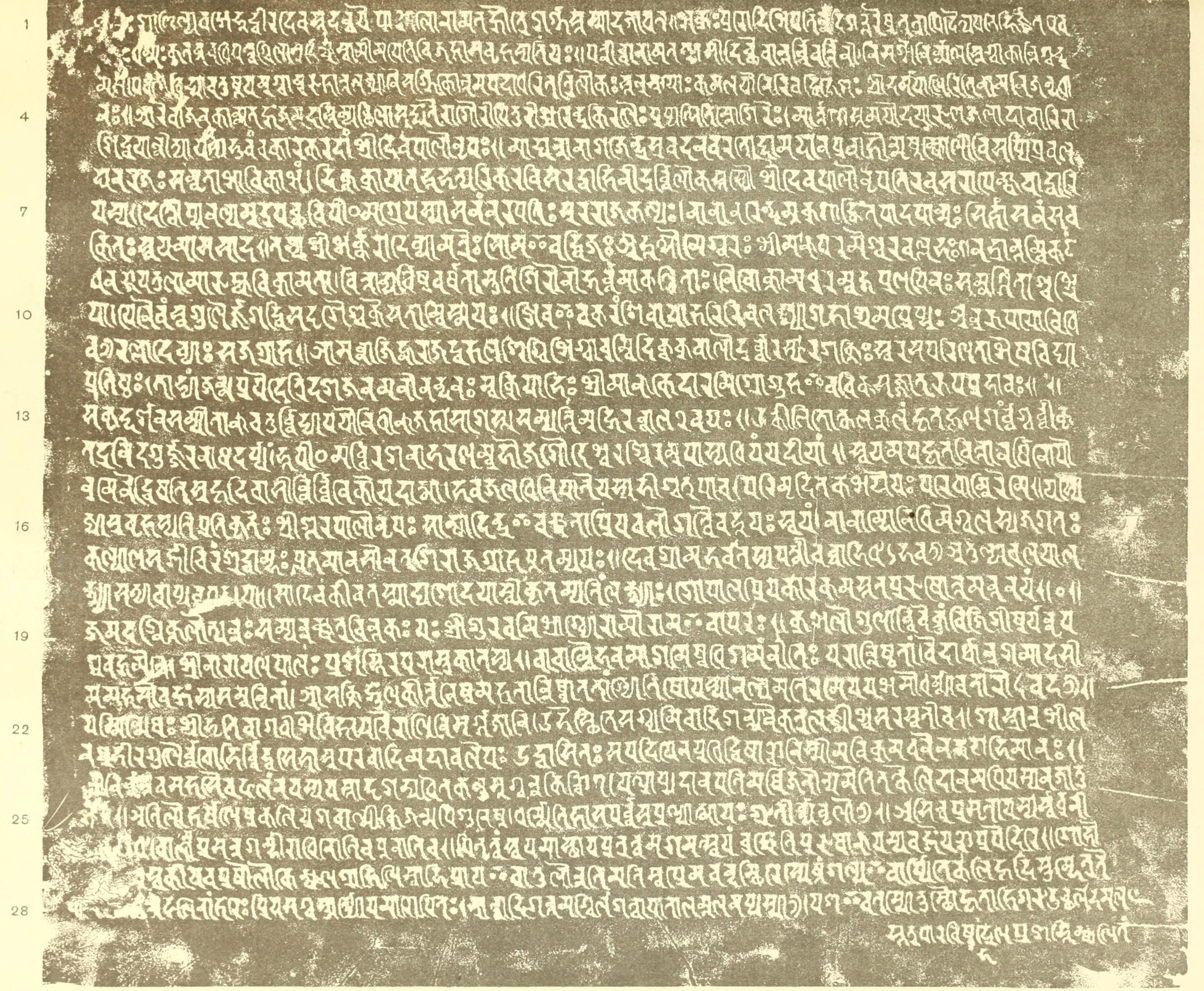
The Badal Pillar Inscription of Narayanapala (7th Pala Emperor)

In Devapala's own inscription and in the inscription referring to his reign (Badal Pillar Inscription), he is credited with the subjugation of the Gurjaras, Dravidas, Utkalas, Pragjyotisas, Hunas and the Kambhojas:

- The Gurjaras mentioned were no doubt the Pratiharas and it is inferred that the Pratihara king was Mihir Bhoja.
- The Dravida king mentioned in the inscriptions was generally thought to be the Rashtrakuta's Amoghavarsha but has been identified as the Pandya King, Sri-Mara Sri-Vallabha.
- The subjugation of the Utkalas (Bhauma-Kara dynasty) naturally brought Devapala into geographical contact with the southern peninsula and it wasn't unnatural that hostilities developed between the contemporary Pala and Pandya rulers.
- Pragjyotisa or Assam accepted the suzerainty of Devapala and it has been inferred that the king of Assam was either Pralambha or Harjara.
- Majumdar points that Hunas were a principality in Uttarapatha (near Himalayas) and were subjugated by Devapala.

Devapala is credited not only with the Digvijaya (conquest) of Aryavarta in the Badal inscription but also with the Digvijaya (conquest) of the whole of Bharatavarṣa (India) mentioned in his Monghyr Plates. According to Nitish K. Sengupta, the Badal Pillar inscription is highly exaggerated. However, Both Pramode Lal Paul and Ratikanta Tripathi assert that the statement, "the whole tract bounded by the Vindhyas and the Himalayas and by the eastern and western seas paid tribute to Devapala", was not merely a political exaggeration in the Badal inscription, but an actual fact. Moreover, Taranatha also credits Devapala for having subjugated the whole of Northern India from the Himalayas to the Vindhyan Mountains. Devapala's control over the east sea (Arabian Sea) can also be proved by the records of Devapala having "carried his arms as far as the Sindhu". Bindeshwari Prasad Sinha, an Indian archaeologist and historian states that some exaggerations are naturally present in praises like those found in the Badal Pillar inscription of Narayanapala, but it is equally unreasonable to dismiss the entire description of Devapala's conquests as mere bombast. In any case, the neighbouring Rashtrakutas and the Gurjara-Pratiharas were weak at the time and it would not be implausible to say that they were subdued by Devapala.

=== Devapala's Territorial Succession ===
His sons and grandson probably managed to keep the core area of the empire intact. However, the empire started disintegrating shortly after. Narayanapala lost control of Assam and Orissa. It was thought he also briefly lost control over Magadha and north Bengal, although it has now been debunked. Gopala III suffered serious reverses at the hands of the Chandra king, and ruled only from a part of northern Bengal. The Pala empire disintegrated into smaller kingdoms during the reign of Vigrahapala II. Mahipala recovered parts of Bengal, Bihar and up to Varansi. His successors lost east and south Bengal again. The last strong Pala ruler, Ramapala, gained control of Bengal, Bihar, Assam and parts of Orissa. By the time of Madanapala's death, the Pala kingdom was confined to parts of central and east Bihar along with northern Bengal.

== Administration ==
Main South Asian polities in 1000 CE, on the eve of the Ghaznavid invasions of the subcontinent.

The Pala rule was monarchial. The king was the centre of all power. Pala kings would adopt imperial titles like Parameshwara, Paramvattaraka, Maharajadhiraja. Pala kings appointed Prime Ministers known as Mahamantri. The Line of Garga served as the Prime Ministers of the Palas for 100 years.

- Garga
- Darvapani (or Darbhapani)
- Someshwar
- Kedarmisra
- Bhatta Guravmisra

Pala Empire was divided into separate Bhuktis (Provinces). Bhuktis were divided into Vishayas (Divisions) and Mandalas (Districts). Smaller units were Khandala, Bhaga, Avritti, Chaturaka, and Pattaka. Administration covered widespread area from the grass root level to the imperial court.

The Pala copperplates mention following administrative posts:

- Raja
- Rajanyaka
- Ranaka (possibly subordinate chiefs)
- Samanta and Mahasamanta (Vassal kings)
- Mahasandhi-vigrahika (Foreign minister)
- Duta (Head Ambassador)
- Rajasthaniya (Deputy)
- Aggaraksa (Chief guard)
- Sasthadhikrta (Tax collector)
- Chauroddharanika (Police tax)
- Shaulkaka (Trade tax)
- Dashaparadhika (Collector of penalties)
- Tarika (Toll collector for river crossings)
- Mahaksapatalika (Accountant)
- Jyesthakayastha (Dealing documents)
- Ksetrapa (Head of land use division) and Pramatr (Head of land measurements)
- Mahadandanayaka or Dharmadhikara (Chief justice)
- Mahapratihara
- Dandika
- Dandapashika
- Dandashakti (Police forces)
- Khola (Secret service).
- Agricultural posts like Gavadhakshya (Head of dairy farms)
- Chhagadhyakshya (Head of goat farms)
- Meshadyakshya (Head of sheep farms)
- Mahishadyakshya (Head of Buffalo farms) and many other like Vogpati
- Vishayapati
- Shashtadhikruta
- Dauhshashadhanika
- Nakadhyakshya

== Culture ==
=== Religion ===
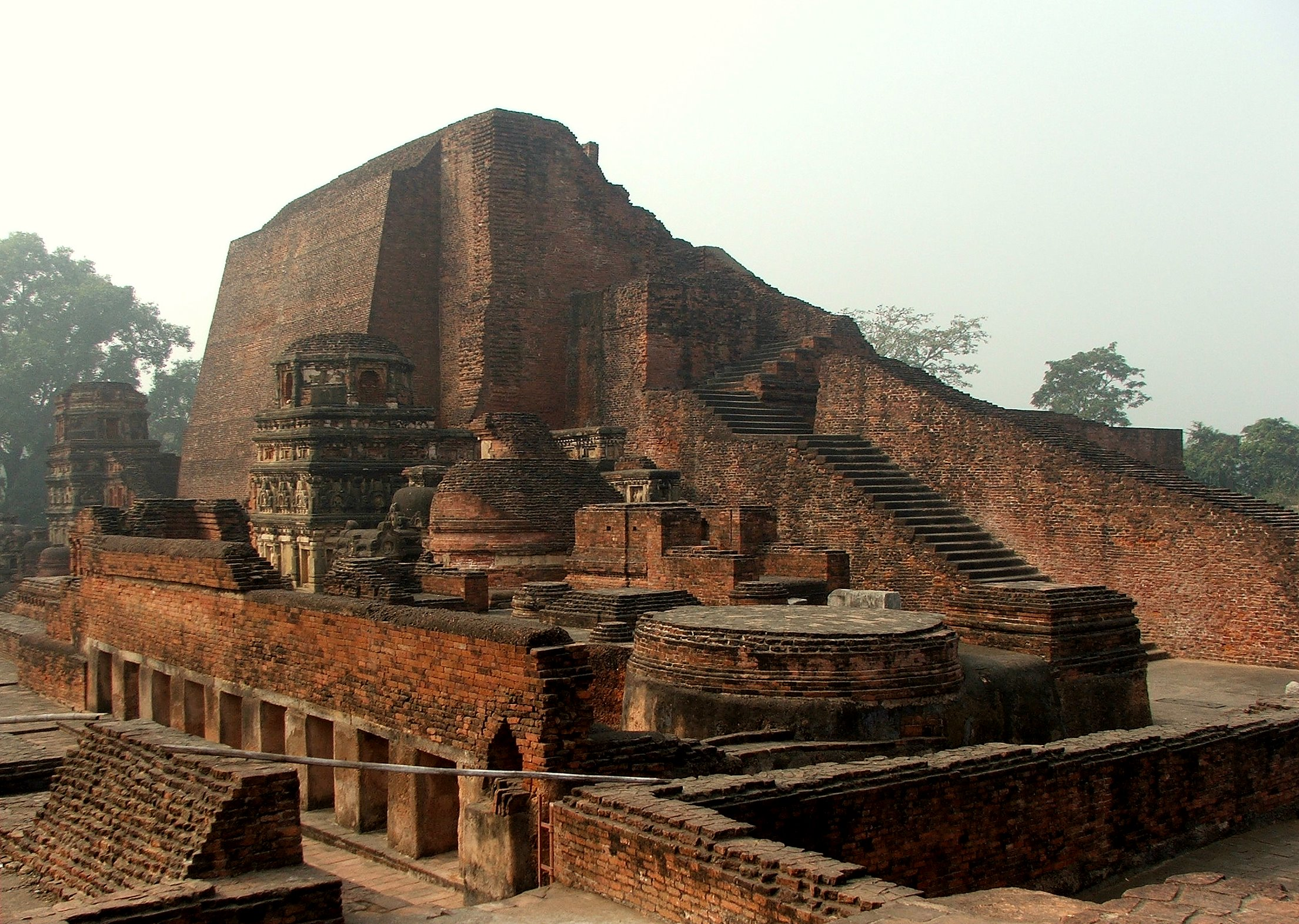
Nalanda is considered one of the first great Buddhist Mahaviras in recorded history. It reached its height under Palas.

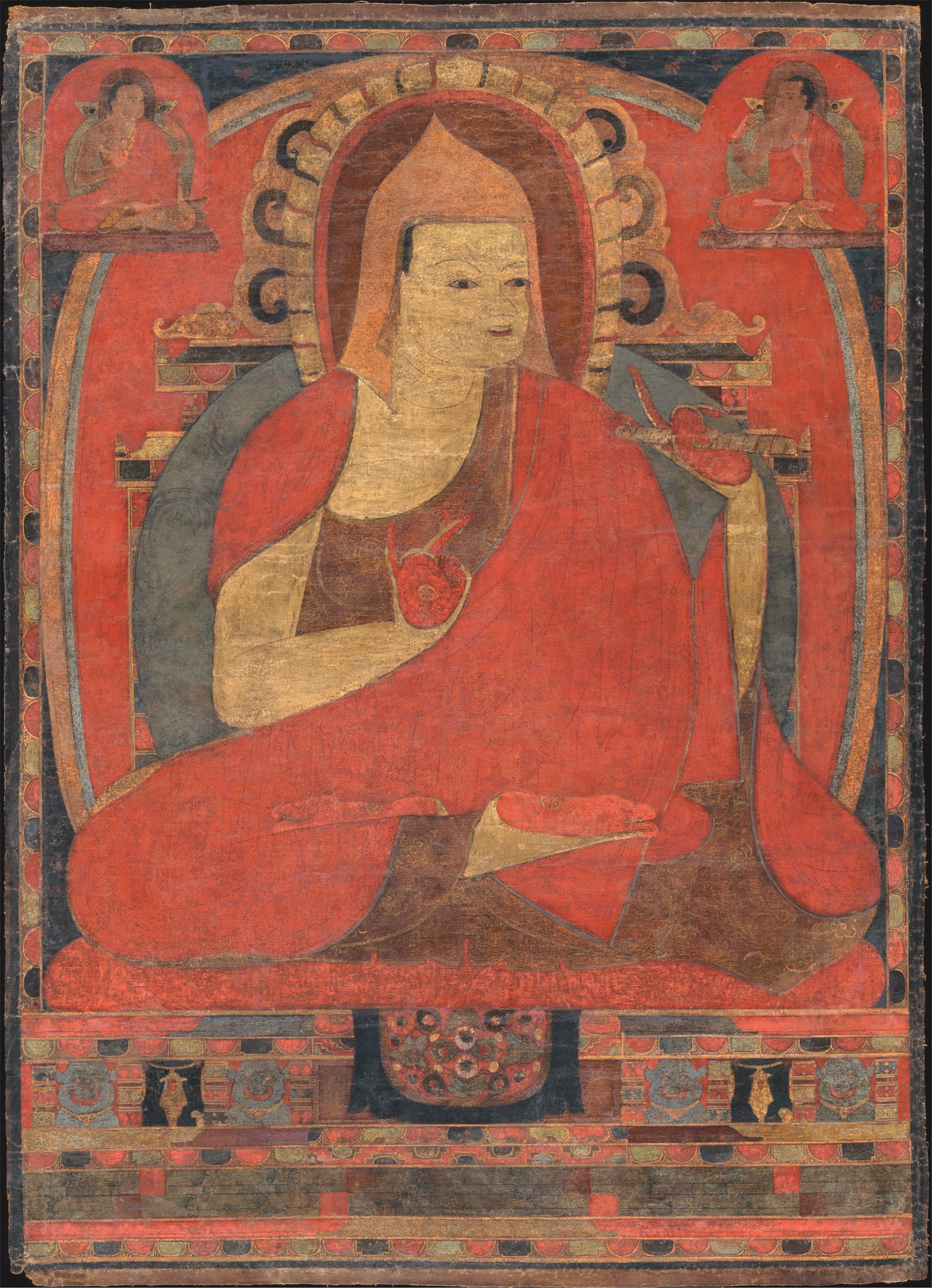
Atisha was a Buddhist teacher who helped establish the Sarma lineages of Tibetan Buddhism.

==== Buddhism ====
The Palas were patrons of Mahayana Buddhism. A few sources written much after Gopala's death mention him as a Buddhist, but it is not known if this is true. The subsequent Pala kings were definitely Buddhists. Dharmapala made the Buddhist philosopher Haribhadra his spiritual preceptor. He established the Vikramashila monastery and the Somapura Mahavihara. Taranatha also credits him with establishing 50 religious institutions and patronising the Buddhist author Haribhadra. Devapala restored and enlarged the structures at Somapura Mahavihara, which also features several themes from the epics Ramayana and Mahabharata. Mahipala I also ordered construction and repairs of several sacred structures at Saranath, Nalanda and Bodh Gaya. The Mahipala geet ("songs of Mahipala"), a set of folk songs about him, are still popular in the rural areas of Bengal.

The Palas developed the Buddhist centres of learnings, such as the Vikramashila and the Nalanda universities. Nalanda, considered one of the first great universities in recorded history, reached its height under the patronage of the Palas. Noted Buddhist scholars from the Pala period include Atisha, Santaraksita, Saraha, Tilopa, Bimalamitra, Dansheel, Dansree, Jinamitra, Jnanasrimitra, Manjughosh, Muktimitra, Padmanava, Sambhogabajra, Shantarakshit, Silabhadra, Sugatasree and Virachan.

As the rulers of Gautama Buddha's land, the Palas acquired great reputation in the Buddhist world. Balaputradeva, the Sailendra king of Java, sent an ambassador to him, asking for a grant of five villages for the construction of a monastery at Nalanda. The request was granted by Devapala. He appointed the Brahmin Viradeva (of Nagarahara, present-day Jalalabad) as the head of the Nalanda monastery. The Buddhist poet Vajradatta (the author of Lokesvarashataka), was in his court. The Buddhist scholars from the Pala empire travelled from Bengal to other regions to propagate Buddhism. Atisha, for example, preached in Tibet and Sumatra, and is seen as one of the major figures in the spread of the 11th-century Mahayana Buddhism.

==== Shaivism ====
The Palas continued to patronise Shaivism, and epigraphic evidence suggests that Mahipala I and Nayapala were initiated as Shaivites by their royal preceptors. Vigrahapala III's Amagachi inscription describes him as "devoted to Śiva worship", and this tradition continued under his successor Ramapala. Poet Sandhyakar Nandi describes Ramapala's son Madanapala as a devotee of Shiva.

The Palas supported the Saiva ascetics, typically the ones associated with the Golagi-Math. Besides the images of the Buddhist deities, the images of Vishnu, Siva and Sarasvati were also constructed during the Pala dynasty rule.

Devapala built a temple dedicated to Shiva's consort, and Mahipala patronised a Shaivite monastery. A 1026 CE inscription recording renovations of Buddhist structures at Sarnath by Pala princes states that Mahipala I had them built "hundreds" of temples of Shiva, Chitraghanta, and other deities in Varanasi.

Narayanapala's Bhagalpur inscription suggests that he built several Shiva temples, and records his grant of a village to Pashupatas. Narayanapala also attended a sacrifice by his Brahmin minister. Nayapala's Siyan inscription suggests that he built several temples dedicated to Shiva and his various aspects (such as Bhairava), plus temples dedicated to the Nine Durgas, the Mother Goddess, Vishnu, and Lakshmi. Despite this, it is unlikely that Nayapala had fully rejected Buddhist teachings, since 17-th century Tibetan writer Taranatha states that he had a Buddhist preceptor. Madanapala's queen Chitramatika, gifted land to a brahmana named Vateshvara-svami Sharma as his remuneration for reciting the Mahabharata.

=== Literature ===
The Palas patronised several Sanskrit scholars, some of whom were their officials. The Gauda riti style of composition was developed during the Pala rule. Many Buddhist Tantric works were authored and translated during the Pala rule. Besides the Buddhist scholars mentioned in the Religion section above, Jimutavahana, Sandhyakar Nandi, Madhava-kara, Suresvara and Chakrapani Datta are some of the other notable scholars from the Pala period.

The notable Pala texts on philosophy include Agama Shastra by Gaudapada, Nyaya Kundali by Sridhar Bhatta and Karmanushthan Paddhati by Bhatta Bhavadeva. The texts on medicine include

- Chikitsa Samgraha, Ayurveda Dipika, Bhanumati, Shabda Chandrika and Dravya Gunasangraha by Chakrapani Datta
- Shabda-Pradipa, Vrikkhayurveda and Lohpaddhati by Sureshwara
- Chikitsa Sarsamgraha by Vangasena
- Sushrata by Gadadhara Vaidya
- Dayabhaga, Vyavohara Matrika and Kalaviveka by Jimutavahana

Sandhyakar Nandi's semi-fictional epic Ramacharitam (12th century) is an important source of Pala history.

A form of the proto-Bengali language can be seen in the Charyapadas composed during the Pala rule.

=== Art and architecture ===
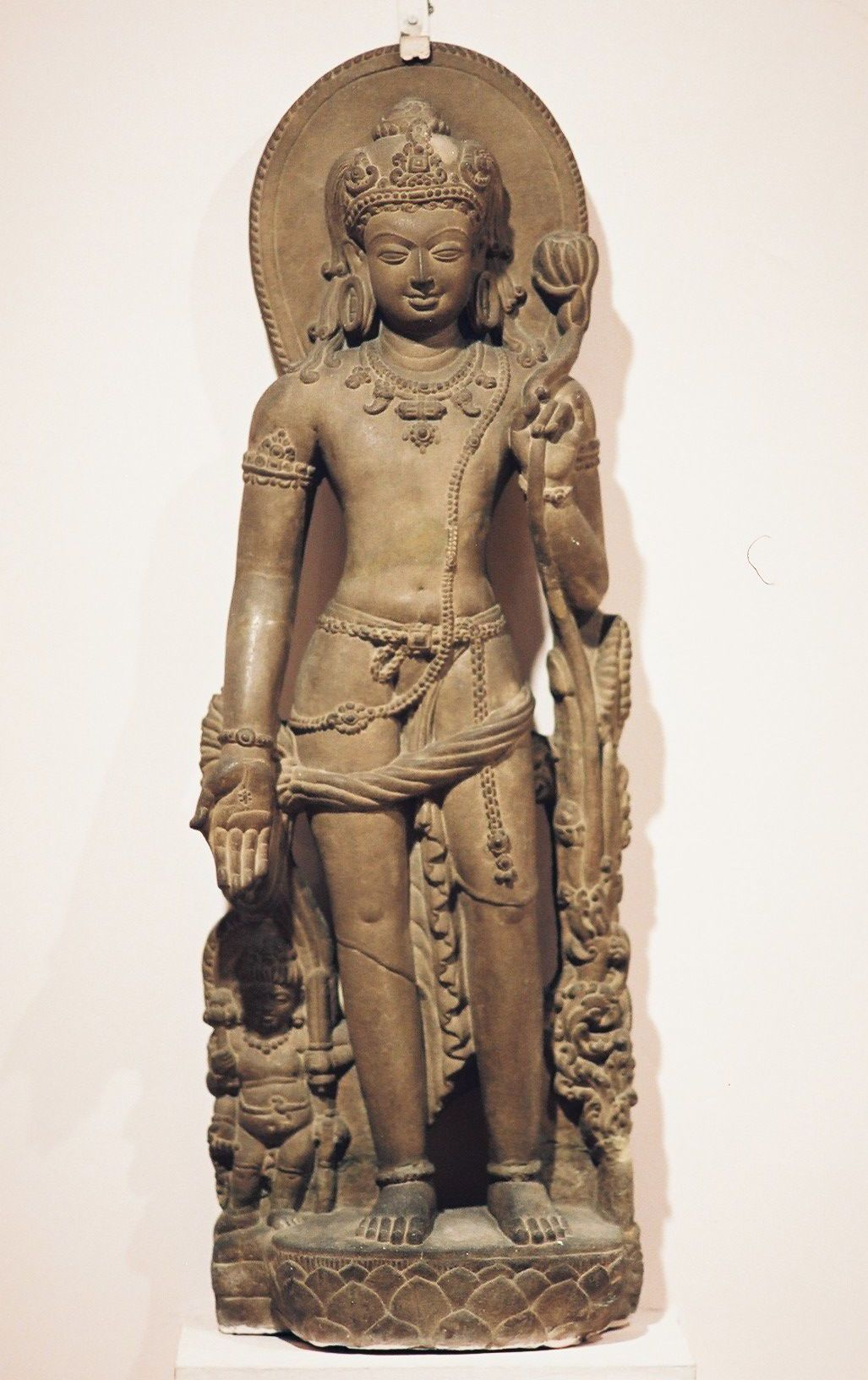
Sculpture of Khasarpana Lokesvara from Nalanda

The Pala school of sculptural art is recognised as a distinct phase of the Indian art, and is noted for the artistic genius of the Bengal sculptors. It is influenced by the Gupta art.

The Pala style was inherited and continued to develop under the Sena Empire. During this time, the style of sculpture changed from "Post-Gupta" to a distinctive style that was widely influential in other areas and later centuries. Deity figures became more rigid in posture, very often standing with straight legs close together, and figures were often heavily loaded with jewellery; they very often have multiple arms, a convention allowing them to hold many attributes and display mudras. The typical form for temple images is a slab with a main figure, rather over half life-size, in very high relief, surrounded by smaller attendant figures, who might have freer tribhanga poses. Critics have found the style tending towards over-elaboration. The quality of the carving is generally very high, with crisp, precise detail. In east India, facial features tend to become sharp.

Much larger numbers of smaller bronze groups of similar composition have survived than from previous periods. Probably the numbers produced were increasing. These were mostly made for domestic shrines of the well-off, and from monasteries. Gradually, Hindu figures come to outnumber Buddhist ones, reflecting the terminal decline of Indian Buddhism, even in east India, its last stronghold.

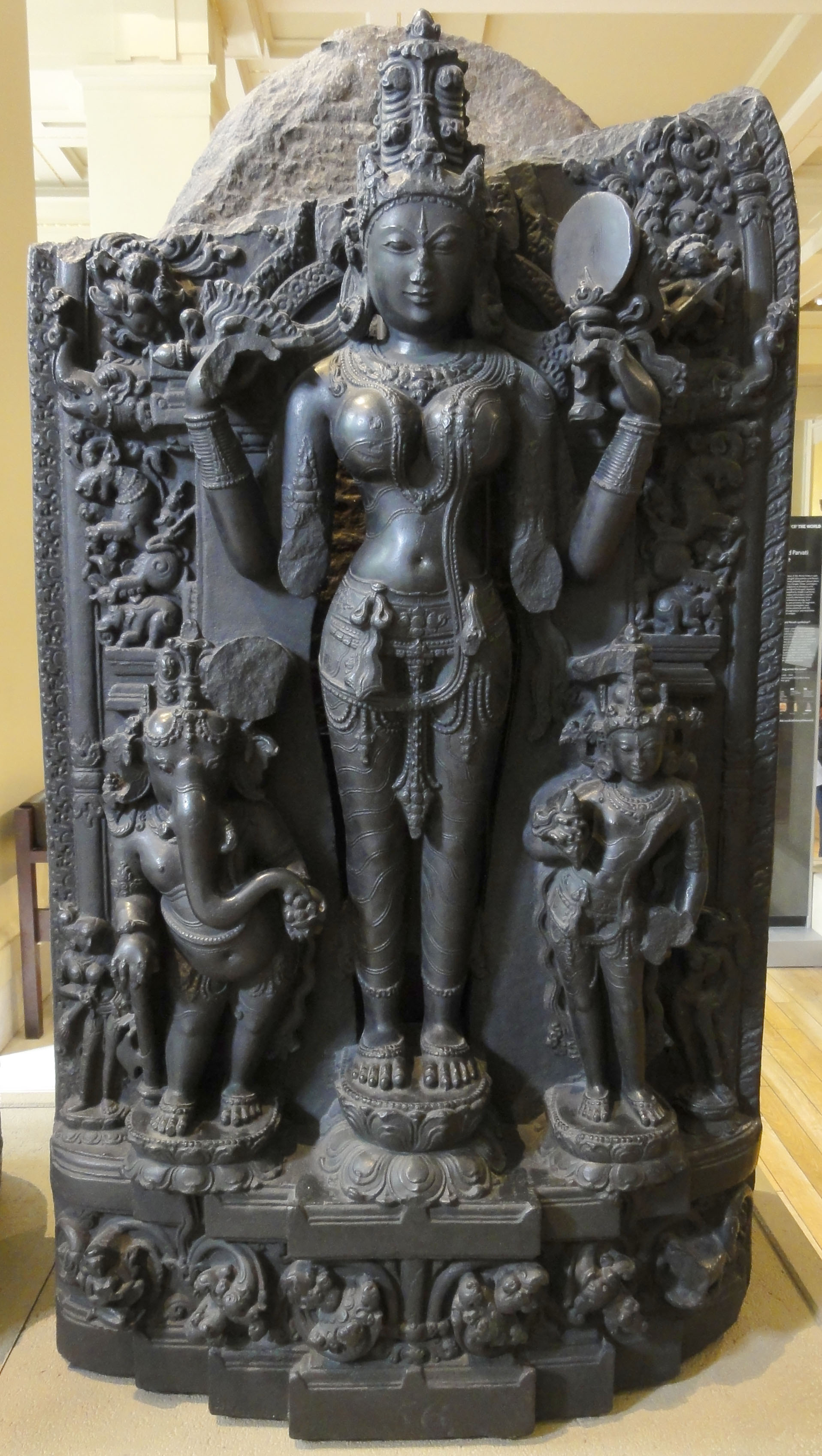
A basalt statue of Lalita flanked by Gaṇeśa and Kārttikeya

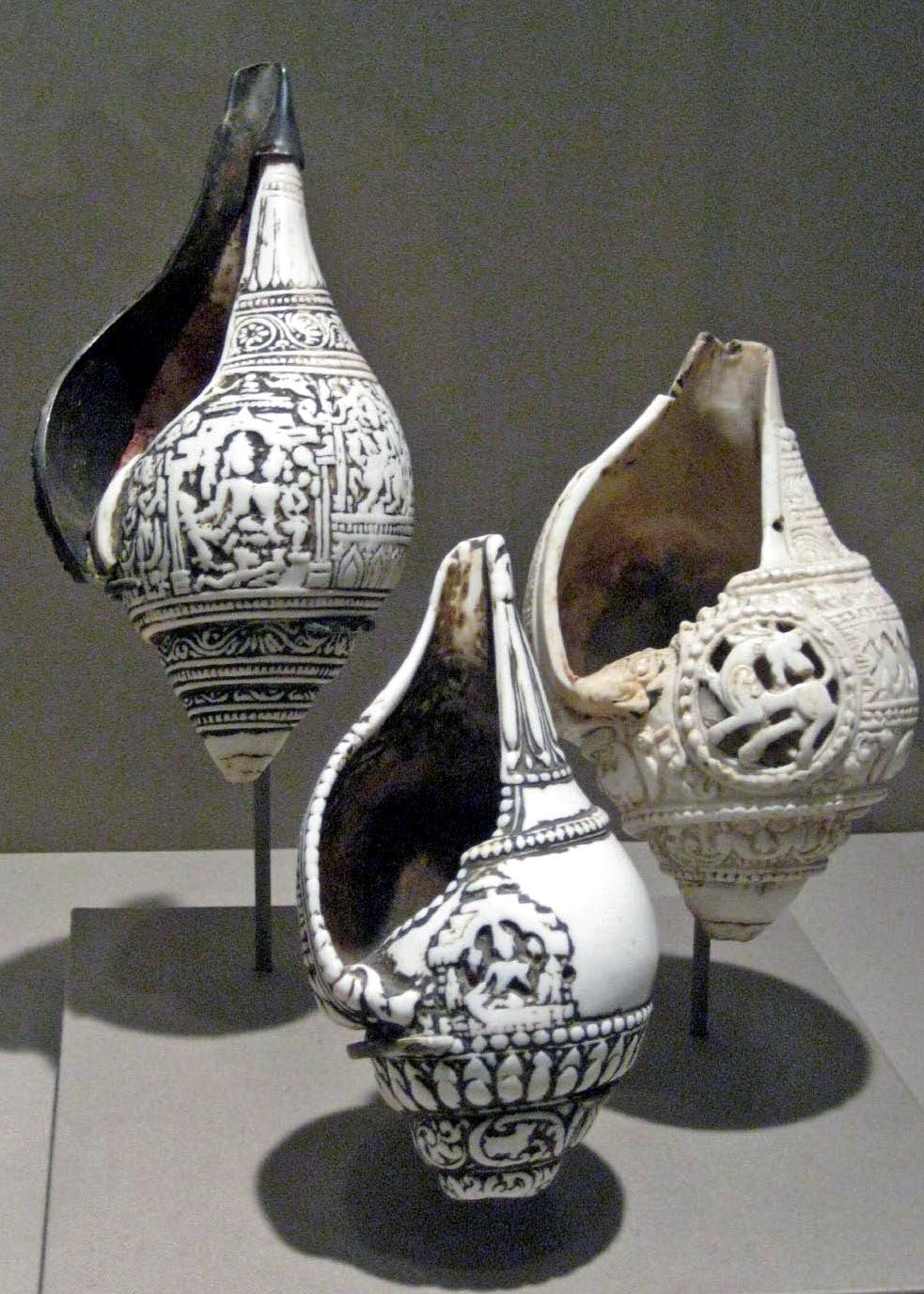
Carved shankhas

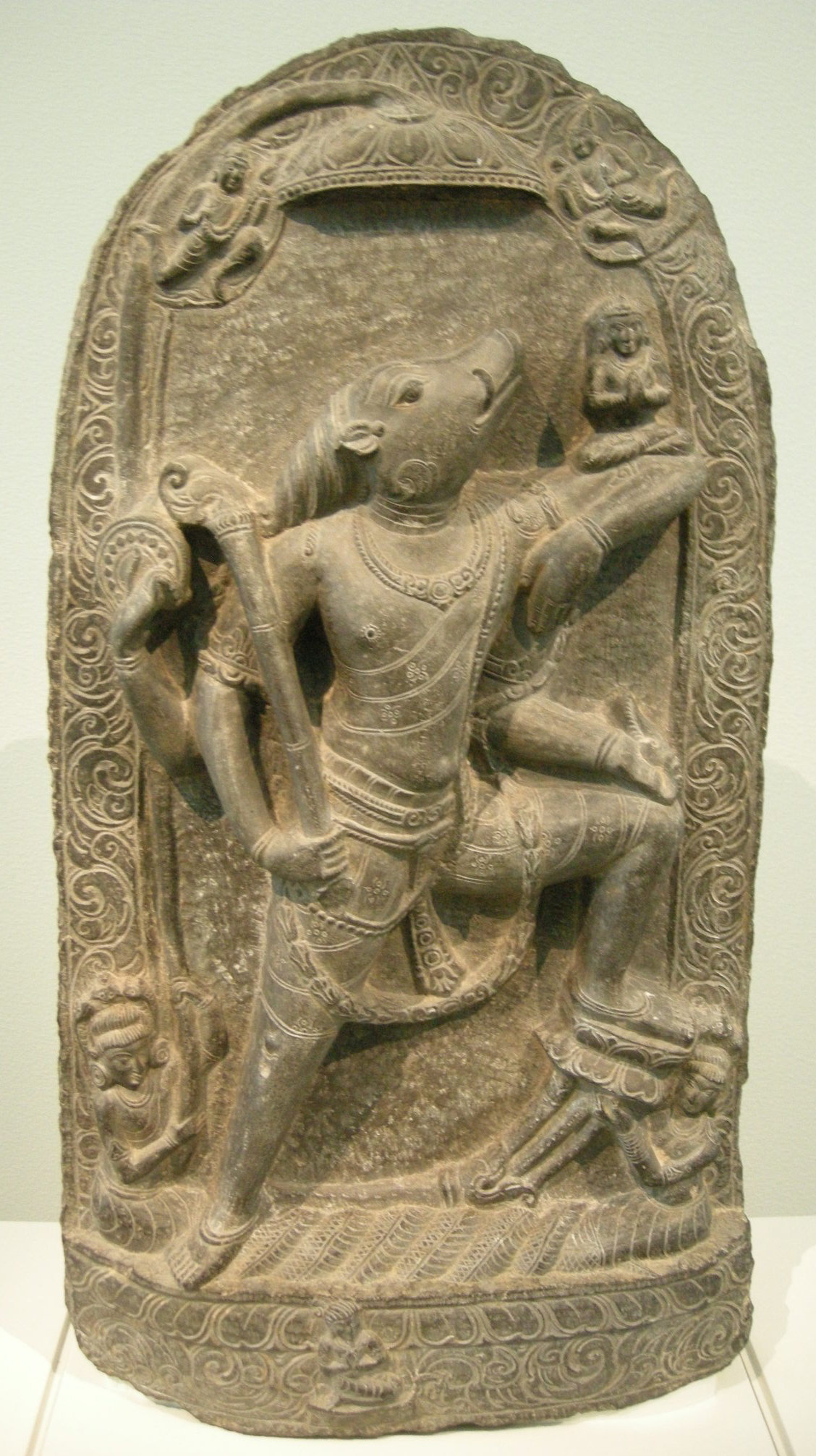
Sculpture of Varaha avatar of Lord Vishnu

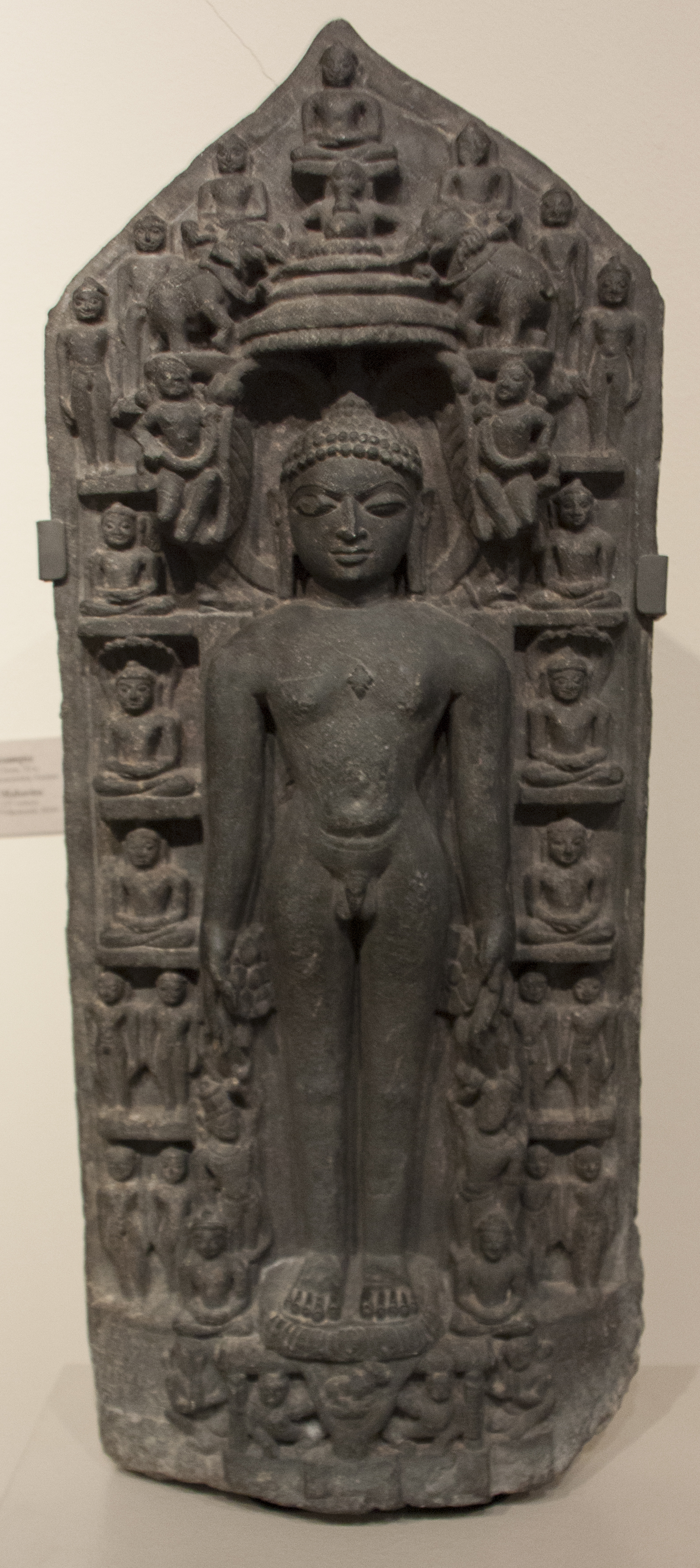
Jina Rishabhanatha

As noted earlier, the Palas built a number of monasteries and other sacred structures. The Somapura Mahavihara in present-day Bangladesh is a World Heritage Site. It is a monastery with a 21-acre (8.5 ha) complex with 177 cells, numerous stupas, temples and a number of other ancillary buildings. The gigantic structures of other Viharas, including Vikramashila, Odantapuri, and Jagaddala are the other masterpieces of the Palas. The art of Bengal and Bihar during the Pala dynasty influenced the art of Nepal, Burma, Sri Lanka and Java.

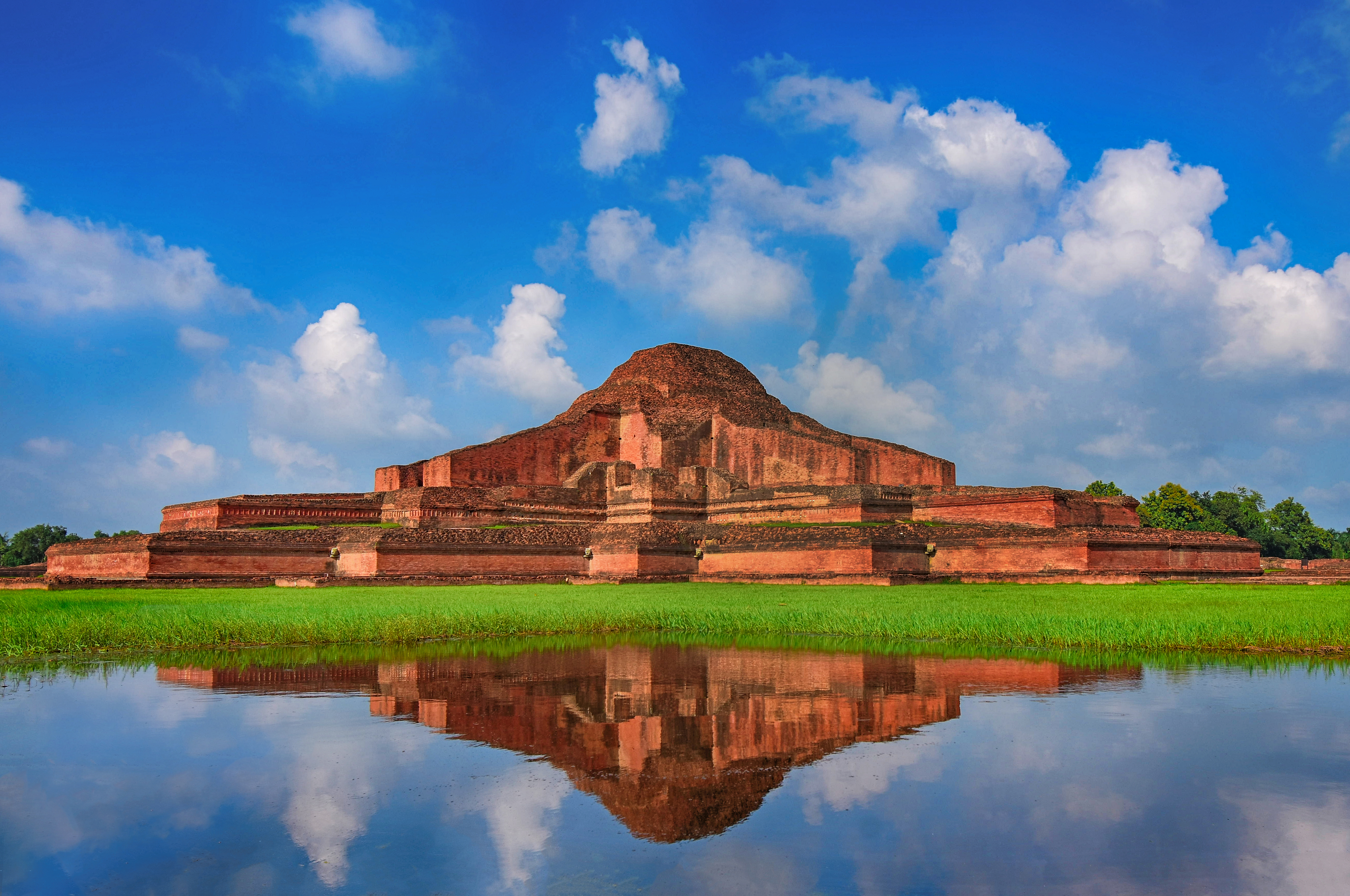
Somapura Mahavihara, a World Heritage Site, was built by Dharmapala

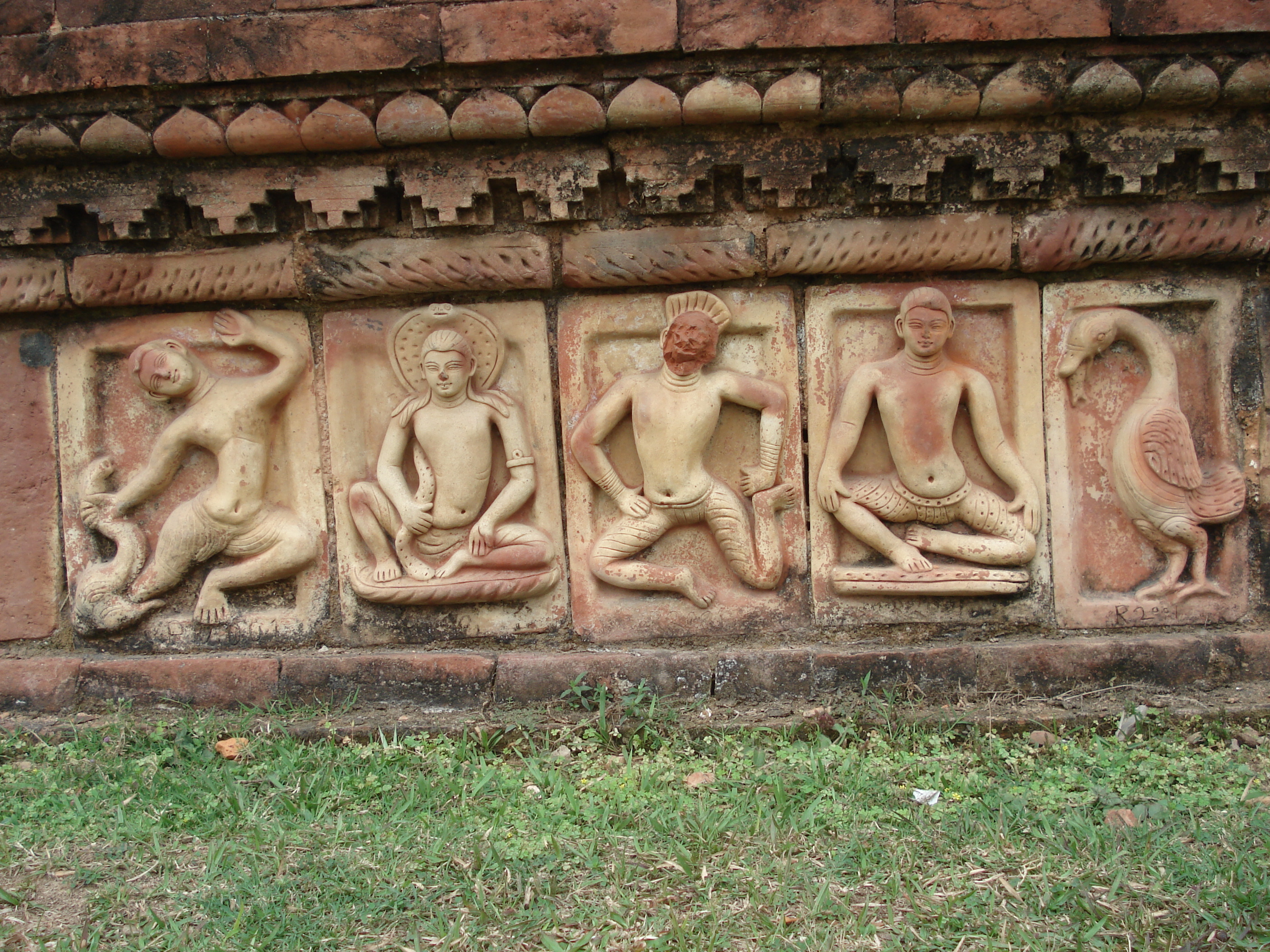
Central shrine decor at Somapura

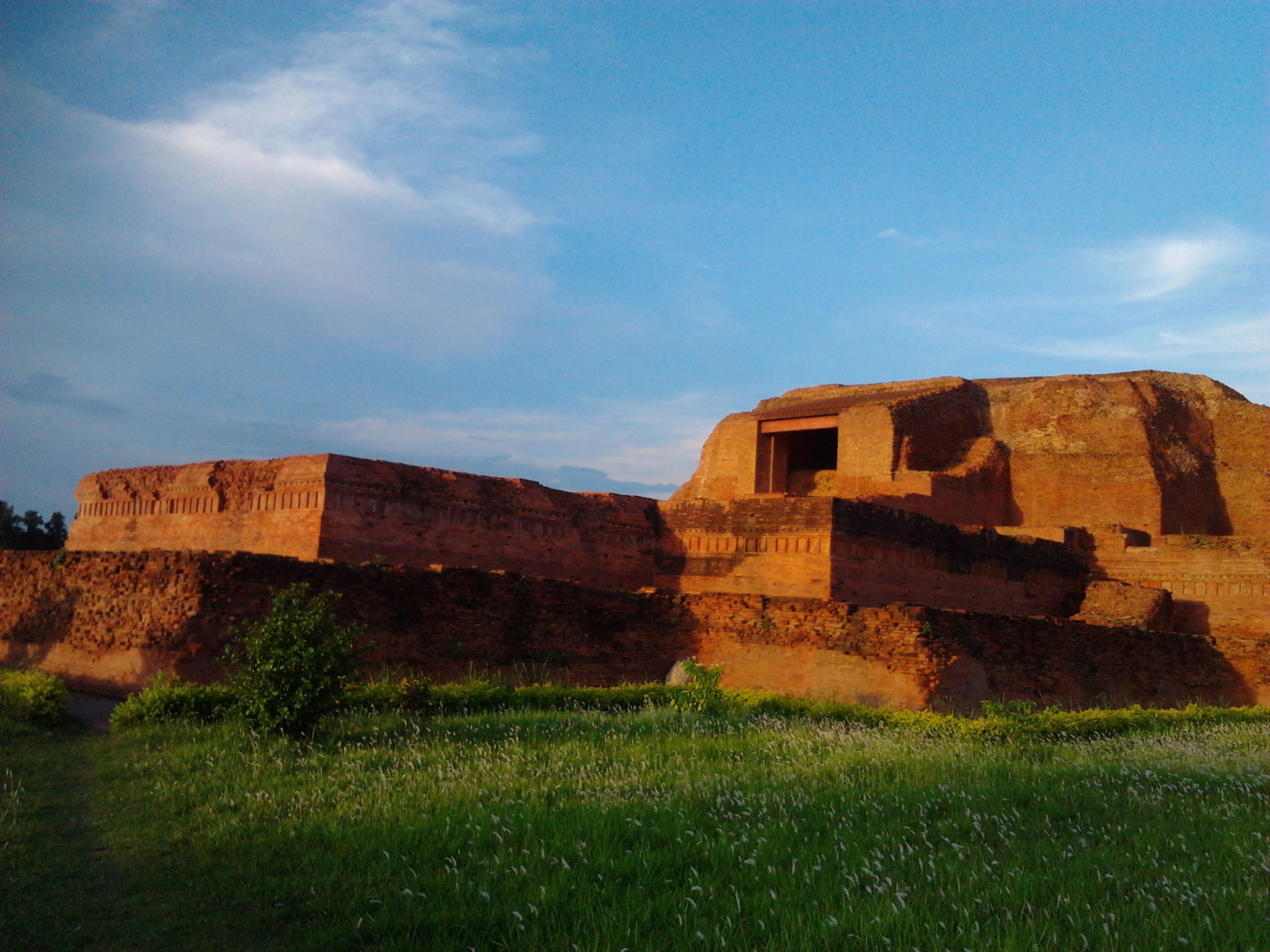
Ruins of Vikramashila

== List of Pala rulers ==
Most of the Pala inscriptions mention only the regnal year as the date of issue, without any well-known calendar era. Because of this, the chronology of the Pala kings is hard to determine. Based on their different interpretations of the various epigraphs and historical records, different historians estimate the Pala chronology as follows:

	RC Majumdar (1971)	AM Chowdhury (1967)	BP Sinha (1977)	DC Sircar (1975–76)	D. K. Ganguly (1994)
Gopala I	750–770	756–781	755–783	750–775	750–774
Dharmapala	770–810	781–821	783–820	775–812	774–806
Devapala	810–c. 850	821–861	820–860	812–850	806–845
Mahendrapala	NA (Mahendrapala's existence was conclusively established through a copper-plate charter discovered later.)				845–860
Shurapala I	Deemed to be alternate name of Vigrahapala I			850–858	860–872
Gopala II	NA (copper-plate charter discovered in 1995. Text of inscription published in 2009.)				
Vigrahapala I	850–853	861–866	860–865	858–60	872–873
Narayanapala	854–908	866–920	865–920	860–917	873–927
Rajyapala	908–940	920–952	920–952	917–952	927–959
Gopala III	940–957	952–969	952–967	952–972	959–976
Vigrahapala II	960–c. 986	969–995	967–980	972–977	976–977
Mahipala I	988–c. 1036	995–1043	980–1035	977–1027	977–1027
Nayapala	1038–1053	1043–1058	1035–1050	1027–1043	1027–1043
Vigrahapala III	1054–1072	1058–1075	1050–1076	1043–1070	1043–1070
Mahipala II	1072–1075	1075–1080	1076–1078/9	1070–1071	1070–1071
Shurapala II	1075–1077	1080–1082	1076–1078/9	1071–1072	1071–1072
Ramapala	1077–1130	1082–1124	1078/9–1132	1072–1126	1072–1126
Kumarapala	1130–1140	1124–1129	1132–1136	1126–1128	1126–1128
Gopala IV	1140–1144	1129–1143	1136–1144	1128–1143	1128–1143
Madanapala	1144–1162	1143–1162	1144–1161/62	1143–1161	1143–1161
Govindapala	1158–1162	NA	1162–1176 or 1158–1162	1161–1165	1161–1165
Palapala	NA	NA	NA	1165–1199	1165–1200

== Family tree ==
Pala dynasty

Gopala I^{(1)} r. c. 750-774
Dharmapala^{(2)} r. c. 774-806	Vakapala
Devapala^{(3)} r. c. 806-845	Jayapala
Mahendrapala^{(4)} r. c. 845-860	Shurapala I^{(5)} r. c. 860-872	Vigrahapala I^{(7)} r. c. 872-873
Gopala II^{(6)} r. c. after 872	Narayanapala^{(8)} r. c. 873-927
Rajyapala^{(9)} r. c. 927-959
Gopala III^{(10)} r. c. 959-966
Vigrahapala II^{(11)} r. c. 966-977
Mahipala^{(12)} r. c. 977-1027
Nayapala^{(13)} r. c. 1027-1043
Vigrahapala III^{(14)} r. c. 1043-1070
Mahipala II^{(15)} r. c. 1070-1076	Shurapala II^{(16)} r. c. 1076-1078	Ramapala^{(17)} r. c. 1078-1126
Kumarapala^{(18)} r. c. 1126-1128	Madanapala^{(20)} r. c. 1143-1161
Gopala IV^{(19)} r. c. 1128-1143	Govindapala^{(21)} r. c. 1161-1165

Note:

- Earlier historians believed that Vigrahapala I and Shurapala I were the two names of the same person. Now, it is known that these two were cousins; they either ruled simultaneously (perhaps over different territories) or in rapid succession.
- AM Chowdhury rejects Govindapala and his successor Palapala as the members of the imperial Pala dynasty.
- According to BP Sinha, the Gaya inscription can be read as either the "14th year of Govindapala's reign" or "14th year after Govindapala's reign". Thus, two sets of dates are possible.
- D.K. Ganguly mentions another ruler named Indradumnyapala, who is solely known from local tradition. There is no source of his existence yet.
- A king, Bhimapala also finds a mention in the Sabdapradipa. Rajat Sanyal argues that if Govindapala and Palapala are indeed accepted as Pala kings, Bhimapala also should be, provided that he was chronologically close to Ramapala according to the wording of the text. However, both need more historical evidence.
- A king named Gomindrapala finds mention in a manuscript, dated his fourth regnal year. R.C. Majumdar identifies him with Govindapala, while S.K. Saraswati suggests he is a later Pala king.

== Military ==
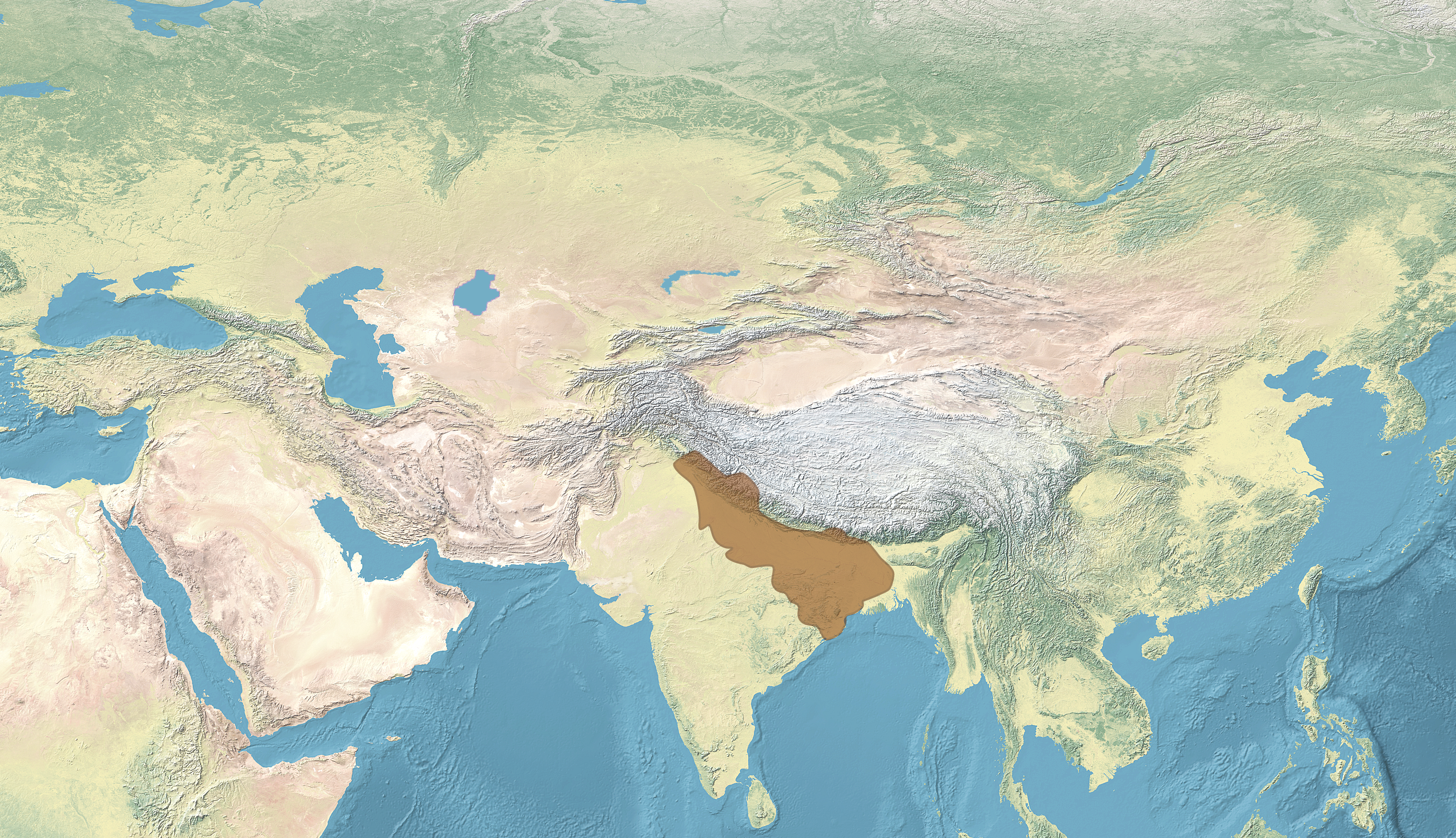
The Pala Empire and contemporary polities c. 800.

The highest military officer in the Pala empire was the Mahasenapati (commander-in-chief). The Palas recruited mercenary soldiers from a number of kingdoms, including Malava, Khasa, Huna, Kulika, Mithila, Karnata, Lata, Odra and Manahali. According to the contemporary accounts, the Rashtrakutas had the best infantry, the Gurjara-Pratiharas had the finest cavalry and the Palas had the largest elephant force. The Arab merchant Sulaiman states that the Palas had an army bigger than those of the Balhara (possibly the Rashtrakutas) and the king of Jurz (possibly the Gurjara-Pratiharas). He also states that the Pala army employed 10,000–15,000 men for fuelling and washing clothes. He further claims that during the battles, the Pala king would lead 50,000 war elephants. Sulaiman's accounts seem to be based on exaggerated reports; Ibn Khaldun mentions the number of elephants as 5,000.

Since Bengal did not have a good native breed of horses, the Palas imported their cavalry horses from the foreigners, including the Kambojas. They also had a navy, used for both mercantile and defence purposes.

== See also ==
- Middle kingdoms of India
- Nalanda
- Vikramashila
- Somapura Mahavihara
- Jagaddala Mahavihara
- Odantapuri
- Kurkihar hoard

== Sources ==
The main sources of information about the Pala Empire include:

Pala accounts

- Various epigraphs, coins, sculptures and architecture
- Ramacharita, a Sanskrit work by Abhinanda (9th century)
- Ramacharitam, a Sanskrit epic by Sandhyakar Nandi (12th century)
- Subhasita Ratnakosa, a Sanskrit compilation by Vidyakara (towards the end of the Pala rule)

Other accounts

- Silsiltut-Tauarikh by the Arab merchant Suleiman (851 CE), who referred to the Pala kingdom as Ruhmi or Rahma
- Dpal dus khyi 'khor lo'i chos bskor gyi byung khungs nyer mkh (History of Buddhism in India) by Taranatha (1608), contains a few traditional legends and hearsays about the Pala rule
- Ain-i-Akbari by Abu'l-Fazl (16th-century)
