= Vigrahapala II =

Pala Emperor
- Reign: 973–978 CE
- Predecessor: Gopala III
- Successor: Mahipala
- Issue: Mahipala
- Dynasty: Pala
- Father: Gopala III
- Religion: Buddhism

Vigrahapala II (r. c. 973–978 CE) was the successor to the Pala king Gopala III in the Bengal region of the Indian subcontinent, and tenth ruler of the Pala line reigning for at least five years. He was succeeded by the famed Mahipala.

== Reign ==
During his reign, the Pala Empire was reduced to Bihar and North Bengal. From the east of Bengal, the Chandra king, Kalyanachandra conquered the Kamboja capital in Gauda as well as Kamarupa, although Vigrahapala was able to maintain his control over eastern and southern Bihar and Northern Bengal. These conquests were a fatal blow which severely weakened the Pala Empire, laying the groundwork for the Pala resurgence under his successor, Mahipala.

== See also ==
- List of rulers of Bengal
