= Nayapala =

Pala emperor from 1026 to 1041

Pala Emperor
- Reign: 1026–1041 CE
- Predecessor: Mahipala
- Successor: Vigrahapala III
- Spouse: Uddaka (likely)
- Issue: Vigrahapala III
- Dynasty: Pala
- Father: Mahipala
- Religion: Hinduism (Shaivism)

Nayapala (ruled 1026–1041) is the name of twelfth ruler of the Pala dynasty of eastern Indian subcontinent, mainly the Bengal and Bihar regions. Nayapala, the son of Mahipala I, defeated the Kalachuri king Karna after a long struggle. The two later signed a peace treaty at the mediation of the Buddhist scholar Atiśa.

Nayapala's Siyan inscription suggests that he built several temples dedicated to Shiva and his various aspects (such as Bhairava), plus temples dedicated to the Nine Durgas, the Mother Goddess, Vishnu, and Lakshmi.

== See also ==
- List of rulers of Bengal
