= History of the Mithila region =

History of a region in the Indian subcontinent

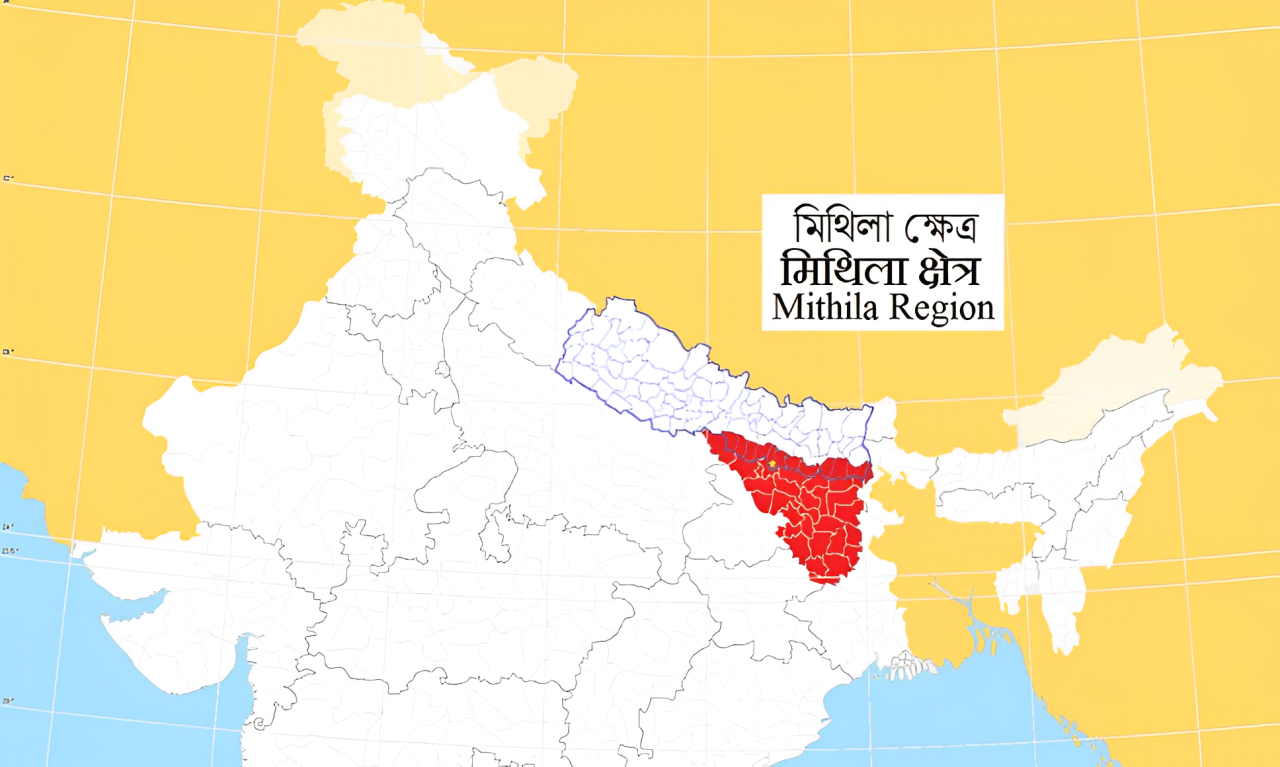
Map of the Mithila region of India & Nepal

Part of a series on the
History of Bihar
Ancient History
Prehistoric and Vedic Era

- Chirand (Neolithic) - Vedic period - Videha - Mithila (ancient) - Anga - Kikata

Urbanisation and Shramana

- Second Urbanisation - Rise of Shramana - Buddhism • Jainism • Ajivika

Gaṇasaṅghas

- Magadha - Vajjika League

  - Nāya
  - Vajji (tribe)
  - Licchavis of Vaishali

- Malla (tribe) - Kashi - Bulis

Imperial Magadha

- Brihadratha dynasty - Haryanka dynasty

  - Bimbisara
  - Ajatashatru

- Shishunaga dynasty - Nanda Empire

  - Mahapadma Nanda

- Maurya Empire

  - Chandragupta Maurya
  - Ashoka
Post-Mauryan and Smriti

- Shunga Empire

  - Pushyamitra Shunga

- Kanva dynasty - Development of Smriti - Brahmanical Revival

The Interregnum

- Kushan Influence - Mitra Dynasty - Resurgence of Licchavis

Classical and medieval
The Classical Age

- Gupta Empire

Early Medieval

- Later Gupta dynasty - Maukharis

Pala Era and Feudatories

- Pala Empire - Khayaravala dynasty - Pithipatis of Magadha

Medieval Mithila

- Karnats of Mithila - Oiniwar dynasty

Islamic Incursions

- Delhi Sultanate

Centers of Learning

- Nalanda - Vikramashila - Odantapuri - Telhara monastery

Early-modern
Afghan and Mughal Rule

- Sur Empire

  - Sher Shah Suri

- Mughal Empire

  - Bihar Subah
Regional Chieftaincies

- Chakwars - Chero dynasty - Gidhaur chieftaincy - Kharagpur Raj - Khokhra chieftaincy

Major Zamindari Estates

- Bettiah Raj - Khandavala dynasty - Dumraon Raj - Hathwa Raj - Jagdishpur estate

Colonial & Independence Era
Colonial Rule (1764–1947)

- Battle of Buxar (1764) - East India Company - Permanent Settlement (1793) - Santhal rebellion - Indian Rebellion of 1857

  - Kunwar Singh

- Bihar famine of 1873–74 - Bihar Province (Est. 1912) - 1934 Nepal–Bihar earthquake

Freedom Struggle

- Champaran Satyagraha (1917) - Salt Satyagraha - Bihar Vidyapeeth - Kisan Sabha

  - Swami Sahajanand Saraswati

- Quit India Movement

  - Azad Dasta
Modern Era (Post-1947)
Congress Era (1947–1967)

- Sri Krishna Sinha - Anugrah Narayan Sinha - Zamindari Abolition

Socialist and JP Era (1967–1989)

- Karpoori Thakur - Bihar Movement (1974) - Jayaprakash Narayan - Bhagalpur riots (1989)

RJD Era (1990–2005)

- Lalu Prasad Yadav - Rabri Devi - Fodder Scam

State Division (2000)

- Bihar Reorganisation Act, 2000 - Creation of Jharkhand

NDA Era (2005–Present)

- Nitish Kumar - Politics of Bihar

Culture, art, and society
Art and architecture

- Mahabodhi Temple - Nalanda - Barabar Caves - Tomb of Sher Shah Suri - Rohtas Fort - Golghar - Mithila Painting - Patna Qalam - Manjusha Art - Didarganj Yakshi

Society and language

- Bihari culture - Mithila • Magadh • Anga - Bihari languages

  - Maithili • Magahi
  - Bhojpuri • Angika
Religion

- Religion in Bihar - Buddhism in Bihar - Jainism in Bihar - Islam in Bihar - Sikhism in Bihar

Portal India Portal Bihar

Mithila (IAST: mithilā, also known as Mithilanchal, Tirhut and Tirabhukti) is a geographical and cultural region located in the Indian subcontinent. The native language is known as Maithili and its speakers are referred to as Maithils. The majority of the Mithila region falls within modern-day India. Mithila is bounded in the north by the Himalayas, and in the south, west and east by the Ganges, Gandaki and Mahananda respectively. It extends into the southeastern Terai of Nepal. This region was also called Tirabhukti, the ancient name of Tirhut.

== Names ==
Historically, the region was called by multiple names. The name Mithila is believed to be derived from the legendary King Mithi who established Mithilapuri.

Among the twelve names of Mithila, including Tirhut and Tirabhukti, Brihada Vishnu Purana mentions the name Tirabhukti, which later became known as Tirhut in common use. Tirabhukti is a Sanskrit compound word, a combination of tira ("shore") and bhukti (in the meaning of "limit"). The name Tirhut is preserved in Tirhuta script of the Maithili language, Tirhut style of temples architecture and Tirhut division in the Mithila region

Vijayakanta Mishra, an Indian scholar, in his book "Cultural Heritage of Mithila" stated that the word Tirabhukti which is mentioned in the text of Brihada Vishnu Purana became popular during the period of 4th- th centuries AD in the Indian subcontinent to denote the Mithila region. Later, the word Tirhut became common designation of the Mithila region for the administrative purposes.

== In Jainism ==
Mithilā is one of the most significant pilgrimage sites in Jainism. Apart from its association with Mahavira, the 24th Tirthankara, it is also known for its association with Mallinatha, the 19th Tirthankara, and Naminatha, the 21st Tirthankara. As per the Śvetāmbara canon, the first four of the five significant events of the life of Mallinātha and Naminātha happened at Mithilā. The fifth one, which is the attainment of nirvana, happened at Sammet Shikharji.

Mahavira spent 6 varshās (monsoon seasons) at Mithilā. Akampita Swāmi, one of his 11 ganadharas, was born in Mithilā. Additionally, as per ancient Śvetāmbara texts, a branch of ancient Jaina ascetics was known as "Maithiliya" after Mithilā, signifying its historical importance as a center of Jaina scholarship.

Vividha Tirtha Kalpa, a 14th century CE Śvetāmbara Jaina text by Ācārya Jinaprabhasūrī, describes Mithilā as a major Jaina pilgrimage center. The scripture locates Mithilā in the Tirhuta region near the confluence of the Bāna Gangā and Gandaki rivers. It also mentions a village called "Jagai", where temples dedicated to Mallinātha and Naminātha existed. The site is also connected to Sita's marriage, "Sakulla Kunda". Some researchers suggest that "Jagai" may be an abbreviation of Jagadishpur, near present-day Sitamarhi. In their pilgrimage parties of 17th century CE and 18th century CE respectively, Panyās Saubhāgyavijaya and Panyās Vijayasāgara mention the location of the Jaina pilgrimage of Mithilā near present-day Sitamarhi in Bihar.

The temples fell into disrepair, possibly due to a lack of Jaina population. The only remnant was the footprints of Mallinātha and Naminātha. These footprints were later preserved in Bhāgalpur. Based on historical evidence and research, initiatives to restore Mithilā’s lost Jaina heritage were launched. A two-storey temple along the Sitamarhi-Dumra road was constructed. In 2015, the foundation was laid by Ācārya Mahendrasāgarasūrī of Kharatara Gaccha. In 2020, the ritualistic installation of idols was conducted by Ācārya Piyushsāgarasūrī of Kharatara Gaccha and Ācārya Vinayasāgarasūrī of Tapa Gaccha.

== Ancient history ==
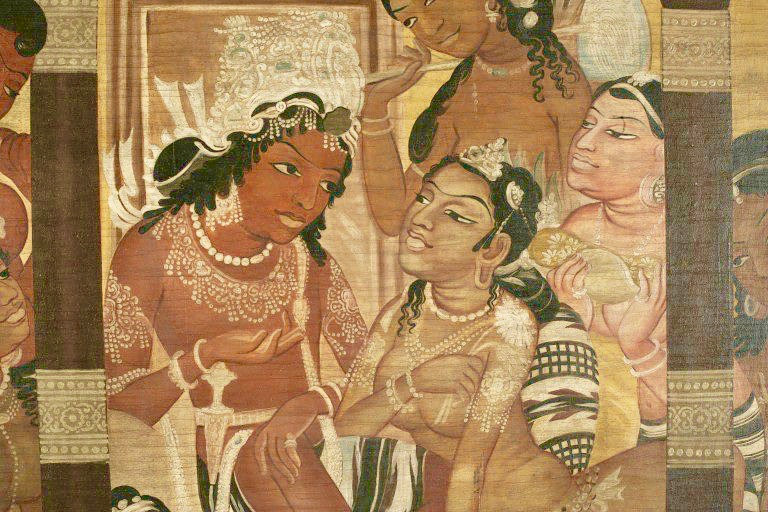
King Janaka of Videha announcing to his wife that he intends to renounce his worldly life. Scene depicted in Cave 1, Ajanta.

King Mithi established Mithilapuri. Since he was born out of the body of his father, he was called Janaka.

After this, the later kings of Mithila adopted the title Janaka. The most famous Janaka was Seeradhwaja Janaka, father of Sita. There were 52 kings in the dynasty of Janaka.

The region was also known as Videha. The kingdom of Videha is mentioned for the first time in Yajurveda Samhita. Mithila, is mentioned in Buddhist Jatakas, the Brahamanas, the Puranas (described in detail in Brhadvisnu Purana) and various epics such as the Ramayana and the Mahabharata.

However, before that, according to the Shatapatha Brahmana, a chieftain named Videgha Mathava migrated from the Saraswati Valley to Mithila during the Vedic period and established the Videha kingdom and the Maithil Brahmin community.

A list of kings is mentioned in Mahabharata and Jatakas. All the kings either adopted the title Videha or Janaka.

== Vedic period, Videha Kingdom ==
During the Vedic period, Mithila was known as the Videha kingdom.

== c. 600 BCE–c. 300 BCE, Vajji Mahajanapada ==
Following the fall of the Videhas, Mithila came under the control of the Vajjika League which was a confederacy of clans the most famous of which was the Licchavi. Mithila being one the part of Vajji which was eventually conquered by the king of Magadha, Ajatashatru.

== 6th century to 11th century: Pala ==
Mithila was a tributary state of the Pala Empire until the empire disintegrated in the 12th century.

== 11th century to 14th century: Karnata Dynasty ==
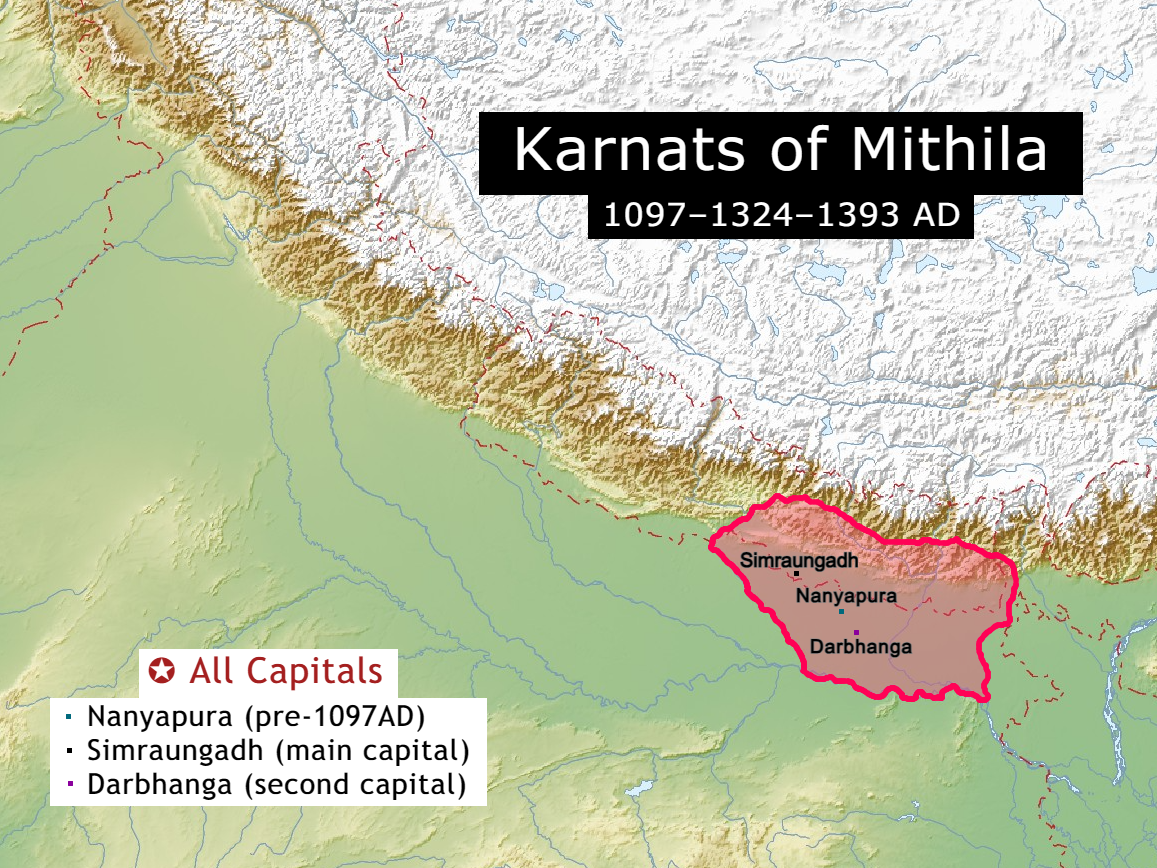
Map of the Karnats of Mithila based on combined total land area ever conquered by the rulers of Karnata Dynasty (1097–1324-1393 AD).

The Karnata dynasty was founded by Nanyadeva with the capital being in Simraungadh & Darbhanga in Mithila.

Karnats carried out raids into Nepal with the army under the leadership of the prominent general and minister Caṇḍeśvara Ṭhakkura and defeated the Tughlaq army in the Battle of Makwanpur

Caṇḍeśvara Ṭhakkura as leading a successful military expedition to Nepal where he is said to have distributed gold equal in weight to himself on the banks of the Bagmati River in 1314

In the court of Harisimhadeva, the Royal Minister was Jyotirishwar, the author of Varna Ratnakar. Upon Ghiyasuddin Tughlak's invasion of Mithila (Tirhut), King Harisimhadeva, along with many Maithils, came to Nepal and founded a new dynasty in Nepal.

The dynasty had six kings of note:

- Nanyadeva apart from being a great warrior, also had a keen interest in music. He classified and analyzed the Ragas and opines Madhya Laya is chosen for Hasya (humorous) and Sringar (libido) rasa, Bilambit is chosen for Karun (compassion) rasa and Drut is chosen for Veer (brave), Rodra (anger), Adbhut (marvellous) and Bhayanak (fearful) rasas. He wrote a treaty on music 'Saraswati Hridayalankar' which is preserved in the Bhandarkar Research Institute of Pune. Nanya Dev is also considered to be the "forgotten King of Mithila".
- Gangadeva
- Narasimhadeva
- Ramasimhadeva
- Shaktisimhadeva
- Harisimhadeva was instrumental in initiating and implementing Panji Vyavastha or Panji Prabandha in Mithila. He was also a great patron of Maithili art and literature.

== 14th to 16th century: Oiniwar Dynasty ==
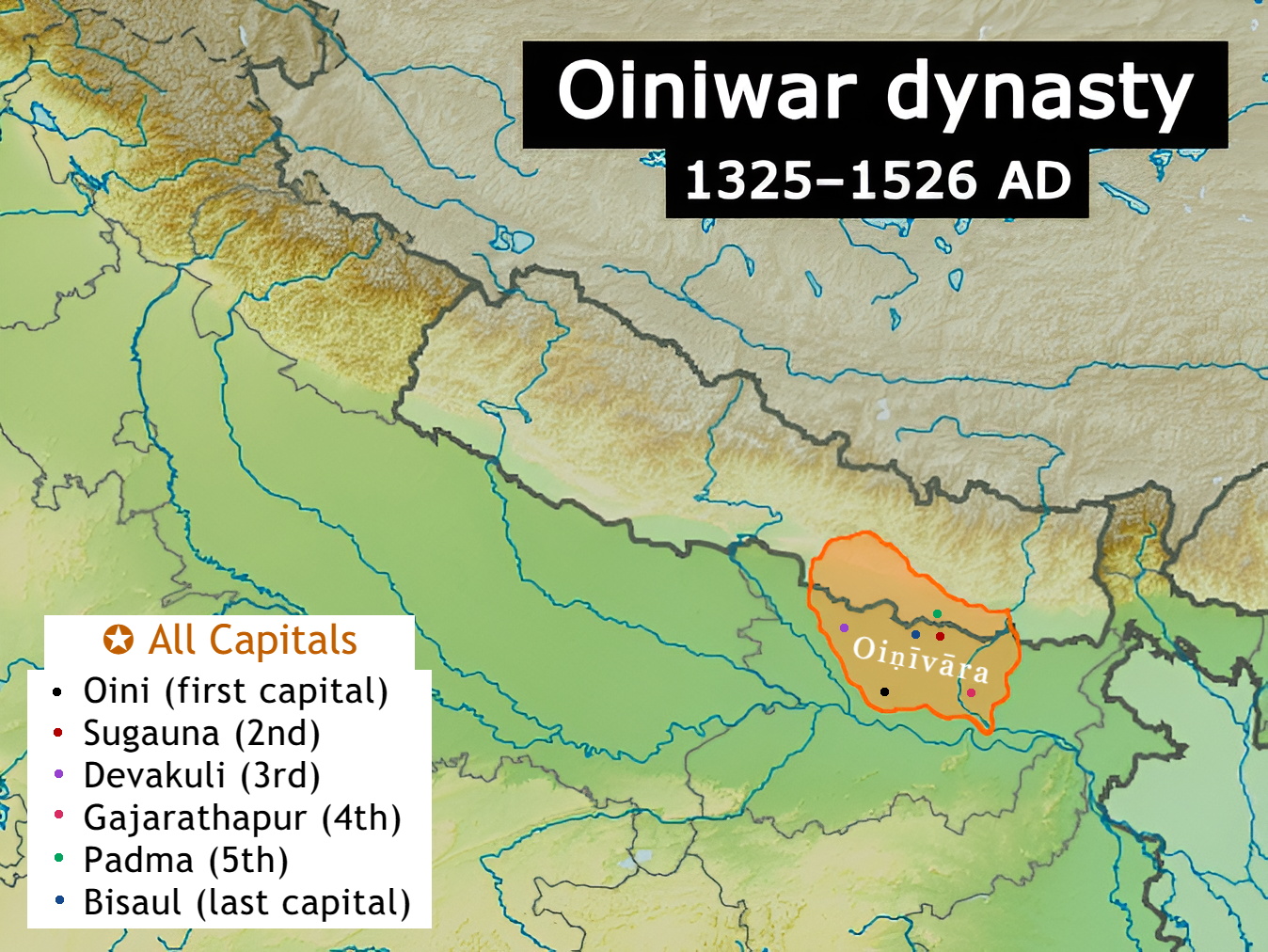
Map of the Oiniwar dynasty based on combined total land area ever conquered by the rulers of Oiṇīvāra dynasty (1325–1526 AD).

In 1325, following the collapse of the Karnat dynasty in 1324, Nath Thakur became the Maithil Brahamin ruler. The dynasty that followed him was called Oiniwar Dynasty, a Maithil Brahmin dynasty which comprised a further 20 rulers.

Unlike the Karnats who preceded them, who kept the large citadel of Simraungadh as their capital, the Oiniwars mainly operated out of various villages in Mithila.

The dynastic capitals were also frequently relocated. At some unknown time, it was moved from Oini to the village of Sugauna in modern-day Madhubani district, thus giving rise to the rulers also being known as the Sugauna Dynasty. It was moved again, to Devakuli, during the reign of Devasimha, and then to Gajarathpura (also known as Shiva Singhpura) during the early years of the reign of his son, Shivasimha. When the latter died in 1416, his queen, Lakhimadevi, governed for 12 years and then was succeeded by his brother, Padmasimha, who moved the capital once more to Padma, named after its founder, this was near to Rajnagar and a long way from the previous seat. Padmasimha, who ruled for three years, was succeeded by his wife, Vishwasa Devi, and she, too, founded a new capital which is today the village of Vishual.

== 16th century to 20th century : Raj Darbhanga ==
Another Maithil Brahmin dynasty. The Khandwala dynasty ruled as the Raj Darbhanga, beginning with Mahesh Thakur, who died in 1558. The last ruler was Kameshwar Singh, whose reign from 1929 came to an end in 1947 with the independence of India, when all the princely states got merged with the Union of India.

== See also ==
- Ancient Mithila University
- Mithila State Movement
- Industrial ruins in Mithila region
- Raj Banauli
- Mithila Vishwavidyalaya Panchang

== Sources ==
- Monier-Williams, M. (1872). "tira". A Sanskṛit-English Dictionary Etymologically and Philologically Arranged: With Special Reference to Greek, Latin, Gothic, German, Anglo-Saxon, and Other Cognate Indo-European Languages. Clarendon Press.
