= Chinnamasta Bhagawati Temple =

Hindu temple in Nepal

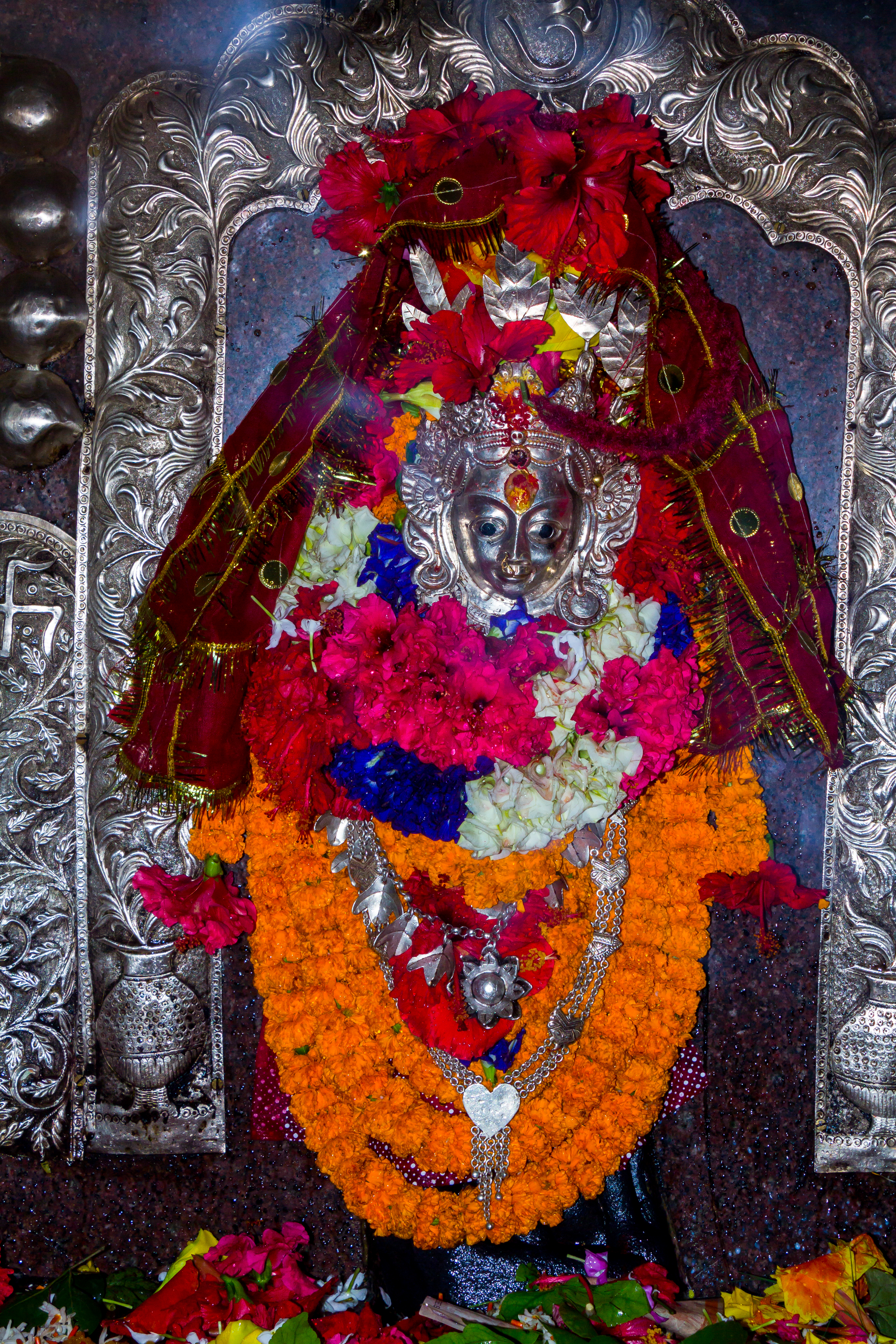
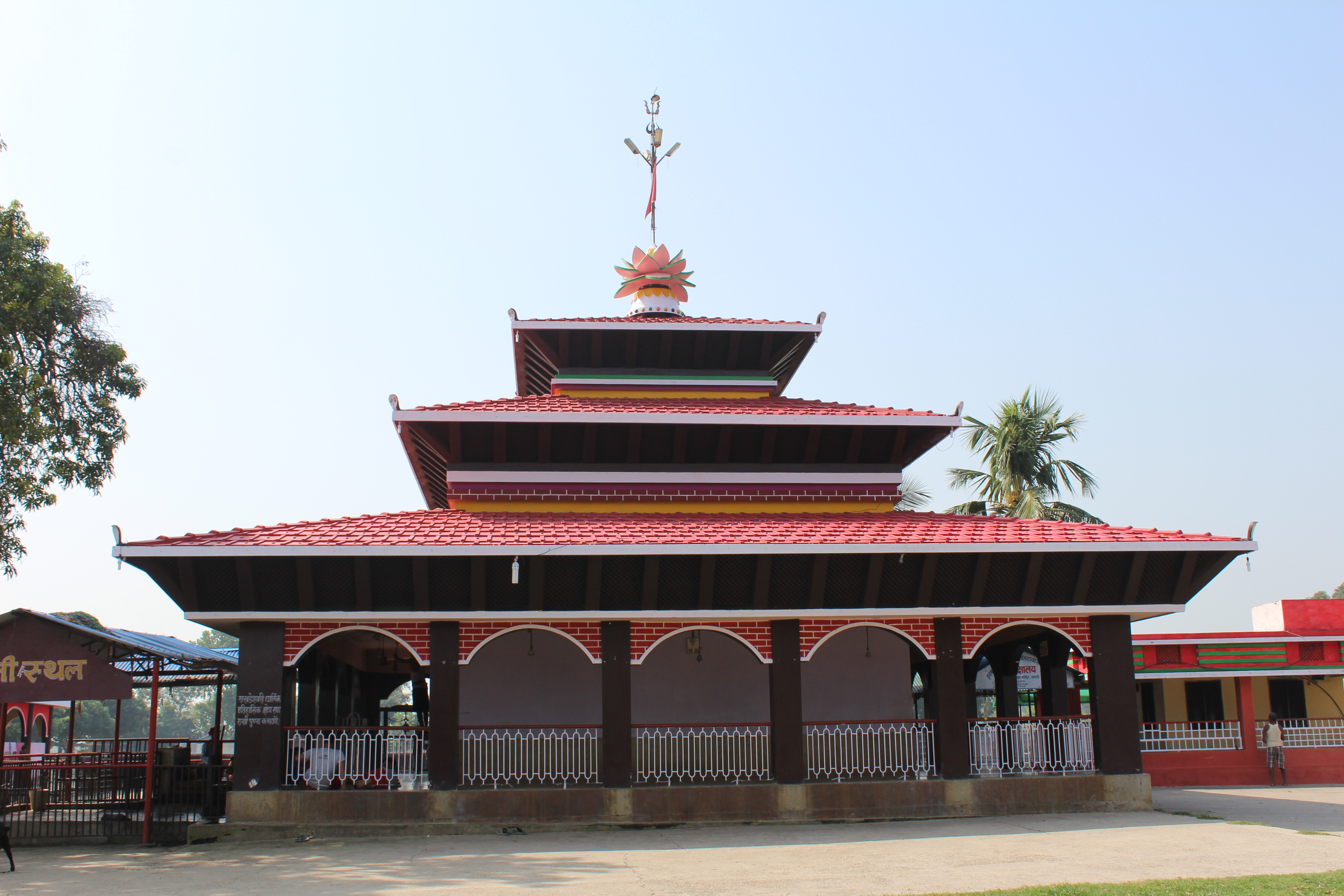
- From the top down: Goddess statue and full view of Temple from the south direction.

- Chinnamasta Bhagawati Temple in Nepal Chinnamasta Bhagawati Temple (Nepal)

Religion
- Affiliation: Hinduism
- District: Saptari
- Deity: Chhinnamasta
- Festival: Bada Dashain

Location
- Location: Sakhda, Chhinnamasta
- State: Madhesh
- Country: Nepal
- Interactive map of Chinnamasta Bhagawati Temple
- Coordinates: 26°27′04″N 86°43′52″E

Chinnamasta Bhagawati also called Shakhada Bhagawati and Shakhadeswori (Nepali: छिन्नमस्ता भगवती) is a temple and Shakti Peetha in Eastern Nepal. It was established in the 13th century by Shaktisimhadeva, the fifth ruler of the Karnata dynasty. The temple is in Chhinnamasta Rural Municipality, Saptari, 10 km from Rajbiraj near the Indian border. It is the oldest and most revered religious site in the Saptari district and draws thousands of devotees from Nepal and India during Bada Dashain and other festivals to worship the Hindu goddess Bhagawati.

== Etymology ==
The historical name of the temple is Sakhada Bhagawati and the surrounding area is known as Sakhada. The name 'Sakhada' is an abbreviation of the last affix of 'Shakra'. The name is derived from the King's nickname, Shakrasimhadeva who is also known as Shaktisimhadeva. In modern times, the temple is known as Chinnamasta because the goddess's head was missing.

== History ==
In 1097 CE, the Karnat dynasty was established by Nanyadeva in Simraungadh. Nanyadeva, who was from Karnata, left his state and ran through Pataliputra and came to stay in Bara district of Nepal. He made Nanapura, Champaran as his first capital but later he moved his capital to Simraungadh. He was accompanied by lot of his followers including Hindu priests and Kayastha community members. King Nanyadeva's fifth generation descendant was King Shaktisimhadeva aka Shakrasimhadeva (r. 1285 to 1295 CE). He was overthrown in a coup d'état by his general and minister Chadeshwar Thakur with the help of Think-tank council in 1295 CE.

After he was dethroned from his supremacy, he came to the present day Saptari district to live the rest of his life in Vaanaprastha (forest life) after handing over the kingdom to his younger son Harisimhadeva. Over time, the village was full of jungle. He cleared the dense jungle with his men to build a temple and establish his goddess deity in his name as Sakhreswari. The king's fort was nearby the temple, locally known as Gadhi Gaachhi.

The temple is locally known as Sakhra Bhagawati or Sakhreswari Bhagawati. Since the severed head of the goddess Bhagwati idol is there, it is known as Chinnamasta Bhagawati.

== Invasion ==
The Tughlaq dynasty ruled the Delhi sultanate and most of Northern India from 1320 to 1413 CE. In 1324 CE, the founder of the dynasty and Sultan of Delhi, Ghiyasuddin Tughlaq turned his attention towards Bengal. They invaded Bengal and on his way back to Delhi, the ruler came to know about Simraungadh. The Tughlaq armies cross through present-day Saptari to reach Simraungadh, which caused damage to this temple and idol of goddess Bhagawati.

== Gallery ==
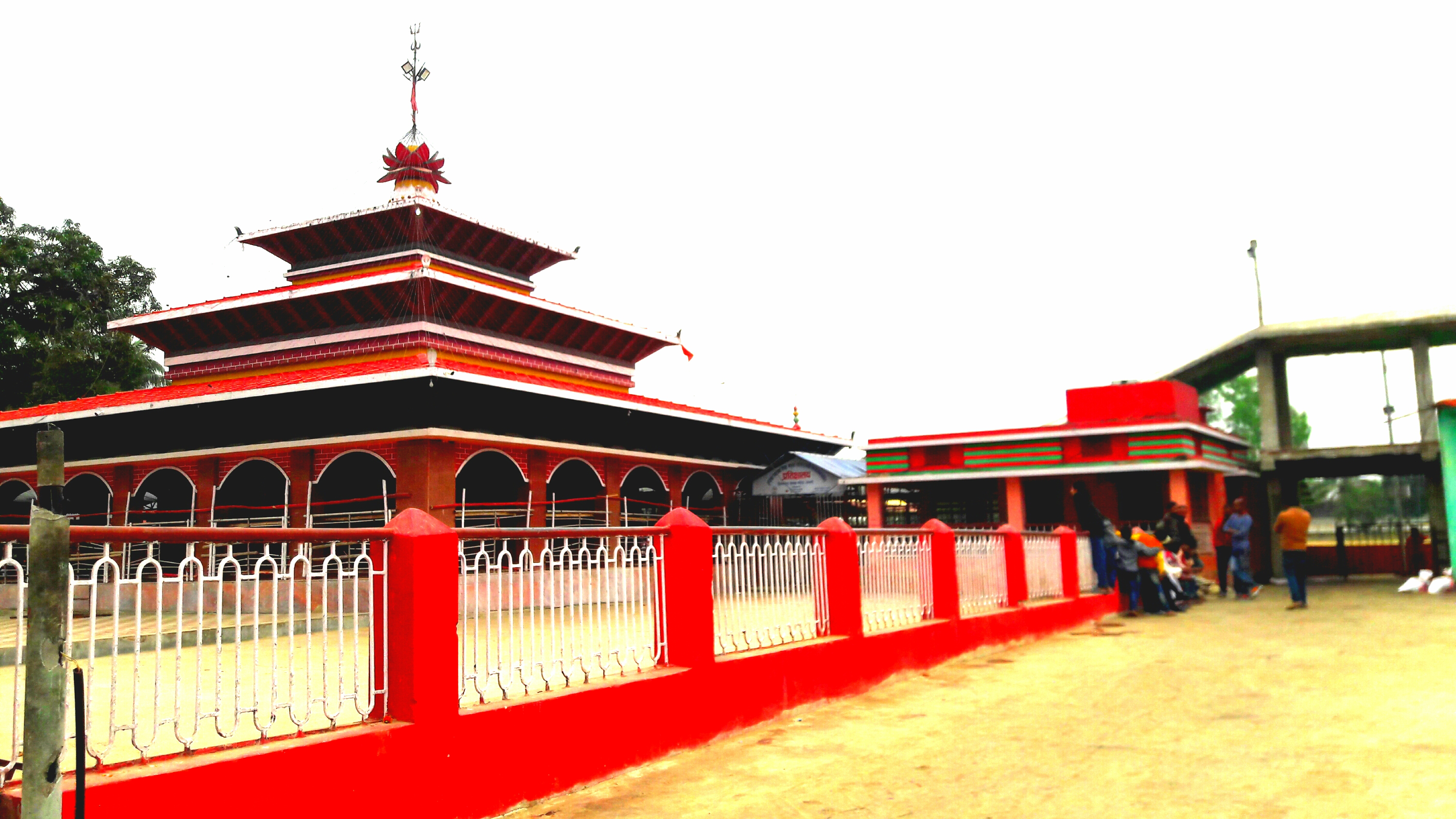
The temple seen from the north gate.

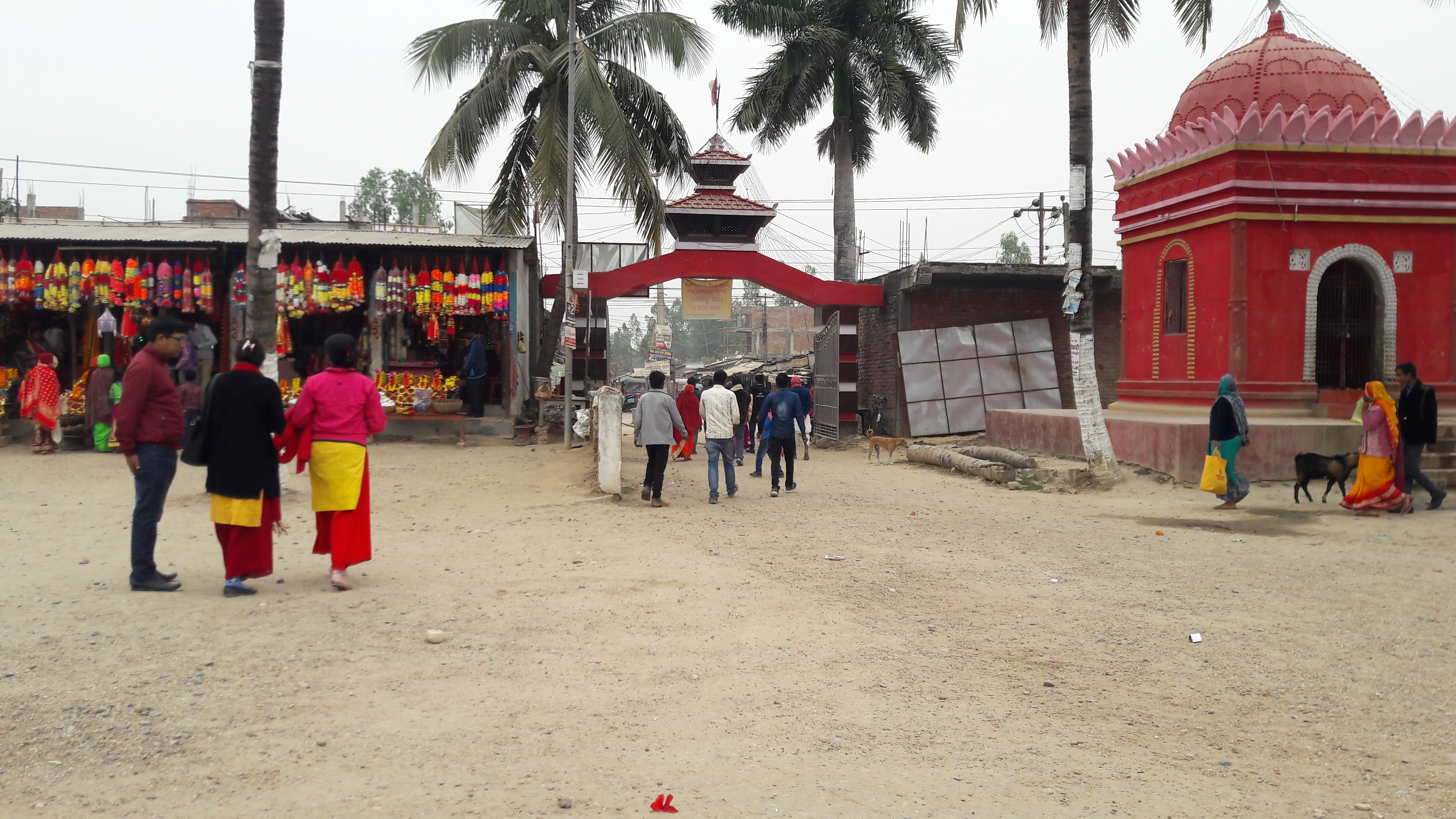
North entrance gate.

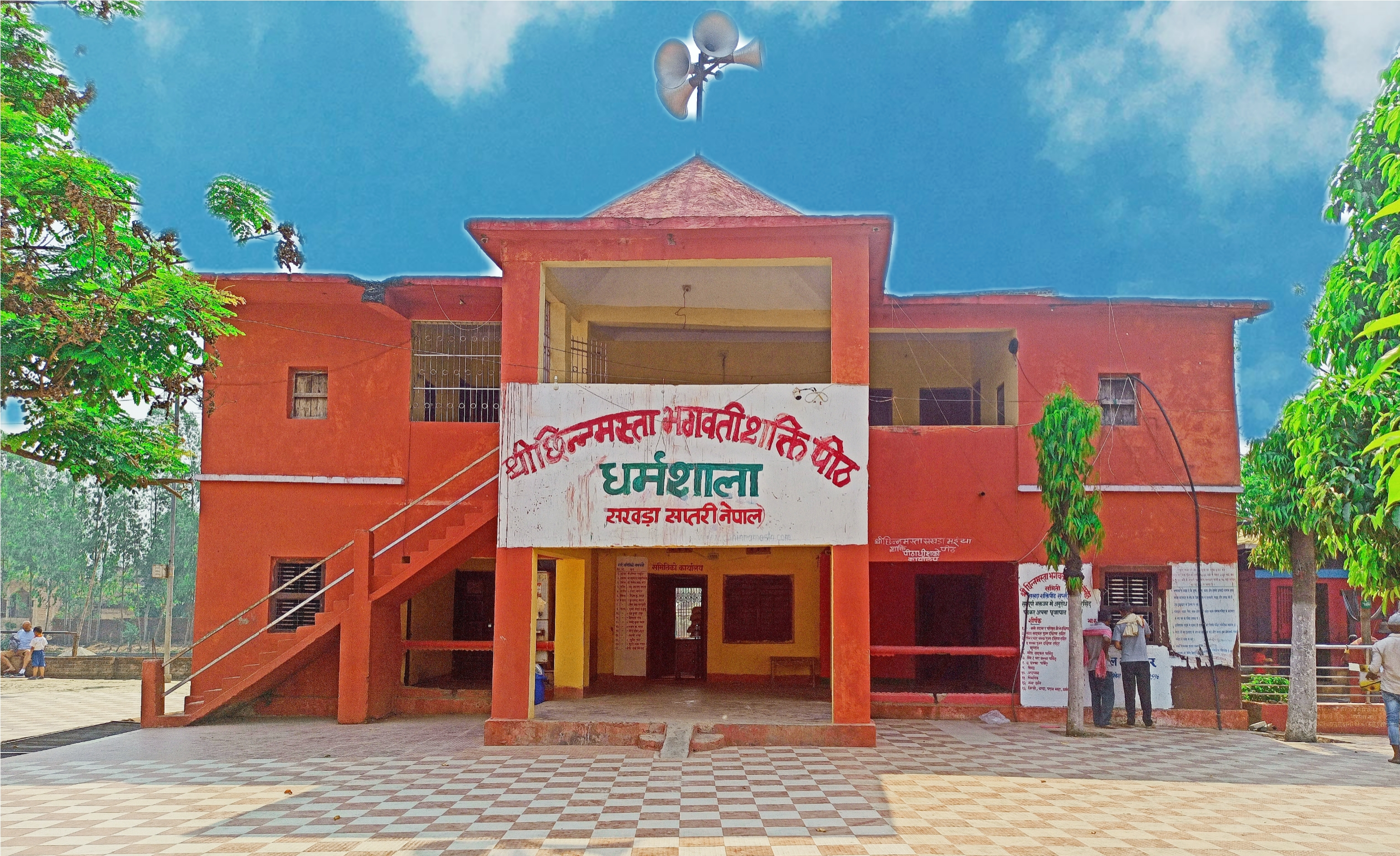
Chinnamasta temple dharmashala.
