= Kameshwar Thakur =

King of Mithila

King of Mithila
- Coronation: 1325
- Predecessor: Harisimhadeva of Karnat Dynasty
- Successor: Bhogisvara Thakkura
- Born: Kameshwar; Oini
- Kingdom: Mithila Kingdom
- Kingdom: Tirhut Sarkar
- Dynasty: Oiniwar Dynasty
- Religion: Hinduism

Kameshwar Thakur (Maithili: कामेश्वर ठाकुर) was the first king of the Oiniwar Dynasty in the Mithila Kingdom. After the collapse of the Karnat Dynasty's rule in 1324 CE, Kameshwar Thakur successed the throne of the Mithila kingdom in 1325 CE.

== Early life ==
Kameshwar Thakur was born at Oini in the family of Nath Thakur (Oini Thakur), the founder of Oiniwar Dynasty in Mithila. He was a Maithil Brahmin and belonged to Kashyap Gotra. The mool of his ancestors was Khaūade-jagatpur.

== Later life ==
Kameshwar Thakur was an eminent scholar and Guru of the King Harisimhadeva in the Karnat Dynasty. He was the Rajpandita (chief priest) at the court of the Karnat King Harisimhadeva. He was a Shrotriya Maithil Brahmin.
