= Khalji invasion of Mithila =

Invasion of Mithila from the Delhi Sultanate

Alauddin Khalji's invasion of Mithila
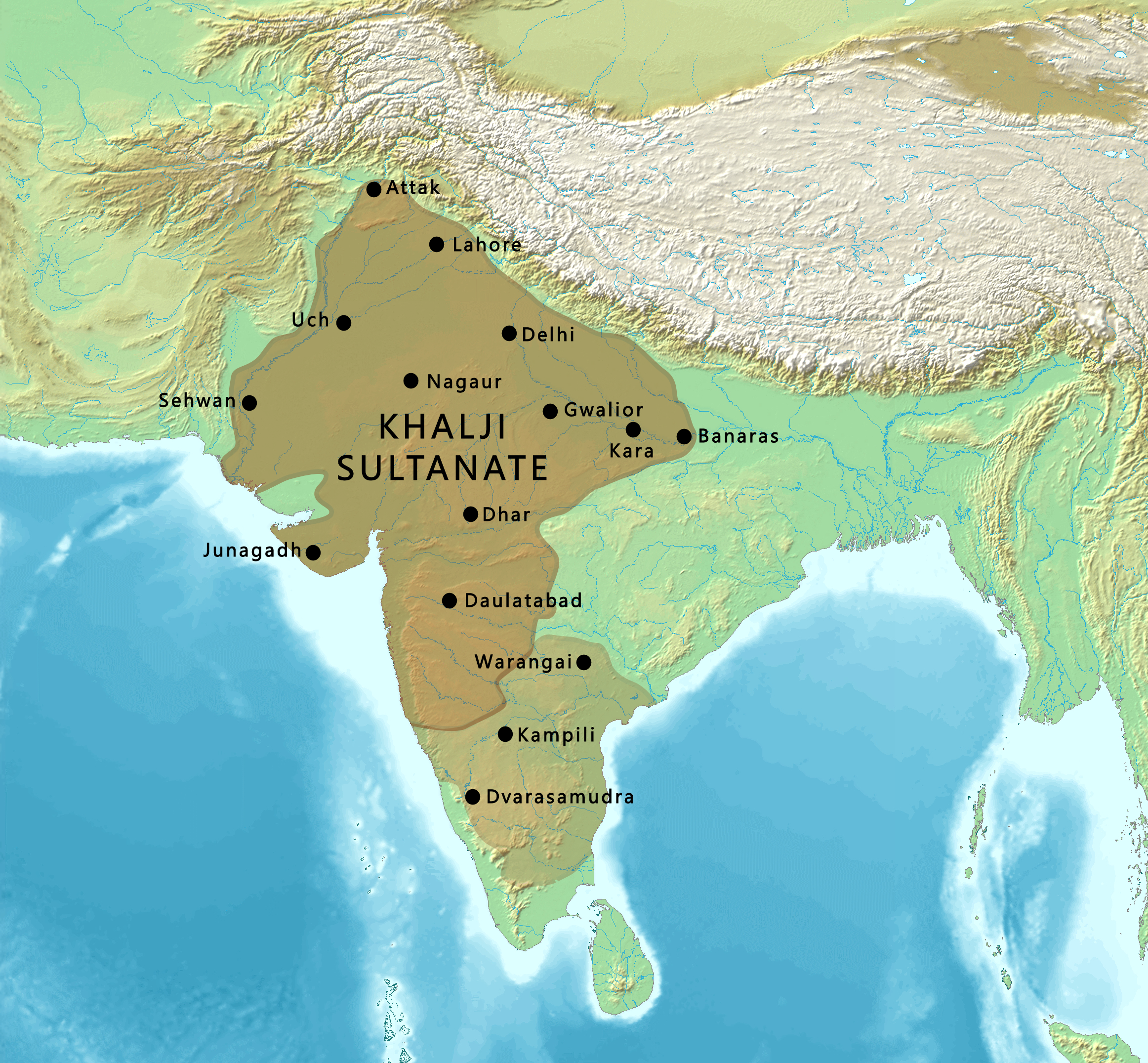
- Map of the Khalji dynasty of the Delhi Sultanate
| Date | 1297–1298 |
| Location | Mithila, Bihar |

Belligerents
| Delhi Sultanate | Karnats of Mithila |

Commanders and leaders
| Sheikh Ismail | Shaktisimhadeva (POW) |

The Khalji invasion of Mithila took place between 1297–1298 as a military expedition led by the Delhi Sultanate against the Karnats of Mithila in present-day Northern Bihar.

The only source for the conflict between the Delhi Sultanate and Mithila is Mulla Taqia. According to him, the Mithila king Shaktisimhadeva defeated the Delhi army in the first three battles, fought at Maqbara and Sakkuri. In the final battle, the Mithila king was defeated and arrested. According to the Mithila tradition, Shaktisimharadeva subsequently served as a commander of the Delhi army during Alauddin Khalji's conquest of Ranthambore, but this tradition is not supported by any reliable evidence. Nevertheless, the Mithila king likely became an ally or a vassal of Alauddin Khalji: according to Mulla Taqia, he financially supported Alauddin Khalji. Mithila appears to have regained its independent status as an ally of the Delhi Sultanate, until its annexation by the Tughluq dynasty in 1324.

== Background ==
After annexing most of Western India, Alauddin set his sight eastwards and eventually moved to Mithila where his army encountered with Shaktisimhadeva of the Karnat Dynasty of Mithila. Shaktisimhadeva's main strength was in his minister Vireshvara, who himself was the father of Chandeshvara Thakur.

== Battles ==
The Khalji army eventually encountered Northern Bihar in the Mithila region. There, the army was immediately confronted by Shaktisimhadeva, the successors to Ramasimhadeva's rule. Four battles occurred between them with reports from Mulla Taqia indicating that the Khalji army suffered defeat twice in the first two skirmishes at the hands of Karnat King and his commander from Mithila. However, in the third battle, Khalji sent his commander, Seikh Ismail, to capture the King and was successful, capturing numerous territories of Mithila as well. but this proved short lived as Shaktisimhadeva regained those territories against Alauddin's strength when they became independent in their final verdict - all according to accounts provided by Mulla Taqia himself.

== Aftermath ==
Amir Khusrav records that Alauddin Khalji proceeded to the Bihar garden after his victory in Karra, with an intention of staining the soil there red like a tulip with blood. According to Mulla Taqia and the prevailing Mithila tradition advocating for independence, it is justifiable to conclude that Tirhut (Mithila) triumphed by all measures in safeguarding its autonomous position against Alauddin's imperial power. Amongst numerous other states at the time, Tirhut (Mithila) was able to maintain its freedom from Alauddin's rule.

After the arrest of Mithila king Shaktisimhadeva, He was appointed as the commander-in-chief of Alauddin's army against his enemies. His imprisonment was short-lived, He and his commander Vireshvara were able to gain independence again and maintained alliance with the Alauddin Khalji. The Tughlaq regime subsequently took over with Chandeshvara Thakur, son of Vireshvara Thakur serving as commander for the Karnat Dynasty later. While attempting to rescue people in the Nepal region from hostile Tughlaq generals; he had some skirmishes but ultimately succeeded against them. During this era, King Harisimhadeva ascended to power after Shaktisimhadeva passed away as his successor.

== See also ==
- Muhammad Bakhtiyar Khalji
