= Sugauna =

Historical Village of Mithila

Coordinates: 26°24′24″N 86°13′04″E

Sugauna Sugona
- Village
- Sugauna
- Nickname: Shukavan
- Interactive map of Sugauna
- Country: India
- State: Bihar
- Region: Mithila region
- District: Madhubani district
- Block: Rajnagar
- Became capital of the Tirhut Sarkar: 14th-15th century CE
- Demonym: Maithil
- Earlier capital of Oiniwar Dynasty or Sugauna Dynasty in Mithila

Sugauna is a large village in the Madhubani district of the Mithila region in Bihar, India. It is situated near the Rajnagar Palace in the Madhubani district. It is a historical village and once it was the capital of the Oiniwar Dynasty in Mithila. In the present time, the village is divided into two Gram Panchyats Sugauna North and Sugauna South.

== History ==
According to historians, in some unknown period of time, the capital of the Oiniwar Dynasty in Mithila was transferred from Oini to Sugauna. Thus the Oiniwar Dynasty is also known Sugauna Dynasty.

In the early period, this village was also known as Shukavan or Sugaon or Sugrama. It was the penance place of the scholar Kameshwar Thakur who was the Guru of the King Harisimhadeva of the Karnat Dynasty in Mithila.
