= Simraungadh =

Simraungadh सिम्रौनगढ
- Municipality
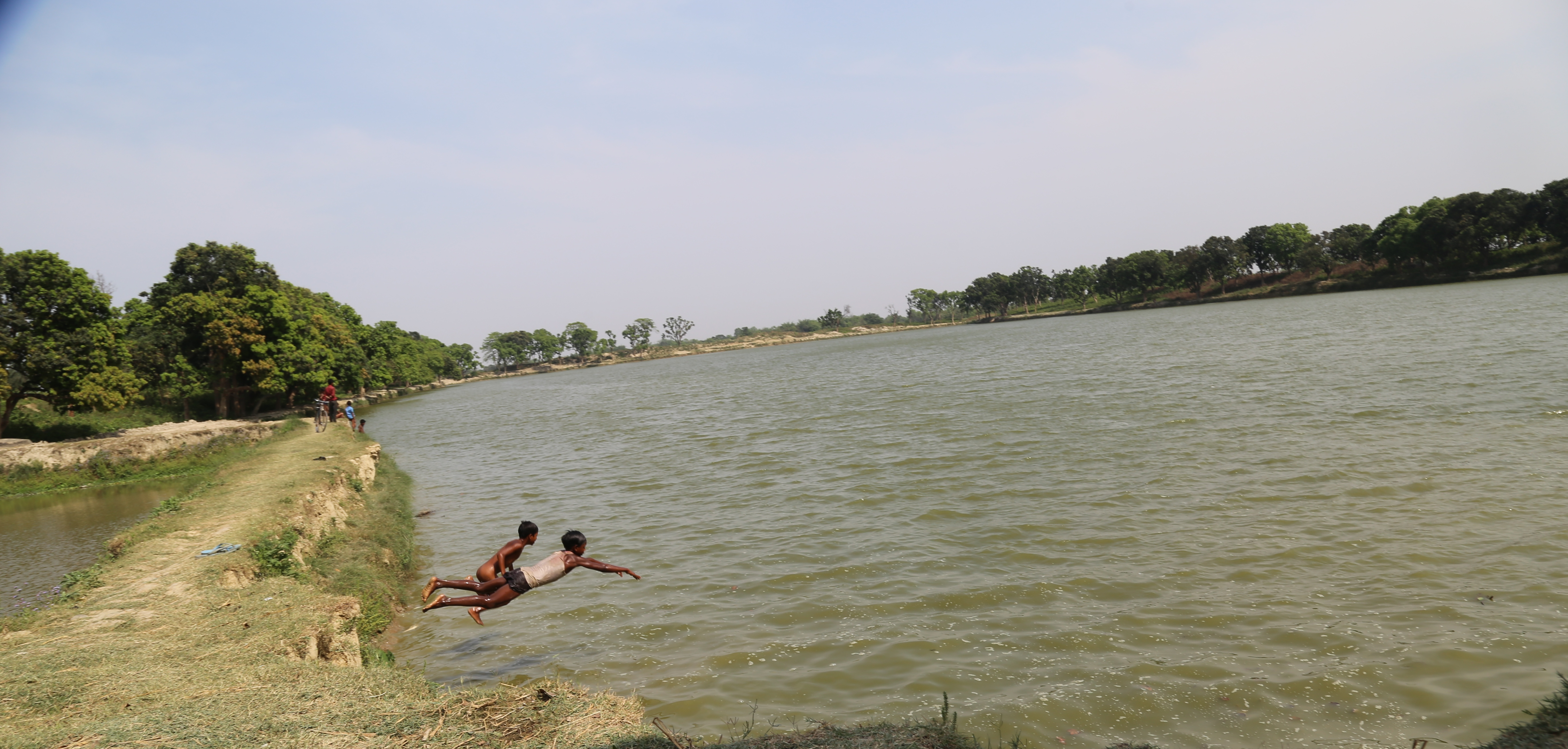

- Location in Nepal Simraungadh (Madhesh Province)
- Coordinates: (26.8893386, 85.1168150)26°53′22″N 85°7′1″E
- Country: Nepal
- Province: Madhesh Province
- District: Bara District

Government
  - Mayor: Kishori Sah Kalwar (Loktantrik Samajwadi Party, Nepal)
  - Deputy Mayor: Najmu Sehar (Loktantrik Samajwadi Party, Nepal)

Area
  - Total: 42.65 km^{2} (16.47 sq mi)

Population (2011)
  - Total: 49,939
- Time zone: UTC+5:45 (NST)
- Website: www.simraungadhmun.gov.np

Simraungadh, Simraongarh or Simroungarh (/ˈsiːmraʊnɡɜːr/, Devanagari: सिम्रौनगढ) is a municipality situated in Bara district of Nepal.

The municipality was created in 2014 by agglomerating the Village Development Committees of Amritganj, Golaganj, Hariharpur & Uchidih and later on expanded the municipality areas to include Bhagwanpur, Kachorwa, Dewapur-Teta, and Bishnupur.

The municipality is also contains parts of an archaeological site which is split between Indian and Nepal and which finds mention in the travel accounts of a Tibetan monk and pilgrim, Dharmasvamin (1236) when he was on his way back to Nepal And Tibet, an Italian Missionary traveler, Cassiano Beligatti (1740), Colonel James Kirkpatrick (1801) on his mission to Nepal and later used in 1835 by British ethnologist Brian Houghton Hodgson.

The city is located along the border between India and Nepal. It lies 90 km (56 mi) south of Nepal's capital, Kathmandu, and 28 km (17 mi) east of Birgunj metro city. Bhojpuri is the local language of Simraungadh.

== Etymology ==
The name Simraon comes from the local language Simr which stands for Simal tree found in the area. Simraongarh's relationship with the Simal forest has been also revealed by Gopal Raj Vamshavali, the oldest chronicles of Nepal. The Tibetan monk and traveler, Dharmasavamin states Simrāongarh as Pa-ta. The word Pata is an abbreviation of last affix of 'Pattana', which means a capital in Sanskrit language.

== History ==
Simraungadh was the capital of an independent Hindu kingdom of the Mithila or Tirhut from the 11th century to early 14th century. The fortified city was built along the present-day border between India and Nepal. The rule of the Karnat dynasty marks an important milestone and a golden age in the history of Tirhut. The rise of this empire saw the birth of efficient administration, social reforms, religious and the development of local folk music and literature.

== Karnat dynasty ==
The Simraon, Karnat, or Dev Dynasty originated with the establishment of a kingdom in 1097 CE headquartered at present-day Simraungadh in Bara district. The kingdom controlled the areas we today know as Tirhut or Mithila in India and Nepal. This region is bounded by the Mahananda River in the east, the Ganges in the south, the Gandaki River in the west, and by the Himalayas in the north. The boundary line was made between the two countries after the Treaty of Sugauli in 1816 CE.

According to French orientalist and indologist Sylvain Lévi, Nanyadeva established his supremacy over Simraungadh probably with the help of Chalukya king Vikramaditya VI. After the reign of Vikramaditya VI in 1076 CE, he led the successful military campaign over modern Bengal and Bihar.

The rulers of Simraongarh are as follows:

S.N.	Name of the rulers	Timeline	Notes
1	Nanya Dev	1097 - 1147 CE	
2	Gangadeva	1147 - 1187 CE	
3	Narsimhadeva	1187 - 1227 CE	
4	Ramasimhadeva	1227 - 1285 CE	
5	Shaktisimhadeva	1285 - 1295 CE	
6	Harisingh Dev	1295 - 1324 CE	

== Geography and climate ==
Simraungadh is located at 26°53′22″N 85°7′1″E. It has an average elevation of 83 meters. The Simraungdah town lies on the flat and fertile plain of Terai. In the south, the city borders Bijwani in the border of the Indian state of Bihar, while Adarsh Kotwal in the north.

== Tourist attractions ==
=== Ranivas Temple and Palace ===
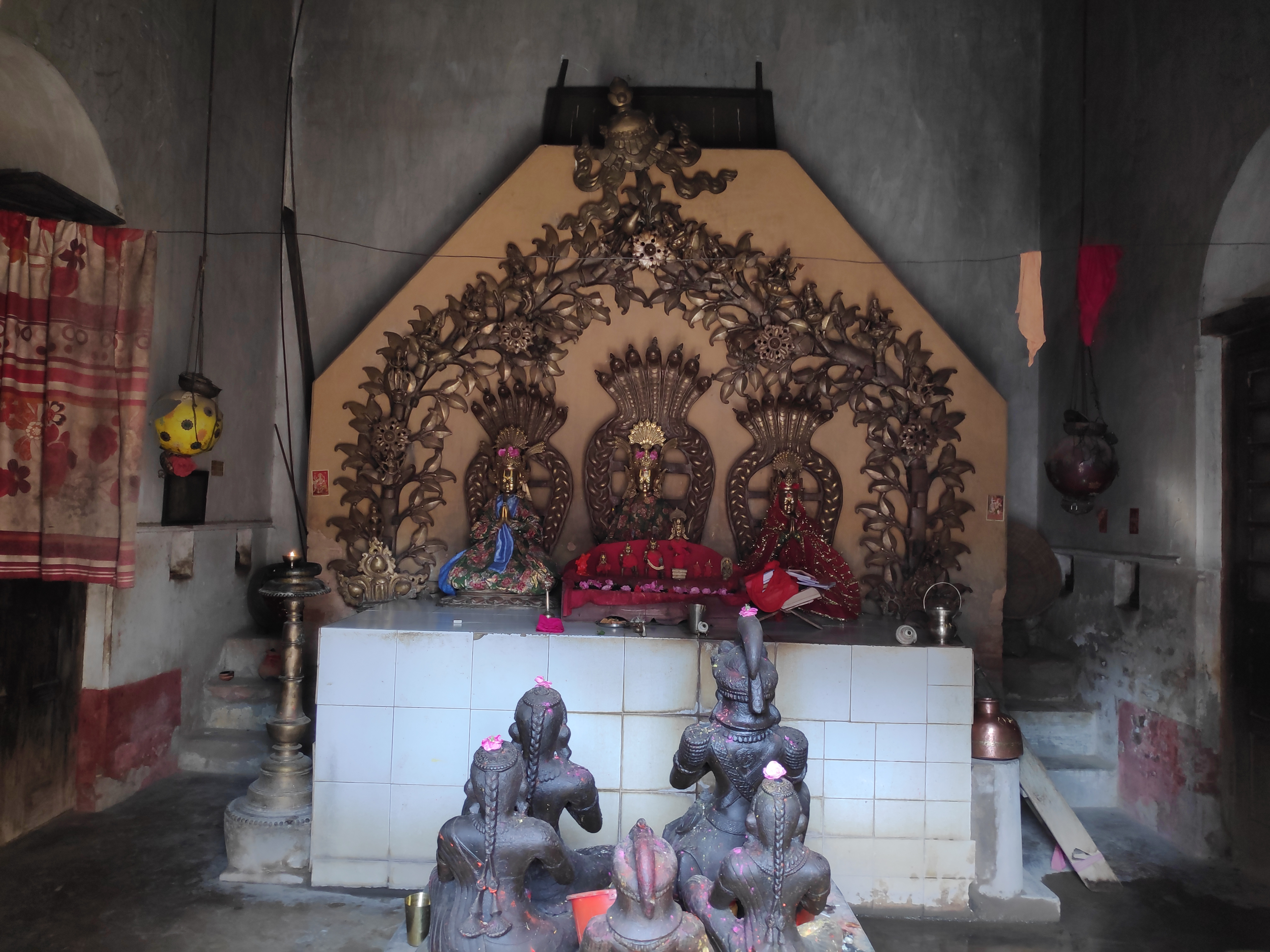
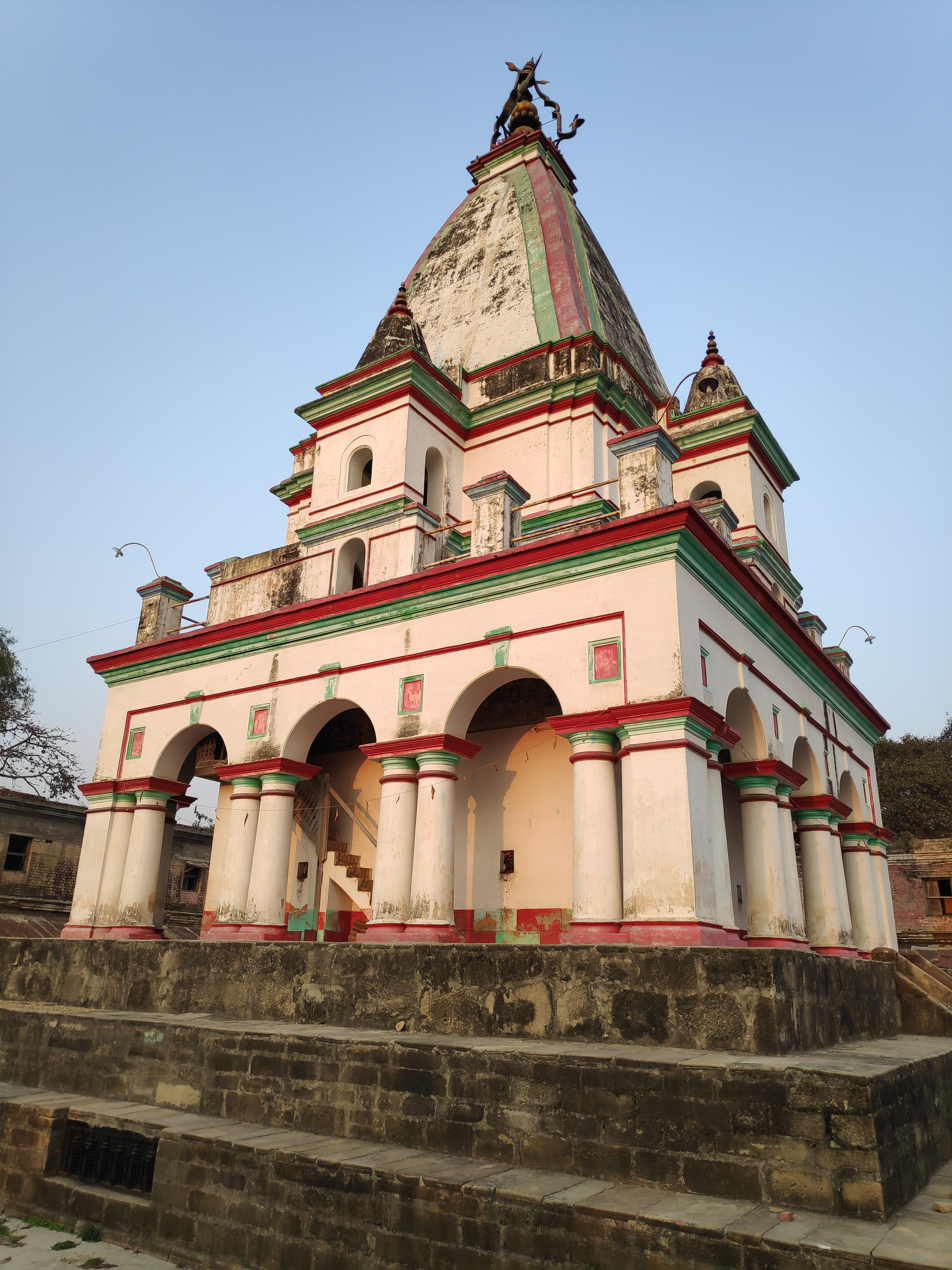
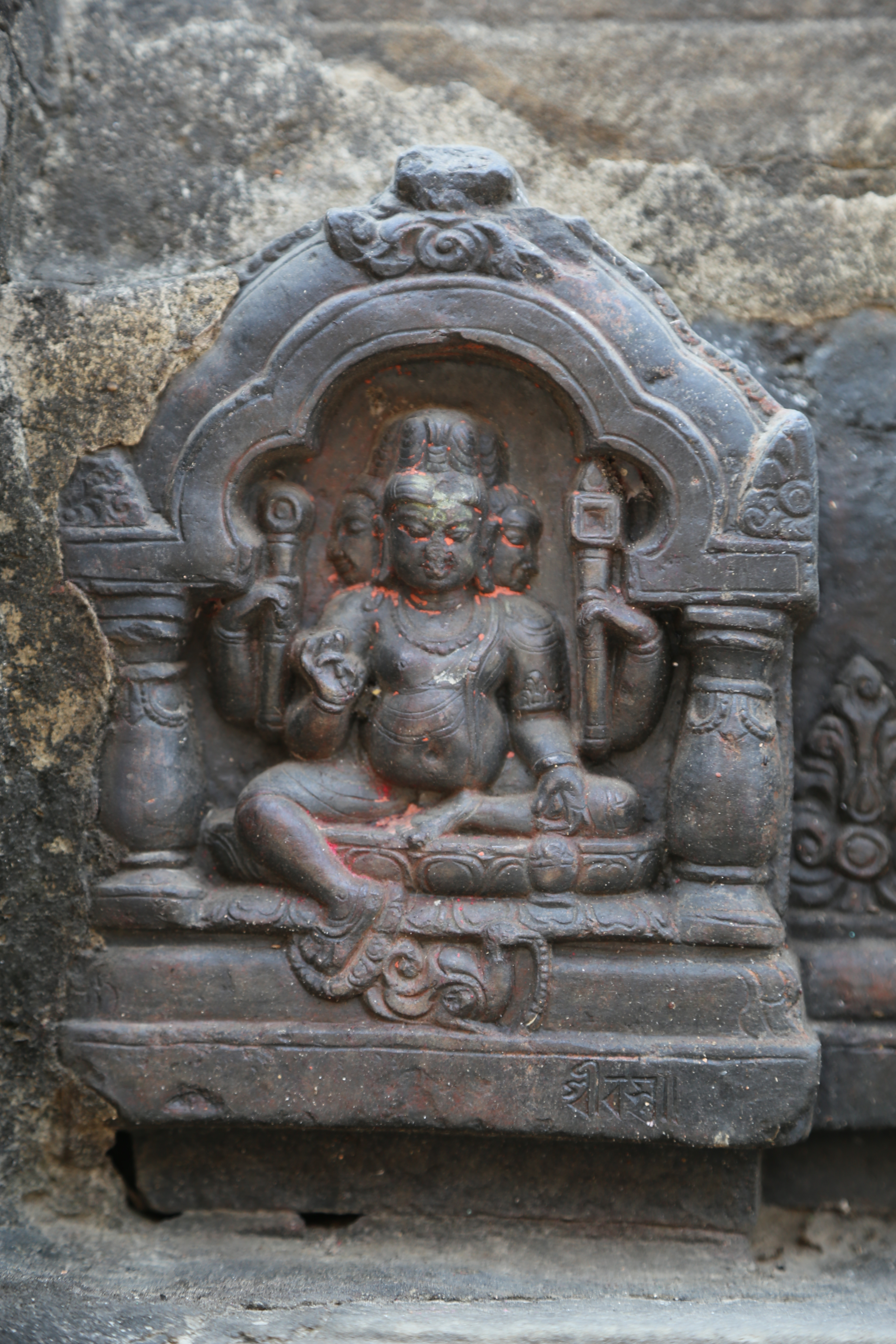
From left, Idols of Ram, Sita, and Laxman, Ranivas Temple, and Brahma statue placed on temple basement wall.

Ranivas Complex comprises 'Ranivas Temple' which is also known as 'Ram Mandir', 'Ram Janaki Mandir', 'Ranivas Palace' and 'Mahal Sarai' is located 1 Kilometer north of Simraungadh market area and 2 Kilometer north of the Indian border. The complex is spread in 600 bighas. It is one of the most visited sites of Simraungadh by local and foreign tourists. The present Ram Janaki temple is built in 1878 AD by Jagat Jung Rana, son of Jung Bahadur Rana. In 1877 AD, then Prime Minister Jung Bahadur Rana died at a place called Patharghat, Rautahat while returning from a hunting camp from Simraungadh. According to the wish expressed by his queen Hiranya Garbha Devi while going to Sati, his son built this temple in 1878 AD.

It is said and believed that this temple and present structure of Ranivas Palace is built upon the ancient palace of the Karnat dynasty. After the fall of Karntas, Oiniwar dynasty comes into the power who ruled Mithila region from 1325 to 1527 AD. It is also believed that the Maharaja of Oinwar dynasty, Siva Singh (r. 1412 - 1416), built this palace for his daughter Isri Devi during his ruling time.

=== Kankali Temple ===
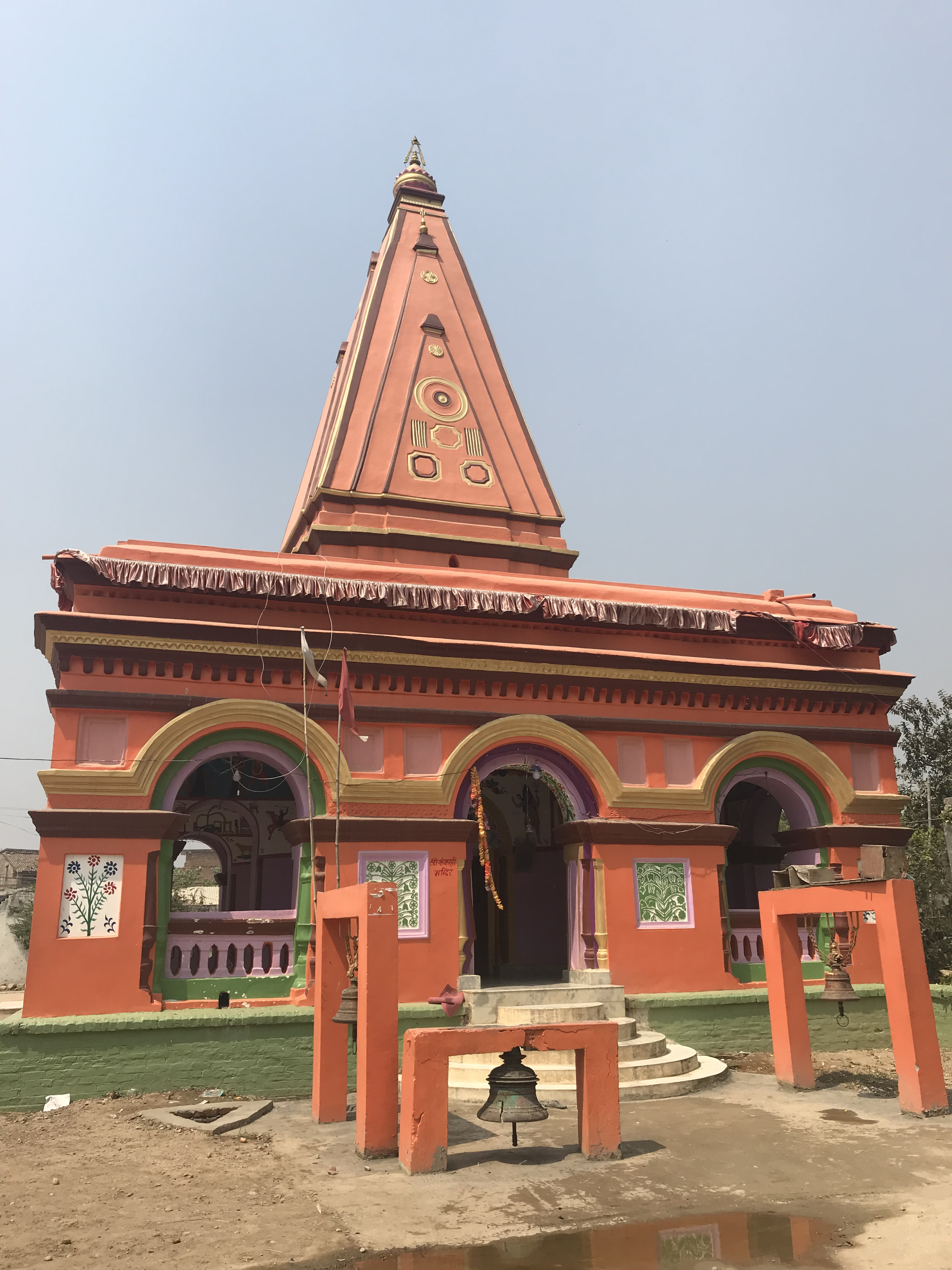
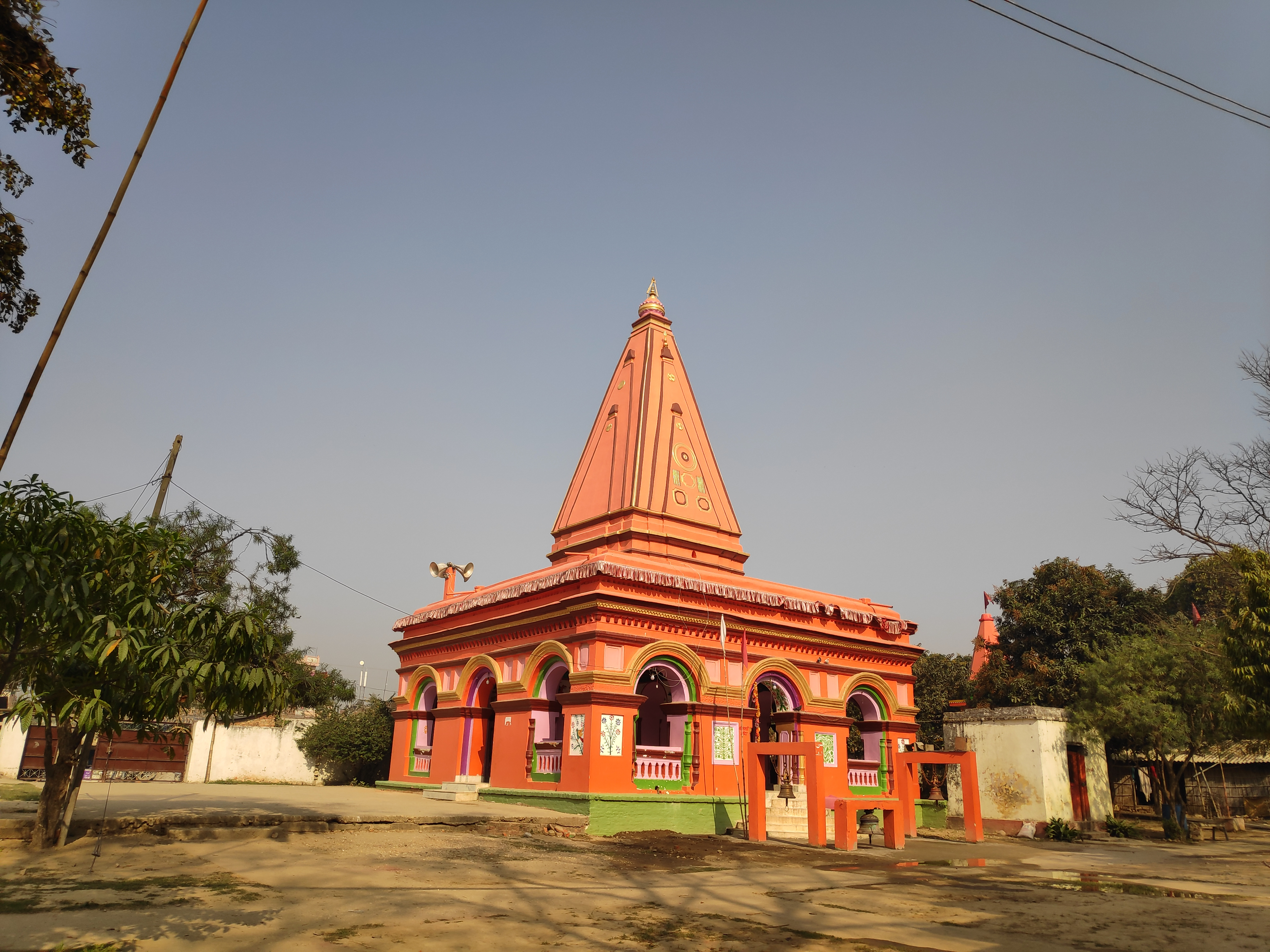
Close view and full view of Kankali Temple

Kankali Temple is a Hindu temple located in the southeastern part of the Simraungadh market area. This temple is built in the shikhara style of architecture. The idol of Kankali Mai is placed in the temple, which is made of black stone and believed to be mangled by Tughlaq armies. The date L.S. 119 (which must be in Vikram Samvat: 1340 and Common era: 1283) is engraved on the Ghanta, which is placed in front of this temple. Before the renovation of this temple, the ruin of this temple was known as "Kankali Mai Sthaan". The temple was restored in a small size by Mansaram Baba before 1816 AD and the present structure was made by his disciple, Ram Sewak Das in 1967 AD. During the festivals of Rama Navami in Chaitra, there is the presence of thousands of worshipers from Nepal and India.

=== Jharokhar Pokhari ===
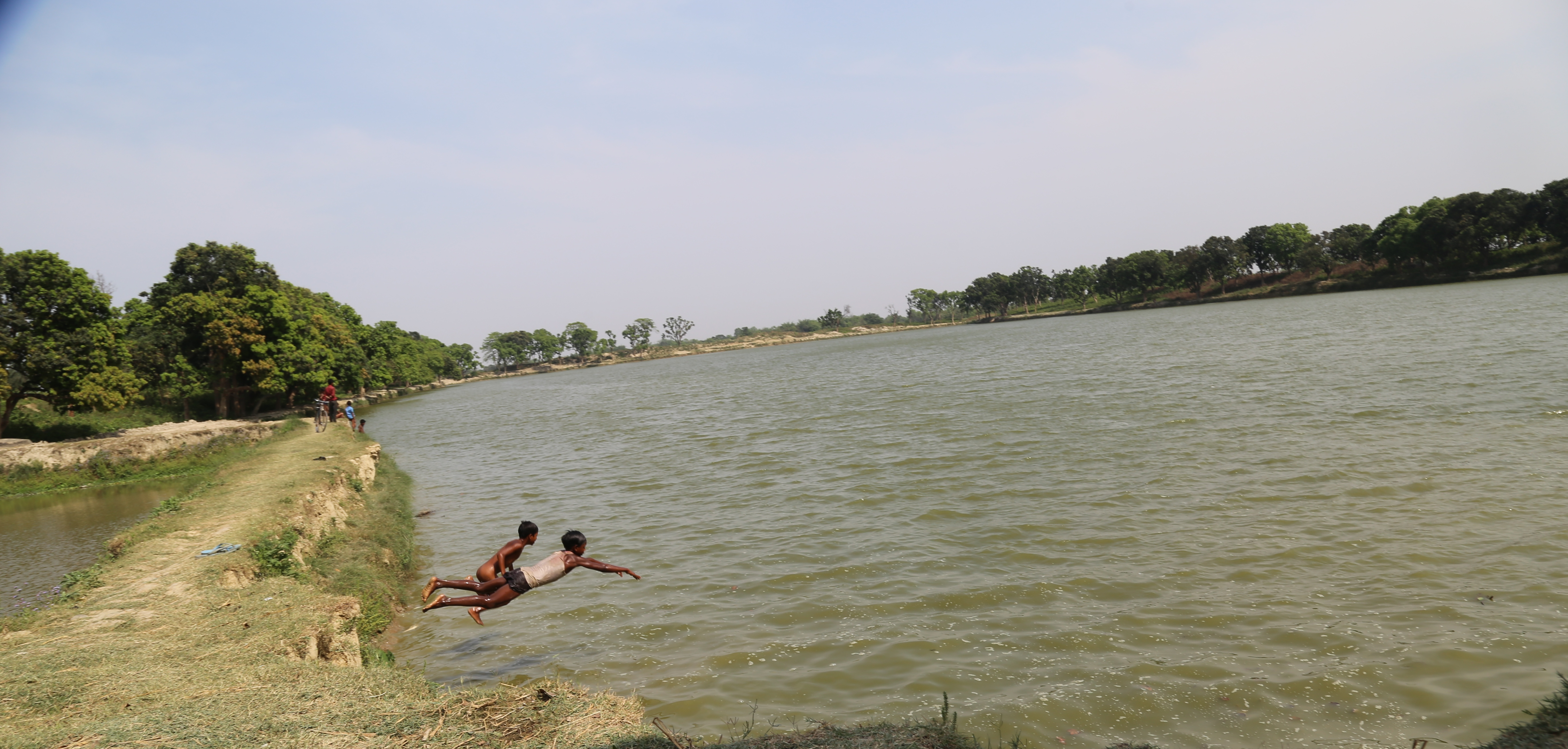
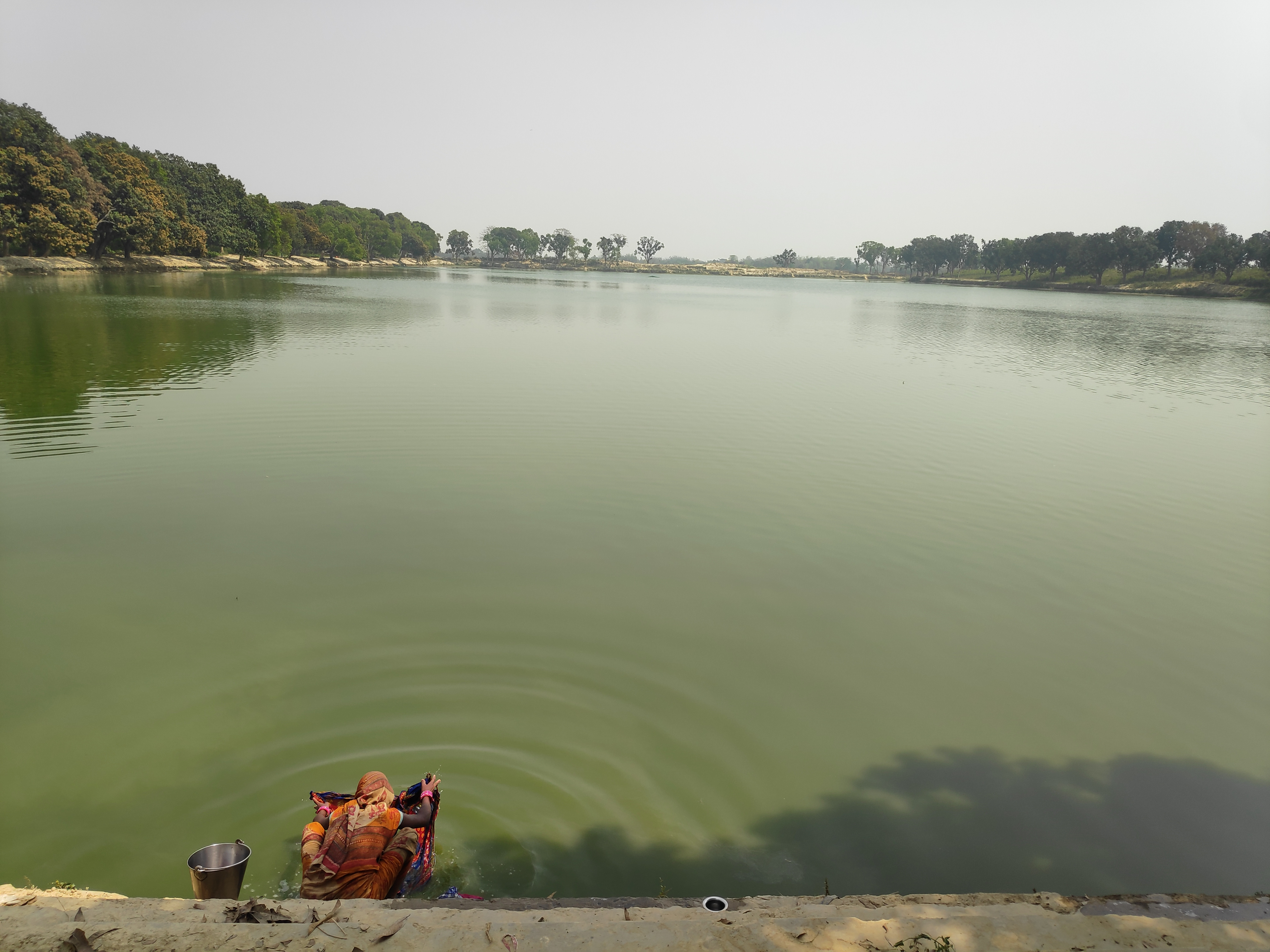
From left, Children jumping in Jharokhar Pokhari and view of pond

Jharokhar Pokhari, 'Deutaal Pokhari' or 'Kachorwa Pokhari' is an artificial pond spread in 52 bighas (87 acres). As of 2020 AD, the pond is shrunk to 22 bighas (36 acres) due to a lack of maintenance and human encroachment. The Jharokhar pond, which is connected to the Nepal-India border by Dasgaja, is believed to be about 800 years old and is located in Baswariya, Simraungadh. There is an Indian village, Jharokhar which is about two hundred meters south of the pond. This is one of the largest man-made spring pond of Nepal.

== Medieval city plan and fortification ==
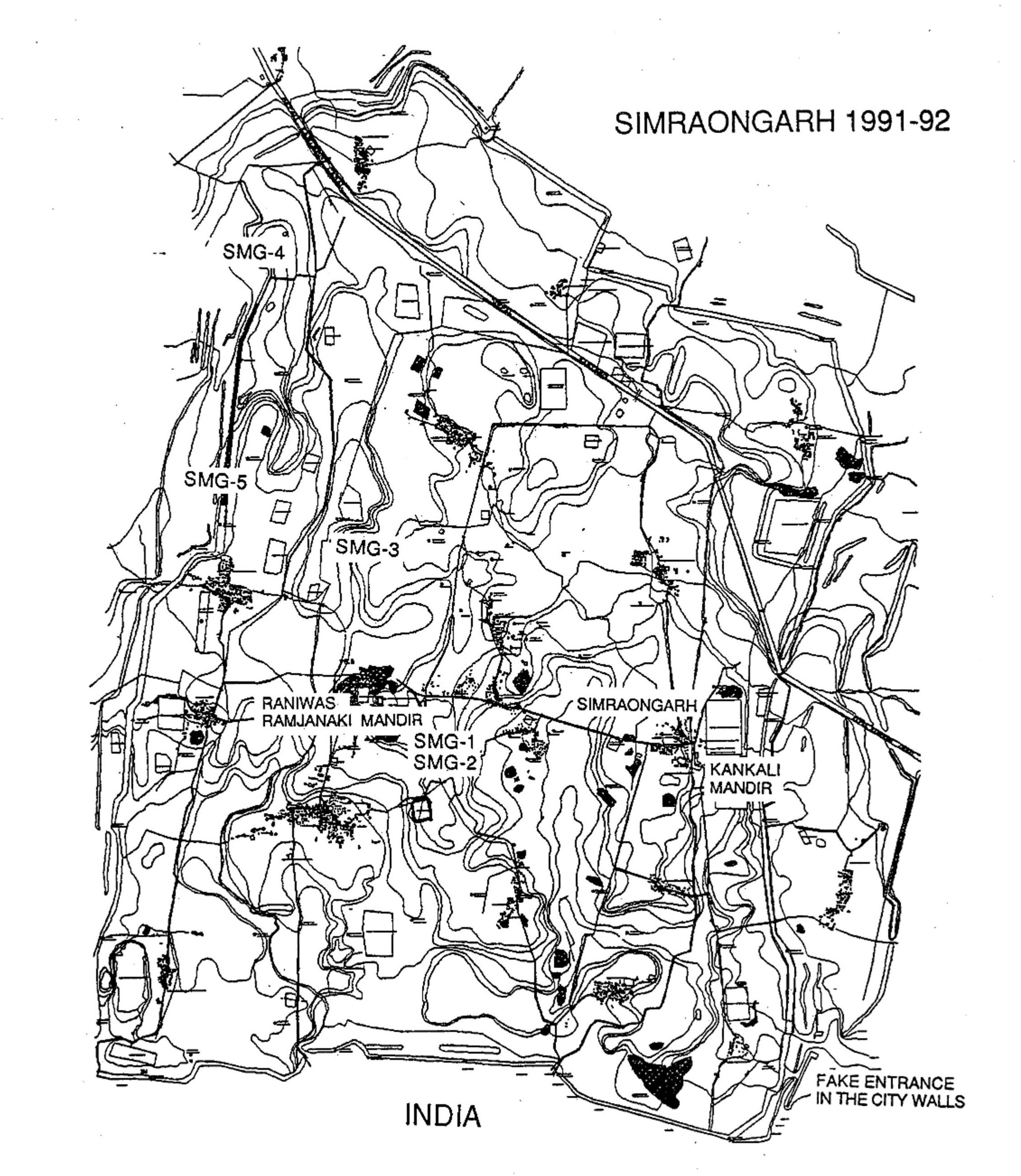
from left, Simraongarh city plan in 1991-92 by Vidale, M., Balista, C. and Torrieri, V. and City plan according to Cassiano Beligatti in 1740

The medieval city of Simraungadh is enclosed within an impressive system of earthen ramparts and infilled ditches. The fortification of the medieval city has a rectangular shape and ground plan. The fortifications of Simraungadh are called Baahi locally and remembered as a Labyrinth. The fort is spread in 6 Kos and the main enclosure is about 7.5 km north–south and 4.5 km east–west. The eastern and western side of the fort were built over two natural embankments. The western side of the fort was dry in comparison to eastern side. The Labyrinth and the powerful defense system of the city was well planned to protect from the river floods, enemies and regulate agriculture from controlled flow of water from the ditches shows the ability of the Kingdom.

During the reign of Rama Singh Deva (r. 1227 - 1285 CE) over Simraungadh, the Tibetan monk Dharmasvamin visited the fortified city in 1236 AD on his way back to Nepal and Tibet from Nalanda. He made the following remarks regarding the palace and fortification system of Pa-ta (Simraungadh),

The city was surrounded by seven tall walls, and the palace had eleven large gates and was surrounded by 21 ditches filled with water and rows of trees. The height of the city walls was equal to that of a Tibetan fort. The protective measures were taken due to Tughlaq armies, who led an army expedition but failed to reach it.

After the fall and decline of the Karnat dynasty from Simraungadh, the region was either controlled by Oiniwar rulers or Makwanpur rulers until the Unification of Nepal in 1768 AD. During the period of time an Italian Missionary traveller Cassiano Beligatti, with seven other missionaries reached this place on their way to Kathmandu Valley from Patna on 29 February 1740. He describes his journey on his travelling manuscript about this place is as follows,

There were some old ruins, and some seemed to be remains of substantial buildings. The city was situated in the quasi-labyrinth enclosed by high walls and was impossible to enter except on a single spot. There were four fortresses, which were evenly distributed from place to place within the enclosures of the labyrinth; and these enclosures had a distance from one side to the other of about a Kos or two miles, and the walls were extremely high with a width in proportion.
