= Jaiwar =

Sub-class in Maithil Brahmins

Jaiwar (Maithili: जैवार) is a sub-class within the Maithil Brahmins community in the Mithila region of the Indian subcontinent. It is the fourth sub-class, according to the hierarchical order in the Maithil Brahmins community. The other three upper sub-classes within the Maithil Brahmins community are Shrotriya, Yogya and Panjibaddha. The fourth sub-class of the Maithil Brahmins community are from the category of "Girhast". Those Brahmins in Mithila who used agriculture as their means of livelihood, were called Jaiwars. They were lacking the knowledge of Vedas and Shastras. They are also known as Girhast Brahmins.
