= Chaudhary Kedarnath Thakur =

- Predecessor: Choudhary Munindra Narayan Thakur
- Born: 1 June 1901
- Died: 3 March 1952 (aged 50); Darbhanga, Bihar.
- Spouse: Lalita Thakurain, Vindhwashni Thakurain, Sushila Thakurain
- Father: Choudhary Munindra Narayan Thakur
- Mother: Tarkeshwari Thakurain

Choudhary Kedarnath Thakur (1 June 1901 – 3 March 1952) was the Zamindar of Singhwara Estate situated in the Darbhanga district of Mithila in Bihar. He belonged to a Zamindari family of Mithila (region).

== Family history ==
Choudhary Kedarnath Thakur was a scion of the Singhwara Estate family. He was the son of Choudhary Munindra Narayan Thakur, the Zamindar of Singhwara Estate. Kedarnath was born on 1 June 1901 in a Maithil Brahmin family.. His great grandson Chaudhary Chinmay Thakur is still alive and resides in Delhi NCR

== Books ==
He was a regular reader of magazines or books published in Hindi, Maithili, Bangla, and Sanskrit. Hori Pachisi is a collection of 25 Holi-related songs in Maithili written by Thakur. During his life Thakur also produced a number of books including a novel Saundaryooashnaka Puraskar and the play Dahej, and he translated a number of Bengali and Persian stories into Maithili, including Gramkatha (from Bengali to Maithili) and Nongar Sneha (from Persian to Maithili) between 1930 and 1940.

== Death ==
In 1952, Thakur fell ill and died at his home.
