= Yogya Brahmin =

Second sub-class of Maithil Brahmins

Yogya Brahmin (Maithili: योग्य ब्राह्मण) is a second sub-class within the traditional Maithil Brahmins community in the Mithila region of the Indian subcontinent. In the traditional hierarchy of the Maithil Brahmins community, Yogyas are placed after the Shrotriyas. This sub-class of the Maithil Brahmins community is also known as Bhalmanush. The Brahmins belonging to this sub-class are scholars devoted to learning Vedic texts.

== Etymology ==
Yogya is an Indic term. The literal meaning of the term Yogya is capable. The second sub-class of the Maithil Brahmin community were categorized as Yogya by the King Harisimhadeva of Mithila due to their potential for better conduct.

== History ==
The sub-class of Yogya Brahmin was categorised in Panjis after the introduction of Panji system in Mithila. It was first coined by the King Harisimhadeva at his court during the 14th century CE.

The Brahmins belonging to this sub-class were traditionally engaged in Puja-path (God worship) till mid-day. They are also known as Joge Brahmins. They are well versed in three branches of Vedas and deeply immersed in the knowledge of Shastra. The name Joge is linked to the Joge-Van (presently known as Jagban) village, where the Yajnavalkya Ashram was situated in the ancient period.
