= Jay Mithila, Jay Maithili =

Cultural slogan of Mithila

"'Jay Mithila, Jay Maithili’" (Maithili: जय मिथिला, जय मैथिली) also written as Jai Mithila, Jai Maithili is a phrase translating to "Victory to Mithila, Victory to Maithili" or "Glory to Mithila, Glory to Maithili". It is used to express pride in the Mithila region and the language Maithili language. It is often used as a cultural and political rallying cry by Maithili-speaking people. It is also used as a greeting among Maithil people.

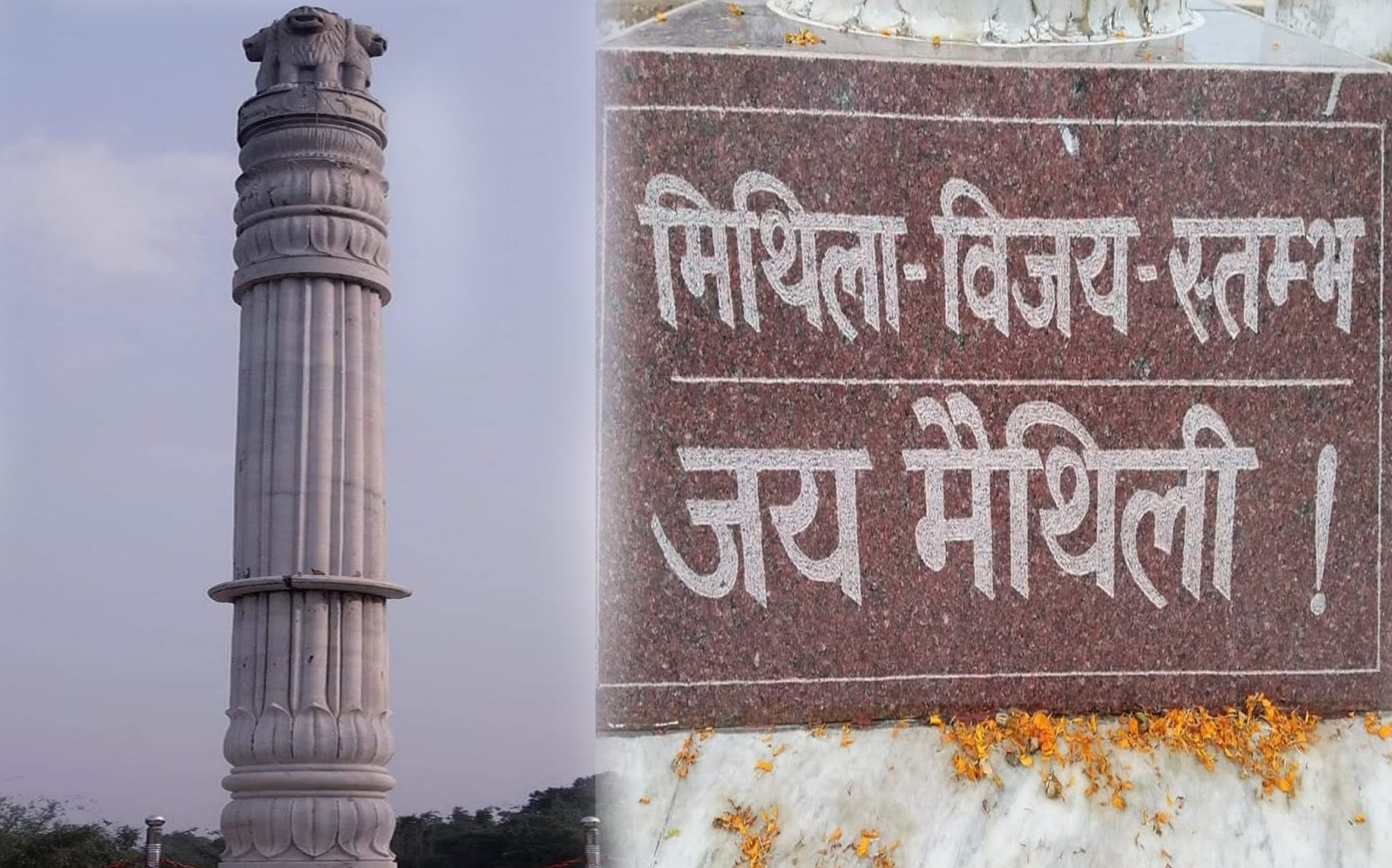
Image of the second part of the slogan, written Jay Maithili on the Mithila Vijay Stambh at Kandarpi Ghat in Mithila

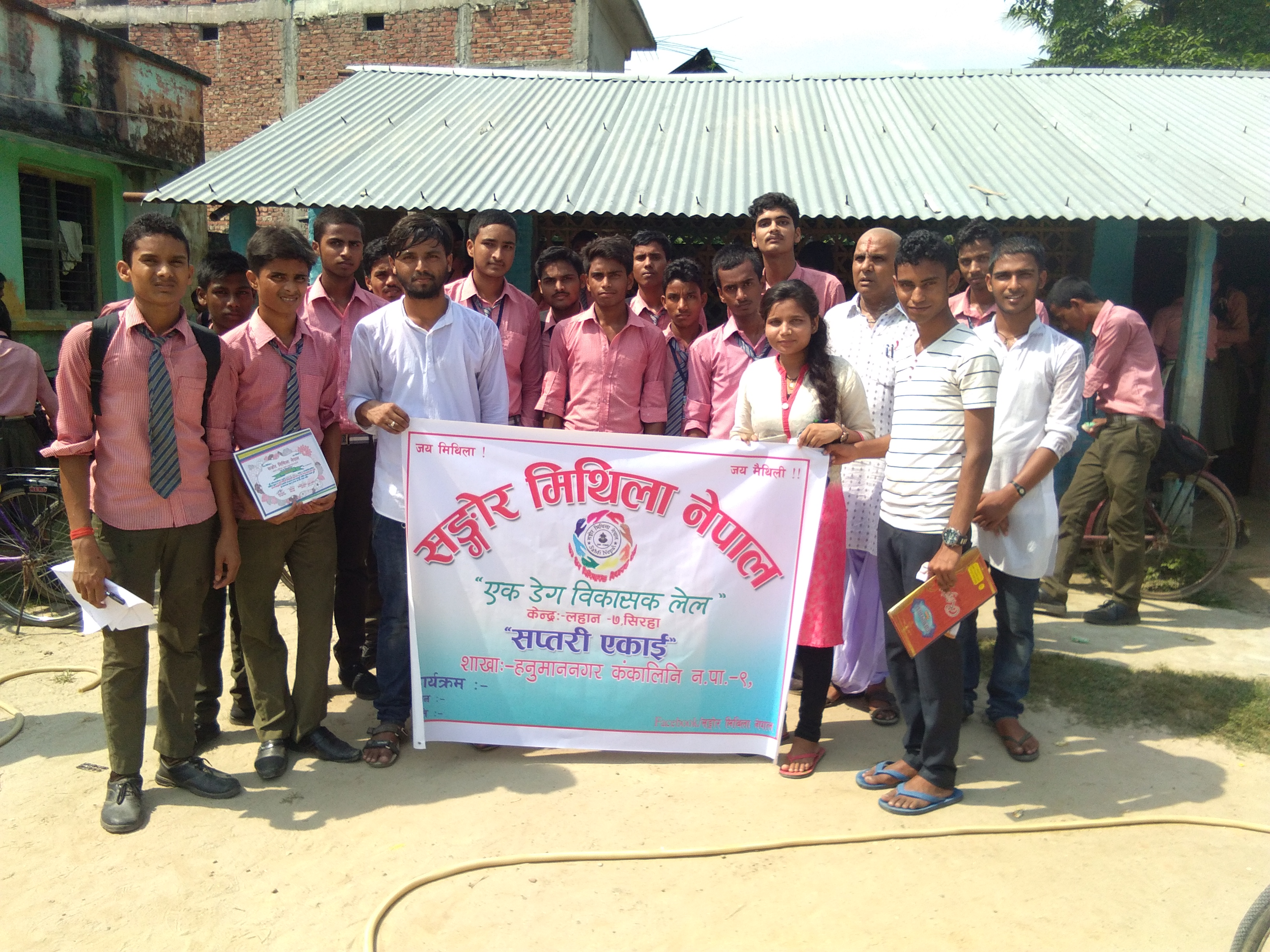
Slogan of Jay Mithila, Jay Maithili on the banner used at a local movement for the demand of development in region of Nepal part.

Its some alternative forms are Jay Mithile ! Jay Maithili ! or Jay Maithili, Jay Mithila.

== Etymology ==
The Sanskrit word "Jay" is translated as "triumph," "victory," or "rejoice". "Mithila" refers to the cultural region of Mithila in the Indian subcontinent. Similarly the term "Maithili" refers to the mother tongue of the cultural region. Together, "Jay Mithila, Jay Maithili" translates to "Victory to Mithila, Victory to Maithili" or "Hail Mithila, Hail Maithili".

== Description ==
The slogan is used a cultural greeting and patriotic slogan by the Maithili-speaking community to celebrate the cultural identity of the Mithila region in India and Nepal. It is used to strengthen Roti-Beti Ka Rishta, or the relations between India and Nepal, in the Mithila region. When a Maithil leader addresses a public gathering, the slogan is used to open and conclude the event. It helps leader to binds the people of the region in an emotional boundary.

In recent years, the phrase has been used in several Maithili songs. Beyond the region of the Indian subcontinent, the slogan of Jay Mithila , Jay Maithili along with the slogan Jay Mahakavi Vidyapati has got place at the international ceremony of the Vidyapati Parva Samaroh organised in the city of Frankfurt in Germany.

== Background ==
In the Indian subcontinent, the region of Mithila has its own unique cultural identity tracing back to the period of Ramayana and Vedas. Mithila has its mentioned as the Kingdom of Videha. According to the text Shatapatha Brahmana, it was established by the King Videgha Mathava. He was the disciple of the sage Gotama Râhûgana. Similarly, according to the epic text Ramayana, Nimi of the first King of Videha. His religious guru cum advisor was the Vedic sage Vashistha. His son was the King Mithi. He was the first Janaka of this dynasty. His religious guru and advisor was the Vedic sage Gautama. The name Mithila was derived from the name Mithi of the Janaka Dynasty. From his period the Kingdom of Videha was also called as Mithila. In the region of Mithila, Sanskrit and Maithili are the two major elite languages. Sanskrit language is the major language of the ritualistic literature in the region. Similarly, Maithili is major language of the local cultural literature in the region. The term Maithili is also used to signifies name of the princess Sita of the ancient kingdom. Thus, the phrase Jay Mithila, Jay Maithili symbolises the pride of the cultural identity of the region and its mother tongue Maithili as well as the salutations to Goddess Sita of Mithila.
