= Shaktisimhadeva =

King of Mithila from 1276 to 1296

- King of Mithila
- Reign: 1276–1296
- Coronation: 1285
- Predecessor: Ramasimhadeva
- Successor: Council of Ministers
- Son: Harisimhadeva
- Died: 1296
- House: Karnat Dynasty
- House: Mithila Kingdom
- Father: Ramasimhadeva
- Religion: Hinduism

Shaktisimhadeva (Maithili: शक्तिसिंहदेव) was the fifth King of the Karnat Dynasty in Mithila. He came into power in 1285 CE and succeeded his father King Ramasimhadeva.

== Early life ==
Shaktisimhadeva was born in the royal family of the Karnat Dynasty in the Mithila Kingdom. He was the son of the King Ramasimhadeva. Shaktisimhadeva was also known as Shakrasimha.

== Rule ==
According to the historical text Kirtipataka composed by the Maithil scholar Vidyapati, the period of the rule of the King Shaktisimhadeva in Mithila, is mentioned between 1276 CE to 1296 CE. He was contemporary to the Delhi Sultanate Allauddin Khilji.

In his regime, the eminent scholar Chandeshwar Thakur was appointed as the prime minister of the council of ministers in the kingdom. King Shaktisimhadeva died in the year 1296 CE. According to some scholars, after his death a council of ministers ruled the kingdom from 1296 CE to 1303 CE. The council of ministers ruled the kingdom for about seven years.
