= Oiniwar dynasty =

Dynasty of medieval India

Oiṇīvāra Tirhut Sarkar
- c. 1325–c. 1526
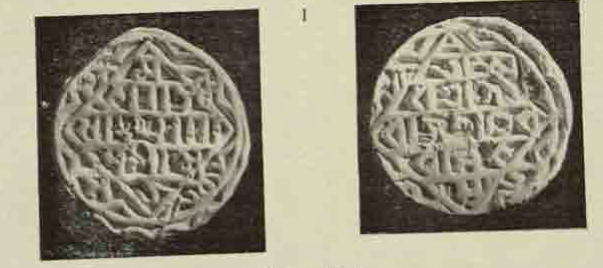
- Silver coin of Bhairavasimha from the period of his reign in the middle to late 15th century CE. Plate from Epigraphia Indica

- Approximate location of the Sugauna/Oiniwar dynasty in the 15th century as per A Historical Atlas of South Asia

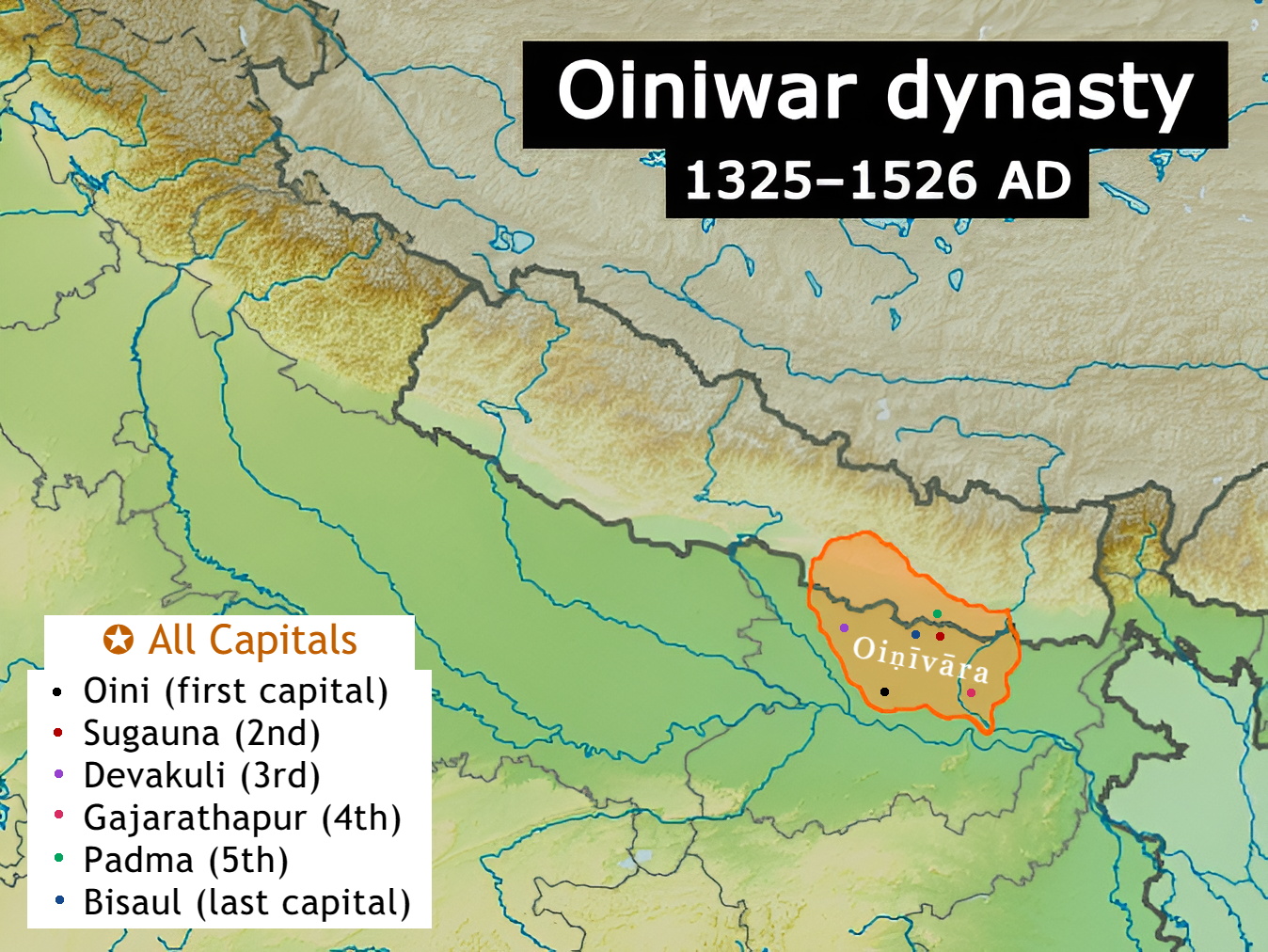
- Map of Oiniwar Dynasty with all capitals
- Status: Tributary state under the Jaunpur Sultanate (1460–1475); Partially subjugated by the Lodi dynasty (1496–1513)
- Capital: Oini; Sugauna; Devakuli; Gajarathapur; Padma; Bisaul
- Common languages: Maithii, Sanskrit
- Religion: Hinduism
- Demonym: Maithil
- Government: Monarchy
- King
  - 1325 CE: Kameshwar Thakur
- Historical era: Medieval India
  - Foundation: c. 1325
  - Founder: Oini Thakur or Nath Thakur
  - Disestablished: c. 1526
Preceded by
Karnat dynasty
Succeeded by
Bengal Sultanate
Lodi dynasty
Bettiah Raj

Part of a series on the
History of Bihar
Ancient History
Prehistoric and Vedic Era

- Chirand (Neolithic) - Vedic period - Videha - Mithila (ancient) - Anga - Kikata

Urbanisation and Shramana

- Second Urbanisation - Rise of Shramana - Buddhism • Jainism • Ajivika

Gaṇasaṅghas

- Magadha - Vajjika League

  - Nāya
  - Vajji (tribe)
  - Licchavis of Vaishali

- Malla (tribe) - Kashi - Bulis

Imperial Magadha

- Brihadratha dynasty - Haryanka dynasty

  - Bimbisara
  - Ajatashatru

- Shishunaga dynasty - Nanda Empire

  - Mahapadma Nanda

- Maurya Empire

  - Chandragupta Maurya
  - Ashoka
Post-Mauryan and Smriti

- Shunga Empire

  - Pushyamitra Shunga

- Kanva dynasty - Development of Smriti - Brahmanical Revival

The Interregnum

- Kushan Influence - Mitra Dynasty - Resurgence of Licchavis

Classical and medieval
The Classical Age

- Gupta Empire

Early Medieval

- Later Gupta dynasty - Maukharis

Pala Era and Feudatories

- Pala Empire - Khayaravala dynasty - Pithipatis of Magadha

Medieval Mithila

- Karnats of Mithila - Oiniwar dynasty

Islamic Incursions

- Delhi Sultanate

Centers of Learning

- Nalanda - Vikramashila - Odantapuri - Telhara monastery

Early-modern
Afghan and Mughal Rule

- Sur Empire

  - Sher Shah Suri

- Mughal Empire

  - Bihar Subah
Regional Chieftaincies

- Chakwars - Chero dynasty - Gidhaur chieftaincy - Kharagpur Raj - Khokhra chieftaincy

Major Zamindari Estates

- Bettiah Raj - Khandavala dynasty - Dumraon Raj - Hathwa Raj - Jagdishpur estate

Colonial & Independence Era
Colonial Rule (1764–1947)

- Battle of Buxar (1764) - East India Company - Permanent Settlement (1793) - Santhal rebellion - Indian Rebellion of 1857

  - Kunwar Singh

- Bihar famine of 1873–74 - Bihar Province (Est. 1912) - 1934 Nepal–Bihar earthquake

Freedom Struggle

- Champaran Satyagraha (1917) - Salt Satyagraha - Bihar Vidyapeeth - Kisan Sabha

  - Swami Sahajanand Saraswati

- Quit India Movement

  - Azad Dasta
Modern Era (Post-1947)
Congress Era (1947–1967)

- Sri Krishna Sinha - Anugrah Narayan Sinha - Zamindari Abolition

Socialist and JP Era (1967–1989)

- Karpoori Thakur - Bihar Movement (1974) - Jayaprakash Narayan - Bhagalpur riots (1989)

RJD Era (1990–2005)

- Lalu Prasad Yadav - Rabri Devi - Fodder Scam

State Division (2000)

- Bihar Reorganisation Act, 2000 - Creation of Jharkhand

NDA Era (2005–Present)

- Nitish Kumar - Politics of Bihar

Culture, art, and society
Art and architecture

- Mahabodhi Temple - Nalanda - Barabar Caves - Tomb of Sher Shah Suri - Rohtas Fort - Golghar - Mithila Painting - Patna Qalam - Manjusha Art - Didarganj Yakshi

Society and language

- Bihari culture - Mithila • Magadh • Anga - Bihari languages

  - Maithili • Magahi
  - Bhojpuri • Angika
Religion

- Religion in Bihar - Buddhism in Bihar - Jainism in Bihar - Islam in Bihar - Sikhism in Bihar

Portal India Portal Bihar

The Oiniwar dynasty or Oiṇīvāra dynasty, also known as the Sugauna dynasty, (Note: Other spellings include Oinwar and Sugona.) was a dynasty ruling territories that form part of the Mithila region of Bihar, India. They governed the area between 1325 and 1526, being preceded by the Karnat dynasty. (Note: The Karnat dynasty is also known by other names, including the Karnataka, Simroun, Simraun and the Dev dynasty.) Following the demise of the Oiniwars, emerged the dynasty of the Raj Darbhanga.

== History ==
The rulers of the Oiniwar dynasty governed Mithila between 1325 and 1526 however their rule has not been well-documented. They were Srotriya Maithil Brahmins whose first significant figure was Jayapati Thakur. His grandson, Nath Thakur, served the local kings of the Karnat dynasty and was rewarded with a grant of the village of Oini in modern-day Samastipur district in recognition of his scholarship. As was then customary, he took the name of the granted place as his own and the dynasty that followed from him became known as the Oiniwar.

There is an alternative theory that the family were generally considered to be significant scholars and that this reputation and the influence that flowed from it resulted in them being awarded the village of Sodapura, which later caused them also to be known as the Srotriyas or Soit.

In 1325, following the collapse of the Karnat dynasty in 1324, Nath Thakur became the first Oiniwar ruler. The dynasty that followed him comprised a further twenty rulers.

=== Demise ===
The last of the Oiniwar rulers was Laxminath Singh Deva.. He had been trying to assert himself as an independent ruler and in the process was assassinated by Nusrat Shah of Bengal. Following Laxminath Singh Deva's death there was a period of lawlessness in the region of Mithila lasting around 30 years where various Rajput clans were trying and battling for power. but after this finally emerged the Maithil Brahmin dynasty of the Raj Darbhanga who took the control of Mithila.

== Capitals ==
Unlike the Karnats who preceded them, who kept the large citadel of Simraungadh as their capital, the Oiniwars mainly operated out of various villages in Mithila.

The dynastic capitals were also frequently relocated. At some unknown time, it was moved from Oini to the village of Sugauna in modern-day Madhubani district, thus giving rise to the rulers also being known as the Sugauna Dynasty. It was moved again, to Devakuli, during the reign of Devasimha, and then to Gajarathpura (also known as Shiva Singhpura) during the early years of the reign of his son, Shivasimha. When the latter died in 1416, his queen, Lakshima, governed the kingdom for 12 years from Banauli Vidyapati Dih and then was succeeded by his brother, Padmasimha, who moved the capital once more to Padma, named after its founder, this was near to Rajnagar and a long way from the previous seat. Padmasimha, who ruled for three years, was succeeded by his wife, Vishwasa Devi, and she, too, founded a new capital which is today the village of Vishual.

== Military ==
The military of the Oiniwar dynasty was considered to be the main pillar of the King's power. The army was under the command of a senapati or the commander-in-chief who had direct control of the military. The military had a four-fold structure with infantry, cavalry, elephants and chariots. The poet, Vidyapati who worked in the court of the Oiniwars, noted that the core of the army consisted of Maithil Brahmin the vanguard consisted of mercenaries from Kurukshetra, Matsya, Surasena and Panchala.

In a battle with a Muslim Sultan during the reign of King Sivasimha, many different warriors were mentioned including Commander Suraja, Śri Śakho Sanehi Jha, Pundamalla Miśra who was an expert in archery and Rajadeva (Raut) who was considered to be a matchless warrior.

== Society ==
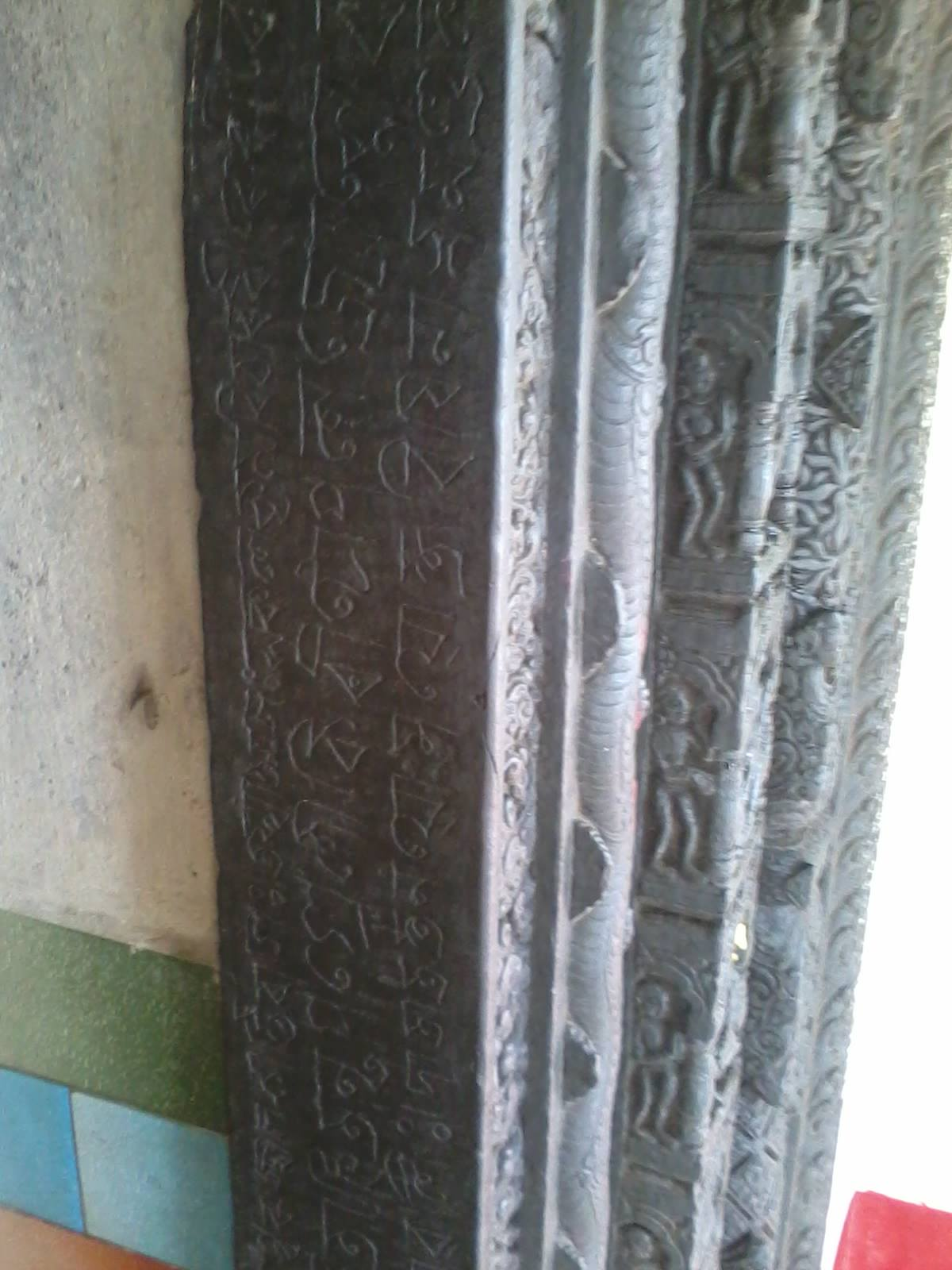
Inscription of King Narasimha of the Oinwar dynasty in the Tirhuta script at the Kandaha Sun Temple in Saharsa district, (c. 1435 A.D.)

The frequent moving of capitals and also the founding of new villages resulted in a range of new infrastructure financed by the dynasty, taking such forms as roads, temples, ponds and forts. In addition, the rulers were significant patrons of Maithili culture. Their era has been called the epitome of the Maithili language. The contributions of the poet and scholar Vidyapati, who flourished during the reign of Shiva Simha Singh, are particularly notable. This was a significant change from the Karnat era, whose rulers were not native to the area and which had been culturally stagnant.

=== Slavery ===
Multiple deeds of sale for the purchase of slaves have been found dating back to the fifteenth and sixteenth century in Mithila, during the rule of the Oiniwar dynasty which indicates that slavery was practiced during this period. These deeds were written on palm leaves and are in the Maithili language. A number of these deeds date back to the reign of Bhairavasimha and his name is indicated in the writing. One deed has also been found dating to the rule of Bhairavasimha's son, Ramabhadra.

Several intermediaries were generally used in the selling of slaves who helped to fix the price and witnesses were used to confirm the sale. Conditions were attached to the deed including that the slave was not allowed to flee and the owner had authorisation to bring the slave back even if they were to flee under the royal throne (rajasimhasanatalagatapi). The deeds for sale in Mithila would also indicate the tasks expected of the slave. Many of the deeds that have been recovered also indicate that individuals would have offered themselves up to be enslaved for a price.

== Historiography ==
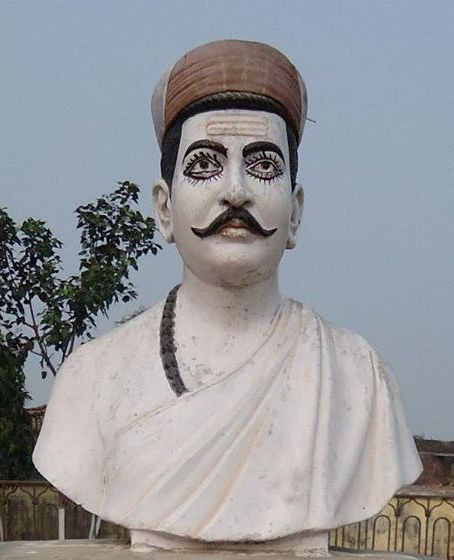
Statue of Vidyapati who was a poet in the Oiniwar court

The chief source of information regarding the Oiniwars is the writings of the poet, Vidyapati who served in the courts of seven kings and two queens belonging to the dynasty. The Kīrtilatā for example was a prose poem by Vidyapati which was commissioned by the Oiniwar king, Kirtisimha. Similarly, the Sanskrit text Shiva Sarvasvasara composed by Vidyapati on the request of the queen Vishwasa Devi provides the history of the dynasty. Other sources of information regarding the Oiniwars include inscriptions and mentions in local texts. One notable inscription is the Bhagirathpur inscription which was discovered in the village of Bhagirath in Darbhanga district on the stone frame of a temple. This inscription was left by Oiniwar king, Kansanarayana who is considered to be the last King of the Oiniwars. The inscription is useful as it provides a breakdown of his genaology.

=== Coinage ===
So far, coins of two rulers belonging to the Oiniwar dynasty have been discovered; Sivasimha and Bhairavasimha. Several gold coin specimens were recovered from the reign of Sivasimha in 1913. These gold coins bore the legend, Sri Sivasya and due to their limited number, it was likely that the coins were meant for limited circulation rather than for general use.

Bhairavasimha also issued silver coins in his name which were recovered from the village of Bairmo in Darbhanga district. These coins were examined by the historian and numismatist, Dineshchandra Sircar who deciphered the text as: mahārajā-śrī-Darppanārāyan-ātmaja-Tirabhukti-rāja-śri-Bhairavasimhasya. This translates to; "Bhairavasimha, Lord of Tirabhukti and son of Lord Darppanārāyana". These coins were likely issued in the fifteenth year of his reign roughly corresponding to 1489-1490.

== Rulers ==
A geneaology of the Oiniwars can be reconstructed as follows:

Ruling order	Name of the rulers
1	Kamesvara Thakkura
2	Bhogisvara Thakkura
3	Ganesvara Thakkura
4	Kirtisimha
5	Bhavesvara Thakkura
6	Devasimha
7	Shivasimha
8	Lakhimadevi (Queen)
9	Padmasimha
10	Visvasadevi (Queen)
11	Harisimha
12	Narasimha
13	Dhirasimha
14	Bhairavasimha
15	Rupanarayana Ramabhadrasimha
16	Kamsanarayana Laksminathasimha

== See also ==
- History of the Mithila region
