= Caṇḍeśvara Ṭhakkura =

Maithili-language author (died 1315)

- Born: 13th century Tirhut / Mithila
- Died: 1315
- Occupations: Minister of peace and war
- Title: Praśnacandesvara
- Parent: Virešvara
- Relatives: Jayadatta (cousin)

Caṇḍeśvara Thakkura (died 1315) was a Maithili-language political theorist and general during the 14th century. He served as minister for peace and war and chief judge in the court of Harisimhadeva who was the last King of the Karnat dynasty of Mithila. This dynasty ruled parts of modern-day Mithilanchal and Southern Nepal. His family had their origins in the village of Bisfi in modern-day Madhubani district.

== Family ==
Chandeshvar was born in a family of Maithil Brahmins who were also learned scholars who worked in the Karnat court. He was the cousin of Jayadatta who was the grandfather of Vidyapati who worked in the court of the Oiniwar dynasty a century after Candesvara's time. Candesvara was also the grandson of another scholar, Devāditya Ṭhakkura who was described as a "minister for War and Peace" in the court of the Karnat dynasty.

Candesvara most likely became a minister for peace and war for Harisimhadeva in 1310 C.E.

== Military career ==
Primary sources from the time describe him as a great diplomat and a successful minister cum commander who participated in battles against mlecchas (possibly referring to Muslim invaders).

He was also described as having rescued the earth from being flooded by Mlechchhas (possibly by defeating some Tughlaq generals) as well as leading a successful military expedition to Nepal where he is said to have distributed gold equal in weight to himself on the banks of the Bagmati River in 1314.

Under Caṇḍeśvara's leadership and with the support of the King Harisimhadeva, the Karnatas of Mithila launched an attack on Nepal in 1314. The Karnats made the city of Bhaktapur their focus and plundered the city. After this, they targeted the Lalitpur region.

== Literary works ==
Among his most notable works was the Rājanītiratnākara, a treatise on organising the state. Furthermore, he also wrote a set of seven books that dealt with issues relating to the law among other themes. These were titled the Krityaratnākara, Dānaratnākara, Vyavahāraratnākara, Śuddhiratnākara, Pūjāratnākara, Vivādaratnākara, and Gṛihastharatnākara. These books dealt with gratitude, philanthropy, conduct, purification, religious rituals, conflict and family life, respectively. Together, these books are referred to as Saptaratnākara (seven jewels).
