= Oini =

First capital of Oiniwar Dynasty in Mithila

Coordinates: 25°54′15″N 85°40′19″E

Oini ओईनी Vaini
- Village
- Waini
- Interactive map of Oini
- Country: India
- State: Bihar
- Region: Mithila region
- District: Samastipur
- Block: Pusa
- Capital of Tirhut Sarkar: 14th century
- Founder: King Oini Thakur
- Named for: Oini Thakkura
- Demonym: Maithil
- Origin village of Oiniwar Dynasty

Oini (Maithili: ओइनी) is a village in the Pusa block of the Samastipur district in Mithila region of Bihar, India. It is an important village in the history of the Mithila region in the Indian subcontinent. It was the origin village of the Oiniwar Dynasty in the ancient Mithila Kingdom. The historical village is presently known as Waini. It was established as the capital of the Oiniwar Dynasty by the first King Oini Thakur of the dynasty in the Mithila Kingdom.

== History ==
According to the historian Makhan Jha, there was a great scholar named Nath Thakur at the court of a Karnat king in Mithila. It is said that, for his scholarship he was gifted a village of name Oini by the king in daan (donation). Those days there was a tradition that a person rewarded with a gift of village by the king was usually came to be known after the name of that village. Therefore, the scholar Nath Thakur was also called as Oini Thakur. Later after the fall of Karnat Dynasty in Mithila, the scholar Oini Thakur became the ruler of the region. He established the Oiniwar Dynasty and became the first king from the Oiniwar Dynasty in Mithila. During the early period of the Oiniwar Dynasty, Oini was the court of the kingdom of Mithila.

The ruins of the court of the then kingdom still exists in the form of dih at the village. Nowadays the remains of the dih is found covered with bushes and trees. The ruins of the court is known as Waini Dih. In the recent period, some youths of the village established idol of Goddess Bhagwati at the dih and started worship there.
