= Shrotriya =

Sub-class in Maithil Brahmins

Shrotriya (Sanskrit: श्रोत्रिय) is a sub-class in the tradition of Maithil Brahmins. It is one of the four major sub-classes within the Maithil Brahmins community. These Brahmins are Maithil Agnihotris fully devoted to religious worships from the sunrise to the sunset. They are locally also called as Soit. During monarchy in the region, the kings were pleased to hear the deep faith of Shrotriyas in the Vedic Karmas. These Shrotriya Brahmins are regarded as high and novel class of Brahmins in the region. This class of Shrotriya Brahmins is mentioned in the text Ashtavakra Gita.

श्रोत्रियं देवतां तीर्थमङ्गनां भूपतिं प्रियम् ।

दृष्ट्वा सम्पूज्य धीरस्य न कापि हृदि वासना ॥

- śrotriyaṃ devatāṃ tīrthamaṅganāṃ bhūpatiṃ priyam .

dṛṣṭvā sampūjya dhīrasya na kāpi hṛdi vāsanā.

— Ashtavakra, Ashtavakra Gita, 18-54

== Etymology ==
The Indic term Shrotriya is derived from the root word Sruti. In the Vedic tradition, Sruti refers to the Samhita part of the Vedas.

== History ==
The history of the sub-class Shrotriya in the Maithil Brahmins community can be traced since the 14th century CE. It was graded by the King Harisimhadeva of the Karnat Dynasty in Mithila.
