= Maithil Brahmin =

Brahmin community of the Mithila region, India

मैथिल ब्राह्मण

Regions with significant populations
- Indian subcontinent

Sanskrit and Vedic learning in Mithila
- Jay Mithila, Jay Maithili

Languages
- Maithili, Angika Sanskrit

Religion
- Hinduism

Related ethnic groups
- Other Brahmin groups
- Chhathihar, Mundan and Maithil Upanayan are the mandatory sanskars among the Maithil Brahmins community

Maithil Brahmins are the Indo-Aryan Hindu Brahmin community originating from the Mithila region of the Indian subcontinent that comprises Tirhut, Darbhanga, Kosi, Purnia, Munger, Bhagalpur and Santhal Pargana divisions (Note: Santhal Pargana division is headquartered at Dumka and the cited source mentions the division as "Dumka division") of India and parts of Nepalese Terai. They are one of the five Pancha-Gauda Brahmin communities. The main language spoken by Maithil Brahmins is Maithili.

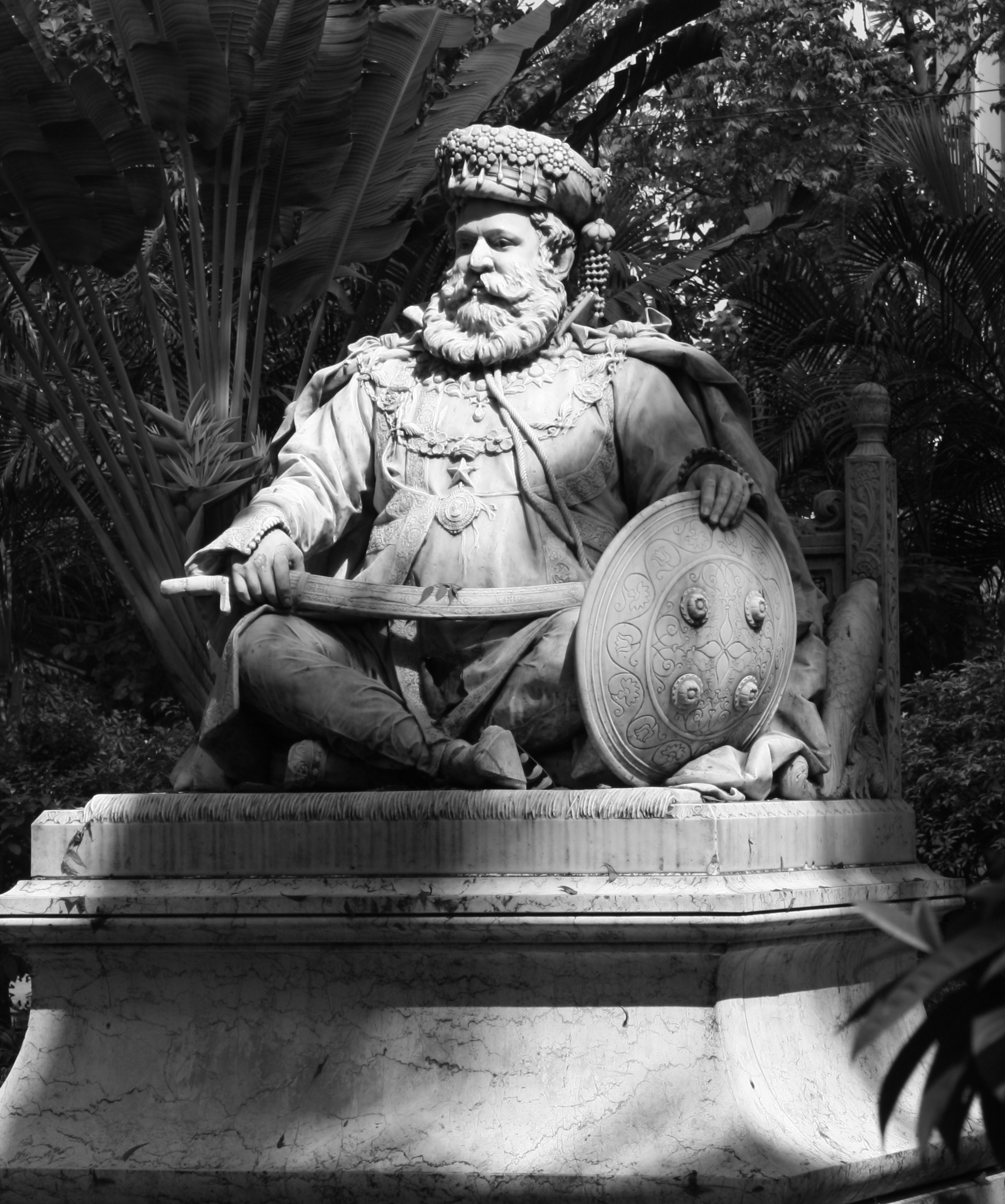
Maharaja Lakshmeshwar Singh, a Maithil Brahmin ruler of Raj Darbhanga

== Etymology ==
The term Maithil refers to the people of the Mithila region in the Indian subcontinent. The community of Brahmins originated from the ancient Kingdom of Mithila were called as Maithil Brahmins. The literal meaning of Maithil Brahmin is the Brahmin of Mithila desh. The Brahmins from Mithila have been known as Maithil Brahmins since ancient times, when Brahmins were first categorized into ten groups based on region.

== History ==
Some of the dynastic families of the Mithila region, such as the Oiniwar dynasty and Khandwal dynasty (Raj Darbhanga), were Maithil Brahmins and were noted for their patronage of Maithil culture.

In the 1960s and 1970s, the Maithil Brahmins became politically significant in Bihar. Binodanand Jha and Lalit Narayan Mishra emerged as prominent political leaders of the community. Under the Chief Ministry of Jagannath Mishra, many Maithil Brahmins assumed important political positions in Bihar.

== Divisions ==
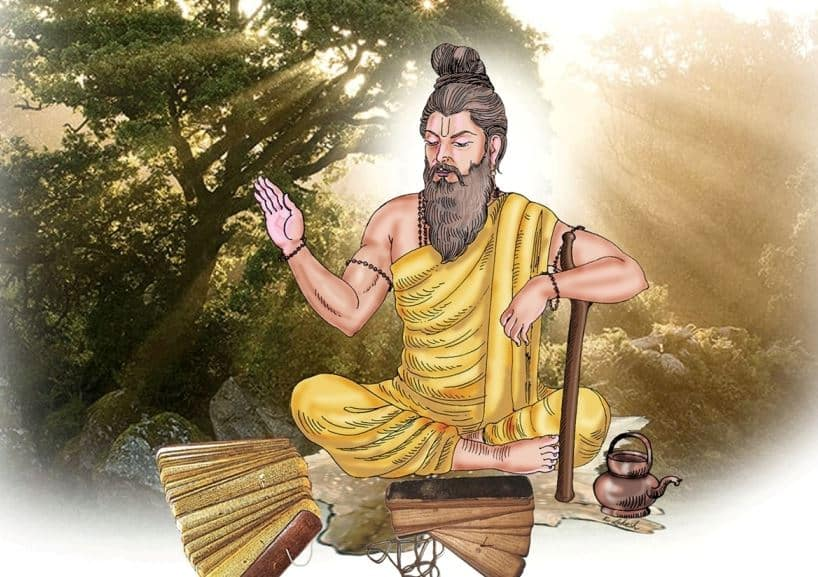
Gautama Rishi (Symbolic image) - The founder of Chhandog

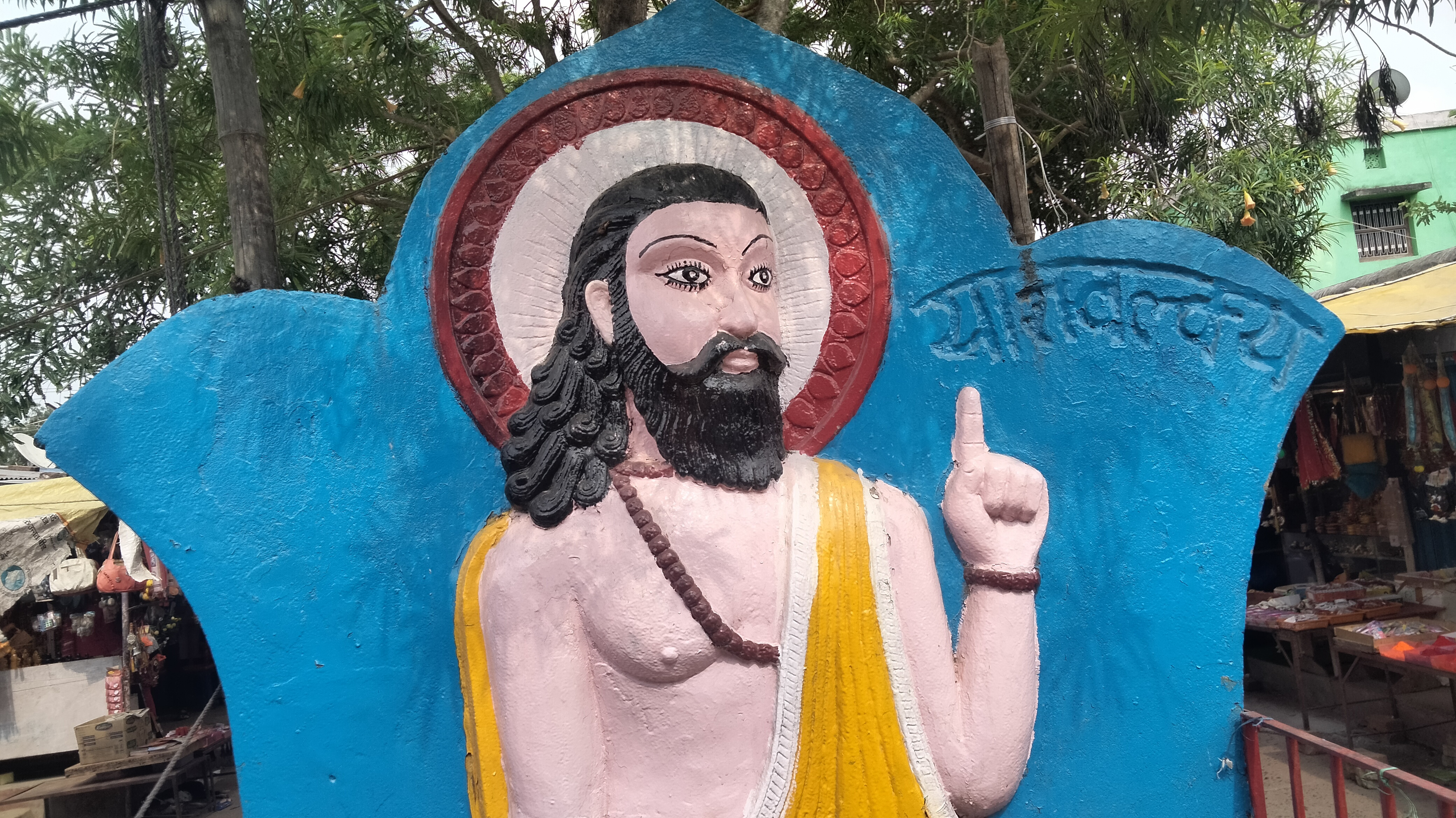
Statue of Yajnavalkya (At Uchchaith village) - Founder of Vajasaneyi

According to the Vedic Samhita, Maithil Brahmins are divided into the Vajasaneyi (Yajurvedic) and the Chandogya(Samavedic) and each group is strictly exogamous. Among the total number of Maithil Brahmins, around twenty five percent Brahmins belong to Chhandog and remaining belong to Vajasaneyi. They are also further classified by four main categories, the Shrotriyas (Soit), the Yogyas (Bhalmanush), the Painjas and the Jaiwars. They are also divided into various Mools or Clan's name. On the basis of mools, they are categorised into three classes. They are Atyant Shrestha, Dwitiya Shreni and Madhyammul. And every mool is further divided into upamool or sub clans called as Moolgram. Each mool is associated with its own Viji Purusha, who is the earliest known ancestor of the mool.

== Religious practices ==
They are mainly practitioners of Shaktism in various forms, however there are also Vaishnavites and Shaivites. A male child of Maithil Brahmin family gets the status of a Brahmin only after completion of the sacred ceremony Maithil Upanayan. The Maithil Brahmins also worship their family's own Kuldevta. There several Kuldevtas for different clans of them. Dharmaraj is a major Kuldevta among some groups of the Maithil Brahmins.

The rituals and procedures of the marriage between a Maithil Brahmins couple is practiced and performed according to the tradition of the Maithil Vivah in the region.

== Panjis ==
Panjis or Panji Prabandh are extensive genealogical records maintained among Maithil Brahmins similar to the Hindu genealogy registers at Haridwar. While marriage they obtain the “Aswajan”(Non-relative) certificate from the panjikars,this system was started by Harisinghdeva.

== See also ==
- Gotra
- List of Maithil Brahmins
- Durwakshat Mantra
- Maithil Upanayan
- Chaudhary post in Mithila
