= Gajarathapur =

Capital of mediaeval Mithila Kingdom

Gajarathapur गजरथपुर Shivasinghpur
- Historical village
- Siwaisinghpur
- Interactive map of Gajarathapur
- Country: India
- State: Bihar
- Region: Mithila
- District: Darbhanga
- Block: Hayaghat
- Founder: King Shivasimha
- Demonym: Maithil
- Capital of Mithila during the period of King Shivasimha (Oiniwar Dynasty)

Gajarathapur (Maithili: गजरथपुर) is a historical village in the Mithila region of Bihar in India. It was established as the capital of the mediaeval Mithila Kingdom by the King Shivasimha of the Oiniwar Dynasty. It is presently located in the Darbhanga district of Bihar. According to historians, during the period of the king Amritkar, the son of the famous king Chandrakar, he shifted his capital from Gajarathapur to Padma.

== History ==
Gajarathapur was established on the bank of the Bagmati River. The fort of the capital was built near the river bank. The river bank where the fort was built, is still known as Kilaghat. The literal meaning of the Indic term kila is fort. According to the book Mithila-Tatva-Vimarsh written by Mahamahopadhyaya Parmeshwar Jha, the village is also known Siwaisinghpur. It was also called as Shivasinghpur after the name of King Shivasimha.

Later, the capital was attacked by Mughals and a war was erupted between the King Shivasimha and the Mughals. It is said that the King Shivasimha either lost his life or got missing after the war. After this defeat, the capital of Gajarathapur was devastated, and anarchy prevailed in the region for some time. The queen Lakhimadevi and her Rajpandit Vidyapati along with some relatives of the royal family went to the court of Dronwar Puraditya in Raj Banauli (Banauli Vidyapati Dih) for asylum.

== Demographics ==
The village is presently known as Siwaisinghpur in the Hayaghat block of the Darbhanga district in Bihar. As of 2011, the number of families residing in this village is 316. The total population of the village is 1490, of which 796 are male while 694 are females.
