= Vishwasa Devi =

Queen of Mithila

- Queen of Mithila
- Ruler: 1431 CE - 1443 CE
- Predecessor: Padmasimha
- Successor: Harasimha
- Born: Vishwasa; Mithila
- Husband: Padmasimha
Names
- Viśvasadevi
Regnal name
- Maharani Vishwasa Devi
- House: Mithila Kingdom
- Dynasty: Oiniwar Dynasty
- Religion: Hinduism
- Occupation: Queen; Ruler of Tirhut Sarkar; Scholar of Sanskrit literature

Vishwasa Devi (Maithili: विश्वास देवी, Romanised: Viśvasadevi) was the queen of the Mithila Kingdom in the Oiniwar Dynasty during the 15th-century. She ascended the throne of the Mithila Kingdom after the death of the King Padmasimha. She ruled the kingdom for twelve years since 1431 CE to 1443 CE. She was the tenth ruler in the Oiniwar Dynasty of the Kingdom. Apart from being the ruler of the kingdom, she was also an eminent scholar of the Sanskrit literature.

== Later life ==
Her names in different historical documents are written with slightly different spelling. They are Vishwasa Devi, Viśvasadevi, Visvasadevi and Viswavasa Devi. She was married to the King Padmasimha of the Oiniwar Dynasty in Mithila. Padmasimha was the brother of the King Shivasimha in Mithila. After the marriage with King Padmasimha, she became the queen of the kingdom. The king Padmasimha later died in 1431 CE without having a child. Since the king was childless so after the death of the king, the queen Vishwasa Devi took control on the territory and ascended the throne of the kingdom in 1431 CE. She ruled the kingdom for 12 years till 1443 CE. She was the second queen in the Oiniwar Dynasty after the queen Lakhimadevi, who ascended the throne of the kingdom and ruled the territory.

== Rule and legacy ==
The queen Vishwasa Devi established a new village Visual in the kingdom after her name. Then she transferred the capital of the Mithila Kingdom from Padma to the newly established village Visual.

During her regime, she patronised the scholars in the kingdom. Her royal court became the centre for the gathering of eminent scholars just like the court of the King Janaka in Ramayana. She organised a notable Yajna known as Chatuscharan Yajna at her royal court where large numbers of scholars gathered. In the Yajna, fourteen hundred Mimansa scholars alone were invited by the queen Vishwasa Devi.

The queen Vishwasa Devi also patronised the Maithil scholar Vidyapati at her royal court. The Maithil scholar Vidyapati composed his literary work Saiva-Sarvasva-Sara on the behest of the queen Vishwasa Devi, which gives account of the histories of the kings of the Oiniwar Dynasty. The literary work Saiva-Sarvasva-Sara is attributed to the queen Vishwasa Devi and deals with the matters of worship of Lord Shiva. Similarly Vidyapati also composed another literary work attributed to the queen Vishwasa Devi known as Gangāvākyāvalī, which deals with the rituals and practices related to worship of the holy river Ganges.

Vishwasa Devi as a queen was a powerful leader of men. Similarly as a scholar she was a champion of defeating many great scholars of her age. She was also compared with the Upanashadic woman scholar Brahmvadini Gargi Vachaknavi for her scholarly wisdom.
