= Padmasimha =

King of Oiniwar Dynasty in Mithila

- King of Mithila
- Predecessor: Lakhimadevi
- Successor: Vishwasa Devi
- Born: Padma; Mithila
- Spouse: Vishwasa Devi
- Kingdom: Mithila Kingdom
- Kingdom: Tirhut Sarkar
- Dynasty: Oiniwar Dynasty
- Father: Devasimha
- Religion: Hinduism
- Occupation: King of Mithila

Padmasimha (Maithili: पद्म सिंह) was the ninth king of the Oiniwar Dynasty in the Mithila Kingdom of the Indian subcontinent during 15th century CE. He ascended the throne of the Mithila Kingdom in 1428 CE after the death of the ruler queen Lakhimadevi. He was the brother of the popular King Shivasimha.

== Early life ==
Padmasimha was born in the royal family of the Oiniwar Dynasty in Mithila. He was the younger son of the King Devasimha. He was a Maithil Brahmin and belonged to Kashyapgotra.

== Rule ==
Padmasimha established a new village known as Padma after his name in the kingdom. Then he made the new village Padma as his capital. The site of the capital is presently known as Dharaharba Dih. He was a great warrior as well as a donar. The period of the regime of the King Padmasimha varies from three years to six years in different historical documents.
