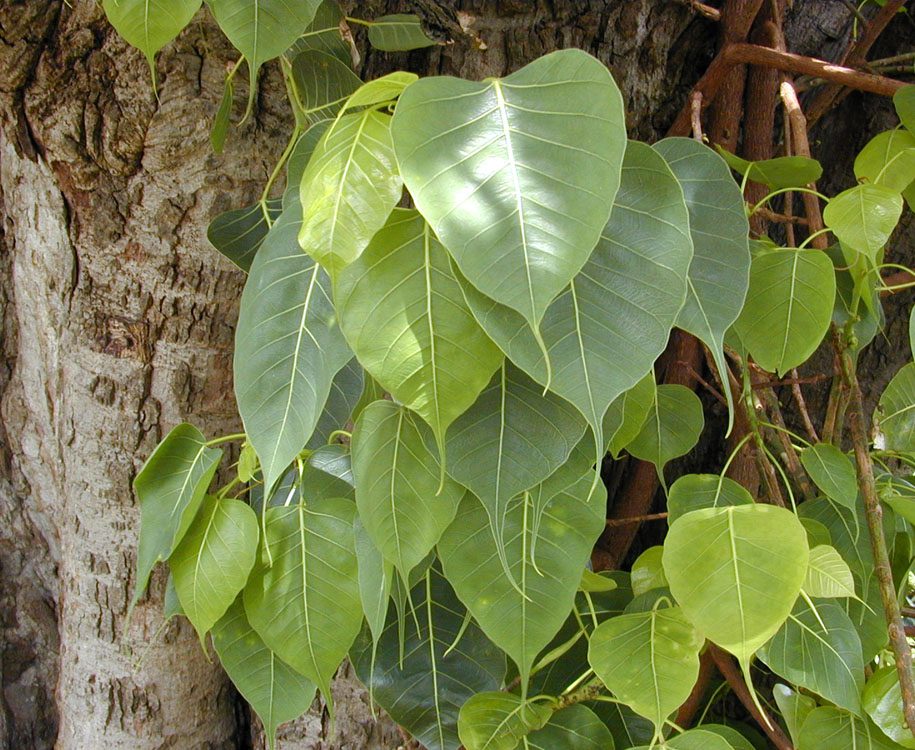
- The tree trunk and distinctive heart-shaped leaves

Scientific classification
- Kingdom: Plantae
- Clade: Tracheophytes
- Clade: Angiosperms
- Clade: Eudicots
- Clade: Rosids
- Order: Rosales
- Family: Moraceae
- Genus: Ficus
- Subgenus: F. subg. Urostigma
- Species: F. religiosa

Binomial name
- Ficus religiosa L.

Synonyms
- Urostigma religiosum (L.) Gasp.; Ficus caudata Stokes; Ficus peepul Griff.; Ficus religiosa var. cordata Miq.; Ficus religiosa var. rhynchophylla Miq.; Ficus rhynchophylla Steud.; Ficus superstitiosa Link; Urostigma affine Miq.

= Ficus religiosa =

Sacred fig

Species of fig

Ficus religiosa or sacred fig is a species of fig native to the Indian subcontinent and Indochina that belongs to the fig and mulberry family Moraceae. It is also known as the bodhi tree, bo tree, peepul tree, peepal tree, pipala tree or ashvattha tree (in Bangladesh, India and Nepal). The sacred fig is considered to have religious significance in four major religions that originated on the Indian subcontinent: Hinduism, Buddhism, Sikhism and Jainism. Hindu and Jain ascetics consider the species to be sacred and often meditate under it. Gautama Buddha is believed to have attained enlightenment under a tree of this species. The sacred fig is the state tree of the Indian states of Odisha, Bihar and Haryana.

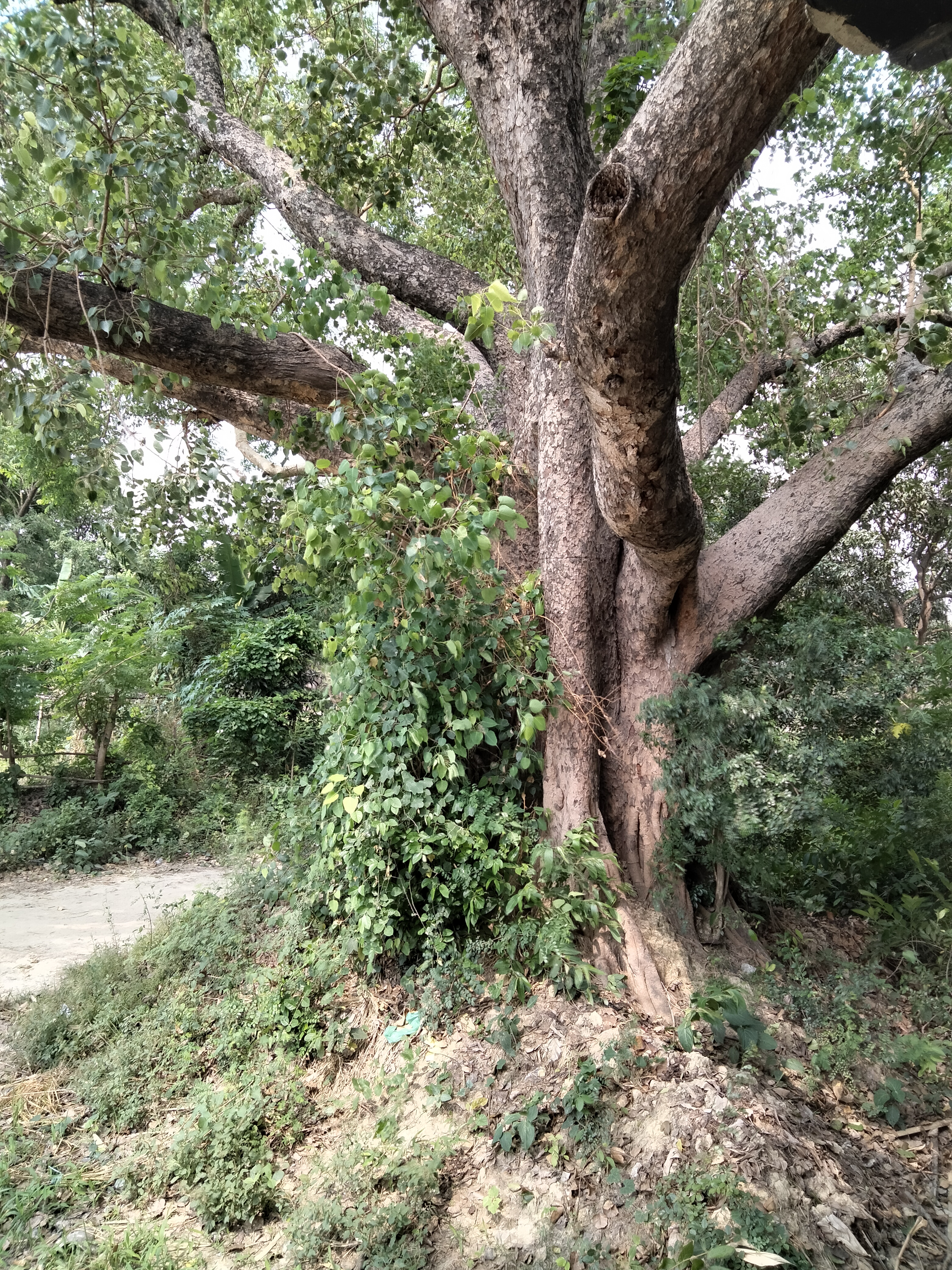
Ficus religiosa is called pipar gaachhi in the Mithila region. This picture was taken at Durga Mandir campus in Banauli village, Nepal.

== Description ==
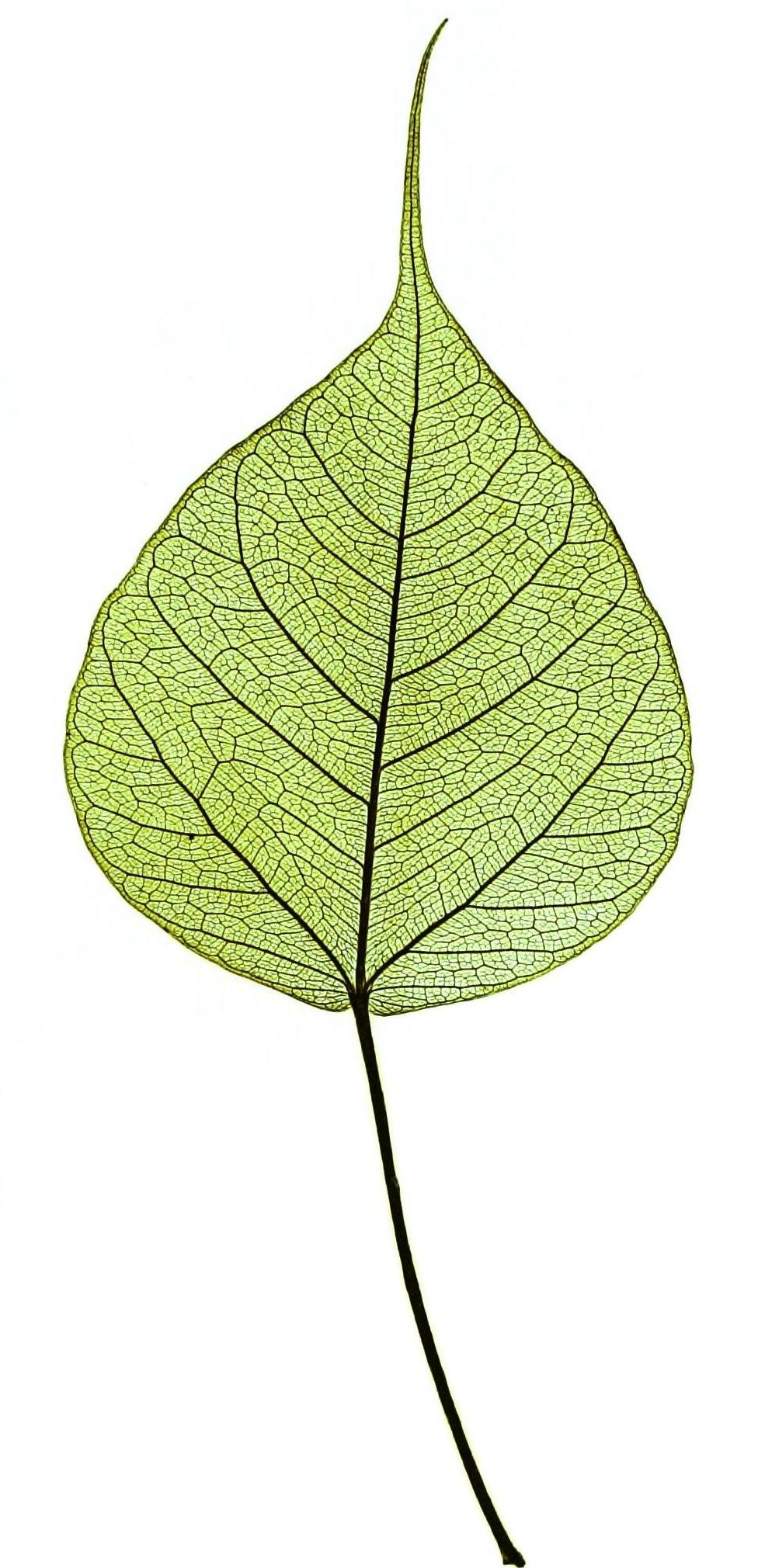
Nature printed leaf, showing shape and venation

Ficus religiosa is a large dry season-deciduous or semi-evergreen tree up to 30 m (98 ft) tall and with a trunk diameter of up to 3 m (9.8 ft). The leaves are cordate in shape with a distinctive extended drip tip; they are 10–17 cm (3.9–6.7 in) long and 8–12 cm (3.1–4.7 in) broad, with a 6–10 cm (2.4–3.9 in) petiole. The fruits are small figs 1–1.5 cm (0.39–0.59 in) in diameter, green ripening to purple.

The Jaya Sri Maha Bodhi tree in the city of Anuradhapura in Sri Lanka is estimated to be more than 2,250 years old.

== Distribution ==
Ficus religiosa is native to most of the Indian subcontinent – Bangladesh, Bhutan, Nepal, Pakistan and India including the Assam region, Eastern Himalaya and the Nicobar Islands, as well as part of Indochina – the Andaman Islands, Thailand, Myanmar and Peninsular Malaysia. It has been widely introduced elsewhere, particularly in the rest of tropical Asia, but also in Iran (Balochistan), Florida and Venezuela.

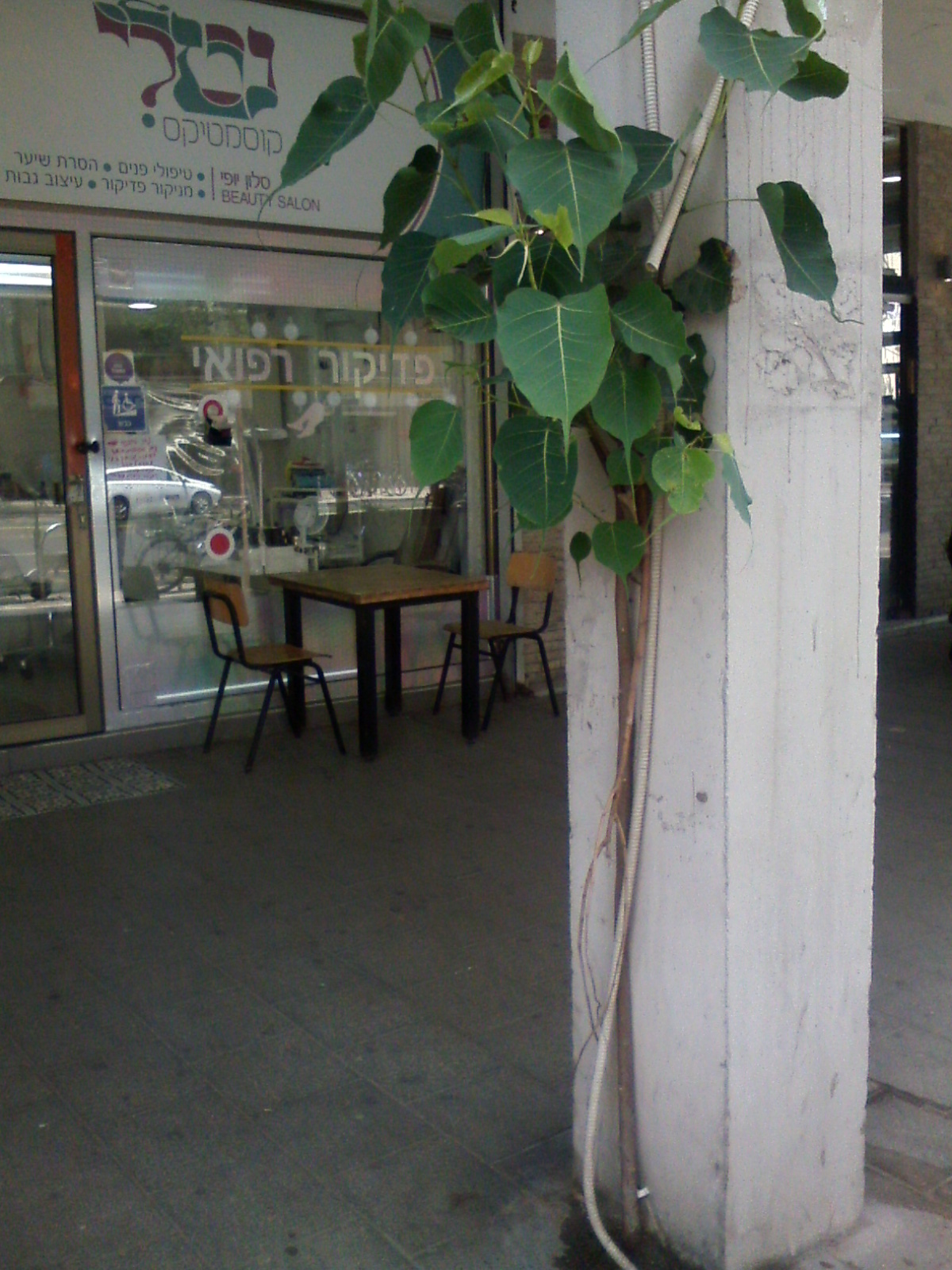
On a sidewalk in Israel

== Ecology ==
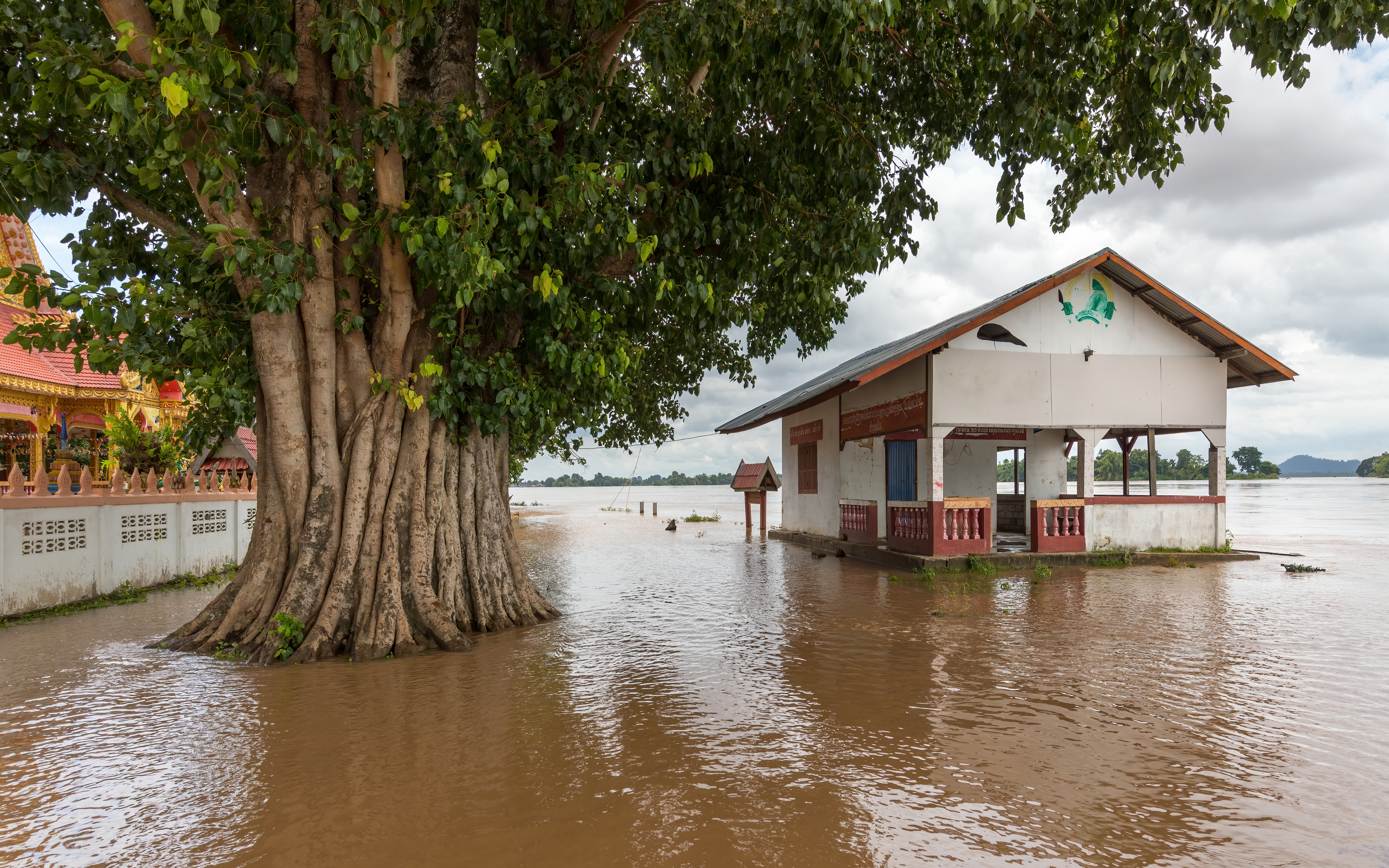
Flooded Ficus religiosa trunk in the muddy water of the Mekong, in Laos

Ficus religiosa suitably grows at altitudes ranging from 10 m (33 ft) up to 1,520 m (4,990 ft). Due to the climatic conditions which are prevalent throughout different heat zones, it can grow at latitudes ranging from 30°N to 5°S. It can tolerate air temperatures ranging between 0 to 35 °C (32 to 95 °F), beyond this upper limit its growth diminishes. It grows on a wide variety of soils but preferably needs deep, alluvial sandy loam with good drainage. It is also found on shallow soils including rock crevices.

=== Association ===
Ficus religiosa is associated with Blastophaga quadriceps, an agaonid wasp which acts as its pollinator as this wasp lays its eggs only on trees of this species.

=== Environment ===
Ficus religiosa is tolerant to various climate zones (Köppen climate classification categories of Af, Am, Aw/As, Cfa, Cwa and Csa) and various types of soils. In Paraguay the tree species occurs in forests at lower elevations, and in China the species has been reported growing at altitudes ranging from 400 to 700 m (1,300 to 2,300 ft). In India, being a native species, it occurs both naturally in wild as well as cultivated up to altitudes of 1,520 m (4,990 ft).

=== Climate ===
Ficus religiosa is tolerant to widely varying climatic conditions such as Tropical rainforest climate where the region receives more than 60 millimetres (6.0 cm) of precipitation per month, Tropical monsoon climate where average precipitation ranges from 60 millimetres (6.0 cm) in the driest month to 100 millimetres (10 cm), Tropical savanna climate with dry summer where average precipitation ranges from 60 millimetres (6.0 cm) per month in summers to 100 millimetres (10 cm) per month in winters, Tropical savanna climate with dry winter where average precipitation ranges from to 60 millimetres (6.0 cm) per month in winters to 100 millimetres (10 cm) per month in summers, Warm temperate climate with dry winter where average temperature ranges from 0 to 10 °C (32 to 50 °F) and winters are dry, as well as Warm temperate climate with dry summer where average temperature ranges from 0 to 10 °C (32 to 50 °F) and summers are dry.

=== Invasiveness ===
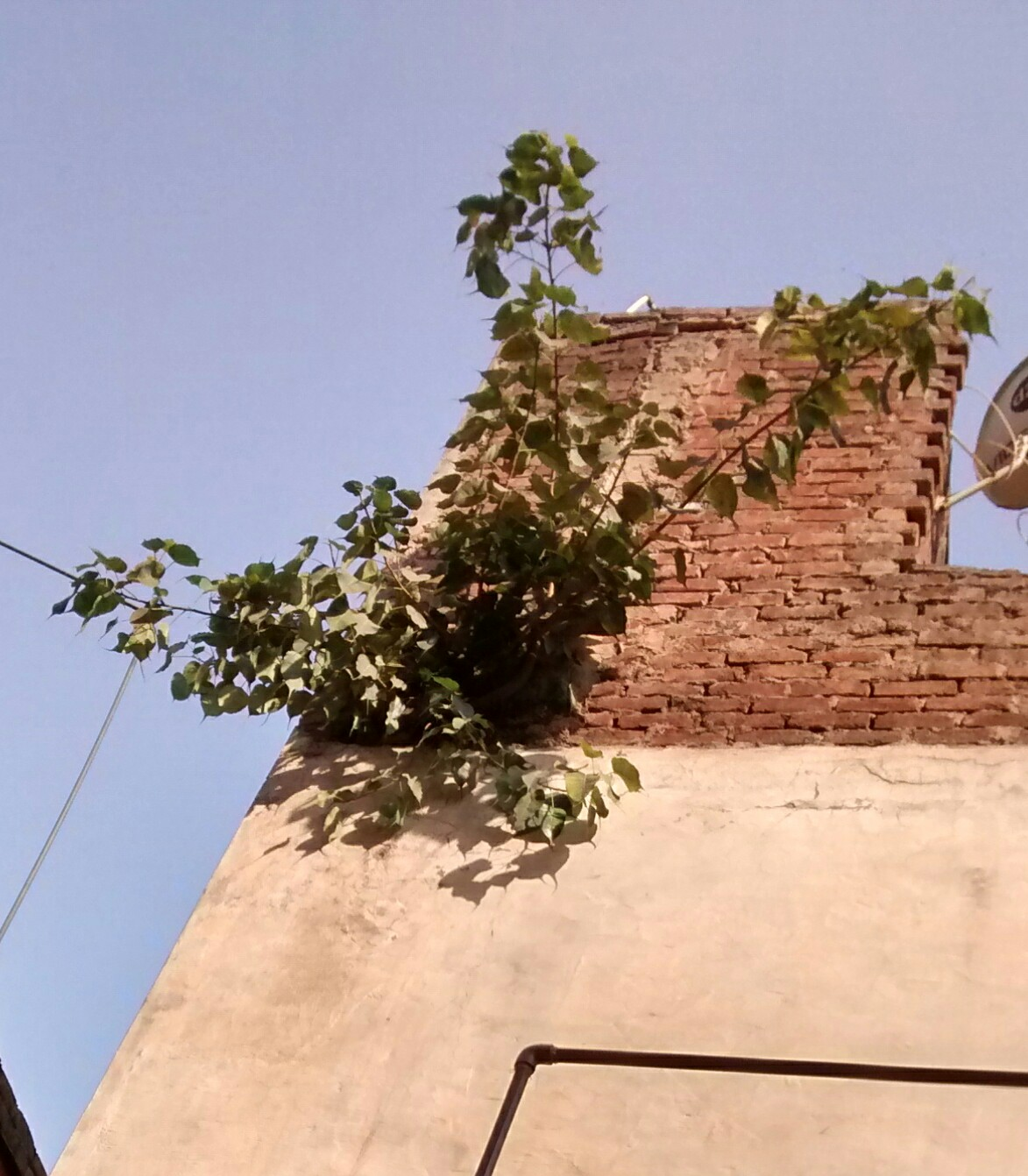
A young tree growing on a concrete wall in Delhi. It is tolerant to wide variety of soils, and hence it even thrives on concrete walls having little moisture.

Unlike most epiphytic jungle figs, which encircle the stems of dicotyledonous support trees from the outside, the epiphytic bushes of F. religiosa are not true stranglers. Instead, their roots penetrate the stem of the support tree, eventually splitting it from within. Ficus religiosa has been listed as an "environmental weed" or "naturalised weed" by the Global Compendium of Weeds (Randall, 2012). It has been assigned an invasiveness high risk score of 7 in a risk assessment prepared for the species' invasiveness in Hawaii by PIER. Such a high score predicts it will become a major pest in suitable climate zones. The major reasons for its invasive behaviour are its fast-growing nature, tolerance to various climate zones and soil types, reported lifespan of over 3,000 years, and its suffocating growth habit as it often begins life as an epiphyte.

== In culture and heritage ==
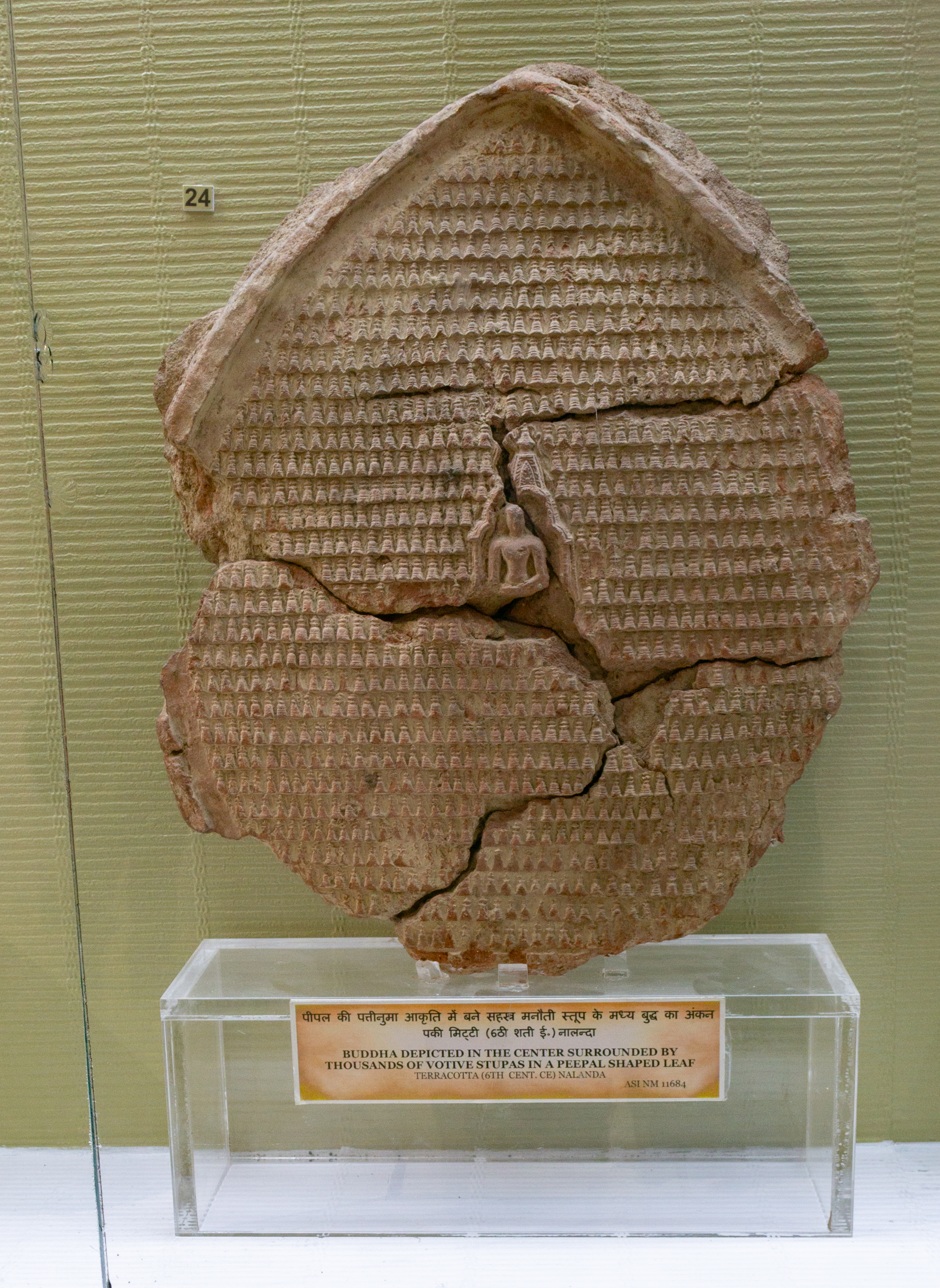
Peepal Leaf shaped terracotta plaque

The earliest known record of Ficus religiosa in human culture is the use of peepal leaf motifs in seals and pottery dating back to third millennium BCE. Large bowls decorated on the internal surface with stylized pipal leaves arranged in large volutes have been found at Nausharo, such bowls are particularly numerous.

The Indus Valley Civilisation venerated this tree and its leaf and drew religious art of it.

In India, the medal for the highest civilian award, Bharat Ratna, is modelled on the leaf of a Peepal tree.

=== Buddhism ===
Gautama Buddha attained enlightenment (bodhi) while meditating underneath a Ficus religiosa. The site is in present-day Bodh Gaya in Bihar, India. The original tree was destroyed, and has been replaced several times. A branch of the original tree was rooted in Anuradhapura, Sri Lanka in 288 BCE and is known as Jaya Sri Maha Bodhi; it is the oldest living human-planted flowering plant (angiosperm) in the world.

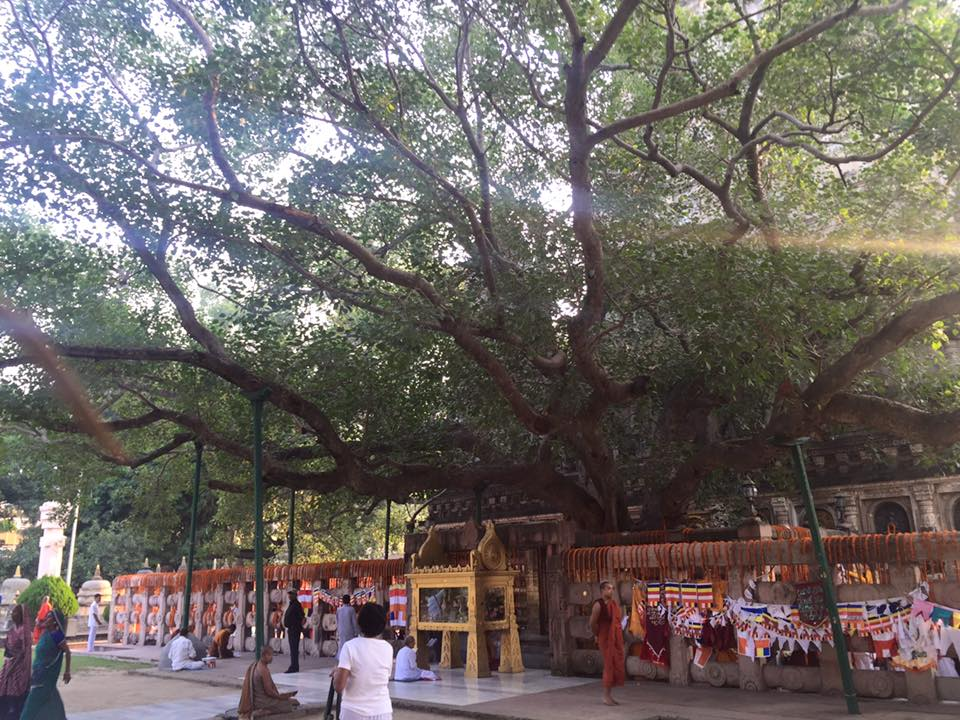
The Bodhi Tree at the Mahabodhi Temple was propagated from the Sri Maha Bodhi, which in turn was propagated from the original Bodhi Tree at this location.

In Theravada Buddhist Southeast Asia, the tree's massive trunk is often the site of Buddhist or animist shrines. Not all Ficus religiosa are ordinarily called a Bodhi Tree. A true Bodhi Tree is traditionally considered a tree that has as its parent another Bodhi Tree, and so on, until the first Bodhi Tree, which is the tree under which Gautama is said to have gained enlightenment.

=== Hinduism ===
Ashwattha is the Sanskrit term for Ficus religiosa. According to Hindu scriptures, it is a sacred tree for the Hindus and has been extensively mentioned in texts pertaining to Hinduism, for example as peepul in Rig Veda mantra I.164.20. However, according to Padma Puran peepal tree is the form of Lord Vishnu along with banyan and plaksha as the form of Lord Shiva and the lord Brahma. As:

"There is no doubt that lord Viṣṇu is of the form of Aśvattha, Vaṭa is Rudra's form, and Palāśa has taken up Brahmā's form. Seeing, worshipping and serving them is said to remove sins. These certainly destroy grief, diseases and the wicked."

— Padma Puran Uttar Khand ch. 115 22/23

Sadhus (Hindu ascetics) meditate beneath sacred fig trees, and Hindus do pradakshina (circumambulation, or meditative pacing) around the sacred fig tree as a mark of worship. Usually seven pradakshinas are done around the tree in the morning time chanting "vriksha rajye namah" (वृक्षराज्ञे नमः), meaning "salutation to the king of trees". It is claimed that the 27 stars (constellations) constituting 12 houses (rasis) and 9 planets are specifically represented precisely by 27 trees—one for each star. The Bodhi Tree is said to represent Pushya (Western star name γ, δ and θ Cancri in the constellation Cancer).

Adi Shankara derives it from shva (tomorrow) and stha (that which remains). Ashva (horse) and stha (situated), meaning where horses are tied, is another derivation.

Yama, while instructing Naciketa describes the eternal Asvattha tree with its root upwards, and branches downwards, which is the pure immortal Brahman, in which all these worlds are situated, and beyond which there is nothing else (Katha Upanishad Verse II.iii.1). Meanwhile, Krishna says that the Asvattha tree having neither end nor beginning nor stationariness whatsoever has its roots upwards and branches downwards whose branches are nourished by the Gunas and whose infinite roots spread in the form of action in the human world which though strong are to be cut off by the forceful weapon of detachment to seek the celestial abode from which there is no return (Bhagavad Gita XV.1-4). The former teaches that the Asvattha tree is real being identical with Brahman and therefore impossible to cut-off; the latter insists that the Asvattha tree must be regarded as unreal being identical with existence which needs to be cut-off.

== Cultivation ==
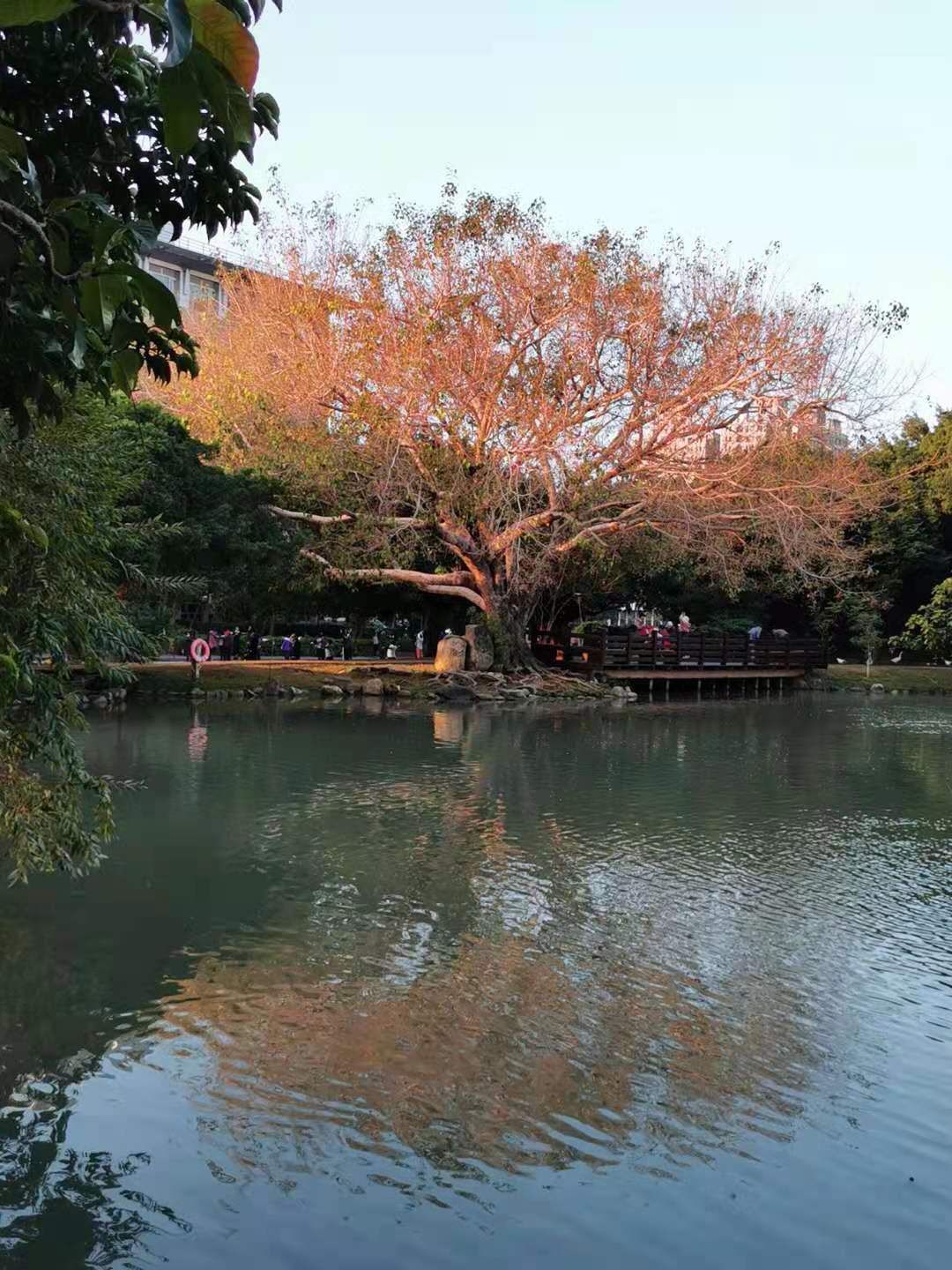
Ficus religiosa taken in early winter

Ficus religiosa is grown by specialty tree plant nurseries for use as an ornamental tree, in gardens and parks in tropical and subtropical climates. Peepul trees are native to Indian subcontinent and thrive in hot, humid weather. They prefer full sunlight and can grow in all soil types, though loam is the best. When planting, use soil with a pH of 7 or below. While it is possible for the plant to grow indoors in a pot, it grows best outside. Young peepul needs proper nourishment. It requires full sunlight and proper watering. Sacred fig occurs naturally in submontane forest regions. As with many Ficus trees, these are well suited for Bonsai training.

In the Middle East, it is preferably planted as an avenue or road verge tree. In the Philippines and in Nicaragua the species is cultivated in parks and along roadsides and pavements, while in Paraguay it occurs in forests at lower elevations.

In Thailand โพ or "Pho" trees grow everywhere, but in the wats (temples) they are revered, and usually are several hundred years old, with trunks up to 6 m (20 ft) wide. As with all sacred trees in Thailand, they have a saffron cloth wrapped around the base. A yearly ritual involving the bo trees at wats is the purchasing of "mai kam sii" ไม้คำ้ศริ, which are "supports" that look like crutches and are placed under the spreading branches as if holding them up. The purchase money helps fund the wat, a central part of Thai life.

== Uses ==
Ficus religiosa is used in traditional medicine for about fifty types of disorders including asthma, diabetes, diarrhea, epilepsy, gastric problems, inflammatory disorders, infectious and sexual disorders.

The trunk of this tree is used by farmers as a soil leveller. After seed harvesting, the rectangular trunk is connected to tractors and levels the soil.

== See also ==
- Bodhi Tree
- Ficus Ruminalis
- Shitala Devi
