= Shaiva Sarvasvasara =

Shaivism Sanskrit treatise of Vidyapati

- शैवसर्वस्वसार

Information
- Religion: Hinduism
- Author: Vidyapati
- Language: Sanskrit
- Period: 14th century CE
- Verses: 2507
- Śambhu-vākyāvali
- Dharmaśāstra by Vidyapati in the tradition of Shaivism in Mithila.

Shaiva Sarvasvasara (Sanskrit: शैवसर्वस्वसार, Romanised: Śaivasarvasvasāra) is a Sanskrit treatise dedicated to the worships of Lord Shiva in Hinduism. It was composed by the great Maithili poet Vidyapati in Mithila. It was composed by the request of the Maharani Vishwas Devi in the Oiniwar dynasty of Mithila. It is a 14th century CE Sanskrit ascetic text devoted to Lord Shiva. It provides the codes of conduct and process or rituals of Lord Shiva's worships. It is known as the Dharmashastra of Vidyapati.

It is also called as Śambhu-vākyāvali. It is an encyclopaedia of the Shaiva cult in Hinduism. The text is attributed to the queen Vishwas Devi, the wife of King Padmasimha.

== History ==
The Maithil poet Vidyapati in his writings had mentioned that the text of Shaiva Sarvasvasara was composed by the command of the queen Vishwasa Devi. According to historical documents, Vishwasa Devi was herself a scholar. She was a devotee of Lord Shiva. The text Shaiva Sarvasvasara is the compilation of her own eulogy towards Lord Shiva. She commanded her court advisor Vidyapati to composed a text consisting her eulogy towards Lord Shiva. After that Vidyapati compiled citations from the ancient scriptures and composed the text of Shaiva Sarvasvasara . He was the compiler of all the citations from the ancient scriptures related to Lord Shiva in Hinduism.

== Contents ==
The text of Shaiva Sarvasvasara consists of 2507 Sanskrit verses. Apart from the devotion of Lord Shiva, it also provides the history of the Oiniwar dynasty in Mithila.

In the text, the process of making Parthiva Shivalingas from mud and soil is described in details. It is used during the rituals of the Parthiva Shivalingas Puja in the region.
