= Padma Village =

Village in Bihar

Coordinates: 26°34′38″N 86°14′24″E

Padma
- Village
- Padma Gram Panchyat
- Interactive map of Padma
- Country: India
- State: Bihar
- Region: Mithila region
- District: Madhubani district
- Block: Ladania
- Founder: King Padmasimha
- Named for: King Padmasimha
- Demonym: Maithil
- Capital of Mithila during the period of King Padmasimha in Oiniwar Dynasty

Padma is a historical village in the Mithila region of Indian subcontinent. It is situated in the Ladania block of the Madhubani district in the state of Bihar in India. According to historical documents, the village was founded by King Padmasimha of the Oiniwar Dynasty in Mithila. King Padmasimha established his capital of the kingdom at the village of Padma. The village is close to the Indo-Nepal international border. Presently the village is connected by the National Highway 227 with other parts of the country.

== Dharaharba Dih ==
The Dharaharba Dih is an archaeological site in the village. It was the royal palace of the King Padmasimha when he established the village as his capital. The history of the Dharaharba Dih is mentioned in the text Mithila Mahatmya. In the revenue office, it is situated in the account number 563 with Khasra number 3128 of the Padma village. There were two historical ponds next to the dih called as Gangasagar Pokhair and Dangrahi Pokhair. These ponds were used by the royal family members to play water sports and swimming. Presently the ponds have been encroached by the villagers. They have gradually converted the ponds into fertile land.

== History ==
The Maithili poet Vidyapati also lived in the village for a certain period. After the death of the queen Lakhimadevi in the capital Banauli during her asylum at the court of the King Puraditya, the poet came to live in the Padma village, which was the capital of the King Padmasimha in the Oiniwar Dynasty.
