= Dekuli =

Historical village in Bihar

Dekuli देकुली Devakuli
- Village
- Devakuli
- Interactive map of Dekuli
- Country: India
- State: Bihar
- Region: Mithila
- District: Darbhanga
- Block: Bahadurpur
- Panchayat: Tikapatti-Dekuli
- Founder: King Devasimha
- Named for: Devasimha
- Demonym: Maithil

Languages
  - Official: Mother tongue: Hindi; Maithili

Dekuli (Maithili: देकुली) also known as Devakuli is a historical village in the Mithila region of Bihar in India. It is located in the Bahadurpur block of the Darbhanga district in Bihar. In the 14th century CE, it was the capital of the Mithila Kingdom during the King Shivasimha of Oiniwar Dynasty. Presently the village is the part of Bahadurpur Dekuli Panchayat. The village holds several archeological sites and remains of different centuries.

== History ==
Dekuli or Devakuli was founded by the King Devasimha of the Oiniwar Dynasty in Mithila. It was established as the capital of the kingdom and named after him.

== Etymology ==
The Dekuli name of the village was derived from its early name Devakuli. Its earlier name Devakuli was named after the King Devasimha. Devakuli is a compound word made from the combination the term Deva and Kuli. The first term Deva signifies to name of the king. Similarly, the second term Kuli signifies to the Kul (family or royal house) of the dynasty.
