= Raj Banauli =

Kingdom in Mithila region

- Banauli Raj
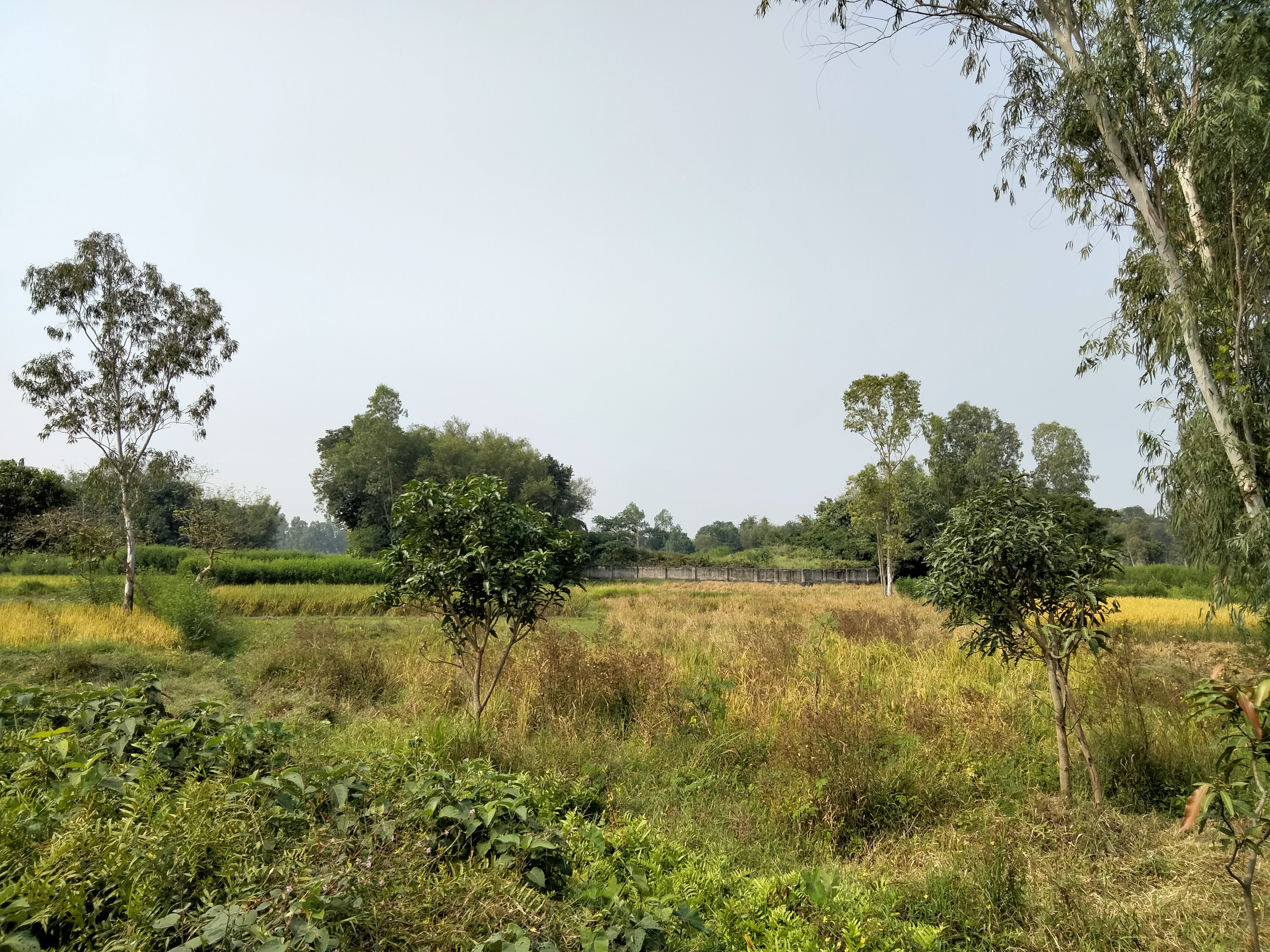
- View of the ruins of the ancient Banauli Fort under the fencing
Names
- Dronwara Puraditya
Regnal name
- Raja Puraditya
- Dynasty: Dronwara
- Religion: Hinduism

Raj Banauli or Banauli Raj was a small kingdom or a principality in the Mithila region of the Indian Subcontinent during the 14th - 15th century CE. It was ruled by the Dronwara dynasty. Puraditya of Dronwara dynasty was the king of the Raj Banauli. He is also known as Dronwara Puraditya and Girinarayan. The king Puraditya defeated another ruler Arjun Singh, so he is also called as Arjun Vijayee. He was contemporary to the emperor King Shivasimha of Mithila and the Maithili poet Vidyapati. The location of the Raj Banauli is disputed among the scholars. Some scholars believe Banauli Vidyapati Dih near south of the Janakpur city as the location of the Raj Banauli. Similarly some scholars believe Banauli of Saptari district as the location of the Raj Banauli. And some scholars claimed Banauli near Sursand as the location of the Raj Banauli.

== Description ==
According to the history of the Mithila region, there were two major dynasties, Oiniwar and Dronwara, ruling the Mithila region in the Indian subcontinent during the 14th-15th century CE. The Oiniwar Dynasty was led by the king Shivasimha, ruling the southern part of the Mithila region. Similarly, the Dronwara Dynasty was led by the king Puraditya, ruling the northern part of the Mithila region. It is said that, after the defeat of King Shivasimha of Oiniwar Dynasty in Mithila by the Mughal emperor, his wife Lakhima Devi and his friend Vidyapati took asylum at the court of the king Dronwara Puraditya in the Raj Banauli of Mithila. Likhanavali of the Maithili poet Vidyapati provides some detailed information about the kingdom of Raj Banauli in Mithila. According to the document Likhanavali, it was prepared during Lakshman Samvat 299 or 1418 AD at the court of King Puraditya of Dronwara Dynasty in the Raj Banauli Kingdom. Vidyapati had dug a pond there in the same year.

According to Maithil scholar Gajendra Thakur, the poet Vidyapati in his own works asserted that he lived at the court of Raj Banauli for 10 to 12 years. There he completed writing of the Maithili version Bhagavata in the year 309 of the Lakshman Samvat.

== Location disputes and claims ==
There are three major locations of Banauli villages in the Mithila region of the present nation of Nepal disputed among scholars. They are Banauli villages of Mahottari district, Saptari district, and Sirha district in Nepal. These three villages have been claimed as the location of the capital of the Raj Banauli by different scholars and local legends. Banauli villages of Mahottari district and Saptari district are dominantly claimed as the location of the Raj Banauli.

=== Banauli Vidyapati Dih (Mahottari) ===
In the Mahottari district, there is a historical site related to Maithili poet Vidyapati located at Banauli village of the Pipara Rural Municipality known as Banauli Vidyapati Dih. This site has been claimed as the location of the Banauli Raj. According to the book "Journal of the Asiatic Society of Bengal, Volume 73, Part 1 published in 1907" the Raj Banauli is 30 miles north from Darbhanga. The present distance of the Banauli Vidyapati Dih of the Mahottari district is approximately 36 miles from Darbhanga in north direction, which is nearly same as mentioned in the book.

=== Banauli (Saptari) ===
According to historian cum professor Basudev Lal Das, Puraditya was the king of Saptari on the eastern side of Kamala river. In the Saptari district, there is a village named Banauli near Khando river, which is claimed to be the location of Raj Banauli.
