= Banauli Vidyapati Dih =

Place related to Vidyapati

- बनौली विद्यापति डीह (Maithili)
- Vidyapati Dih
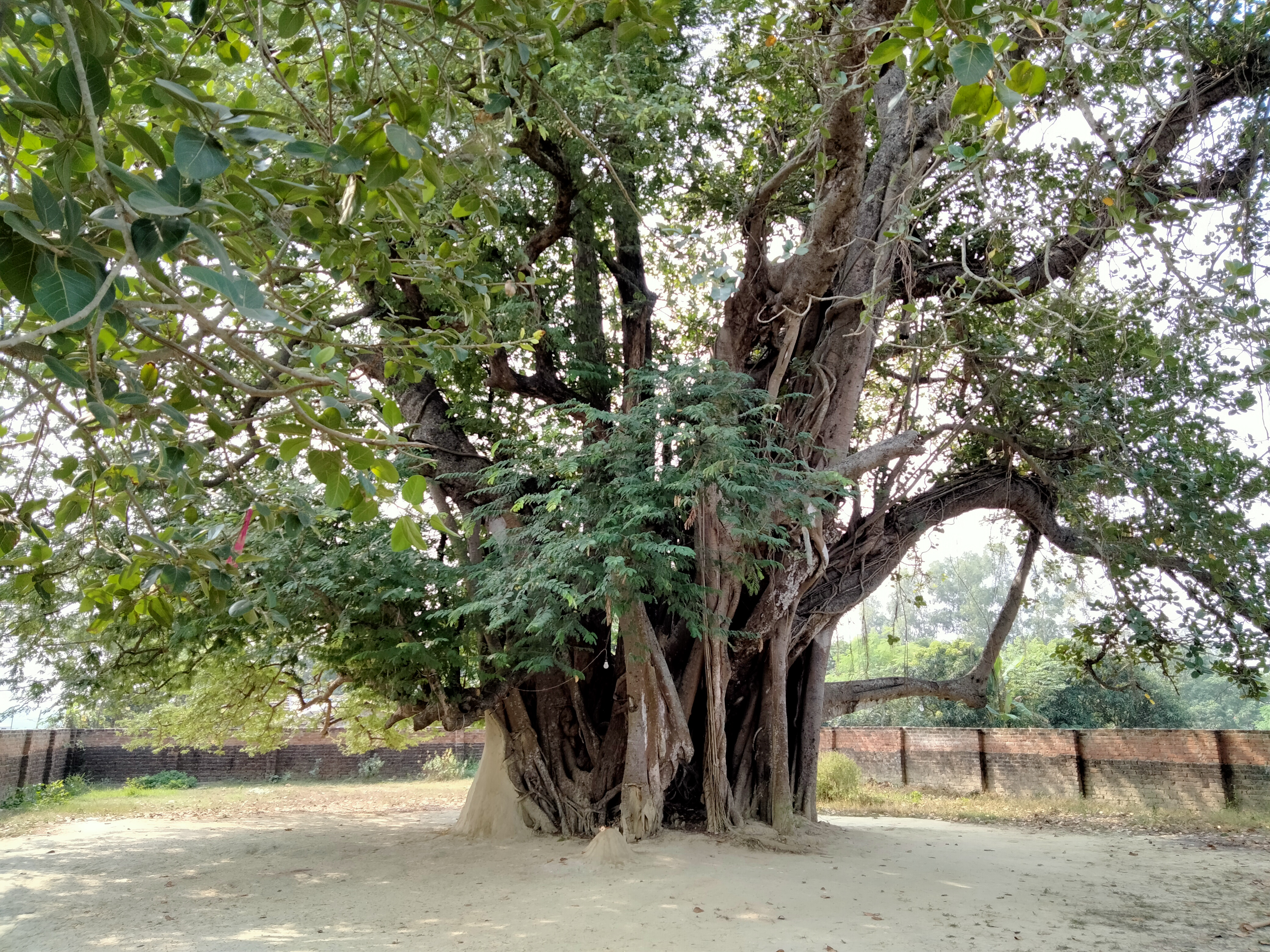
- Brahm Baba Sthan, Banauli Vidyapati Dih
- Interactive map of Banauli Vidyapati Dih
- 26.6780129°N 85.8793243°E
- Cultures: Hinduism
- Location: Banauli Village, Mahottari district, Nepal
- Region: Mithila
- Part of: Ancient Mithila University

Site notes
- Owner: Vidyapati

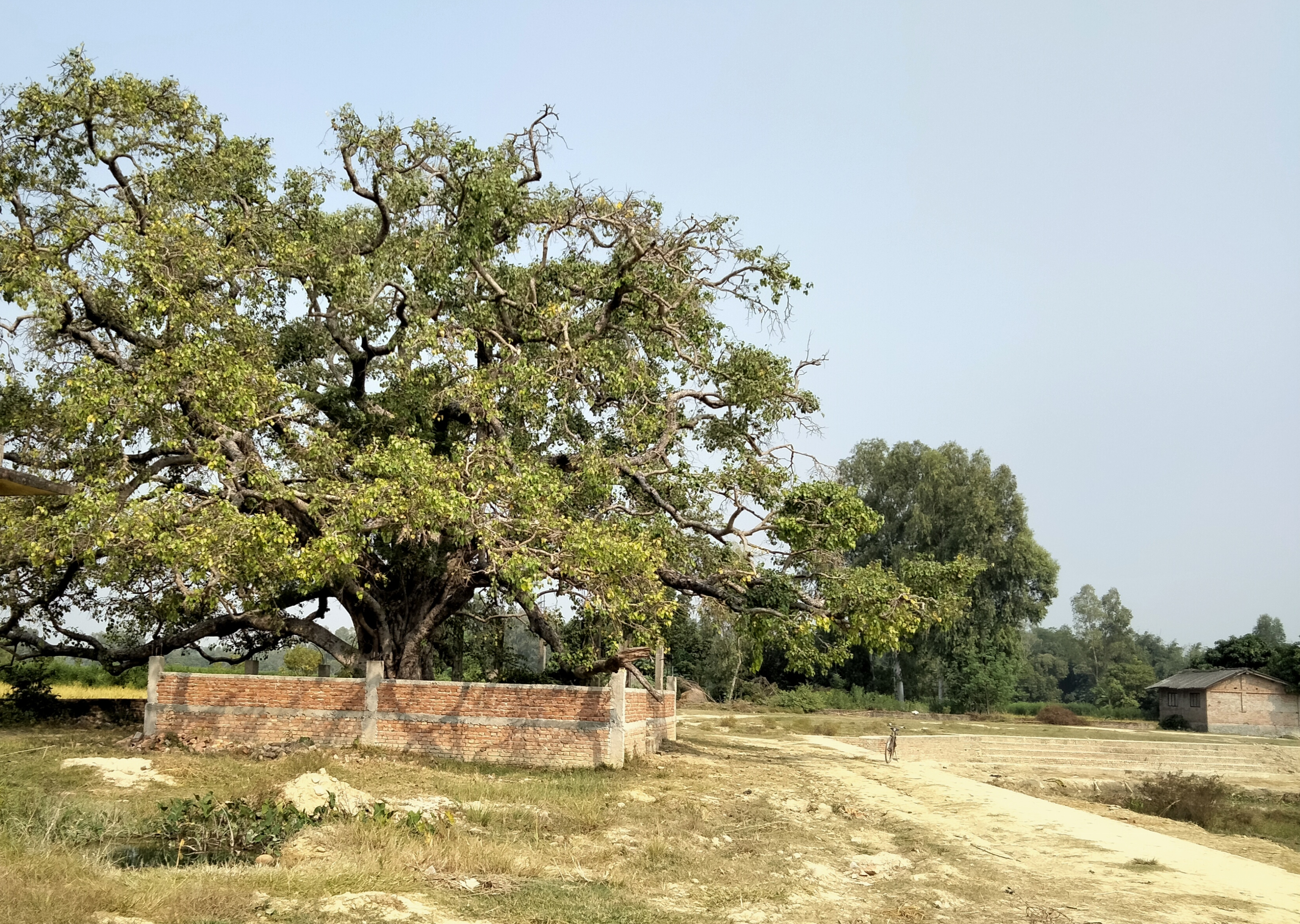
The Pipal tree where Vidyapati wrote and taught his compositions

Banauli Vidyapati Dih (Maithili: बनौली विद्यापति डीह) is a historical place related to the great Maithili poet Vidyapati. It is located at Banauli village of Mahottari district in Madhesh Pradesh of Mithila region in Nepal.

It is 3.8 miles or 6.116 kilometres South-West from the historical, cultural and religious city of Janakpur Dham in Nepal. It is believed that when the Mughal emperor arrested the King Sivasimha of Mithila, then the King said to his friend and priest Vidyapati to flew his wife Lakhima Devi into the neighbouring country Nepal at his friends kingdom Banauli Raj. Dronwara Puraditya was the King of Banauli Raj Kingdom. Vidyapati and the queen Lakhima Devi flew away from the capital Gajarathapur and took asylum at the court of Dronwara Puraditya. It is said that they lived here for twelve years. Vidyapati wrote many books there. The Government of Madhesh Pradesh declared it as a tourist centre.

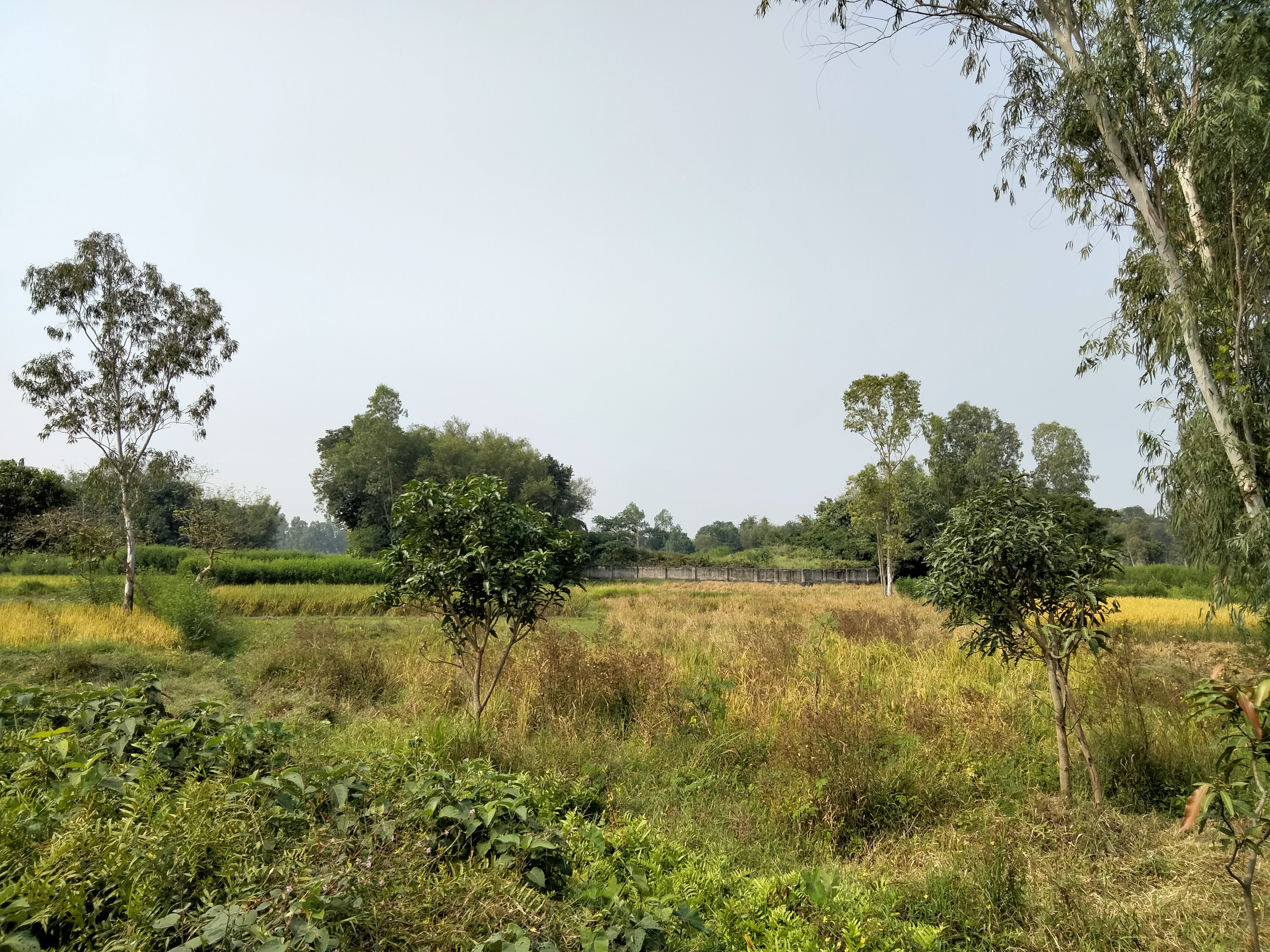
Ancient site of Banauli Vidyapati Dih

== History ==
The presence of the place is recorded in the poem “Trishit” of Kali Kant Jha. There is a library called as Vidyapati Memorial Library near the site in the Banauli village of Nepal. There is a very big pond named as Lakshmi Sagar near the site. The site has been also recorded as the site of the capital of King Puraditya of Dronwara Dynasty Kingdom in the ancient Mithila. Dronwara Puraditya was the friend of another great Emperor King Sivasimha of Oiniwar dynasty in Mithila. According to the poem "Trishit" the Maithili poet Vidyapati wrote his books Bhagavat, Durga Bhakti and Tarangini here. According to a journal article "CREDIT SYSTEM IN MITHILA" at JSTOR, Vidyapati wrote his famous book Likhanavali at the court of King Dronwara Puraditya in Raj Banauli around Lakshman Samvat 299 ( 1418 AD ). Likhanavali is an important work of Vidyapati for the study of administrative, cultural and socio-economic life of early 15th century in Mithila.

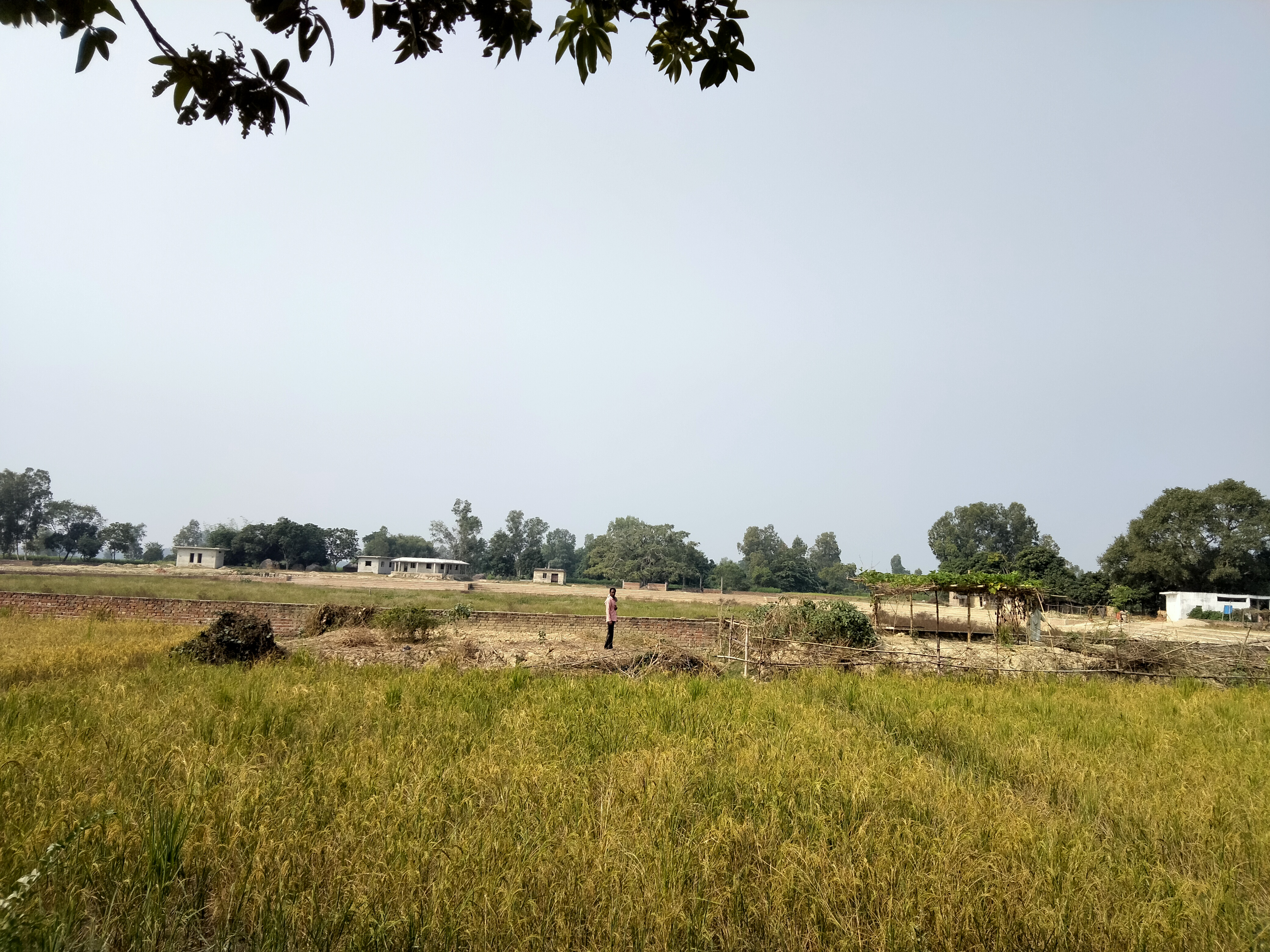
Lakshmi Sagar Pokhair, Banauli Vidyapati Dih

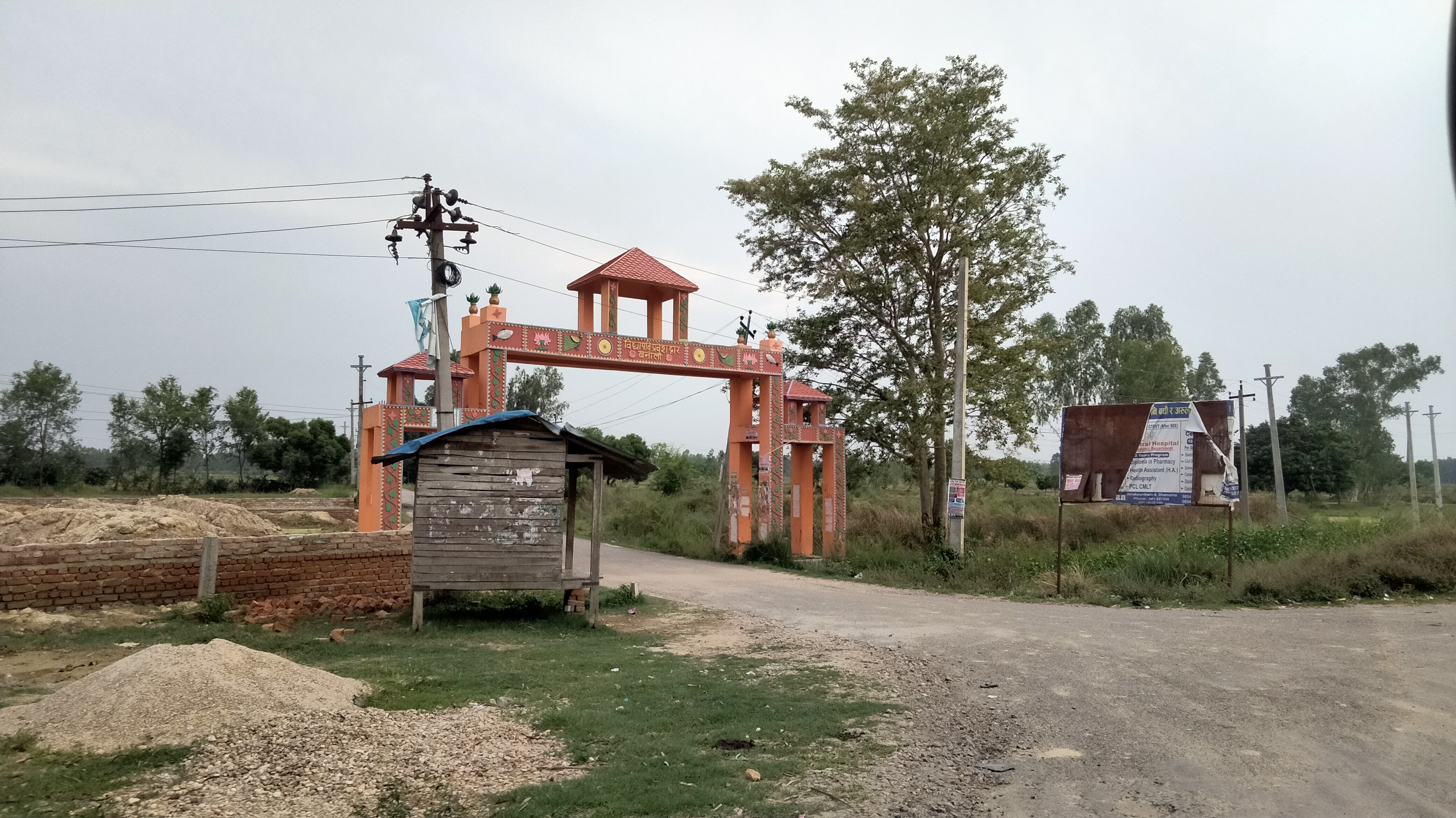
An entrance gate named Vidyapati Pravesh Dwar at the entry point in the village of Banauli on the Bhitthamor - Janakpur National Highway passing through the outskirts of the village
