= Devasimha =

King of Mithila from 1355 to 1410

- King of Mithila
- Reign: 1355 AD - 1410 AD
- Predecessor: Bhavasimha
- Successor: Shivasimha
- Born: Deva; Mithila
- Wife: Hasini Devi
- Kingdom: Mithila Kingdom
- Kingdom: Tirhut Sarkar
- Dynasty: Oiniwar Dynasty
- Father: Bhavasimha
- Religion: Hinduism
- Occupation: King of Mithila

Devasimha (Maithili: देव सिंह) was the sixth king of the Oiniwar Dynasty in the Mithila Kingdom of the Indian subcontinent. He ruled the kingdom during the early period of the 15th century CE. He ascended the throne of the Mithila Kingdom after the King Bhavasimha.

== Early life ==
Devasimha was born in the royal family of the Oiniwar Dynasty in Mithila. He was a Maithil Brahmin and belonged to Kashyap Gotra. He was the eldest son of the King Bhavasimha. His younger brothers were Harasimha and Tripurasimha.

== Rule ==
According some historical accounts, he ascended the throne of Mithila in 1355 AD. He lived before 1410 AD. He established his capital at Dekuli also known Devakuli.
