= Banauli Donauli =

Banauli बनौली
- Village
- Banauli Raj
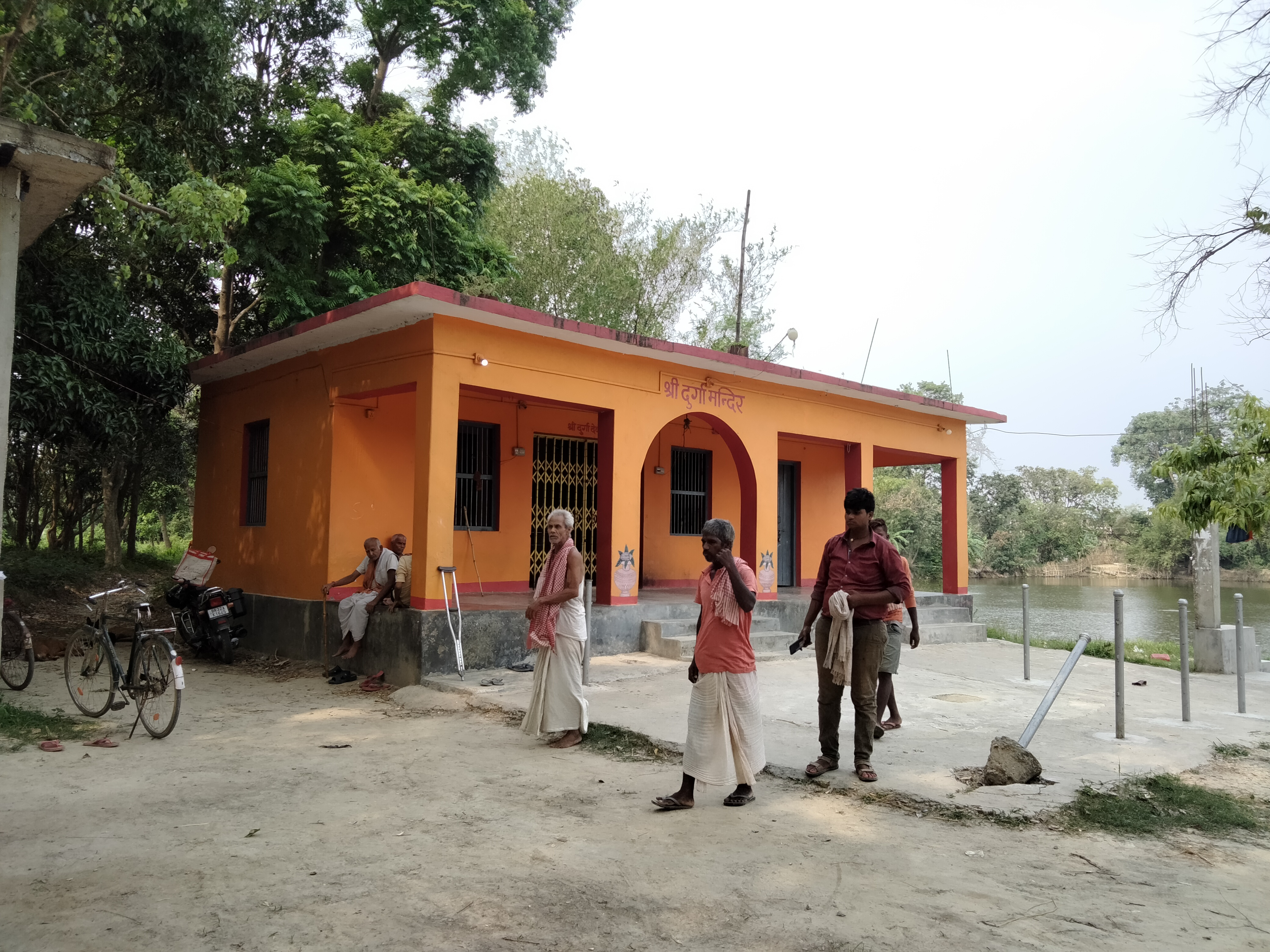
- Durga Puja Mandir at the premises of the Sarkari Pokhair, Banauli

- Location in Nepal
- Coordinates: 26.69°N 85.89°E
- Country: Nepal
- Province: Madhesh Pradesh, Mithila region
- District: Mahottari District
- Founder: Puraditya

Government
  - Type: RJPN
  - Ward Head: MADHUBENDRA JHA

Population (2021)
  - Total: 4,715
- Demonym: Maithil

National Languages
  - Official: Nepali

Regional languages
  - Mother language: Ancient language: Maithili; Sanskrit
- Time zone: UTC+5:45 (Nepal Time)

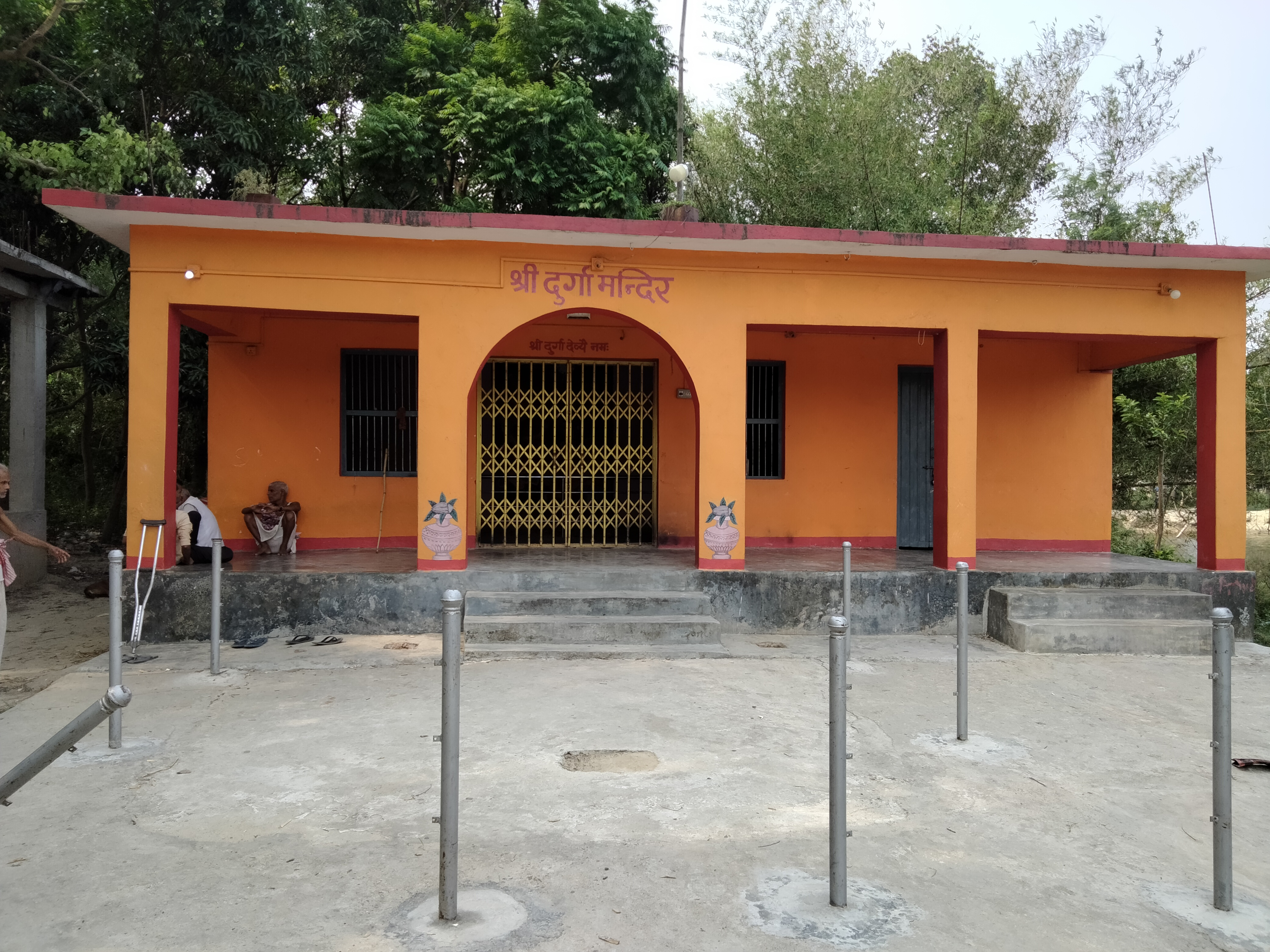
Durga Mandir, Banauli (Rituals are conducted according to the Mithila tradition of Durga Puja.)

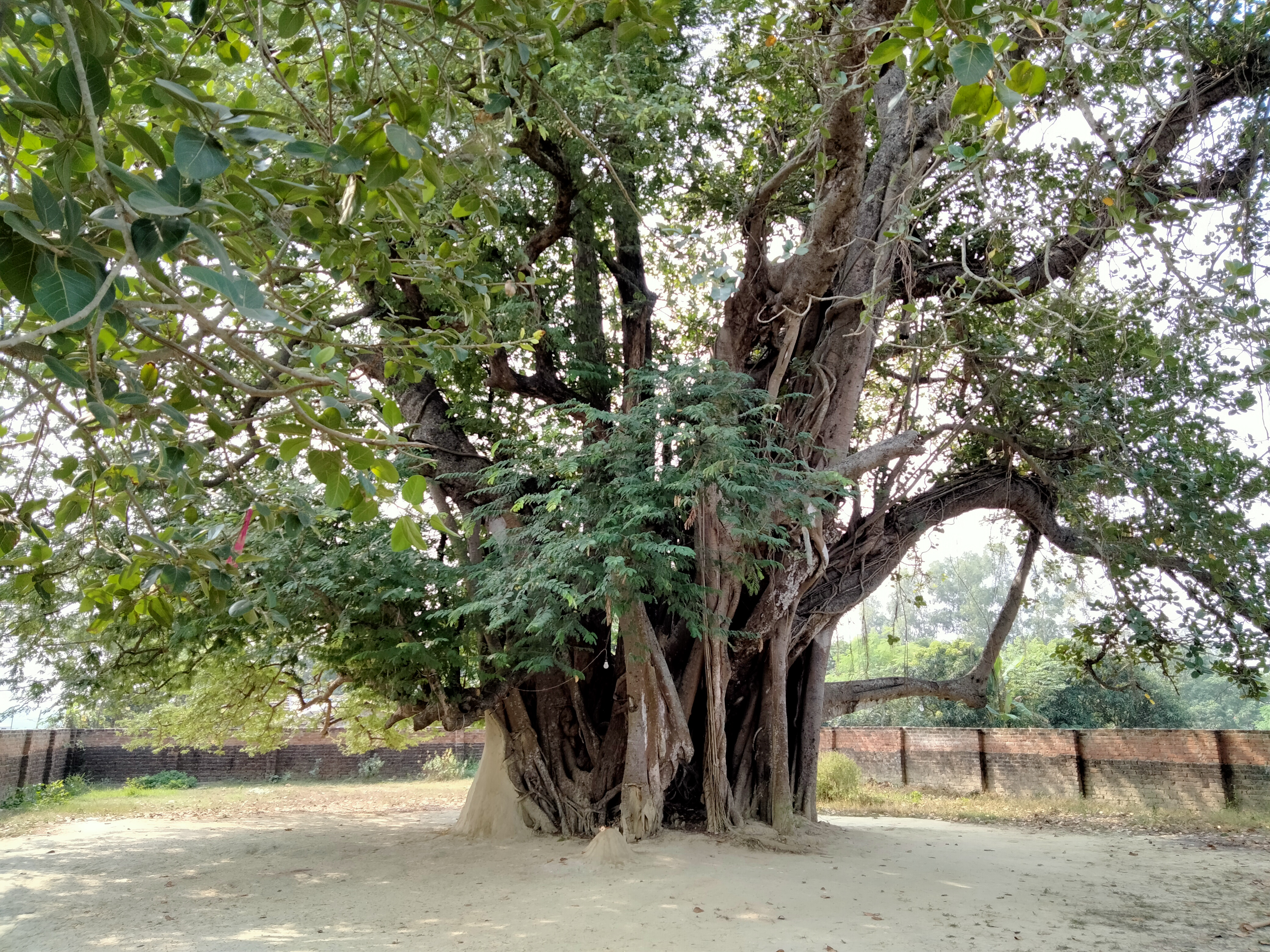
Brahm Baba Sthan, Banauli Vidyapati Dih

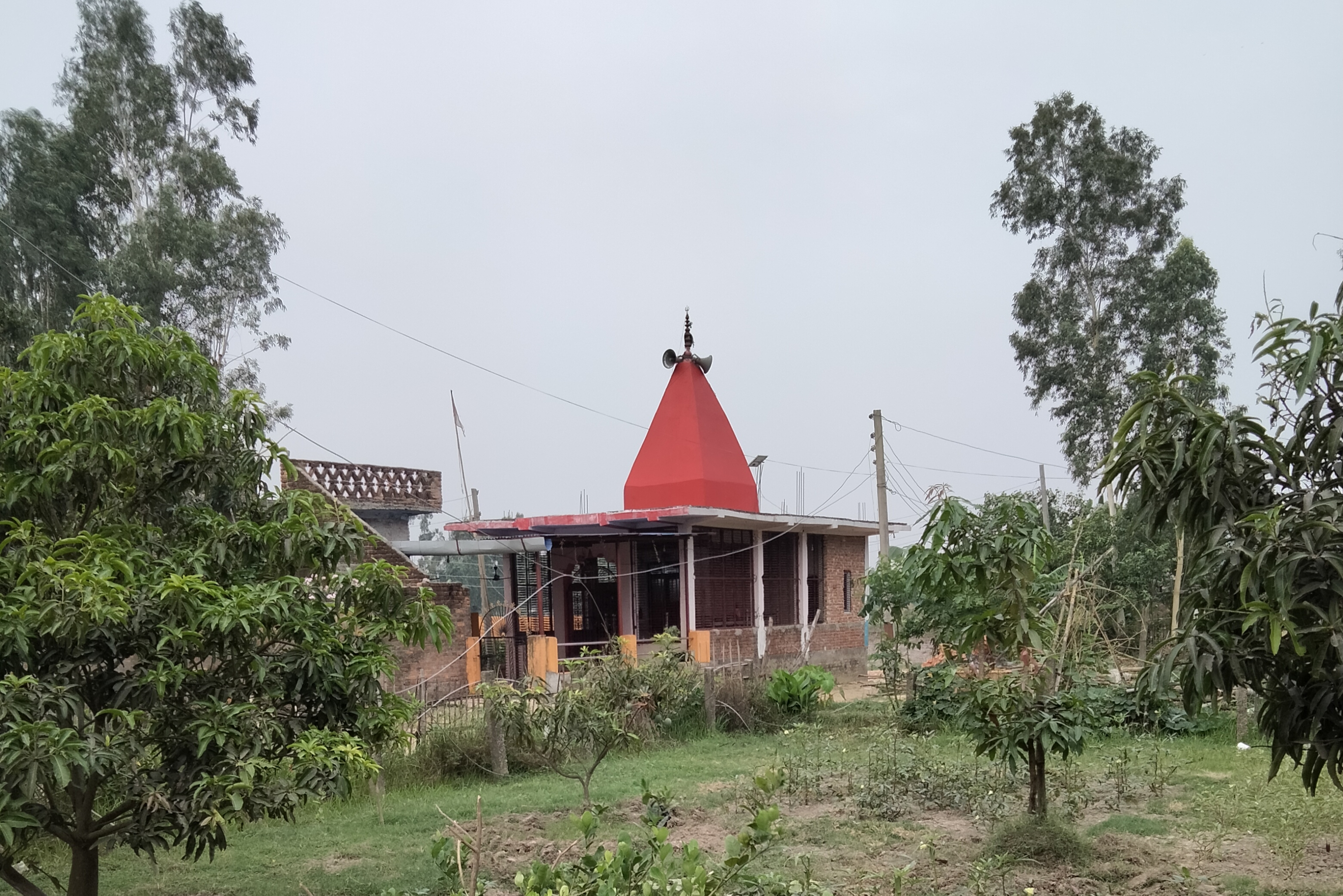
Kali Mandir, Near Kedarilal Pokhair

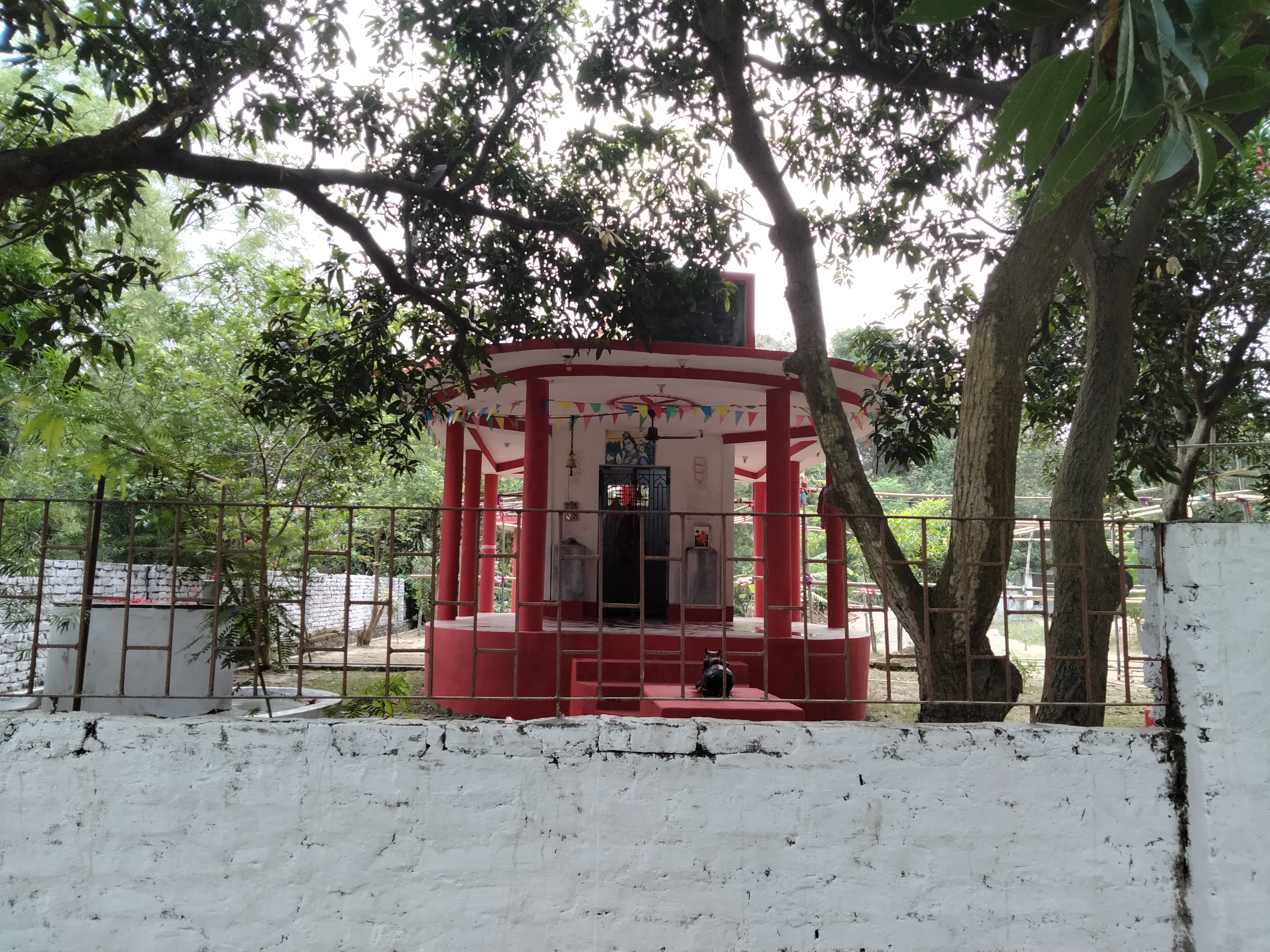
Yogeshwar Nath Mahadev Mandir, Banauli

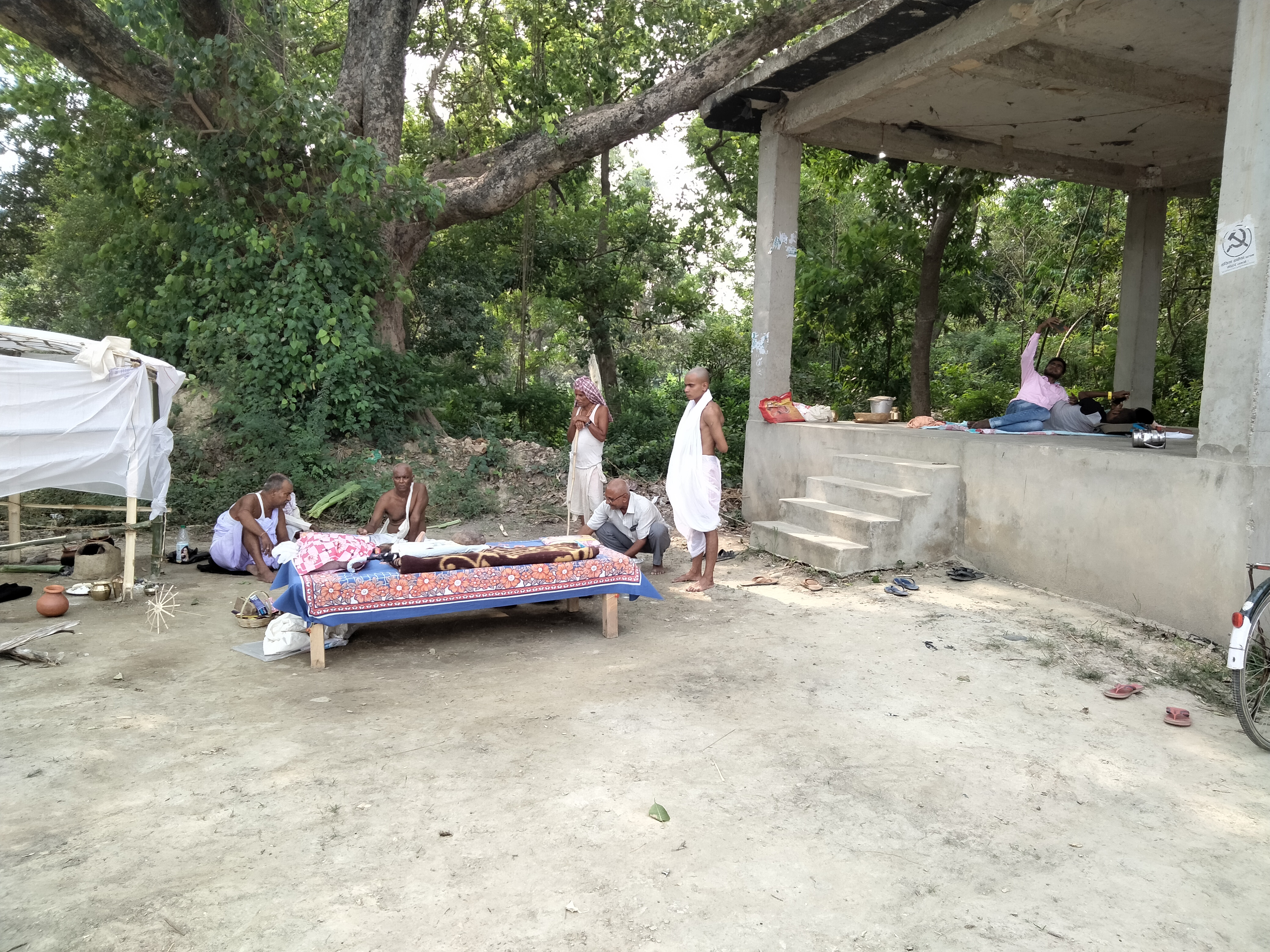
Karma - Kanda rituals of death in Maithili Hindu at Durga Puja Mandir

Banauli is a historical village in the Mithila region of the Indian subcontinent. It is presently representing Ward No. 07 in Pipra Rural Municipality of Mahottari District in the Madhesh Pradesh (Mithila region) province of south-eastern Nepal. According to the Nepal population census 2021, the population of the village is 4715. It is located at South near the city of Janakpur. The village holds the ruins of the fort of the Dronawara King Puraditya in the Raj Banauli of Mithila.

In the village the major inhabitants are Maithil Brahmins (highest in Nepal) Bhumihar, Dhanuk, Shahu, Lohar, Mukhiya, Das etc.

Formerly this Village was under Banauli-Donauli Village Development Committee of Mahottari district however after the provincial distribution of the country, it lies in Pipara Rural Municipality of Mahottari district in Madhesh Pradesh.

== Historical significance ==
Banauli is also considered as the place where great Maithili Poet Vidyapati lived around twelve years and hence it holds great historical significance. The place where Maithili poet Vidyapati lived is known as Banauli Vidyapati Dih. The site is also claimed as the capital of the Raj Banauli of the King Puraditya of the Dronawara Dynasty in Mithila. This village lies 4 km south of Janakpurdham. The village is connected by the Vidyapati National Highway from Janakpur to the Indo - Nepal border town Matihani via Ekrahiya Village. The Vidyapati National Highway is also connected to the Bhitthamore - Janakpur National Highway at Vidyapati Dwar ( Gate ).

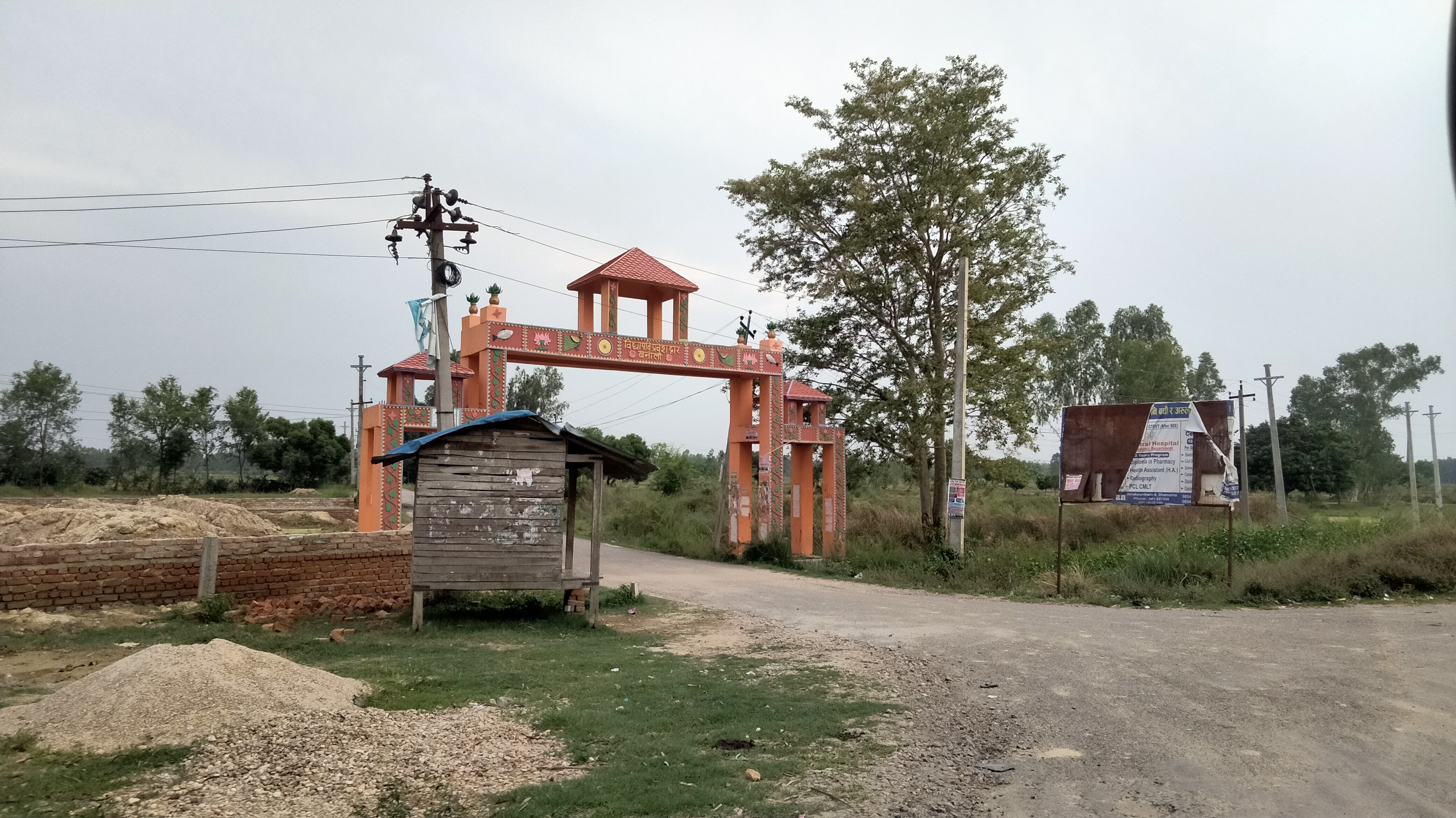
Vidyapati Pravesh Dwar

== Places of interest ==
The village holds a temple dedicated to Goddess Kali in Hinduism. The temple is known as Shree Mahakali Mandir.

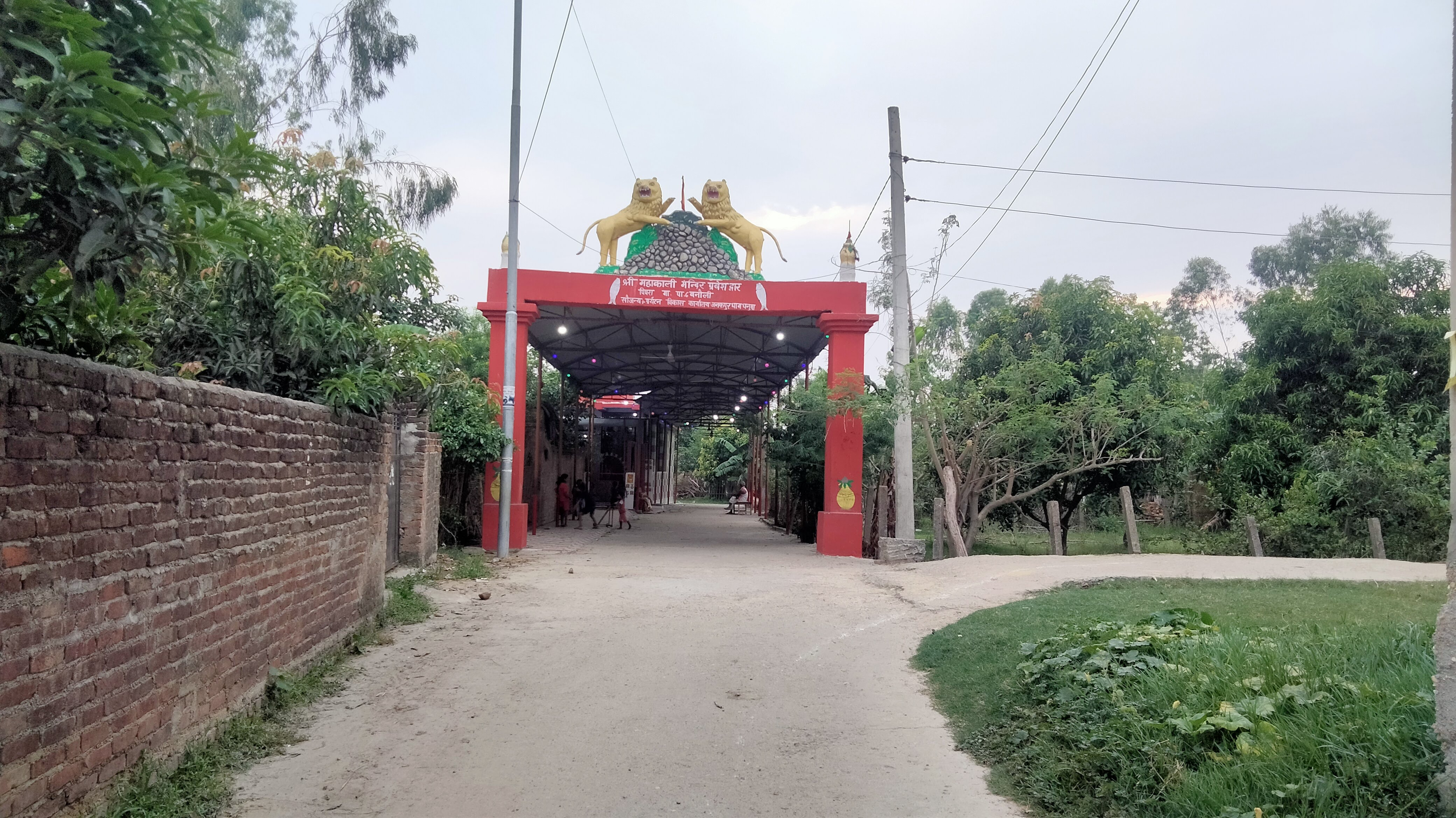
View of the premises of the Kali Mandir in the village.

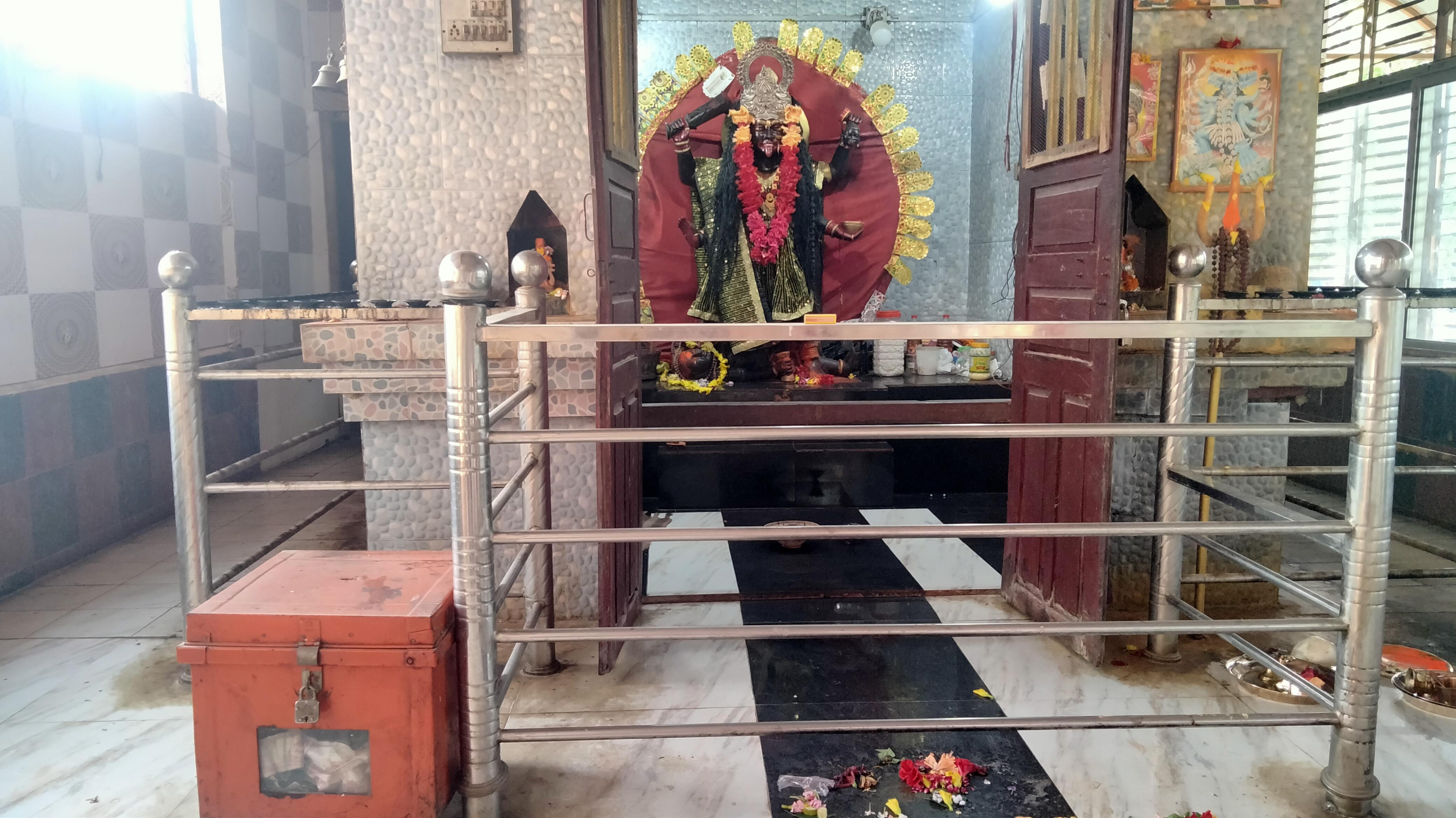
Kali Mata Durbar at the temple.

In the village, there are several ponds. Some major ponds are Laxmi (Lakhima) Sagar at Vidyapati Dih, Sarkari Pokhair at Durga Mandir, and Kedarilal Pokhair at Kali Mandir, etc.

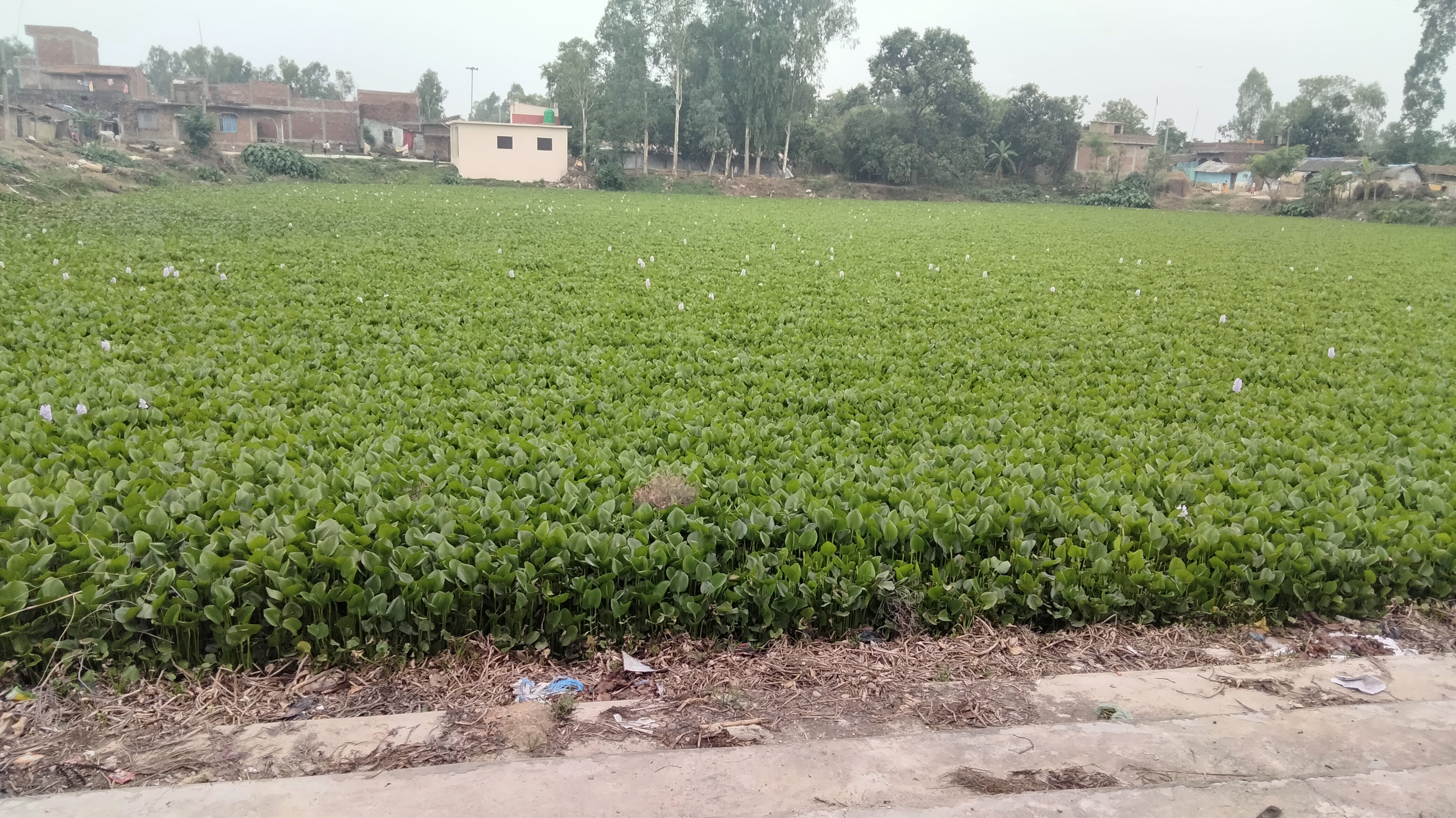
View of Jalkumbhi grown in the Kedarilal Pokhair at Kali Mandir

== See also ==
- Banauli Vidyapati Dih
- Bisfi Vidyapati Dih
- Vidyapati Dham
- Basuki Bihari
- Lakhimadevi
- Raj Banauli
