= Lakhimadevi =

Queen of Mithila in Oiniwar Dynasty

- Maharani of Mithila
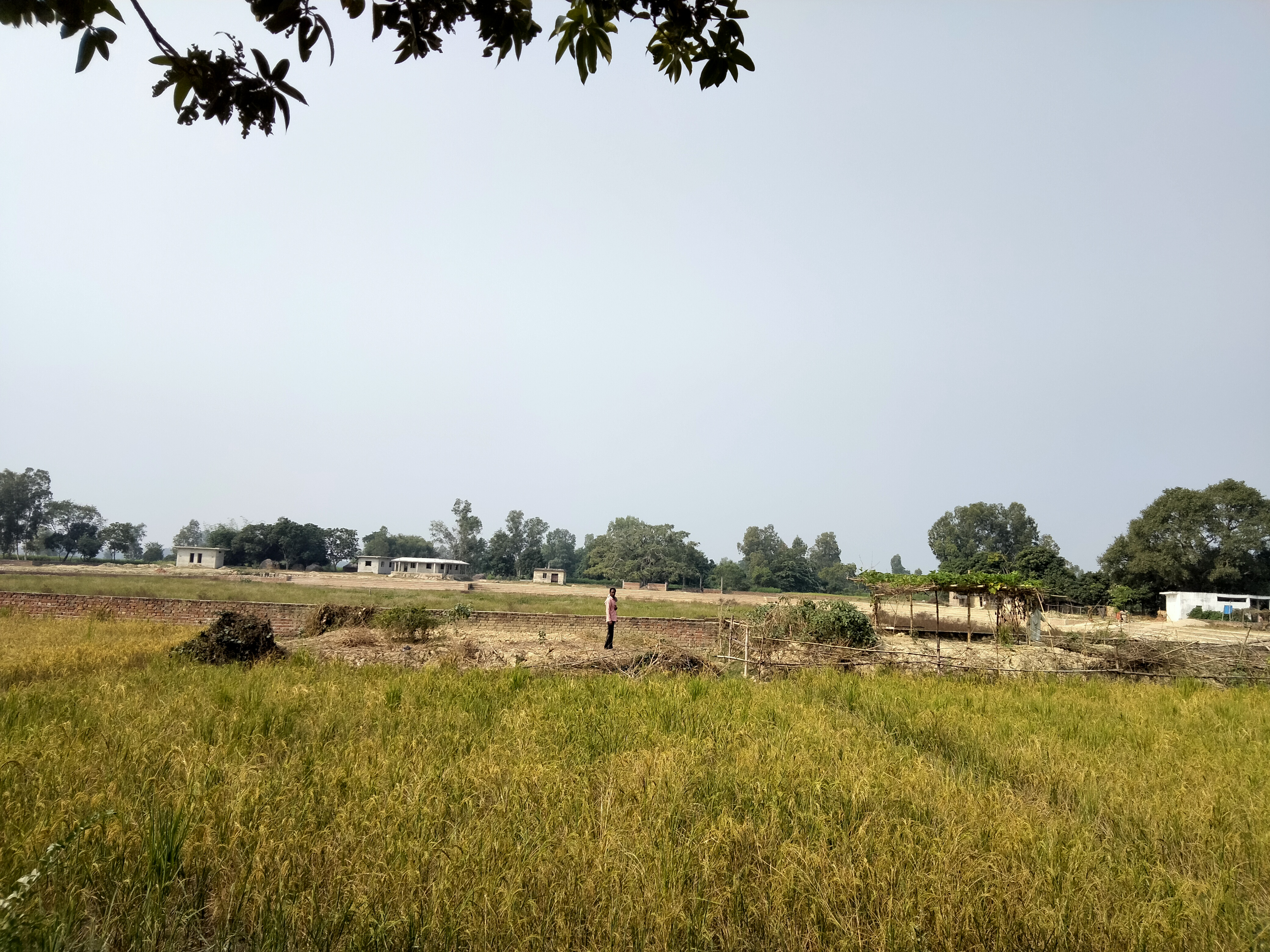
- View of the underconstruction works at the bank of the Lakshmi Sagar Pokhair (also known Lakhimadevi Sagar or some times Vidyapati-Lakhima Sagar near the ruins of the Banauli Vidyapati Dih.
- Reign: 1416 CE - 1428 CE
- Predecessor: Shivasimha
- Successor: Padmasimha (Brother of Shivasimha)
- Born: Lakhima; Mithila
- Died: Banauli Vidyapati Dih, Raj Banauli
- Husband: Shivasimha
Names
- Lakshmi Devi
Regnal name
- Maharani Lakhimadevi
- Kingdom: Tirhut Sarkar
- Kingdom: Mithila Kingdom
- Dynasty: Oiniwar Dynasty
- Religion: Hinduism
- Occupation: Chief Queen - Maharani; Later ruler of Tirhut Sarkar

Lakhimadevi was the queen of the Mithila Kingdom in Oiniwar Dynasty during the period of the King Shivasimha in the kingdom. She was contemporary of the prominent Maithili poet Vidyapati. She was the wife of the King Shivasimha in Mithila. After the missing and death of the King Shivasimha, the queen took control of the Mithila Kingdom. The Mithila Kingdom was also known as Tirhut Kingdom those days. She was the eighth ruler in the Oiniwar Dynasty of the kingdom.

The history of the queen Lakhimadevi is elaborated in the text Purushapariksha composed by the Maithil scholar Vidyapati. She is much praised by the Maithil scholar Vidyapati in his compositions. He has written about the queen Lakhimadevi as a praise in his text quoted

"My poetry flows at the contemplation of the feet of Lakhima Devi"

— Maithili Poet Vidyapati

She is also known as Lakshmi Devi. The poet Vidyapati in his poems had emotionally described the queen as the form of Goddess Lakshmi. In some historical texts, her name is also mentioned as Lakhima Thakurani or Rani Lakhima Thakurain.

== Early life ==
Lakhimadevi was born in a Maithil Brahmin family in the Mithila region of the Indian subcontinent.

== Later life ==
Lakhimadevi was married to the King Shivasimha of the Oiniwar Dynasty in Mithila. After the marriage, she became the chief queen of the Mithila Kingdom. According to historians, she was a scholarly woman and well versed about the knowledge of administrative matters of a kingdom. She was also a poetess. She is considered as one of prominent Vibhutis in the Mithila region. Due to her poetic talent, she is also identified as Mahakavi in the region.

It is said that when the Mughal emperor arrested the King Sivasimha of Mithila, then the King said to his Rajpandita Vidyapati to flew his wife Lakhimadevi into the neighbouring kingdom Raj Banauli of his friend Dronwara Puraditya. Then the poet Vidyapati along with Maharani Lakhimadevi flew away from the capital Gajarathapur and came to the kingdom of Raj Banauli and took asylum at the court of the King Dronwara Puraditya.

== Rule ==
In the asylum at the court of Raj Banauli, Maharani Lakhimadevi took control on the throne of King Shivasimha by the help of the Rajpandita Vidyapati. According to historians, Maharani Lakhimadevi ruled the Mithila Kingdom in the absence of King Shivasimha from the court of Raj Banauli at Banauli Vidyapati Dih for 12 years. The time period of the regime of Maharani Lakhimadevi was from 1416 CE to 1428 CE. The Rajpandita Vidyapati became her political advisor and helped her in the matters of administration of the Tirhut Sarkar.

The Maithil historian Makhan Jha in his book Anthropology of Ancient Hindu Kingdoms, described the queen Lakhimadevi of progressive nature. Maharani Lakhimadevi criticized the Bikaua system marriage of women prevalent in the Maithil society those days. In the Bikaua system, a large number of women of lower grade section were married to a single man of higher grade section in the same caste. The women married to the Bikaua man had to live with their own parents. The word Bikaua was used for the man whom several women were married. This system of marriage was practiced in order to raise own social status of the lower grade family. But this system had a serious problem that after the death of the Bikaua man, a large number of women were becoming widows. Therefore, Maharani Lakhimadevi criticized the Bikaua system and tried to eradicate it from the society.

== Legacy ==
Maharani Lakhimadevi is one the important figures in the legendary as well as historical stories of the mediaeval Mithila Kingdom. She is also an important character in the literature of the Maithili language.

There are several historical places named after her name in the Mithila region of the Indian subcontinent. In the Himalayan nation Nepal, there is a historical pond called as Lakshmi Sagar near the Vidyapati Dih in the Banauli Danauli village of the Mahottari district in the Mithila region. The historical pond was named after the name of the Maharani Lakhimadevi of the Mithila Kingdom.

Peepul tree on the bank of the Lakhimadevi Sagar at the present Banauli village.

== See also ==
- Vishwasa Devi
