= Bhavasimha =

King of Mithila

- King of Mithila
- Reign: 1353 CE - 1386 CE
- Coronation: 1353 CE
- Predecessor: Kirtisimha
- Successor: Devasimha
- Born: Bhavesa; Mithila
- Royal house: Mithila Kingdom
- Royal house: Tirhut Sarkar
- Dynasty: Oiniwar Dynasty
- Father: Kameshwar Thakur
- Religion: Hinduism
- Occupation: Ruler of Mithila Kingdom

Bhavasimha (Maithili: भव सिंह) was a king of the Mithila Kingdom during the period of Oiniwar Dynasty in the Indian subcontinent. He was a great warrior. He ruled the kingdom for thirty six years, from 1353 CE to 1386 CE. He was the grandfather of King Shivasimha. He was the fifth king in the Oiniwar Dynasty of the Mithila Kingdom.

== Early life ==
Bhavasimha was born in the royal family of the Oiniwar Dynasty in Mithila. He was a Maithil Brahmin. He belonged to the Kashyapa Gotra. He was a younger son of King Kameshwar Thakur in the Oiniwar Dynasty. His childhood name was Bhavesa. He is also called Bhavesvara Thakkura. He was the younger brother of Bhogisvara Thakkura.

== Later life ==
Later in life, Bhavasimha became the father of three children. His eldest son was Devasimha. His other sons were Tripurasimha and Udayasimha.

== Rule ==
Bhavasimha succeeded King Kirtisimha as ruler of the Oiniwar Dynasty in the Mithila Kingdom. He ascended the throne of the kingdom in 1356 CE. He ruled the kingdom for 36 years. The Maithil scholar Vidyapati, in his literary works, described and praised King Bhavasimha as a brave warrior king.
