= Puraditya =

Raja Banauli

- Raja
Names
- Puraditya Dronwar
Era name and dates
- Mediaeval period: 14th-15th century
Regnal name
- Raja Banauli Puraditya; Dronawara Mahipati
- पुरादित्य: Maithili
- House: Raj Banauli
- Dynasty: Dronawara Dynasty
- Religion: Hinduism
- Also known as Arjun Vijayee

Puraditya (Maithili: पुरादित्य) was a king of the Raj Banauli in the Mithila region during 15th century in the Indian subcontinent. He belonged to the Dronawara Dynasty in the region of Mithila. He is also called as Girinarayan, Raja Banauli and Arjun Vijayee. His capital was located at Banauli village. He was contemporary to the emperor king Shivasimha in Mithila. He carved out an independent kingdom for himself from the region of Mithila in the subcontinent. After the attack of Muslim rulers on the Kingdom of Oiniwar Dynasty, the queen Lakhimadevi, the wife of King Shivasimha, took shelter at the court of the King Puraditya in the Raj Banauli Kingdom in the region. The contemporary King Shivasimha was the friend of the Dronwara King Puraditya.

Maithil scholar Vidyapati was one of the most important scholar at the court of the King Puraditya in Mithila during the Dronwar Dynasty. In the patronage of the King Puraditya, the Maithil poet Vidyapati composed the Sanskrit text Likhanavali, which is a source of study of the socio-economic history of the Mithila region during the mediaeval period. In the text Likhanavali, the King Puraditya is honoured Dronawara Mahipati.

== Victory over King Arjuna ==
According to historical records, the Maithil poet Vidyapati along with the Oiniwar Dynasty queen Lakhimadevi took asylum at the court of the King Puraditya. During their asylum, Vidyapati got dug a pond in the capital of the King Puraditya to organise a Yajna. After the completion of the digging works of the pond, Vidyapati called learned Panditas to celebrate the Yajna. It is said that the Buddhists of Arjuna's Kingdom created disturbance in the Yajna. The King Arjuna also instigated the Buddhists to do so. This led to a war between the King Puraditya and the King Arjuna.

In the war, the King Arjuna was defeated and killed by the King Puraditya. After the victory over Arjuna, the King Puraditya was praised as Arjuna Vijayee, which translates to "victory over Arjuna". In the historical records, there are some controversies on identification of the King Arjuna. According to some scholars, the King Arjuna was a descendant of the Oiniwar Dynasty, whereas some other scholars claimed him to be a Buddhist. He was the King of the Saptari Pargana in the Mithila region of the subcontinent. After the death of the King Arjuna, the Saptari Pargana was annexed by the King Puraditya of the Raj Banauli in Mithila. With the annexation, he became the ruler of the Saptari Pargana. He is also called as the King of the Saptari Pargana in Mithila.

== Lineage ==
Puraditya belonged to the historical Dronawara Dynasty in the subcontinent. His ancestral lineage is linked to the Dronawara Dynasty that historically emerged from the present region of the Uttar Pradesh state in India. There are some disputes on the origin of the Dronawara Dynasty. According some scholars, the Dronawara Dynasty in Mithila, were originated in the Mithila region itself. They were Dronawara Brahmins. But in some other sources, they are claimed to be Bhumihar Brahmins.
