= Shiva Simha Singh =

King of Mithila

- Maharaja of Mithila

Maharaja of Mithila
- Reign: 1412–1416
- Predecessor: Devasimha
- Successor: Lakhima Devi
- Born: Sivasimha
- Consort: Lakhima Devi
- Wives: Padmavati; Lakhima Devi; Viśvasadevi
- House: Oiniwar Dynasty
- House: Tirhut Sarkar
- Father: Devasimha
- Mother: Hasini Devi
- Religion: Hinduism

Shiva Simha Singh, also known as Sivasimha, was a king of the Oiniwar dynasty in Mithila. He was also referred to as Rūpanārāyana. He declared himself independent and stopped paying taxes to Ibrahim Shah of Jaunpur Sultanate, who invaded Mithila but was defeated.

Mithila, Bengal and Arakanese accounts say that King Sivasimha helped another Brahmin ruler and his friend, Raja Ganesha of Bengal, defeating the Jaunpur Sultanate in Bengal-Jaunpur conflict. Ganesha had previously freed Bengal from Muslim occupation.

== Early life ==
Sivasimha was born in a Mithila Brahmin family of King Devasimha and Hasini Devi. His grandfather was Bhavasimha, the king of the Oiniwar Dynasty before Devasimha. Sivasimha was married to six wives, of whom Lakhimadevi was the most notable and scholarly wife. She ruled Mithila in his absence from Banauliraj for 12 years from 1416 to 1428. She sacrificed herself into fire in a Sati ritual after 12 years waiting for Sivasimha. Padmavati was the eldest wife of the Sivasimha, who also ruled Mithila for three years.

== Rule ==
Sivasimha ruled Mithila between 1412 and 1416. He took active part in the kingdom's administration since he was 15, when his father, King Devasimha, was alive. He transferred his capital from Devakuli to Gajarathapur (also known as Shiv Singhpur) near Darbhanga .

== Legacy ==
The people of Mithila remember him for digging several large tanks in several villages of the kingdom. Among these tanks, the tanks in villages Rajokhari, and Barh are associated with various proverbs. He issued gold coins, two specimens of which were found at Pipra village of Champaran district in 1913. On those coins were the inscriptions "Shri" on the obverse and "Shiva" on the reverse, which indicates that the coins were minted during the reign of Sivasimha. He was called as Panchagaudeshwara by the poet Vidyapati. He granted Bisfi village in the present Madhubani district to his friend Vidyapati for his poems Kirtilata and Kirtipataka. He is also said to have erected a Mausoleum known as Mamoon Bhanja at Jaruha, near Hajipur.

== Wars ==
In his copper plate grant to Vidyapati, he claimed to have won the kings of Gauda and Gajjanpur. He was also involved in the Bengal–Jaunpur confrontation.

He led an expedition against Gauda to extend his rule over that land. Sivasimha thought of conquering this newly converted Muslim ruler. He defeated Jalaluddin Muhammad Shah, the Sultan of Bengal, and annexed major portions of the sultanate while making his region free.
