= Chaurchan =

Festival in the Mithila region of the Indian subcontinent

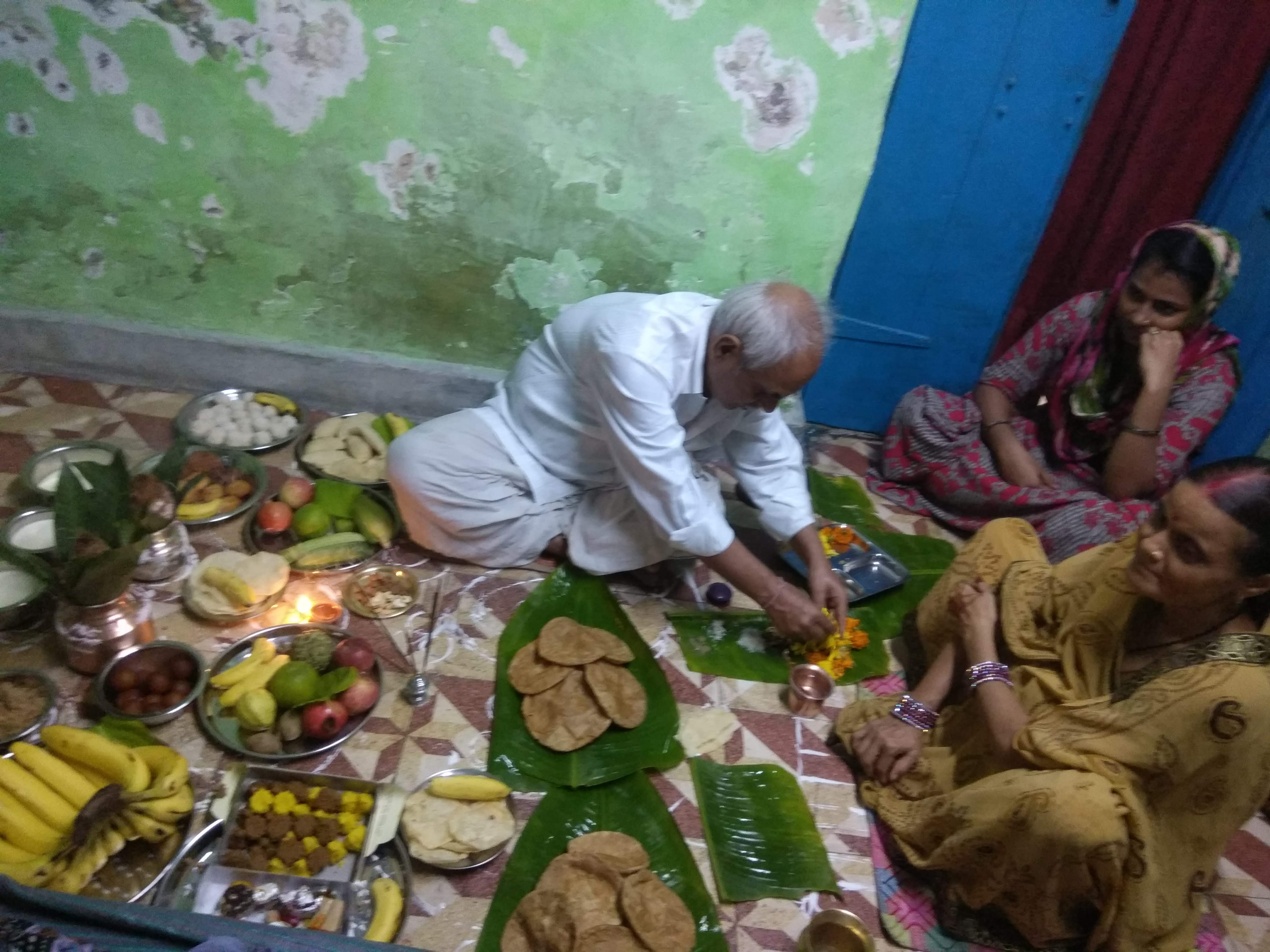
- Chaurchan Puja celebration by Maithil people in Mumbai
- Nickname: Chauthi Chaan
- Genre: Festival dedicated to Lord Chandradeva in Mithila
- Dates: Chaturthi, Rohini Nakshatra, Shukla Paksha, Bhadrapada
- Frequency: Annually
- Venue: Courtyard of Maithil family
- Countries: India and Nepal
- Most recent: 14 September 2026
- Previous event: 26 August 2025
- Patrons: Maharani Hemlata and King Hemangada Thakura of Mithila (16th century CE)

Chaurchan (pronounced [tɕaːu̯rtɕən]) is a festival for married women in the Mithila region of the Indian subcontinent. It is also known as Chorchanna/Chakchanna Paavain, Chauth Chand or Chauth Chandra or Chorchan Puja. It is dedicated to Ganesha and the moon god Chandra Deva. During the festival, married women fast, and different types of dishes are prepared as prasad. The Ganesh Chaturthi fast is also observed on this day. Along with Ganesha, Vishnu, Parvati, and the moon god are worshipped. The story of Chorchan Puja is also heard on this day after that Arghya is offered to Chandra Deva.

In the Maithil community, it is believed that worshipping Lord Chandradeva, the moon god, at the evening on this day brings relief from infamy and false accusations. The Maithil women observe a day-long fast and offer curd and fruits, praying for deliverance from Chandra Dosh (lunar affliction) and protection against social stigma. On this legendary day, Chandradeva was released from the curse of false stigma by Lord Ganesha mentioned in the Puranas.

== Etymology ==
The Maithili word Chaurchan is considered to be an abbreviation or apabhramsha of the phrase 'Chauth Chandra', which means the moon of Chaturthi. The term Chauth signifies to the Chaturthi tithi and the term Chandra to the Lord of the moon. Thus Chaurchan literally means worship of Lord Chandradeva on the Chaturthi tithi.

== Description of Chaurchan Puja ==
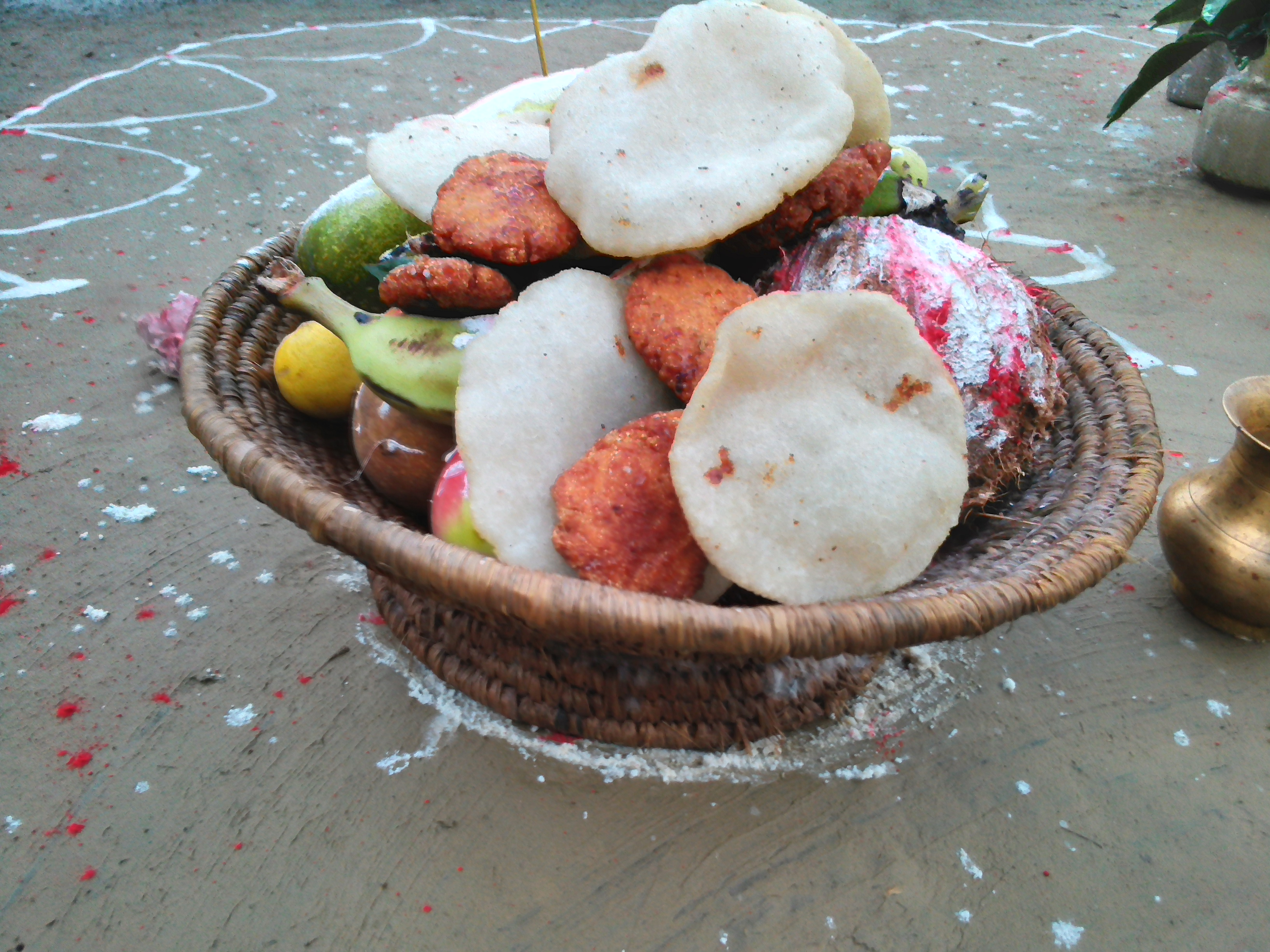
Prasad of Chaurchan Puja

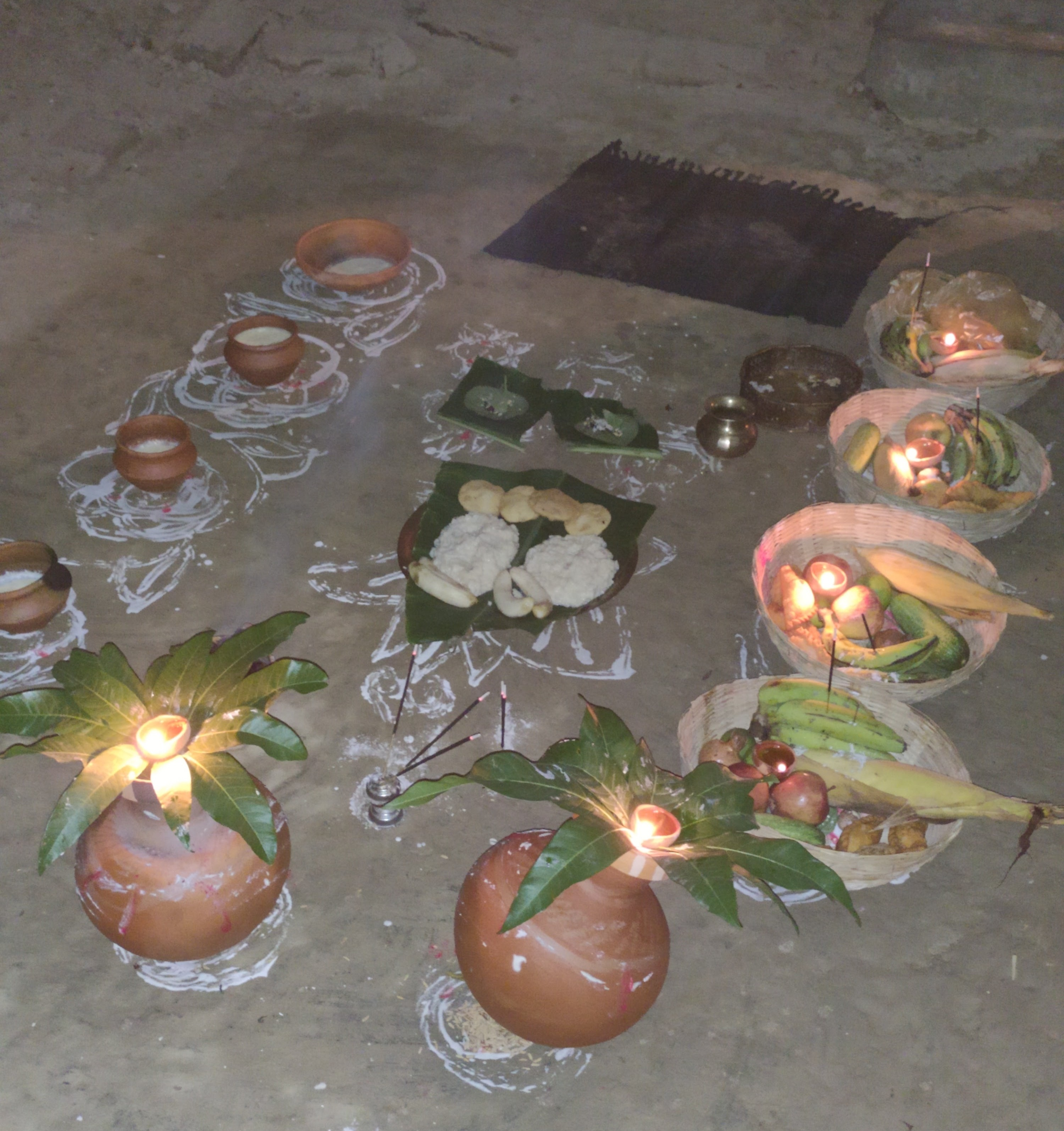
Worship seat of the Chaurchan Puja decorated by Aripan painting

During the Chaurchan Puja, the fasting is observed for the whole day. Married women in Mithila clean the courtyard of their houses by smearing it with cow dung. Religious pictures known as aripan are drawn where the puja will be performed with Pithar made of raw rice and some vermilion placed on them. Various types of dishes, kheer, sweets, fruits, and curd are served on large banana leaves in the courtyard. In the evening, fasting women turn towards the west and offer Arghya to the moon by keeping the bowl of sweets, dishes, curd, banana, fruits etc, in their hand while chanting mantras.

View of the ritual "Offerings Arghya to the moon god Chandradeva" by married Maithil women.

The following mantras are chanted while offering Arghya:

सिंह: प्रसेनमवधिस्सिंहो जाम्बवता हतः। सुकुमार मन्दिस्तव ह्येष स्यामन्तक: स्त।।

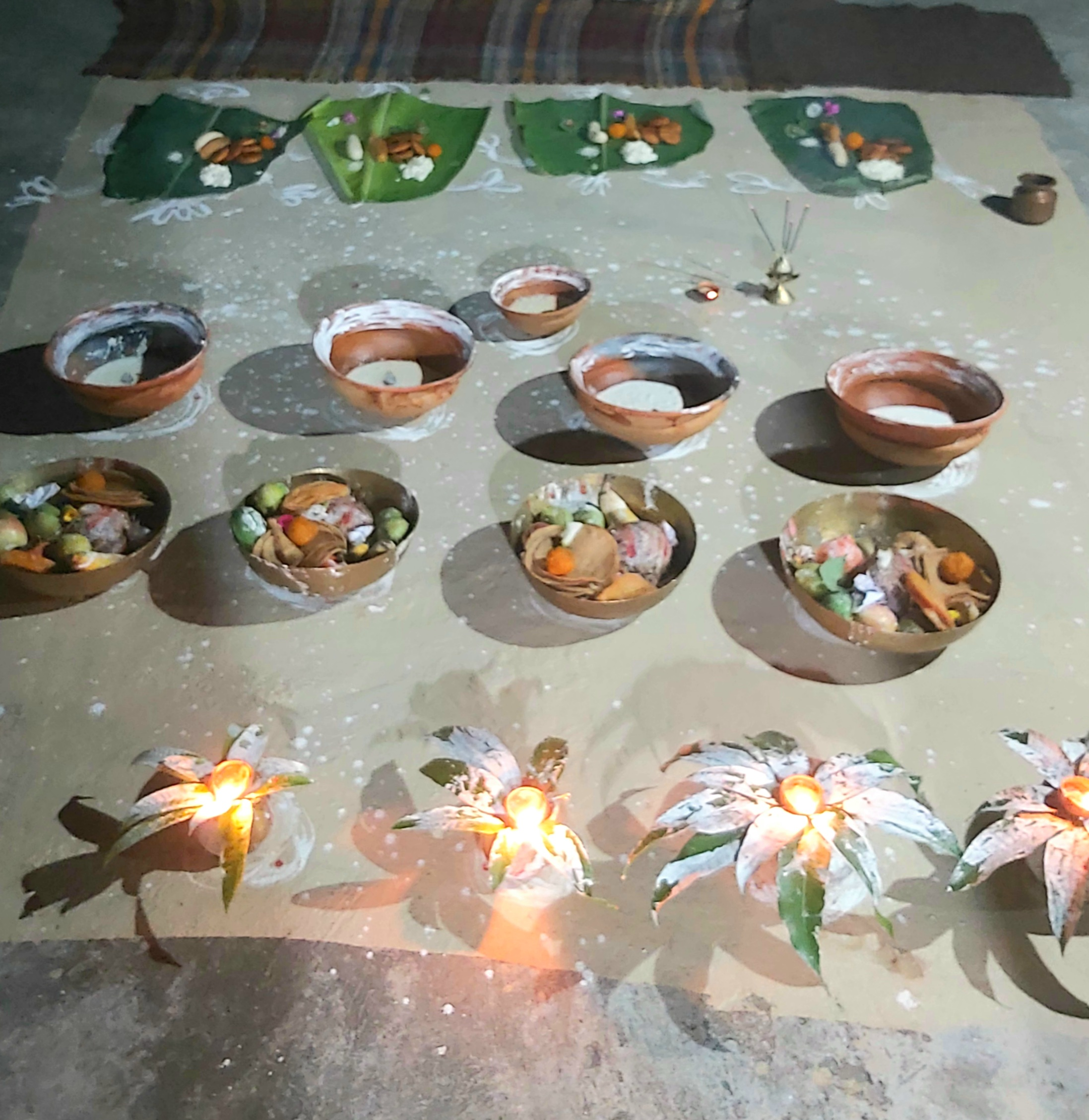
Items of offerings to Lord Chandradeva.

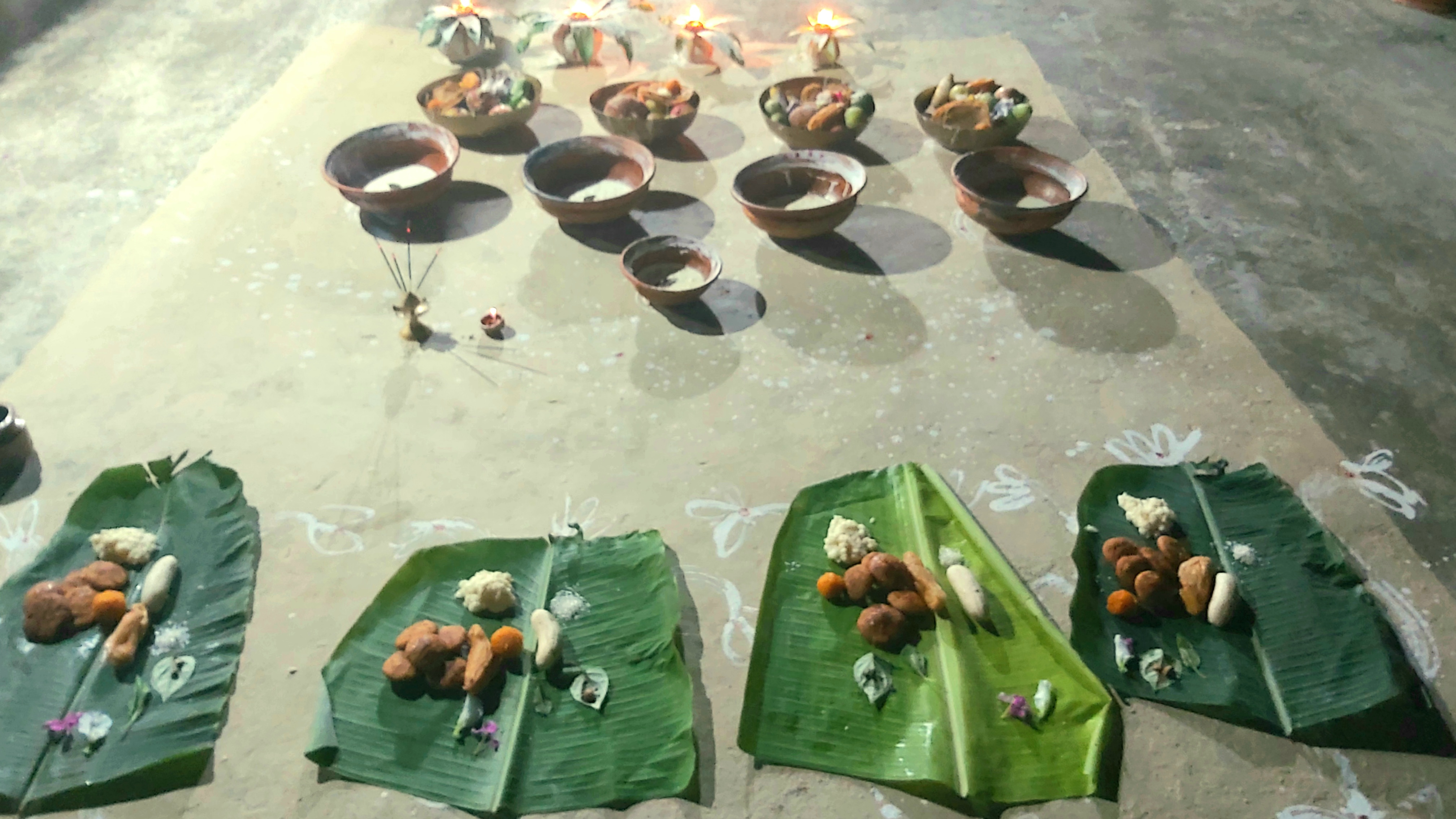
Prasada kept on Banana leaves.

== Date and timing ==
The date of the Chaurchan festival is determined on the basis of the rising of the moon. The rituals of the Chaurchan Puja is performed on the Chaturthi tithi in the Rohini Nakshatra of the Shukla Paksha Bhadrapada.

== Story of the Chaurchan Puja ==
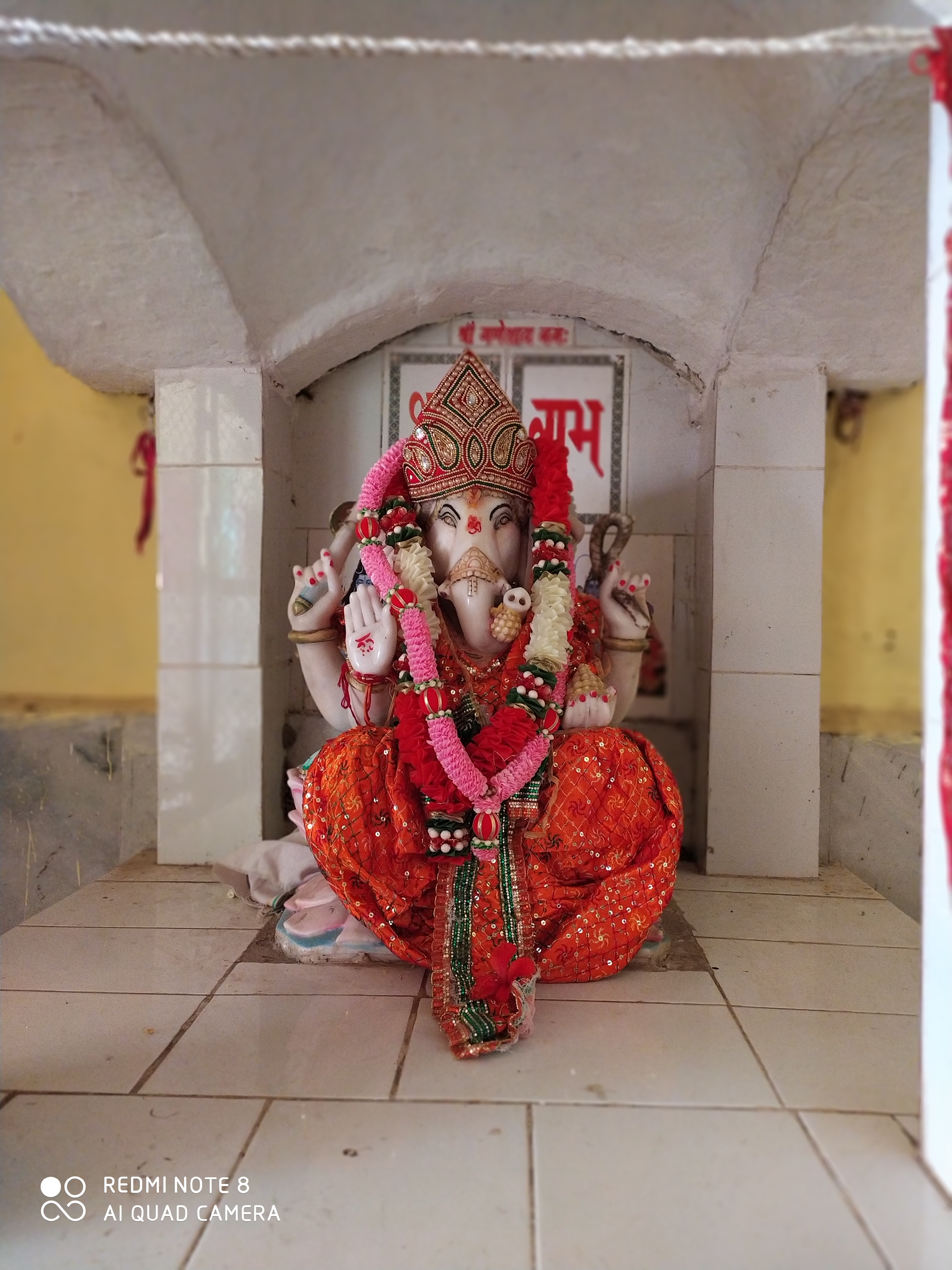
Statue of Ganesha

One day, Ganesha was roaming on Kailash with his vehicle mouse. Chandra Deva laughed seeing him. Ganesha did not understand the reason for his laughter and asked Chandra Deva "Why are you laughing?". Chandra Deva said he was laughing seeing the strange form of Ganesha. At the same time, he also revealed his form. Ganesha became angry at Chandra Deva for making fun of him, and cursed Chandra Deva, saying "you are very proud of your appearance that you look very beautiful but from today you would become ugly. Anyone who sees you will get a false stigma. He will be called a criminal even though he has not committed any offence". On hearing the curse, Chandra Deva's pride was shattered. He apologized to Ganesha and said, "Lord, free me from this curse". Seeing Chandra Deva repenting, Ganesha forgave him. The curse could not be withdrawn completely so it was said that anyone who would see the moon god on the day of Ganesh Chaturthi will be falsely accused. To avoid this, moon is worshiped in Mithila on the evening of Ganesh Chaturthi.

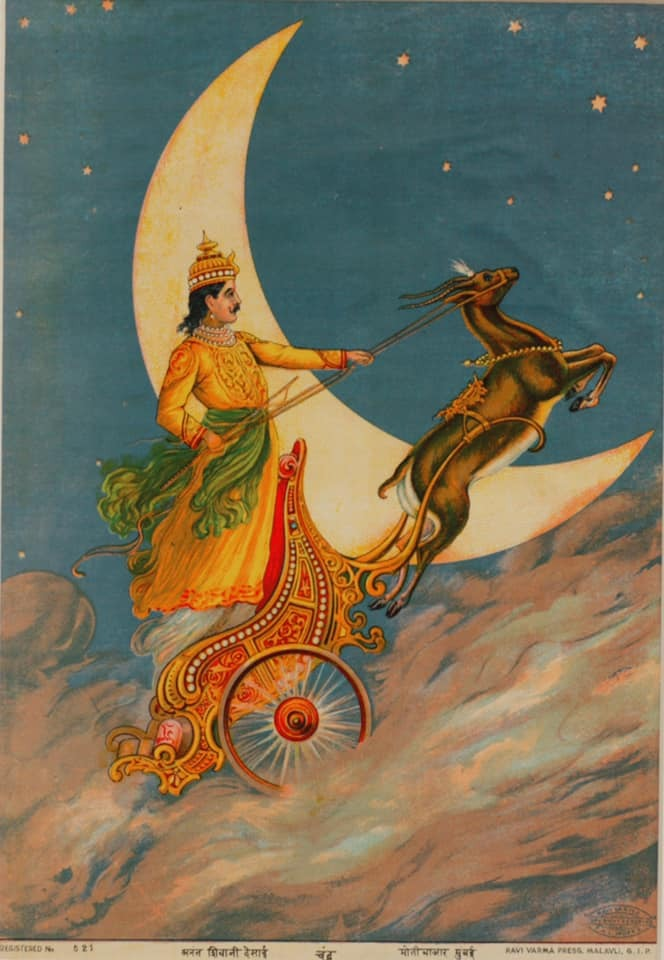
Illustration of Chandra Deva

Chauth Chand is also mentioned in Brahma Purana. There is a story related to Lord Krishna. According to the story, Krishna was accused of stealing the Syamantaka gem, which was stolen by Prasena. A lion killed Prasena, then Jambavan killed that lion and acquired the gem. After this, Krishna defeated Jambavan in a war, got the gem, and became free from the stigma.

== History ==
According to historians, the festival of Chaurchan Puja became popular in Mithila during 16th century CE. There is a history related to it in regime of the King Hemangad Thakur of Mithila Kingdom (Tirhut Sarkar). Once King Hemangad Thakur was arrested by Mughal for not paying tax to the Mughal emperor. He was brought to Delhi and sent to jail. In the jail he composed his astronomical text Grahan Mala which is the account of eclipses dates for 1088 years from 1620 AD to 2708 AD. It is said that Mughal emperor Akbar became very impressed with Hemangad Thakur for his work Grahan Mala, so he returned tax free Mithila Kingdom to the King Hemangad Thakur. When Hemangad Thakur came to Mithila with tax free kingdom, Queen Hemalata said "Today the moon of Mithila has become free from stigma, we will see and worship it." After that the people of Mithila started celebrating the festival of Chaurchan Puja with larger enthusiasm. King Hemangad Thakur, with the consultations from Pandits, declared Chaurchan as Lokaparva (Folk festivals) of the Mithila Kingdom.
