= Parmananda Thakura =

Astronomer king in Mithila

- Rajarshi
Names
- Rajarshi Parmananda Thakura
Era name and dates
- 16th century CE: 1573AD-1583 AD
Regnal name
- Maharaja Parmananda Thakura
- Kingdom: Mithila
- Kingdom: Tirhut Sarkar
- Dynasty: Khandawala
- Religion: Hinduism
- Occupation: Ruler of Tirhut Sarkar; Astronomer
- Scientist career
- Born: Madhubani district
- Education: Ancient Mithila University
- Known for: Siddhaanta Sudhaa
- Awards: Rajarshi
- Fields: Astronomy, Indian philosophy

Parmananda Thakura (Maithili: पर्मानन्द ठाकुर) (1573AD-1583 AD) was a short time ruler in the Khandawala Dynasty of the Tirhut Sarkar in Mithila. He was also an Indian astronomer from the Mithila region of the Indian subcontinent. He was honoured as a title of Rajarshi due to his scholarships. He authored an astronomical text called Siddhaanta Sudhaa. It is a Sanskrit treatise of Mithila based on the positions of planets during the Ayana period, mean and true planetary motions, and other similar topics.

== Early life ==
Parmananda was born in the royal family of the Khandawala Dynasty in Mithila. He was a son of the King Mahesha Thakura. Since the King Mahesha Thakura belongs to the Shandilya gotra, he also belongs to that gotra. He was one of the two uncles of the later King Hemangada Thakura.
