= Bhauara Kali Mandir =

Kali Mandir in Mithila

Bhauara Kali Mandir (Maithili: भौआड़ा काली मंदिर) refers to the iconic temple of Goddess Kali at Bhowara near the city of Madhubani in the Mithila region of India. It is located near the Police Line at Bhauara in the Madhubani district of Bihar. It was built by the King Maharaja Madhav Singh in Mithila. During the period of the Kingdom in Mithila, it was the personal Gosaunik Ghar for the Kuldevi Goddess Kali of the King.

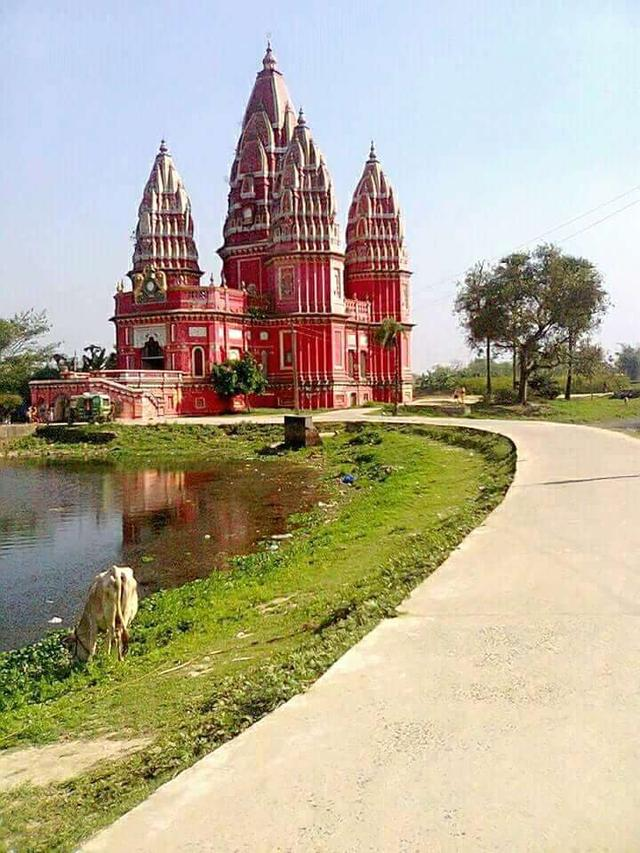
View of the Bhauara Kali Mandir near the city of Madhubani.
