= Bhowara =

Historical place in Mithila

Coordinates: 26°20′12″N 86°04′01″E

Bhowara भौआरा Bhauara
- Semi-urban
- Country: India
- State: Bihar
- Region: Mithila
- Division: Darbhanga
- District: Madhubani
- Demonym: Maithil

Languages
  - Official language: Hindi

Regional languages
  - Mother: Ancient: Maithili; Sanskrit

Bhowara (Maithili: भौआरा) or Bhauara is a historical place in the Mithila region of the Indian subcontinent. It is located near the south outskirts in the city of Madhubani in the state of Bihar in India. It was the capital of the Khandawala Dynasty for some time periods in Mithila. Presently, it has been the part of Madhubani city in Bihar.

== History ==
During the 16th-17th century CE, it was the Sukh Niwas of the King Subhankara Thakura in Mithila. Similarly, it was the capital of Maharaja Raghav Singh of the Raj Darbhanga also known as Tirhut Sarkar. In his reign, he established a locality in the capital named after him. The locality is called Raghav Nagar.

== Description ==
There is a historically old royal palace called Darbhanga Maharaja Mahal at Bhowara. Presently, it serves as the district headquarter of the Bihar Police in the Madhubani district. Nowadays, it is also known as Civil Police Line. It has been dilapidated due to the negligence of the local administration in the state. Due to the dilapidated situation of the royal palace, it is also termed as "Khofnak Mahal" that translates to The Terrifying Palace or The Dreadful Mansion by some media reports. The buildings of the royal palace holds more than 250 police personnel.

In the vicinity of Bhowara, there are several temples dedicated to Hindu deities. They are Ram Janaki Mandir, Kali Mandir, and Shree Radha Krishna Thakur Baari Mandir, etc.
