= Grahan Mala =

Sanskrit astronomical text

- Author: Acharya Hemangada Thakura
- Original title: ग्रहणमाला
- Language: Sanskrit
- Subject: Astronomy
- Genre: Astronomical treatise
- Publication date: 16th century CE
- Publication place: Mithila

The Grahan Mala (Sanskrit: ग्रहणमाला) or Grahanmala or Grahana Maalaa is a 16th century Sanskrit astronomical text that provides the dates of eclipse. It was composed by the Indian astronomer Acharya Hemangada Thakura in Mithila. He was also the ruler of the Tirhut Sarkar in the Khandawala Dynasty (Later called Raj Darbhanga) of Mithila. It provides the dates of all the Solar as well as lunar eclipse from 1620 AD to 2708 AD. The text was composed in a jail, when Hemangada Thakura was imprisoned by the Mughal emperor.

The Sanskrit astronomical text Grahan Mala provides the details of all the solar and the lunar eclipses of 1088 years between 1620 AD to 2708 AD. It was composed in the Mithilakshar script. The original manuscript of the text was stolen. Later, a print version of the text was published by the Kameshwar Singh Darbhanga Sanskrit University. The print version of the text was edited by the Maithil scholar Pandit Shri Vrajkishore Jha. It was published on 31 August 1983 on the occasion of the Krishna Janmashtami.

== History ==
Hemangada Thakura was the grand son of the King Mahesha Thakura in Mithila and the son of the later King Gopal Thakur. After the King Gopal Thakur, his son Hemangada Thakura was coronated as the ruler of the Tirhut Sarkar. It is said that the King Hemangada Thakura left paying taxes to the Mughal Empire. Then he was arrested and brought to Delhi by the Mughal officials. He was imprisoned in the jail of Delhi for five years in the conviction of not paying taxes to the Mughal Empire. During this five years of imprisonment, he started writing the calculations of the solar and lunar eclipses on the floor of the jail.

According to the book Khandwala Rajvansh by Mukund Jha Bakshi, Hemangada Thakura spent the whole days in the jail drawing astronomical figures and counting the calculations of eclipses. Whenever he was asked by the jailer regarding the drawings, he replied that he was trying to understand the movement of the moon. After that the jailer gradually spread the news that the King Hemangada Thakura was not in good mental condition and needed treatment. After learning the news, the Mughal emperor himself went to the prison to see Hemangada Thakura. When the emperor reached the prison, he saw several pictures of numbers and planets on drawn on the ground. The emperor then asked what you keep writing it all day. After that Hemangada replied that there was no other work here so he was counting the movements of the planets. He further said that he had calculated the dates of eclipses, which would occur in the next 500 years.

After listening the reply, the emperor immediately ordered his officials to provide copperplate and pen to Hemangada Thakura for composing a text on the eclipses. And he said to Hemangada Thakura that if his prediction turned out to be correct, his punishment would be pardoned. It is said that Hemangada Thakura calculated the month, date and time of the next lunar eclipse and informed that to the emperor. The lunar eclipse occurred on the same date and time as predicted by Hemangada Thakura. After that the Mughal emperor not only released him from the imprisonment, but also exempted them from paying any further taxes.

== Words and terms ==
In the text, the words or terms used for dates and timings are denoted by Indic terms. In order to describe eclipse, the years of the eclipses dates are mentioned in the Shaka Samvat and written as Shaake. Similarly, the day of the date is mentioned as Dyuvrinda.

In the text, the Dyuvrinda has been prepared by calculating from the Mesha Sankranti (solar ingress into Aries) of each year within the Shaka Samvat year up to the day of the eclipse. It signifies the number of days passed from the Mesh Sankranti of that year. Following this, the duration in dandas and palas of the lunar day—either Purnima (full moon) or Amavasya (new moon)—on which the eclipse occurs is recorded in the text. Following the duration—expressed in dandas and palas, the nakshatra (lunar mansion) prevailing on the day of the eclipse starting with Ashvini is recorded in the text.

Similarly, following the values of nakshatra, the danda and pala values of the Vishkambhadi Yoga of that day is mentioned. Following the value of the Yoga expressed in danda and pala units, the day of the week (such as Sunday, etc.) on which the eclipse occurs is mentioned, along with the number of elapsed days of the then current solar month since the immediately preceding Sankranti (solar ingress) day.

== Description of eclipses ==
The first eclipse in the text is mentioned of the year Shaka Samvat 1542, which is equivalent to the 1620 AD in the western calendar. According to the text, it was happened on the Purnima of the Jyestha nakshatra having Dyuvrinda number 67 in that year. The danda and pala values of the Purnima is 60|00.

== Modern studies ==
In the modern era, a national commission (2014-2022) was constituted to study the classical astronomical text Grahan Mala in the Indian National Science Academy. It was led by Vanaja V. The research project is known as "A Critical Study of Hemangada Thakkura’s Grahaṇamala". Similarly, the Indian mathematician cum science author Balachandra Rao and the professor Shailaja Mahadeva, studied the text of Grahan Mala and verified the dates of the eclipses mentioned in the text to be correct, in their joint research paper.
