= Balachandra Rao =

Indian science author (1944–2025)

- Born: 24 December 1944
- Died: 14 May 2025 (aged 80)
- Other name: S Balachandra Rao

Balachandra Rao (Devanagari: बालचंद्र राव; 24 December 1944 – 14 May 2025) was an Indian mathematician at National Institute of Advanced Studies in Bangalore. He authored several books in the field of science, astronomy, mathematics. He was also trained in Sanskrit literature. He dedicated his life towards decoding the rich intellectual heritage of the ancient India. He was also called S Balachandra Rao.

His quotes on Vedanga Jyotish,

“It is not just we who say that the Indian numeral system is a remarkable contribution. It has been acknowledged by European critics and mathematics historians, the world over. However, our affair with mathematics and astronomy dates back to 1200 BC, when Vedanga Jyotisa originated.”

— Balachandra Rao

== Background ==
Rao was born on 24 December 1944 at Tyāgarti (Thāgarti) near Sagar in state of Karnataka in India. He started his career as a professor of mathematics at National College in Bangalore. He later became the principal of the college. After retirement, he served at National Institute of Advanced Studies as a mathematician. Later he joined Gandhi Centre of Science and Human Values in Bengaluru. There he became the director of the institute.

Rao died on 14 May 2025, at the age of 80.

== Researches and notable works ==
In 1992, Rao started his journey of research in the field of the ancient Indian mathematics. He studied in details about the contributions of ancient India to science and astronomy. In an interview, he dismissed the idea of the ancient Vimana Sasthra which got popularity in the recent Indian Science Congress.

After his research on the Vedanga Jyotish, he pointed out that there should be some improvements in the parameters and the values in the age-old computational algorithms of the Vedanga Jyotish to get an accurate result as the orbits and the angular velocities of the heavenly bodies had changed with time. He quoted,

“The algorithms in Vedanga Jyotisa give a fairly accurate result. If we predict an eclipse or solstice using it, the result will differ by a minute. This is because the orbits of heavenly bodies have become larger with time and angular velocities have changed. We improve the parameters and refine the values in the age-old computational algorithms, to get an accurate result.”

Rao extensively researched the ancient Sanskrit astronomical and mathematical texts of India. He unraveled the complex astronomical algorithms of the ancient Indian texts. He clarified the obscure ancient Sanskrit astronomical and mathematical texts for easy access of these texts to modern readers. In his research, he revealed the sophisticated knowledge of the classical Indian science. He also demonstrated the precise methods used by the classical scholars like Aryabhata, Bhaskara, and Varahamihira for calculating planetary positions, eclipses, and timekeeping.

Apart from decoding the rich intellectual heritage of the ancient India, he also combated and criticized the false claims and misinformation in the name of Vedic science. In this regard, he determined himself to separate the facts from the fiction claims and authored a book called Vedic Mathematics and Science in Vedas to resolve the issues. In this book, he examined the popular claims meticulously. Through his systematic investigation about the intricate aspects of the Indian classical astronomy, he clarified what were genuine and what were myth.

Balachandra Rao along with his colleague Shailaja Mahadeva studied the dates of the eclipses mentioned in the classical astronomical text Grahan Mala and verified these dates to be correct, in their joint research paper.
