= Aripan =

Cultural art of Mithila

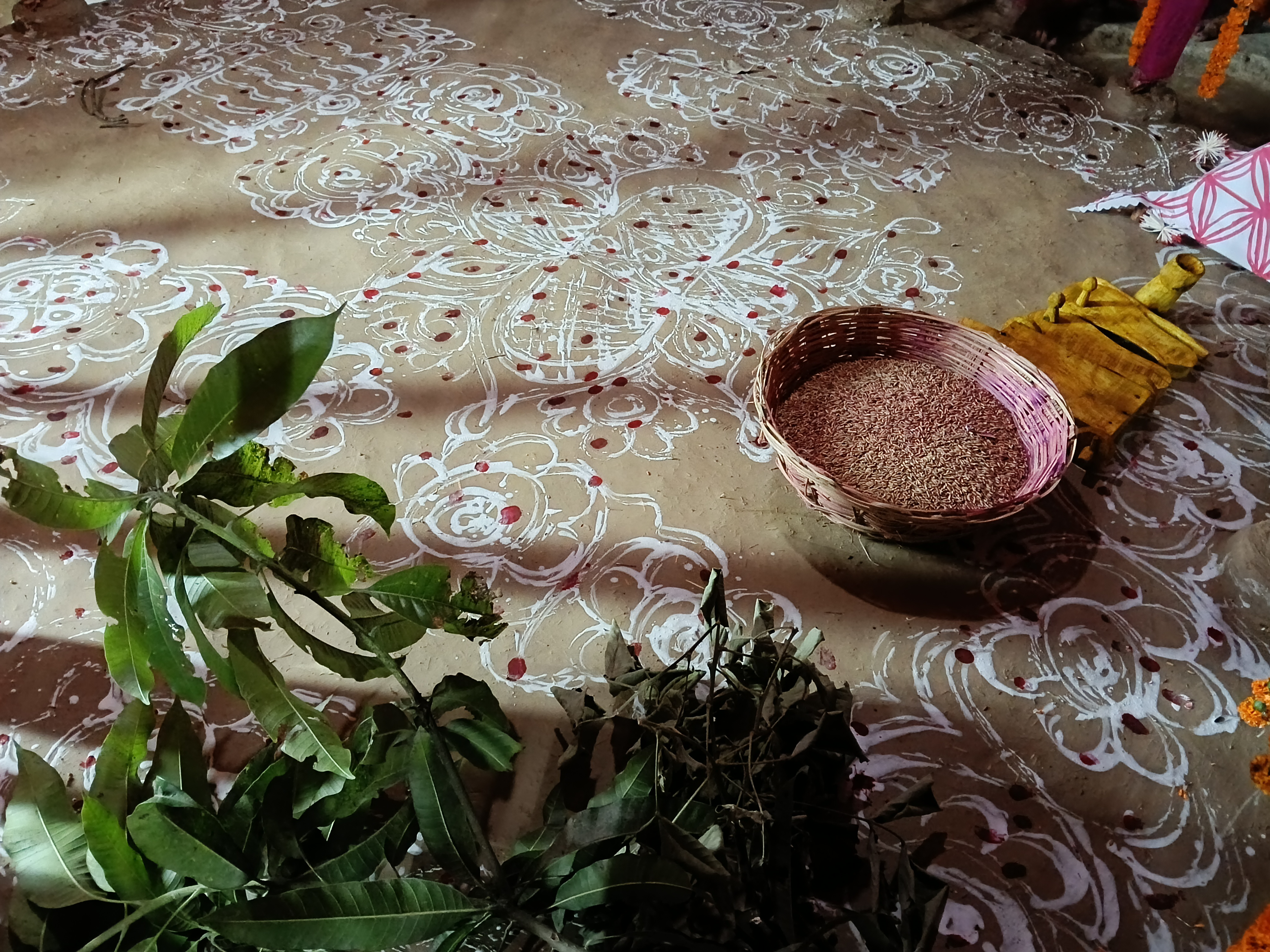
Aripan drawn by a Maithil Brahmin women on a Maithil Upanayan marwa (Mandap) at Basuki Bihari village in the Mithila region.

Aripan (Maithili: अरिपन) is a traditional floor painting art form from the Mithila region of the Indian subcontinent, characterized by geometric, finger-drawn patterns made with rice paste called as pithar during rituals. It is drawn during Maithil Vivah, Mundan, Maithil Upanayan, Kojagra, festivals, and puja ceremonies, etc in the region by Maithil women. It is an important part of the Maithil culture in the subcontinent. The tradition of Aripan is believed to date back to the Vedic period. It has been mentioned in the holy texts of Vedas, and Puranas, etc. In the Mithila region, it is believed that the Devatas love Aripan's art. In this folk art, deities are depicted through artwork. In the Aripan painting, turmeric and vermillion are also used to add colour to it.

== Description ==
The Aripan, prepared from white pithar and decorated with red vermilion is a cultural heritage of Mithila, which reflects the Indian culture. Its shape varies according to the different rituals and ceremonies.

First of all, some raw rice grains are dipped into water and left it for some time in the water. After that the wet rice is grinded and paste is prepared. This paste of raw rice is called as pithar. The pithar is used to draw different shapes and images of the aripan using fingers by women, according to the rules of the rituals and ceremonies. Red vermilion is used to fill colour and to make aripan more decorative.

In the region of Mithila, it is all-pervasive that commencement of any auspicious ceremony is possible only after giving aripan. During a Puja ceremony, the Aripan painting on the floor depicts purification and sanctification of the land where pooja items and articles are kept for worship.

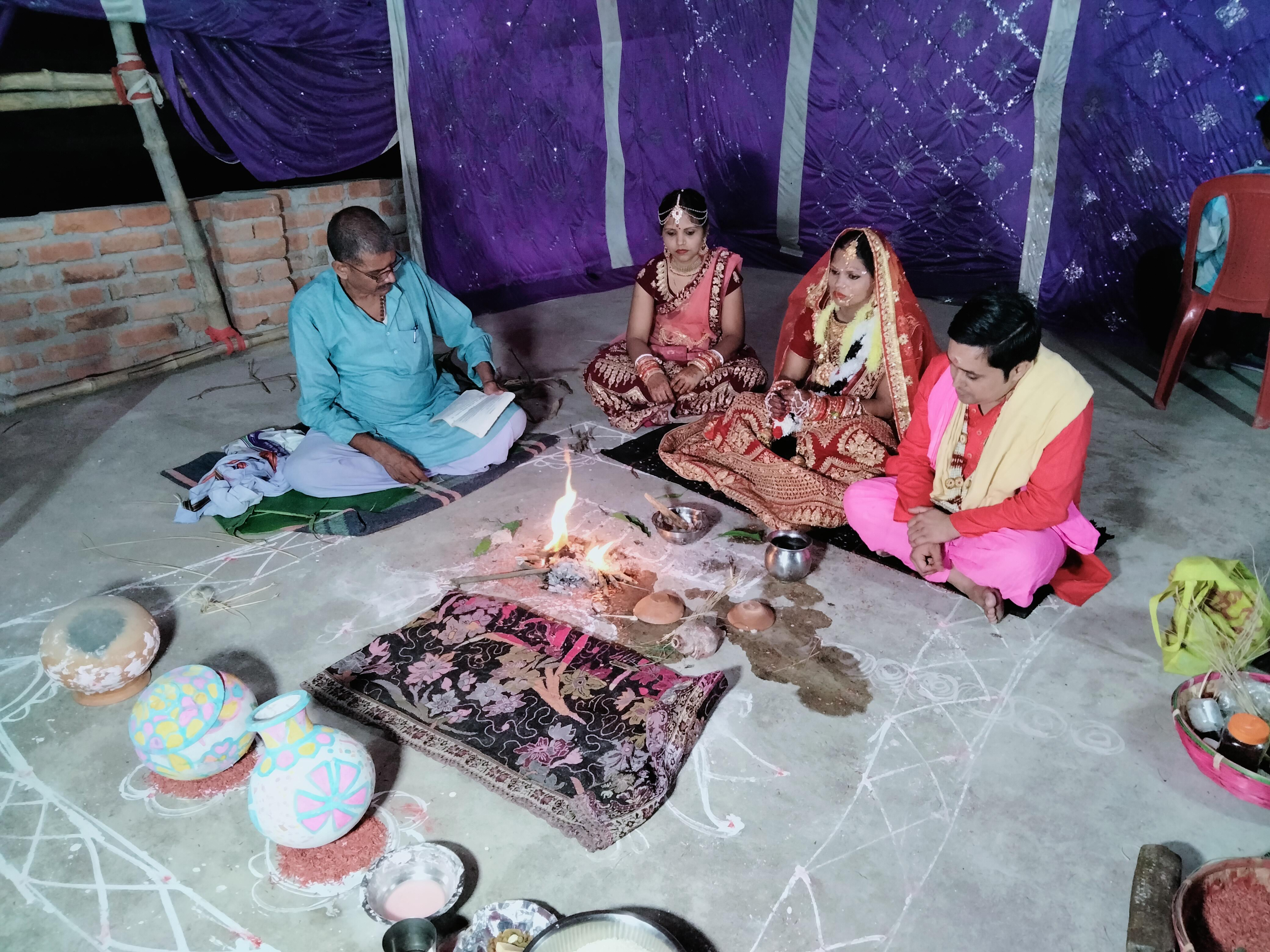
View of the Aripan painting during the auspicious rituals of a Maithil Vivah Puja in the region.

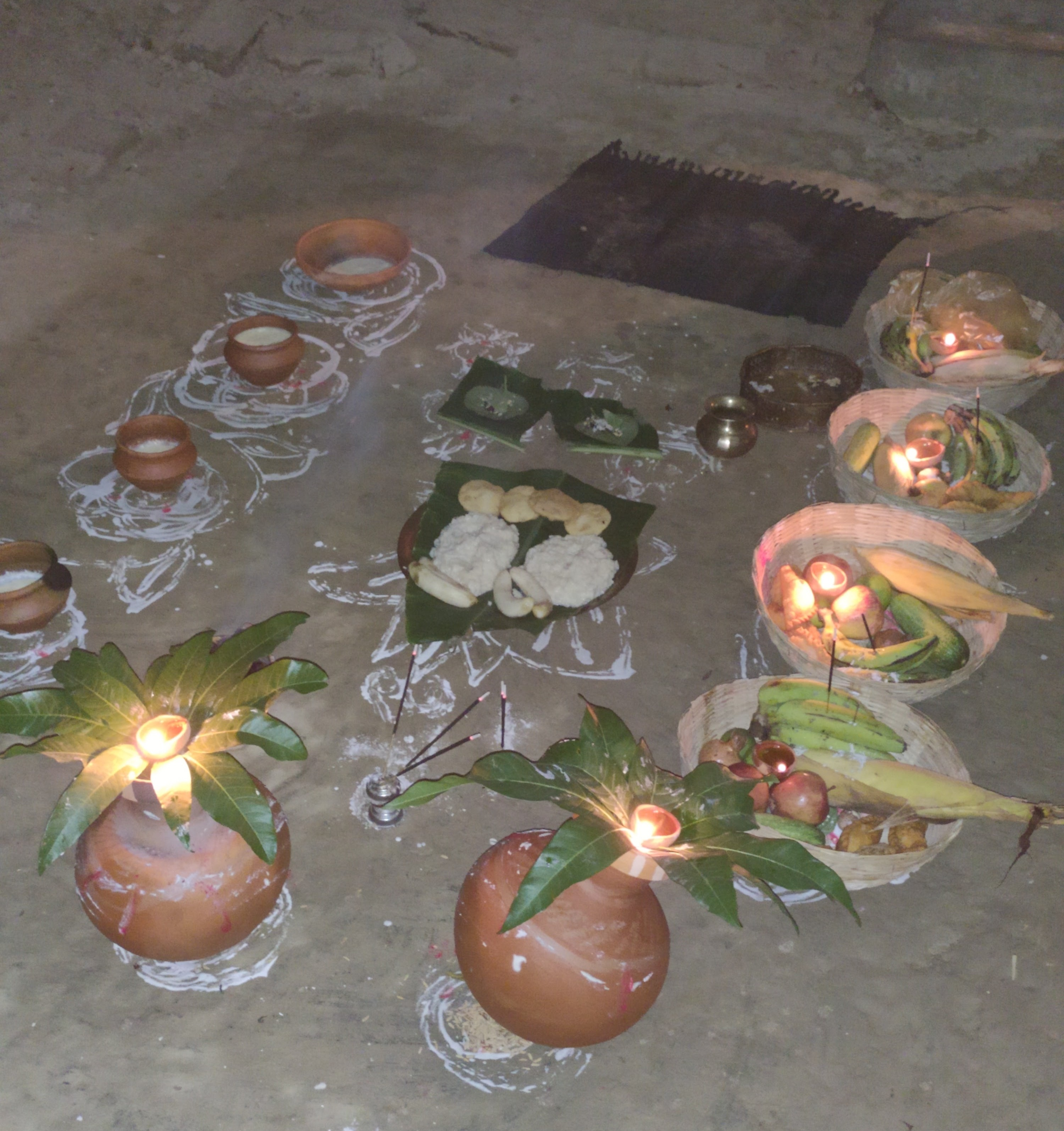
View of aripan drawing during the Chaurchan Puja.

== Origin ==
The tradition of making aripan on different sacred ceremonies originated in the Mithila region of the subcontinent. The tradition of Swastika Aripan is believed to date back to the Vedic period. In the Vedas, the Aripan is mentioned as Sarvatobhadra. Although it originated in the Vedic period, its present form was determined during the reign of the Karnat dynasty in Mithila, which continues to this day.

According to legend, the King Janaka of Videha first introduced the practice of drawing aripan on the occasion of the marriage between Lord Rama and Goddess Sita in Mithila. In the text Bhavishya Purana, there is mention of the worship of Goddess Gauri (Parvati) and Lord Ganesha seated on a golden idol of an elephant in the center of the 'mandala' (aripan). In the text Brahma Purana, the word used for Aripan is Bhumi-Shabha which translates to "beauty of land". Similarly, in the text Garuda Purana, there is mention of the practice of making aripan near a Tulsi plant. The Tulsi plant is considered as a sacred plant in Hinduism. In the text, it is believed that health-giving air emanates from the Tulsi plant, so aripan is made under it. It is practiced even today in the region.

== Types ==
There are many types of Aripan, which are prepared in different ways on different occasions. These are Tusari, Sanjh, Sashti, Kojagra, Deepavali (Sukh-Ratna), Swastika, Panchdal, Saptdal, and Ashtdal.
