= Raghunandan Dasa =

Prominent scholar from Mithila

Mahamahopadhya Raghunandan Dasa
- रघुनंदन दास

Personal life
- Born: 16th century
- Era: Mughal Empire in the subcontinent
- Region: Mithila
- Education: Sanskrit and Vedic learning in Mithila
- Known for: Gifting the throne of Mithila as Gurudakshina to his Guru Mahesh Thakur
- Other name: Raghunandan Jha

Religious life
- Religion: Hinduism

Religious career
- Teacher: Mahesh Thakur

Raghunandan Dasa (Maithili: रघुनंदन दास) was an eminent scholar from the region of Mithila in the Indian subcontinent. He was a disciple of the other contemporary scholar Mahesh Thakur in the Mithila region. He was a prominent Sanskrit and Vedic scholar. He was also the scholar of Maithili literature. He is well known for gifting the throne of Mithila as a Gurudakshina to his Guru Mahesh Thakur. He was the author of the Uttara Ramacharit works of Bhavabhuti. He is also known as Raghunandan Jha.

== Debate at Akbar's court ==
Raghunandan was the disciple of Mahesh Thakur. According to the book History of Mithila written by Mukund Kumar Jha, once a Muslim scholar at the court of King Akbar, thrown a challenge for discussion on the philosophy of Hinduism. In this regard, Birbal suggested the name of Mahesh Thakur for discussion. An invitation was sent to Mahesh Thakur for discussion on the Hindu philosophy. Mahesh Thakur along with his disciple Raghunandan Jha went to the court of King Akbar in Fatehpur Sikri, after receiving the invitation. After their arrival at the court, they were introduced to the King Akbar by Raja Man Singh.

The emperor Akbar was very pleased with both of them to talk. Then, he allowed Raghunandan for discussion with the Muslim scholar at his court. The discussion continued for three days in which Raghunandan Jha finally got victory. After the victory of Raghunandan Jha, the Mughal emperor Akbar was very pleased with his scholarship. Then, the emperor Akbar released a farmaan confirming Raghunandan Jha as the caretaker of the Tirhut (Mithila) territory. The Maithil scholar Raghunandan Jha declined to become the caretaker of Tirhut Sarkar (Mithila) and gifted it to his Guru Mahesh Thakur. He requested to the emperor Akbar for a fresh farman in the favour of his Guru Mahesh Thakur. It is said that since the farmaan was already released in the name of Raghunandan Jha, therefore some difficulties stood up in the transfer, but by the intervention of the emperor's mother, Raja Man Singh and Birbal, a new farman was initiated in the favour of Mahesh Thakur. According to scholars, the original farman in the favour of Mahesh Thakur is not available now but its contents are found in the Mahzarnama of Chaudhari Sundar Thakur dated 1652.
