= Chaudhary post in Mithila =

Administrative designation in Mithila during mediaeval period

Chaudhary
- Creation date: 12th century
- Creation: During reign of Gangadeva
- Present holder: Hereditary title among Maithil Brahmins
- Seat: Dih
- Former seat: Pargana
- Formerly (before Independence of India) "Chaudhary of Pargana", currently hereditary title

The post of Chaudhary (Maithili: चौधरी) or Chaudhari in Mithila refers to the mediaeval period's administrative designation prevalent in the region since the Karnat dynasty. The Maithil king Mahesh Thakur was a prominent Chaudhary during the period of the Mughal Empire in the Indian subcontinent. It was an important position in the local administration of the region. Several important roles and duties were designated to the Chaudharies in the region. These roles or duties were a kind of police officer, revenue collector, chief treasury officer or some times ruler. The post of Chaudhari is also mentioned in the Mahzarnama of the Mughal Empire in the subcontinent. The initial role of the prominent Chaudhary Mahesh Thakur was as a care taker of the Tirhut Sarkar. The Chaudharies in Mithila were appointed from the eminent Zamindars in the region. In the department of police, officers were reporting to the Chaudhari of the Pargana in the region.

== History ==
In the region of Mithila, the post of Chaudhary came into existence during the reign of the King Gangadeva in the Karnat dynasty. It was the era of around 12th century. He was the second ruler in the dynasty. He instituted the post of Chaudhary for the purpose of revenue collection in the region. The history of the post Chaudhary in the Mithila region can also be traced since Mahesh Thakur and Raghunandan Dasa. The position of Chaudhary was one of prestige and influence in the region for which the appointment was made during the 16th century.

The title of Chaudhary among Maithil community is traced since the arrival of Muslim in the region. During the mediaeval period, in the administrative structure of the Tirhut Sarkar, to collect revenue and facilitate governance in the pargana, a collector was appointed, who bore the title of Chaudhary, in the region. The Chaudhary served as the chieftain or Mukhiya of his pargana. For example, the Chaudharies of Singhwar is traced since the time of Babar in the subcontinent. The mool of the Chaudharies in Singhwar was Dighvaisandaddapur. Similarly, Sundar Thakur was a prominent Chaudhary during the 17th century in Mithila.

== Functionaries and duties ==
According to Parmatma Sharan, the post of Chaudhari signified "a large number of functionaries in the political and social life of India". A Chaudhari was the head of a pargana having duties of revenue collector and police administration. In the Mithila region, the Maithil Brahmins were majorly Chaudharies of the parganas in the region. Most of the Maithil Brahmin Chaudharies were small zamindars in the region. According to the writings of the Maithil poet Vidyapati, the post of Chaudhary appears to be represented pargana administration in the interests and needs of the farmers in the pargana. The Chaudharies were associated with various types of revenue-related duties.

The post of Chaudhary mentioned in the Mughal documents Mahzarnama denotes to the care taker of the entire Tirhut Sarkar appointed by the Mughal emperor, having larger territory than the Chaudhary in a pargana.
