= Subhankara Thakura =

Astronomer king in Mithila

- Mahamahopadhya
- Successor: Purushottama Thakura
- House: Mithila Kingdom
- Dynasty: Khandawala Dynasty
- Father: Mahesha Thakura
- Religion: Hinduism
- Occupation: Author, astronomer and poet

Subhankara Thakura (Maithili: सुभांकर ठाकुर) was a king of Khandawala Dynasty in Mithila. He was also an astronomer as well as Sanskrit litterateur. He authored the astronomical text Tithi-Nirnaya. He was honoured by the title Mahamahopadhya. He also wrote musical treatise called Sangita Damodara in 1610 AD. Due to his association with literature and music, he was also called as Subhankara Kavi. The Indic term Kavi means poet. He was succeeded by his eldest son Purushottama Thakura.

== Early life ==
Subhankara Thakura was born in the royal family of the Khandawala Dynasty in Mithila. He was a Maithil Brahmin and belonged to the Shandilya gotra in Mithila. He was one of the five sons of the King Mahesha Thakura.

== Rule ==
Subhankara Thakura ruled Mithila from 1584 AD to 1619 AD.
