= Mahesha Thakura =

Astronomer King of Mithila

- Maharaja
- Reign: 1556 AD - 1558 AD
- Successor: Gopala Thakura
- Successor: Hemangada Thakura
- Successor: Parmananda Thakura
- Died: 1558 AD
Regnal name
- Maharaja Mahesha Thakura
- House: Tirhut Sarkar
- House: Raj Darbhanga
- Dynasty: Khandwala Dynasty
- Father: Chandrapati Thakura
- Religion: Hinduism
- Occupation: Astronomer and Philosopher
- Scientist career
- Born: Madhubani district
- Education: Ancient Mithila University
- Known for: Atīcārādinirṇayaḥ
- Awards: Mahamahopadhyay
- Fields: Astronomy, Indian philosophy
- Notable students: Raghunandan Dasa

Mahesha Thakura was the ruler of Mithila in the 16th century. He made his capital at Bhaur which is in the northwest of Sarisab-Pahi and Rajgram. He also wrote some treatises and commentaries on astronomy and Indian philosophy. He was gifted the Kingdom of Mithila for his scholarly wisdom by the Mughal emperor Akbar. He established the Khandwala dynasty in Mithila, later known as Raj Darbhanga, in 1557.

== Early life ==
Mahesha Thakura was the middle son of Rajpandita Chandrapati Thakura. His mother name was Dhira. Chandrapati Thakura was Rajpandita (Royal Priest) during the reign of Akbar. He belonged to Shandilya Gotra in Maithil Brahmin. His mool was Kharaure Bhaur. Chandrapati Thakura was living in Garh Mandla which is presently in Madhya Pradesh.

== Life at Garha Mandla ==
Mahesha Thakura was a priest at the court of Dalapatishah in Garha Mandla. He was a priest even during the time of Rani Durgavati. Since he was the scholar of philosophy as well as Karmakanda, he used to narrate the Puranas to the queen Rani Durgavati every day. It is said that during the reign of Rani Durgavati, Mahesha Thakura left Garha Mandla and went to Mithila to establish his kingdom in the region. This kingdom was later called as Darbhanga Raj.

== Throne in Mithila ==
It is said that the Mughal emperor Akbar was very influenced by the wisdom of Raghunandana Dasa and gifted him the throne of Mithila. Raghunandan Dasa, in turn, gifted the throne of Mithila to his teacher Mahesha Thakura as Gurudakshina.

Some scholars claim that Mahesha Thakura's father Chandrapati Thakura was the priest at the court of the Mughal emperor Akbar and the emperor asked Chandrapati Thakura to advise any name of his son for the caretaker of Mithila. Then Chandrapati Thakura advised Akbar his middle son Mahesha Thakura as the caretaker of Mithila. It said that the Mughal emperor Akbar was also very influenced with the wisdom of Mahesha Thakura so he granted the throne of Mithila to Mahesha Thakura as the caretaker. Initially he was appointed as the Chaudhary of the Tirhut Sarkar in Mithila. Mahesha Thakura then became the ruler of Mithila and established Khadwala Dynasty in Mithila on the day of Ramnavami.

== Coronation ==
The coronation of the King Mahesha Thakura was held on the day of Ram Navami. The year of the event of the coronation varies in several documents. It varies from 1556 AD to 1558 AD. It has been mentioned in the introductory portion of the Maithili Bhasa Ramayana by Chanda Jha, in the Shamakara Dipika by Mahavaiyakarana Harshanatha Jha and the Rajavali, etc. In these documents, his coronation year is mentioned in Shake Samvat year but not in AD.

== Jurisdiction ==
The description of the region under the jurisdiction of the King Mahesh Thakur is traced from the quote

"az gang ta sang wa az kosi ta ghosi"

— Tahir Hussain Ansari, Reference 41 in the book, Mughal Administration and the Zamindars of Bihar

According to the quote, the areas under the jurisdiction of Mahesh Thakur was "from the Ganga in the south to the mountains in the north (up to the present Nepal) and similarly from the Kosi river in the east (in the present district of Purnia) to all of the Tirhut, bounded by the river Gandak at Hajipur".

== Legacy ==
Mahesha Thakura established the Khandwala Dynasty, which continued for nearly 400 years (from 16th century CE to 20th century CE) in the Mithila region till the independence of India. He is well known for the institution of Dhaut Pariksha at his court to examine the scholarship of the scholars in his kingdom.

== Scholarly works ==
Apart from being the ruler of the Mithila region, Mahesha Thakura was also a renowned scholar of Sanskrit literature, Indian philosophy and astronomy. He was the author several treatises and commentaries. He wrote a commentary Aloka Pradipa on the Nyaya Aloka commentary text of the 15th century eminent Naiyayika Pakshadhara Mishra. Similarly he also wrote a commentary text Darpan on the Tattavachintamani text of the Naiyayika Gangesha Upadhyaya.

Mahesha Thakura also wrote the texts Dayasara and Tethitattava Chintamani. He wrote an astronomical text known as Atīcārādinirṇayaḥ. It is still relevant for the Maithil Vivah and considered as an authority text on finding auspicious time for marriages in the Mithila region. He also authored a historical book called Sarvades Vitrant Samgrah in Sanskrit language on the history of the reign of Mughal emperor Akbar. Similarly, he wrote a Sanskrit text called Utkal Mahatmya, whose original manuscript was later stolen from the library of the Kameshwar Singh Darbhanga Sanskrit University.

== Family ==
According to the book Anthropology of Ancient Hindu Kingdoms written by Makhan Jha, the King Mahesha Thakura was married to six wives. He had five sons. They were Ramchandra Thakura, Gopal Thakura, Achyuta Thakura, Parmananda Thakura and Subhankara Thakura.
