= Hemangada Thakura =

Astronomer King of Mithila

- Mahamahopadhyay
- Reign: 1571 AD - 1590 AD
- Predecessor: Gopal Thakura
- Born: 1530
- Died: Unknown
- Maharani: Hemlata Devi
Regnal name
- मिथिला नरेश ( King of Mithila )
- House: Khandwala Dynasty
- Father: Gopal Thakura
- Religion: Hinduism
- Occupation: Astronomer
- Scientific career
- Education: Ancient Mithila University
- Known for: Grahan Mala
- Awards: Mahamahopadhyay
- Fields: Astronomy

Notes
- Author of the Astronomical Treatise on the Eclipses known as "Grahan Mala"

Hemangada Thakura was the King of the Tirhut Sarkar in the Mithila region of the Indian subcontinent between 1571 AD to 1590 AD. He was also an Indian Astronomer in 16th century. He was famous for his astronomical treatise Grahan Mala. The book told the dates of the eclipses for 1088 years from 1620 AD to 2708 AD. The dates of lunar and solar eclipse that Hemangada Thakur had fixed on the basis of his unique calculations are proving to be true till date.

== Early life ==
Hemangada Thakura was born in a Maithil Brahmin family in Mithila region of present Bihar state in India. He born in 1530 AD. He was the grandson of Mahamahopadhyay Mahesha Thakura and the son of Gopal Thakur. Mahesh Thakur was also the King of Mithila in Khandwala Dynasty.

== History ==
After the abdication of his father Gopal Thakur, he was handed over the throne of Mithila in 1571 AD. But he was not interested in governance. In 1572 AD, he was arrested and taken to Delhi and imprisoned for not paying taxes on time to the Mughal Empire. It is said that in prison he started writing mathematical calculations on the surface of the floor of the jail, then the jailer asked him about the mathematical figures drawn on the floor. Hemangada Thakura replied that he was trying to understand the motion of the Moon. Then the jailer spread the news that Hemangada Thakura had been mental mad. After hearing the news, the Mughal Emperor himself went to see Hemangada Thakura and asked about the mathematical calculations and figures drawn on the floor. Then Hemangada Thakura replied that he had calculated the dates of the eclipses for the next 500 years. After hearing the reply, the emperor immediately granted copperplate and pen to him for writing the calculations and told him that if his calculations became true, then he would be released from the prison. There in prison, he composed his famous book Grahan Mala which explained the eclipses for 1088 years. He predicated the date and time of the next lunar eclipse and informed the emperor. The prediction of the next lunar eclipse came to true on the same date and time as calculated by him. On composing this book, the Mughal emperor not only released him, but also returned the tax-free kingdom of Mithila.

== Discovery in Astronomy ==
Hemangada Thakura calculated the dates of the eclipses for 1088 years from 1620 AD to 2708 AD on the basis of his unique calculations. The eclipses dates have been proved to be true till date. He composed an astronomical treatise book known as Grahan Mala which explains the dates of the eclipses. In making Panchang, scholars and Pandits take helps of this book. The manuscript of the book was preserved in Kameshwar Singh Darbhanga Sanskrit University, which has been stolen a few years back. By the way, in 1983 itself, the university had published this book, which is present in various libraries. Indian National Science Academy started a research project through national commission ( 2014 - 2022 ) by Vanaja V on the astronomical treatise Grahan Mala. The research project is known as “A Critical Study of Hemangada Thakkura’s Grahaṇamala” .
