= Tirhut Sarkar =

Mediaeval period administrative division Sarkar in Mithila

Sarkar of Tirhut तिरहुत सरकार
- Capital: First Capital Nanpura and Last Capital Darbhanga
- Official languages: Language - Maithili; Scripts - Tirhuta or Mithilakshar
- Elite and Ancient language: Sanskrit
- Religion: Hinduism
- Demonym: Maithil or Tirhutiya
- Type: Mediaeval period royal or Zamindari administrative division in India
- Government: Monarchy
  - First King: Nanyadeva
  - Last King: Maharaja Kameshwar Singh
- Maharaja or Chaudhary
  - Dynasty: 1. Karnat Dynasty, 2. Oiniwar Dynasty, 3. Khandawala Dynasty

Several times Independent, Mughal Empire and British Raj
- Today part of: India and Nepal

The Tirhut Sarkar (Maithili: तिरहुत सरकार) or the Sarkar of Tirhut (1097 AD - 1947 AD) in the Indian subcontinent refers to the administrative division during the mediaeval period in the Mithila region of north Bihar and southern Nepal. It was a subah in the region of the eastern India. For some certain periods, it may was smaller than the rank of Subah as being the part of the Behar Subah. Its history is traced back to the period of the Karnat Dynasty in the region. It included around or more than 110 parganas. It was later called Raj Darbhanga during the period of the Khandawala dynasty in the Mithila region.

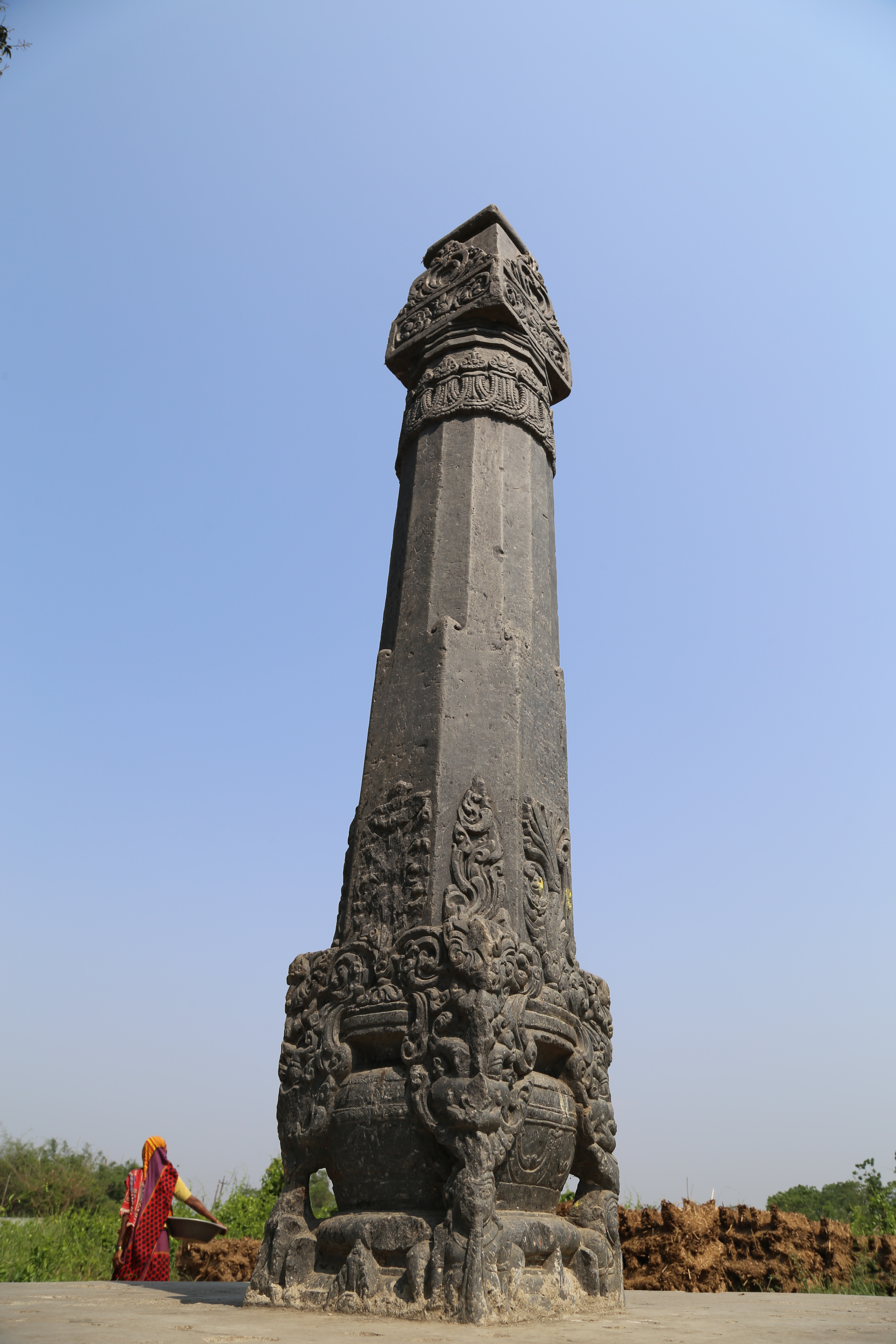
Iconic pillar of the Karnat Dynasty in the early capital Simraungadh of the Tirhut Sarkar.

The Sarkar of Tirhut was the biggest Sarkar in the region of North Bihar during the period of Mughal Empire in the Indian subcontinent. It contained 102 Mahals during that period. Its headquarter was established in Darbhanga.

Depiction of The region of Tirhut Sarkar, 1912 Cambridge Historical Atlas Map of India.

== History ==
=== Karnat Dynasty ===
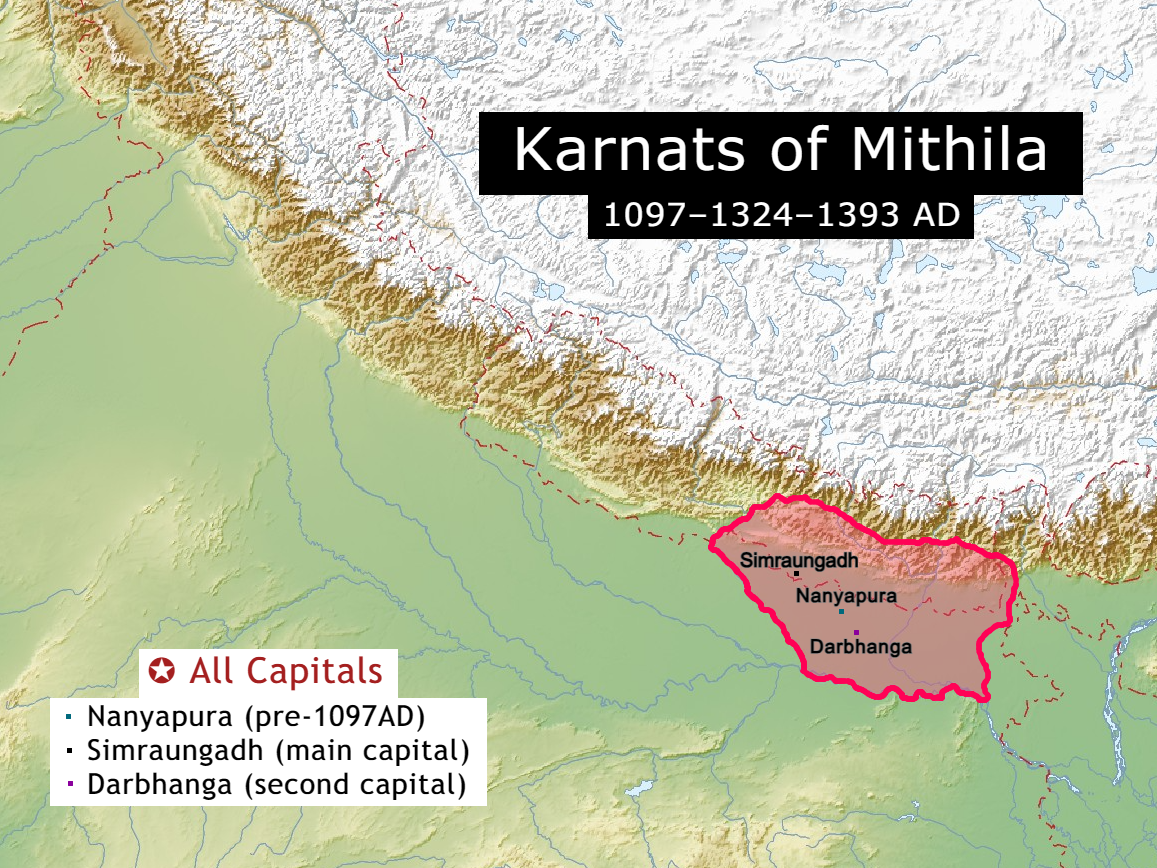
Map of the Karnat Dynasty in Mithila

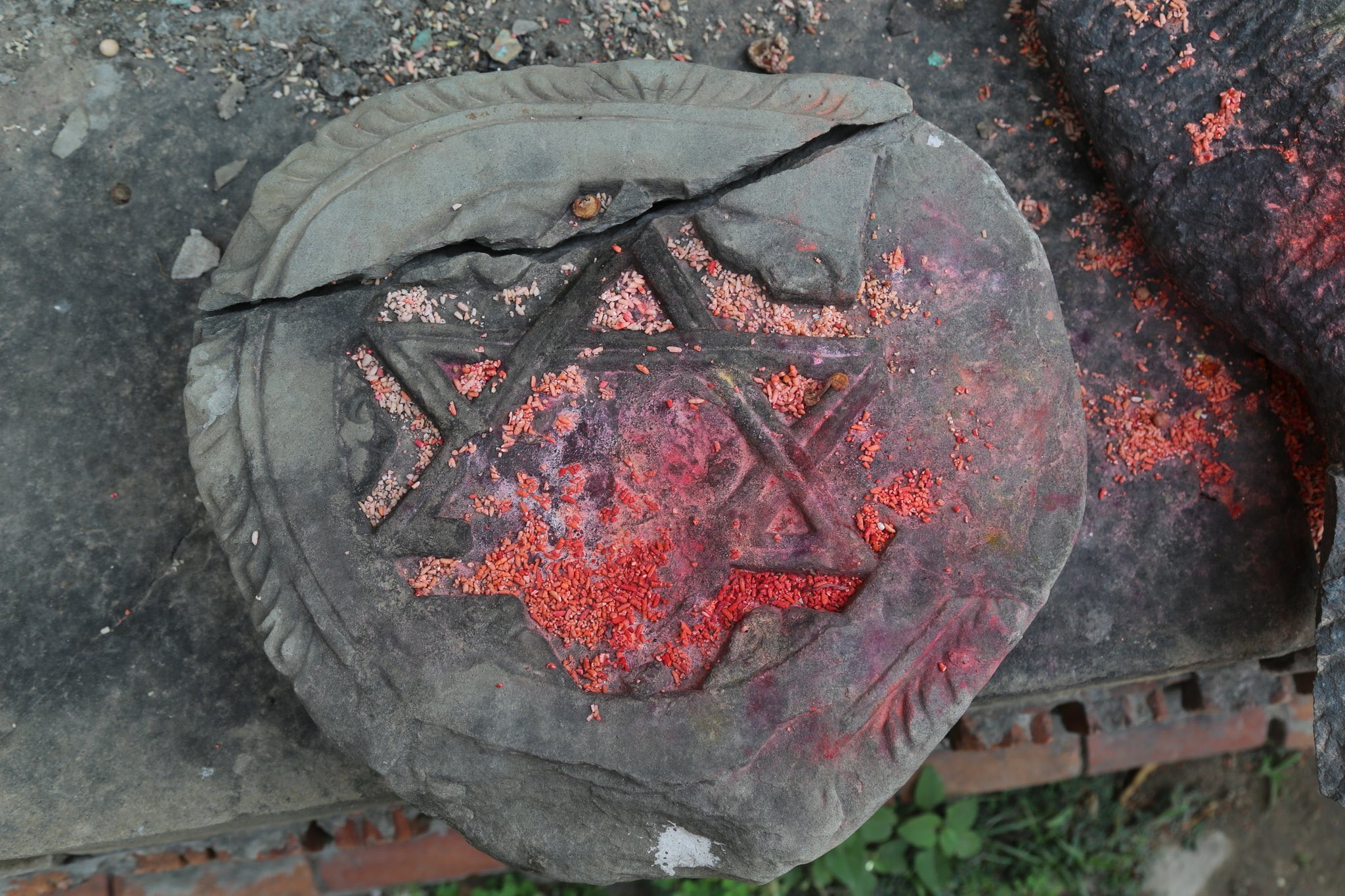
The official seal known as Shatkona of the Karnat Dynasty in the Tirhut Sarkar. The remains found at Simraungadh.

The foundation of the Tirhut Sarkar as an sovereign political entity in Mithila is traced since the founder ruler Nanyadeva. He established himself as a ruler in 1097 and made Nanpura as his initial capital to rule the region. Later, he shifted his capital to Simraungadh in the Mithila Kingdom. The legacy of his monarchy was carried by the dynasty rule known as Karnat Dynasty.

After Nanyadeva, his son Gangadeva became the second ruler of the kingdom in the Karnat Dynasty. During the same period, his brother Malladeva established other smaller ruling entity based in Bheet-Bhagwanpur in the region. But his history is not well documented. He is also known as forgotten King of the region. The history of Gangadeva is more significant in the dynasty. He made Darbhanga as his second capital. He constituted fiscal divisions for the first time in the territorial jurisdiction of his kingdom.

Before the fall of the Karnat Dynasty, the Tirhut Sarkar was ruled by the six rulers of the dynasty. The last ruler of the Karnat Dynasty was Harisimhadeva.

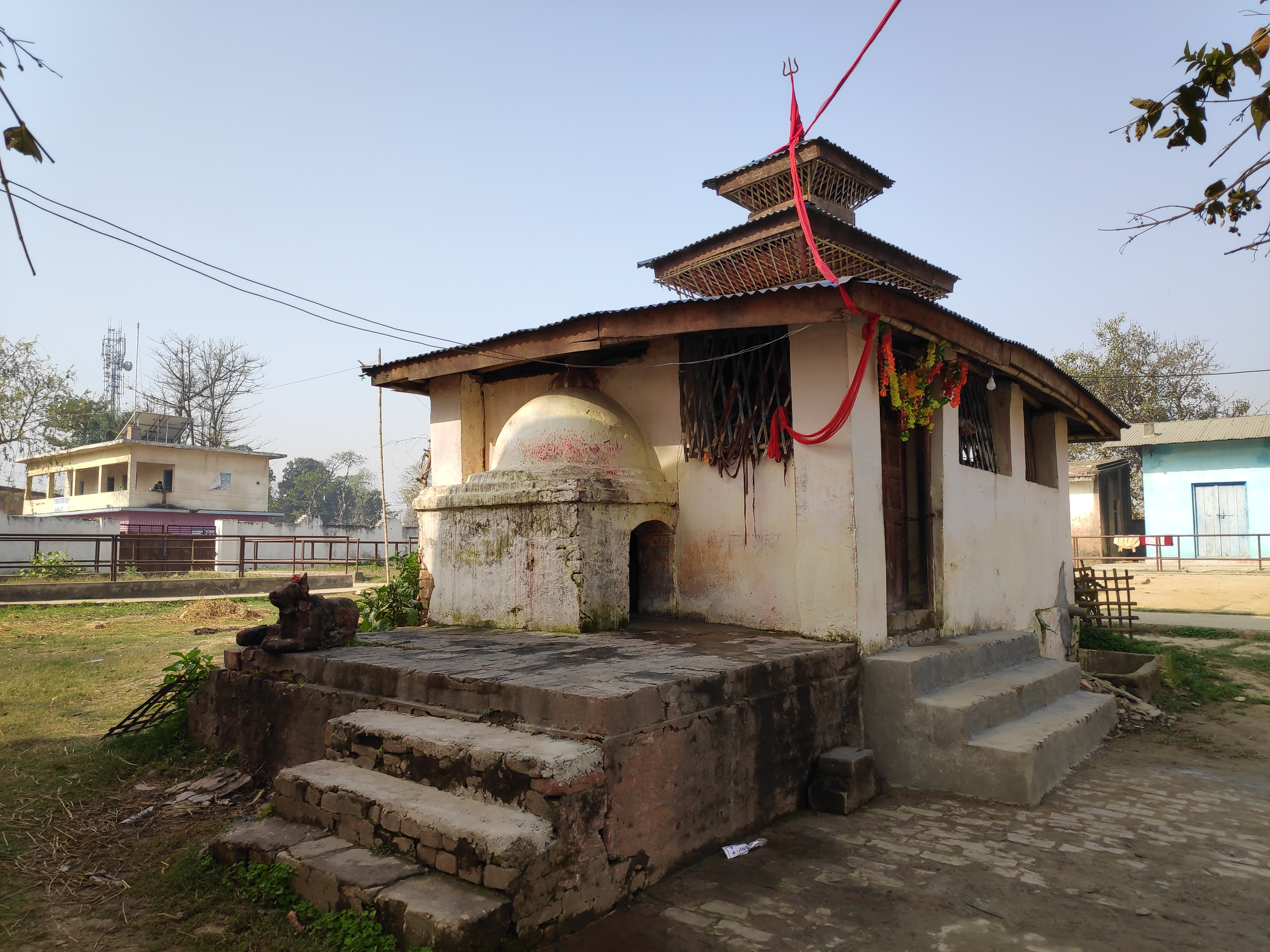
View of an ancient Lord Shiva temple in Simraungadh

=== Annexation by Delhi Sultanate ===
In 1323, Tughlak Shah, the emperor of Delhi, invaded on the Tirhut Sarkar with his victorious forces. This invasion led to the end of the Karnat Dynasty and subsequently to the end of the independence of the Tirhut Sarkar. The Delhi Sultanate emperor along with his victorious forces, captured the palace of the Simraungadh established by the Karnat Dynasty. The King Harisimhadeva was forced to flee towards the Kathmandu valley in Nepal. After the victory over the Karnat Dynasty, the Delhi Sultanate placed the Maithil Brahmin scholar Kameshwar Thakur on the throne of the Tirhut Sarkar. The Maithil Brahmin scholar Kameshwar Thakur was previously the Rajpandita (chief priest) at the court of the Karnat King Harisimhadeva. He established Thakur Dynasty also known as Oiniwar Dynasty.

=== Oiniwar Dynasty ===
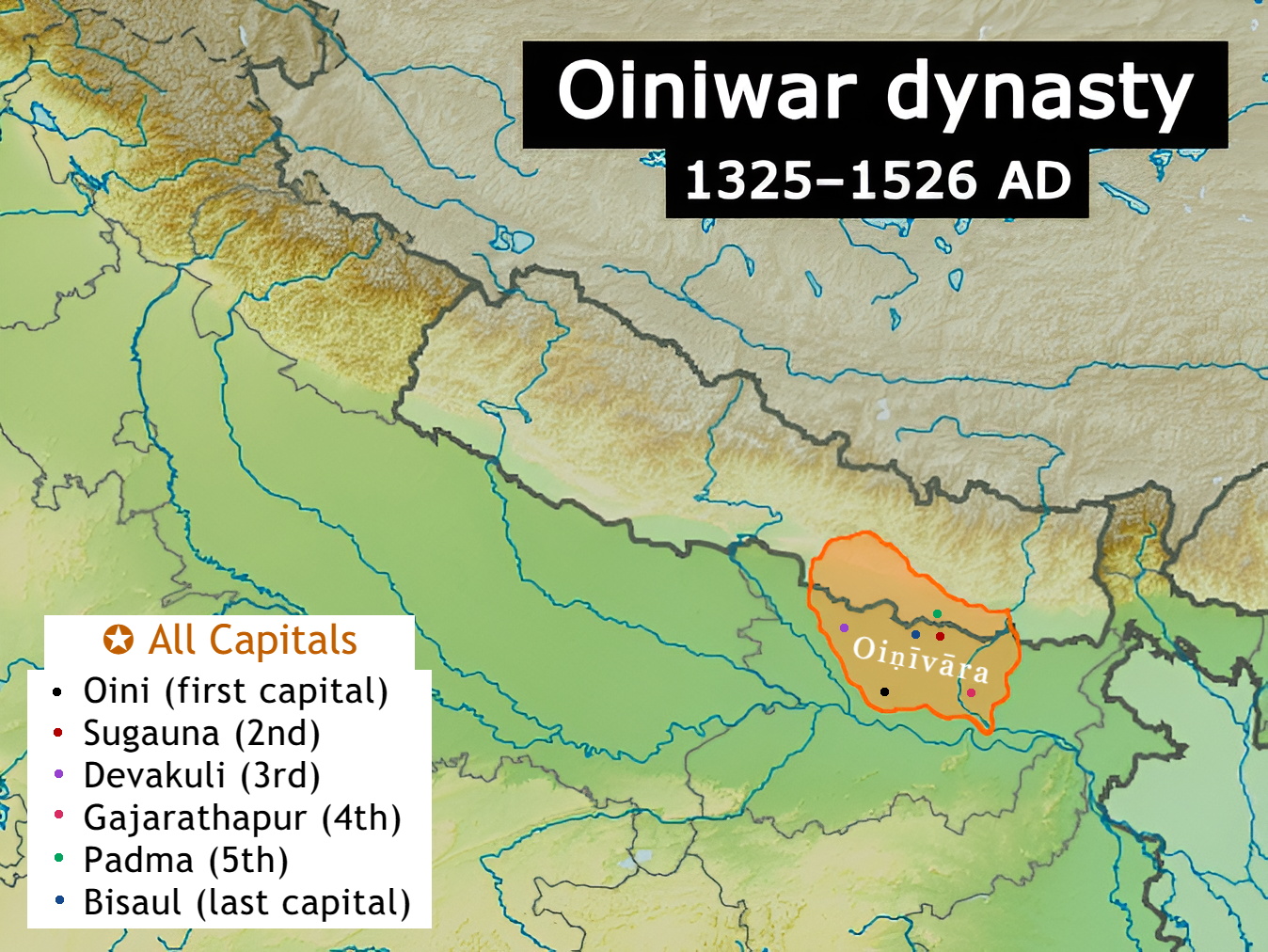
Map of the Oiṇīvāra dynasty in Mithila.

After ascending the throne of the Tirhut Sarkar, the King Kameshwar Thakur established his capital at his home village Oini. He became the monarch and established the Oiniwar Dynasty in Mithila. Later, the capital of the Oiniwar Dynasty was transferred to the Sugauna village and there after the dynasty was also known as Sugauna dynasty. In this dynasty, the ruler Shivasimha was a very popular king of the Tirhut Sarkar. He was contemporary to the Maithil poet Vidyapati. He declared the Kingdom of Tirhut Sarkar as an independent state in the subcontinent. He also released gold coins in the Mithila region to declare his kingdom as an independent and sovereign state.

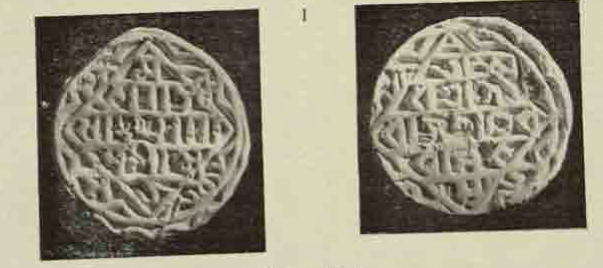
Image of the Silver coin issued by the King Bhairavasimha.

Similarly, the King Bhairavasimha in the dynasty, also declared his kingdom as an independent and sovereign state. He released Silver coins to declare sovereignty of his kingdom.

=== Annexation by Mughal Empire ===
After the fall of the Karnat Dynasty, the region of the Tirhut Sarkar was annexed by the Mughal Empire in the subcontinent. The Mughal emperor appointed Chaudhary as a care taker of the entire region of the Tirhut Sarkar for revenue collections and the administration of the region. During the reign of the ruler Gangadeva, the post of Chaudhary was introduced in the parganas. But after the annexation of the Tirhut Sarkar by Mughal Empire, the care taker of the entire region was also called as Chaudhary, who held all the parganas.

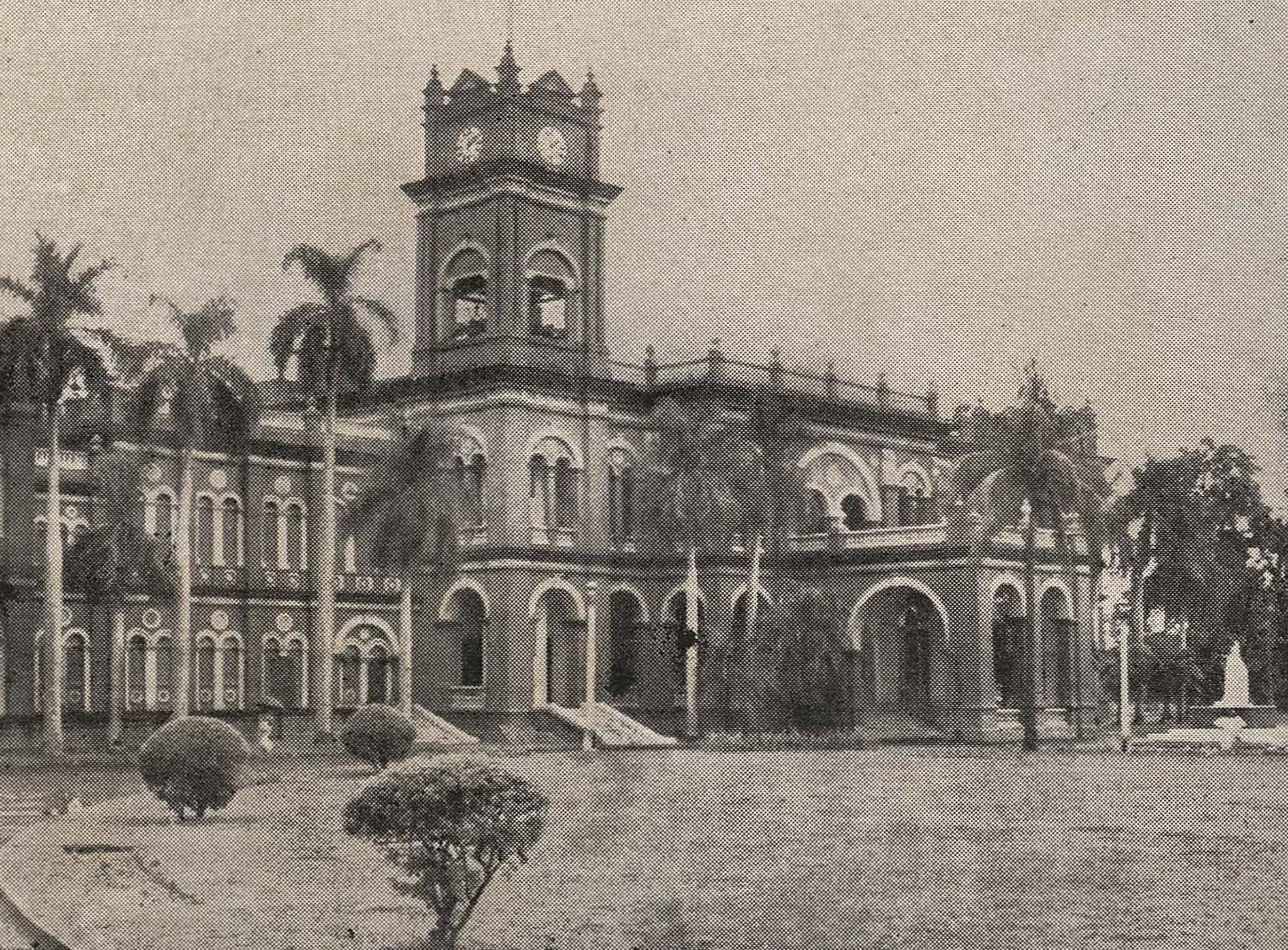
Palace of the Raj Darbhanga

=== Khandawala Dynasty (Raj Darbhanga) ===
In the Mughal documents, the care taker of the Tirhut Sarkar is generally mentioned as Chaudhary but the texts of local literature and the colonial British documents have mentioned them as a king generally denoted by the honorific title Maharajadhiraaja, Maharaja or Raja.

The history of the Khandawala Dynasty in the Tirhut Sarkar is traced since the period of the Maithil Brahmin scholars Raghunandan Dasa and his Guru Mahesh Thakur contemporary to the Mughal emperor Akbar. According to the historical documents, initially Raghunandan Dasa was gifted the post of Chaudhary by the Mughal emperor Akbar, but Raghunandan Dasa later gifted the post of Chaudhary to his Guru Mahesh Thakur in Gurudakshina. Then Mahesh Thakur was appointed the Chaudhary of the Tirhut Sarkar. On the occasion of Rama Navami, he ascended the throne and established himself as the ruler of the Tirhut Sarkar. Later, he became monarch and established the Khandawala Dynasty. This dynasty ruled the Tirhut Sarkar till the Independence of India.

In this dynasty, the King Hemangada Thakura was a popular ruler who is known for composing an astronomical text called Grahan Mala and popularising the folk festival Chaurchan in his kingdom. He declared this festival as the Lokaparva of Mithila.

=== East India Company ===
In 1765, the Subah of Bihar came under the control of the East India Company, after the grant of the Diwani rights. During that time, the region of North Bihar was divided into four Sarkars. They were Tirhut Sarkar, Champaran Sarkar, Hajipur Sarkar and Sharan Sarkar. Among these four Sarkars, the Tirhut Sarkar was the largest Sarkar having area 5,053 square miles.

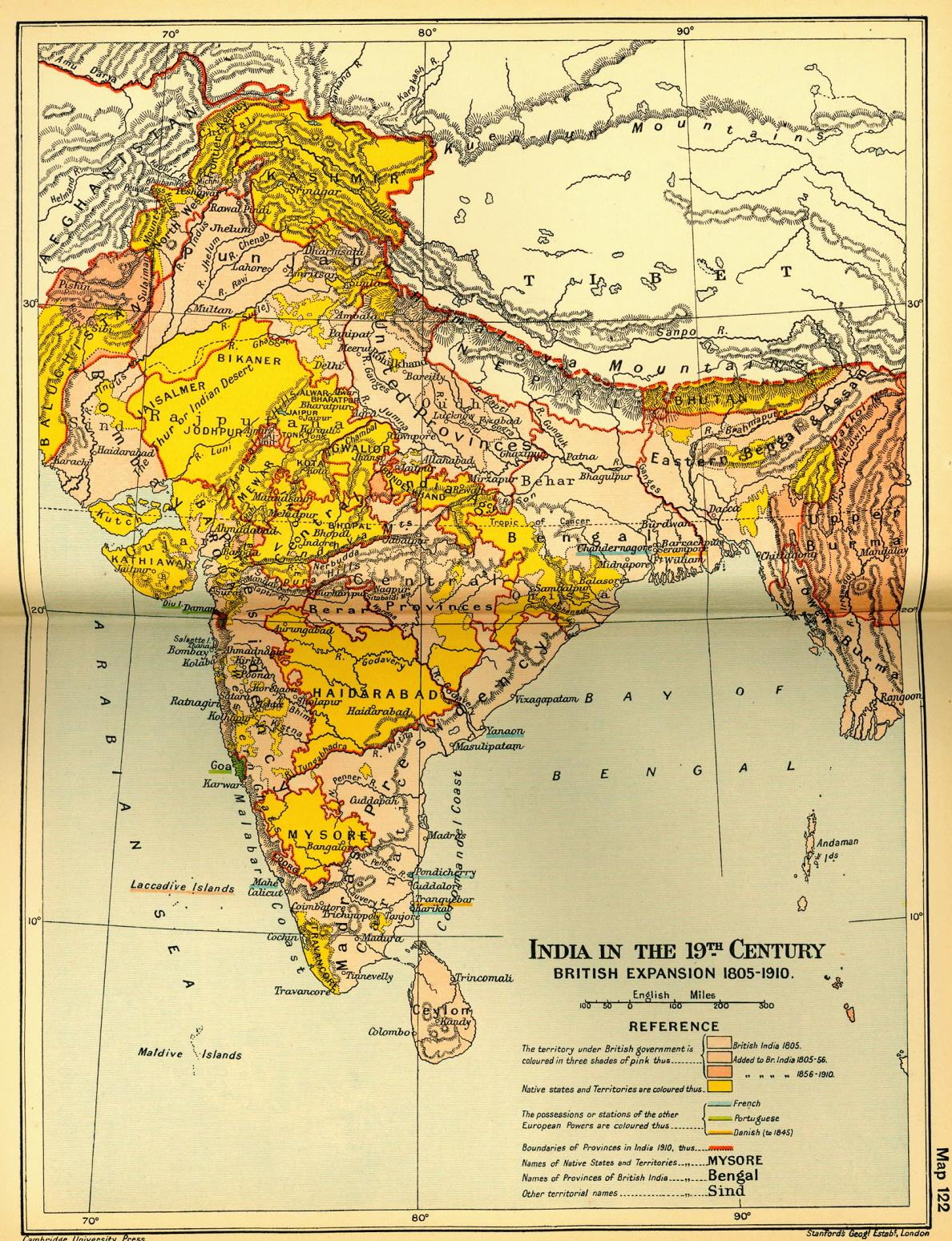
A map of the Indian subcontinent showing British Expansion between 1805 and 1910.

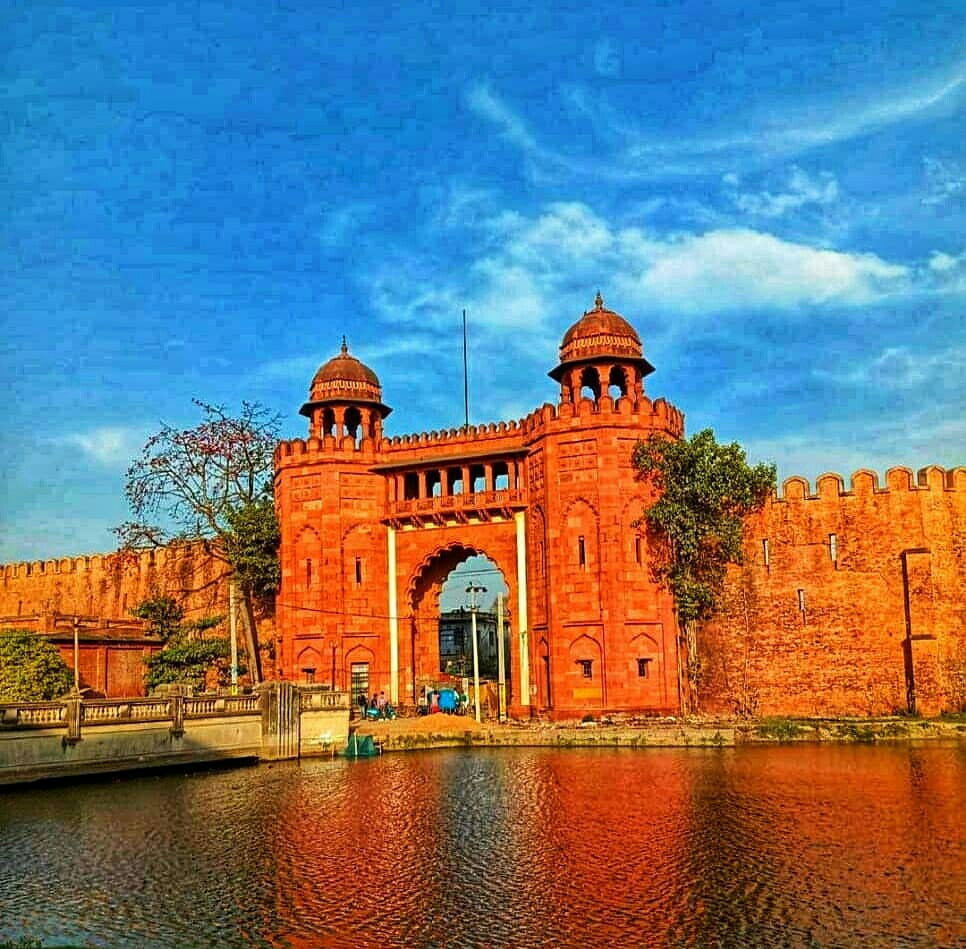
Fort of the Raj Darbhanga

During the period of the British Raj in the Indian subcontinent, the Tirhut Sarkar was also called as Raj Darbhanga, Tirhut State, or Darbhanga State. Around early 19th century, the ruler of the Raj Darbhanga claimed the absolute ownership (malikana) of the entire region of the Tirhut Sarkar as confirmed to the founder King Mahesh Thakur by the Mughal emperor Akbar. In the year 1807, the British Government conceded the claim of the Raj Darbhanga and granted the absolute ownership.

=== Court of Wards ===
In 1860, after the death of the Maharaja Maheshwar Singh of the Raj Darbhanga, the British Raj of the British Empire implemented the rule of the Court of Wards in the Tirhut Sarkar till the adulthood of the next heir of the estate. The Court of Wards was a mode of administration in the Sarkar till the adulthood of the next heir.

== Infrastructures development ==
During the period of Raj Darbhanga, the state established its own railway company called Tirhut State Railway in the region. The Tirhut Railway was started in the year 1874 by the Maharaja Lakshmishwar Singh of the Darbhanga Raj Dynasty alias Khandawala Dynasty.

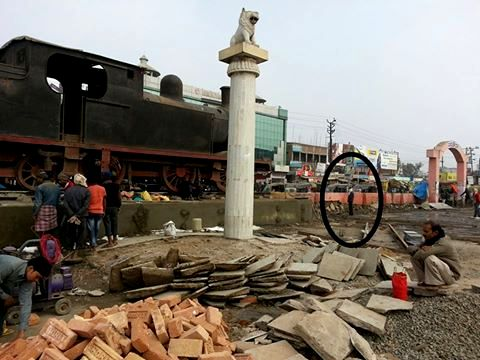
Remaining of the 100 Year old Coal Locomotive of the Tirhut Railway.

It was inaugurated on 17 April 1874. The first train of the Tirhut State Railway was operated between Wajitpur and Darbhanga.

== Legacy ==
The legacy of the Tirhut Sarkar is recorded in several mediaeval era texts, Tirhut scripts, remains of the Tirhut State Railway, and Tirhut style temples, etc.

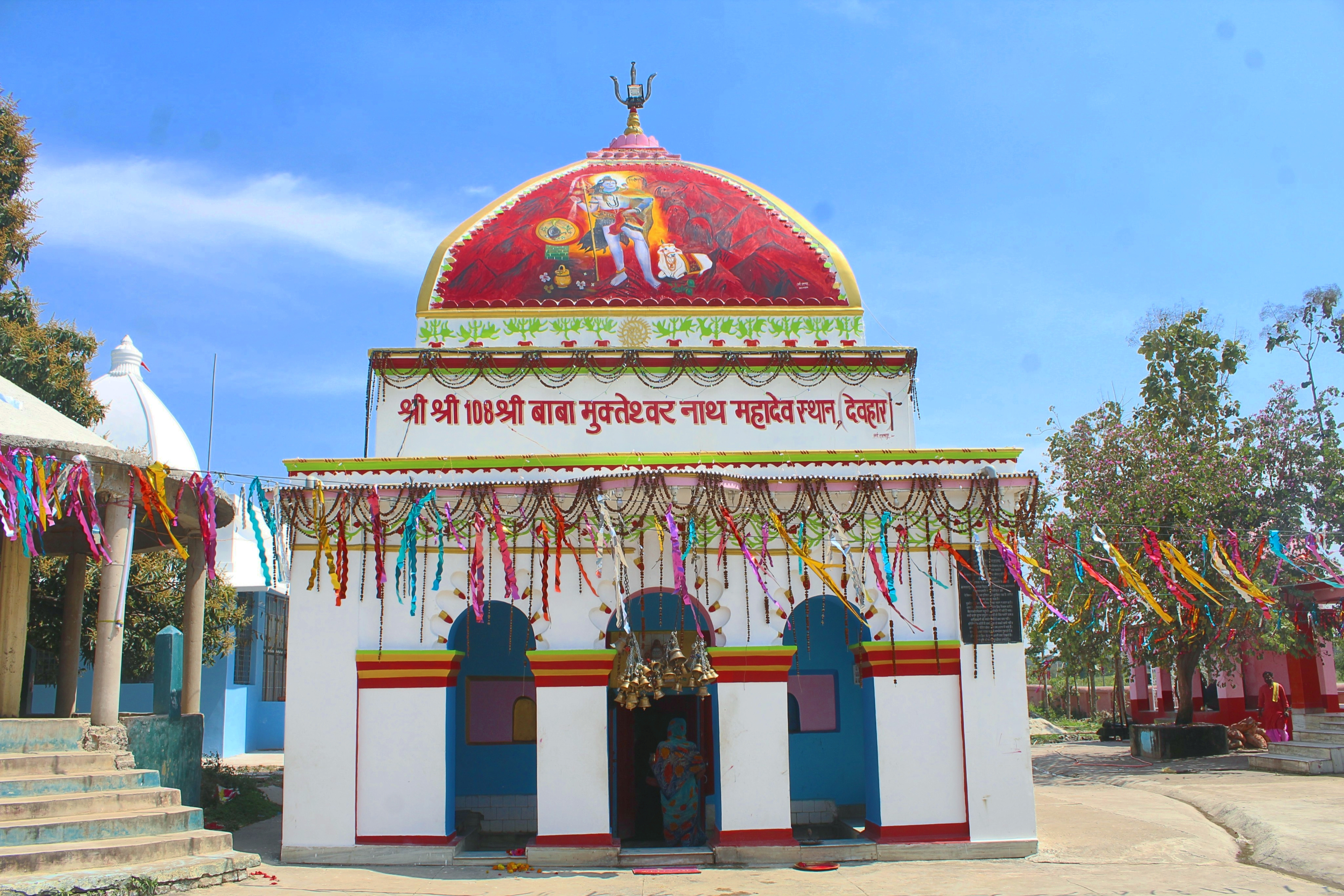
Tirhut style temple of the Baba Mukteshwar Nath Mahadev Mandir.

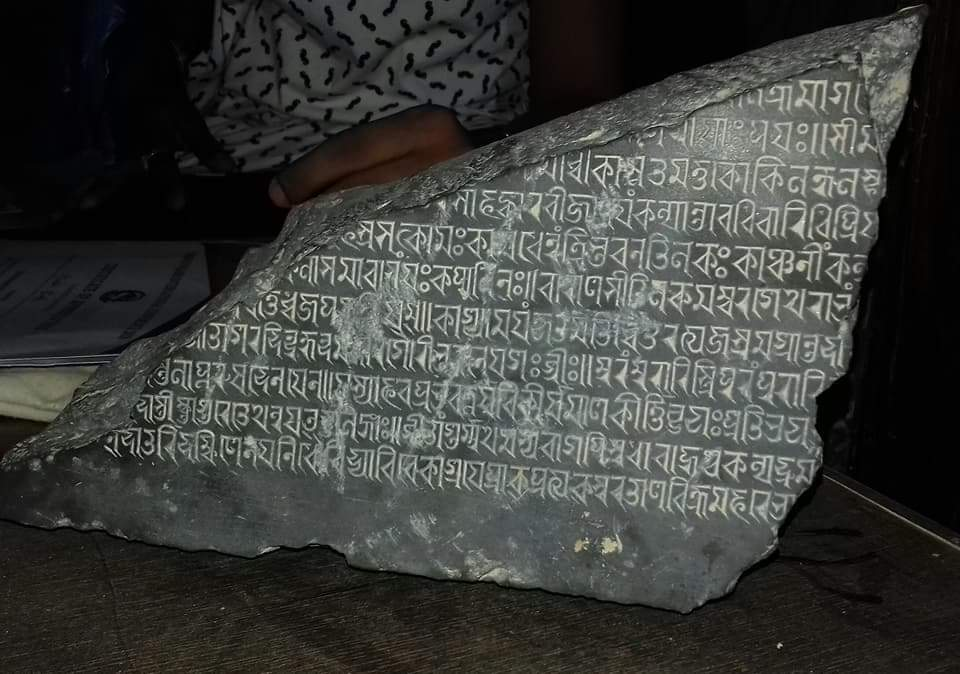
The 12th century Stone Inscription in Tirhuta script found in Simroungarh. (Karnat Dynasty inscription)

== See also ==
- Tirhuta scripts
- Tirhut State Railway
- Tirhut style of temples
