= Moolgram =

Geneological identity in Mithila

Moolgram (Maithili: मूलग्राम) (also written as Mulgram) is a branch or sub-division of a Mool among Maithil Brahmins in the Mithila region of the Indian subcontinent. It represents a more recent ancestral abode, indicating where a specific branch of the original Mool settled. The concept of "Moolgram" within the intricate social fabric of the Maithil Brahmin community is a testament to the enduring significance of lineage and ancestral settlement. It represents far more than a mere geographical marker; it embodies a living connection to the past, a thread that weaves together generations and shapes the present. It is one of the fundamental genealogical identity recorded in the Panji system of Mithila.

The record of the moolgrams of the Maithil Brahmins started by the order of the last King Harisimhadeva in the Karnat dynasty of Mithila. It was started in the 14th century CE.

== Description ==
In moolgram, the names of two villages are written together. The first village means that the earliest known person called as Viji Purush of the said family was a resident of that village and the second village means that the immediate ancestor of the concerned family lived in that other village at the time of registration. The first village in the moolgram refers to the name of the mool of that family. For example Anariye is a mool that means the Viji Purush of this mool was the resident of Anariye. Later the descendants of the Viji Purush settled in three villages Nehra, Laguniya and Pirapur. Further, the descendants of these three villages spread over several villages in the Mithila region. At the time of the Panji registration, these three villages were recorded as moolgrams. The descendants who migrated from Pirapur, recorded their moolgram as Anariye Pirapur. Similarly the descendants migrated from Nehra, recorded their moolgram as Anariye Nehra.

The moolgram is exogamous and plays an important role in the marriage of the Maithil Brahmins community.
