= Balanak Bonihar O Pallavi =

1994 short story collection by Binod Bihari Verma

- First Edition
- Author: Binod Bihari Verma
- Cover artist: Varuna Verma
- Language: Maithili
- Genre: Short story collection
- Publisher: Binod Bihari Verma
- Publication date: 1994
- Publication place: India
- Media type: Print (paperback)
- Pages: 105 pp
- ISBN: 81-905911-1-8
- OCLC: 33161229
- Preceded by: Maithili Karna Kayasthak Panjik Sarvekshan a Survey of the Panjis of the Karan Kayasthas of Mithila
- Followed by: Tapasa vai Ganga Biography of renowned historian Prof. Radha Krishna Choudhary.(1995)

Balanak Bonihar O Pallavi (The peasants on the banks of river Balan and Pallavi) is a short story collection, written by Dr Binod Bihari Verma, on the village life of Mithila on the banks of the Kosi River and its tributaries.

== Overview ==
This short story collection has fourteen short stories centering on the village society of Mithila. The focus of the stories and the protagonists are from the middle and lower middle class of the population. It deals with their social interactions, their dreams and aspirations, and their interaction with the predominant forces of their environment namely, the rivers.

=== Explanation of the Book's title ===
Balanak Bonihar O Pallavi means the tiller by the river and Pallavi, a common feminine name neing a metaphor for the agricultural produce of the farmer. It is the title of the first short story in this collection and is reflective of the general theme of the stories.

== Critical reception ==
- Various. Encyclopedia of Indian Literature. Vol.5. Sahitya Akademi, New Delhi. p. 4053. has the following review:
  His stories focus on human values and are full of tenderness and pathos.

== Characters ==
Most of the short stories have certain similar central characters, these are:

- Balan: The "river" or the flood waters
- Sounse: Gangetic river dolphin, Platenista gangetica, which populates Kosi and its tributaries, now a species on verge of extinction
- Oxygen, Hydrogen: Representing the chemicals
- Various human characters having different names although representing similar socioeconomic strata:
  - Rannu Sardar
  - Sulochana
  - Saheb
  - Gonour babu
- Real life characters:
  - Prof Upendra Thakur
  - Prof Radha Krishna Choudhary

== Major themes ==
- Life on the banks of rivers in Mithila
- Environmental pollution
- Lot of the women in Mithila
- Marital relationship in the rural poor
- The annual cycle of flooding and the devastation
- Unemployment
- Curse of the Dowry system in Mithila

== Allusions and references ==
- River: Kosi River
- People:
  - Prof Upendra Thakur
  - Prof Radha Krishna Choudhary

== Stories ==
1. Balanak bonihar o pallavi
2. Kunti karna o parshuram
3. Sulochnak chatisar
4. Saheb
5. Brahma - bisun - rati
6. Ham pan khelonhh
7. Fulak katha
8. Antarmukhi vasundhara
9. Kasha k ful
10. Machhak piknik
11. Jivan - nao
12. Ka purush
13. Gonour babu
14. Aakash ful
