= Anariye Pirapur =

Origin village of Sandilya Gotra in Maithil Brahmins

Anariye Pirapur is a mool grama (origin village) of one of the clans of Maithil Brahmins in Sandilya gotra. One clan of Maithil Brahmins were originated from this village. Harinatha is the first person of the village recorded in the written history. His son was Acyuta. Acyuta's daughter was married with Maharaja Rudranarayan. Acyuta was also the son-in-law of Sankara of Jalaya mool. It was recorded by the Panjikar Paṇḍita Modanānda in the folio 138. Anariye is also sometimes written as Allāri and Anāri.

The Veda of Shandilya gotra is Samaveda, therefore the village was a Samaveda pradhan (majority following Samaveda) village. It is one of the origin villages of Chhandogas.

== Anariye mool ==
Anariye is a mool of the Shandilya gotra in Mithila. Its original pronunciation is Allāri but its proverbial pronunciation Alariye or Anhariye or Anariye is generally used in the region. It is one of the 43 mools of the Shandilya gotra in the region. In the tradition of Maithil Brahmins, the term mool is defined as the village of the Vijipurusha translates to the earliest known ancestor or founder of the clan. It is an important and a fundamental geneological parameter recorded in the Panji system of Mithila.

=== Location ===
According to the historical document Swami Sahajananda Saraswati Rachanaavali, the location of the Anariye mool is mentioned as Saraisa pargana of Darbhanga district(in earlier period). In the earlier period, the regions of the present Samastipur district and Vaishali district were known as Saraisa pargana.

Among Maithil Brahmins, the mool of Anariye is further divided into three moolgrams. They are Nehra, Laguniya and Pirapur.
