= Maithili Karna Kayasthak Panjik Sarvekshan =

Maithil Karna Kayasthak Panjik Sarvekshan
- Maithili Karna Kayasthak Panjik Sarvekshan
- Author: Binod Bihari Verma
- Original title: A Survey Of The Panji Of The Karna Kayasthas Of Mithila
- Cover artist: Smt Yogmaya Devi
- Language: Maithili
- Genre: Genealogy, research
- Publisher: Binod Bihari Verma
- Publication date: 1973
- Publication place: India
- Media type: Print (Hardbound)
- Pages: 212
- ISBN: 978-81-905911-0-2
- OCLC: 20044508
- LC Class: DS432.K29 V37 1973
- Followed by: Balanak Bonihar O Pallavi (1994)

Maithil Karna Kayasthak Panjik Sarvekshan (A Survey of the Panji of the Karna Kayasthas of Mithila) is a book written by Binod Bihari Verma in Maithili. It is a research study of the available ancient manuscripts in the Mithila region, called Panjis, which are genealogical charts of Maithil Brahmin and Maithil Karna Kayasthas castes. This study focuses on the manuscripts related to the Karna Kayasthas of Mithila.

== Overview ==
The work is based on several manuscripts of Panjis that were obtained from various panjikars in Darbhanga, Bihar. The Panjis concerned deal with the genealogy of the Karna Kayasthas. The manuscript is written in Tirhuta script (Maithili script) on palm leaves and old paper called Basaha made out of indigenous material. The work deals with Mulgrams (transl. "original village homes") and the transmigration of the Karna Kayasthas to subsequent places of living. The book is important for the geographical and social study of North Bihar of the concerned period. The work also deals with personalities of eminence among the Karna Kayasthas since the 12th century.

== Chapters ==
The book contains following chapters:

1. Pustak parichay evam lekhak parichay(Introduction to the book and its writer)
2. Prakkathhan(Foreword)
  1. Nivedan O srot pandulipi (Introduction and the sources of the manuscript)
  2. Panjik purv aitehaasik prishthbhumi(Historical background before the usage of Panjis)
  3. Karan', 'karnik' o 'kayasth (Introduction to the terminologies of 'Karan', 'Karnik' and 'Kayasth')
  4. Upadhik spashtikaran (Explanatory notes on the surnames)
3. Panji prakaran (A perspective of Panjis)
  1. Panjik uddeshya tatha pratifal (Usage of Panjis and their significance)
  2. Panjik parampara (Tradition of Panjis)
  3. Panjik adhyayan evam lekhan vidhi (Study of Panjis and the methodology of transcribing them)
  4. Panjikarak parampara (Traditions of Panjis writers)
  5. Panjik kaal (Age of panjis)
  6. Maithil brahminak panji sa tulna (Comparison with Panjis of Maithil Brahmins)
4. Prathamagaman o prasthan (Initial arrivals and departures)
  1. Purvabhas(Concept)
  2. Mul gram (Original residences or villages in the migration)
  3. Dera o baas sthaan (Subsequent residences or dwellings in the migration)
  4. Mulgram o deraak aitehaasikta (Historical importance of the Mulgram and Dera)
  5. Derak parichit sthaan (Identification of the deras)
5. Patra parichay (Introduction to protagonists)
  1. Vyaktitiva o purush (Personalities and persons)
  2. Biji purushak pashchaat vanshavali (Genealogical charts of the seed persons)
  3. Vibhinn mul gramak panjik aarambhik purush gan (Panjis of the original people of various mul grams)
  4. Kichu biji purush sa adyaparyant vanshaavali (Genealogical charts of certain seed persons)
6. Prakkathan (Afterword)

== Release details ==
- Verma, Binod Bihari (1973). Maithili Karna Kayasthak Panjik Sarvekshan. Madhepura: Binod Bihari Verma. p. 212. OCLC 20044508.
- Contains 2 black-and-white plates of the Panjis manuscripts.

== See also ==
- Darbhanga
- Mithila
- Paag
