= Saurath Sabha =

Village in Bihar, India

Coordinates: 26°23′37″N 86°02′29″E

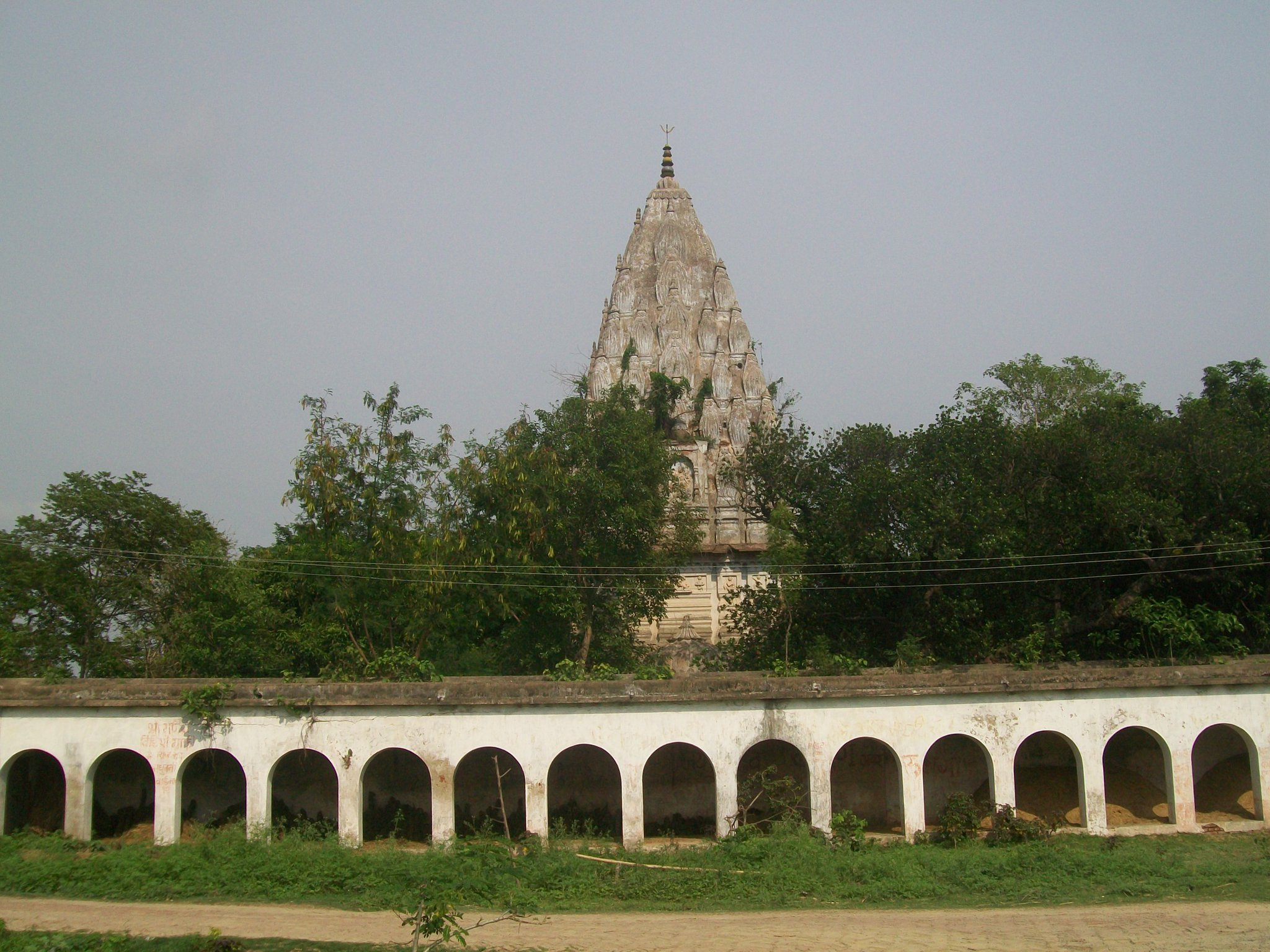
Madhaweshwar Nath Mahadev Mandir at the campus of Saurath Sabha

Saurath Sabha is a historical village situated approximately 6 km northeast of Madhubani in the Madhubani district of Bihar, India. It is famous for its several centuries old tradition of annual gathering of thousands of Maithil Brahman to match couples during the Hindu months of Jyestha-Aasadh. The gathering is organised in an orchard covering 22 acres (bighas) of land, which are said to have been donated by the Maharaja of Darbhanga. It is an important social event in India that is focused on arranged marriages between Maithil men and women according to a reading of their lineage history by the registrars (Panjikars). The significance of the tradition has been gradually fallen down in the modern era but it is still alive ceremonially. In the year 2025, it was inngrauted on 28 May by the Sadar SDO Chandan Jha of Madhubani city.

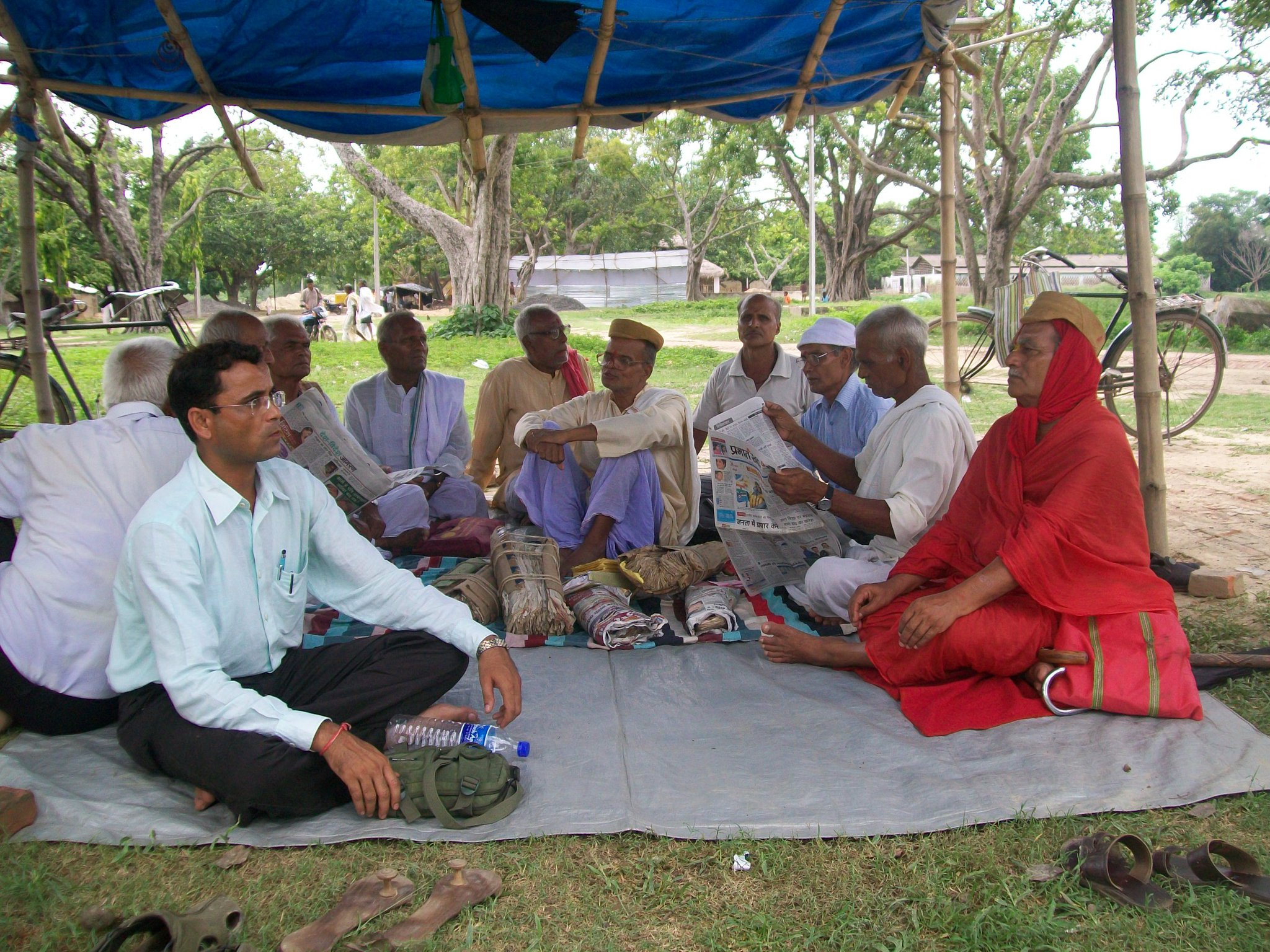
View of Saurath Sabh

== History ==
The original name of the village is Saurashtra. The name derives from its status as a cultural and intellectual centre of the Saurashtra region, associated with Janaka, the ancient king of Mithila. Janaka is mentioned in the Ramayana stories as the father of the Maithili Princess Sita. Tradition has it that the marriage of Janaka's daughter, Sita, took place in this village.

The presiding God of this village is Somanath or Shiva. According to tradition, in AD 1025, Mahmud of Ghazni attacked the temple of Somnath, completely destroying it. It is believed that Lord Somnath appeared in the dream of the two Maithil Brahman brothers, Bhagirath Dutta Sharma and Ganga Dutt Sharma, and asked them to take His lingam away. The two brothers, following God's instruction, went to Dwarka, brought the lingam to the village and kept it there in hiding for a long time. Later the lingam was duly enshrined. The Somanath temple at Dwarka is situated in the Saurashtra region. In the 18th century, a Maithil king constructed here the temple of Somnath. This story is mentioned in the introductory chapter of the official District Gazetteer of Darbhanga (1964, when Madhubani district was part of Darbhanga) by Roy Choudhary.

The main landowners of the village are the Thakurs family. The Thakurs are Maithil Brahmins who owned most of the land in the village and held the official marriage records, as well as records of family trees. Later in the 17th century, when the house of Thakurs was set on fire by outsiders, they transferred the records of families to other Shishyas, who now look after the marriage registration and are known as Panjipara.

In the 18th century, a deputy commissioner stole 300 acres of land from the Thakurs, after taking fingerprints from Ravinath Tagore after his death. His son, Laxminarayan Thakur, established the Laxminarayan Palace, which is situated near the Mahatma Taposhtal and Gayatri Mandir. The Gayatri Mandir was established by Laxminarayan's younger brother, Purushottam Thakur, who was referred to as Mahatma. Today the Thakurs live in Nepal, Bangladesh, and various other parts of India.

== Saurath Sabha or Sabha Gachi ==
The King of Mithila, Harisingh Deva (1310–1324), introduced the practice of keeping genealogical records (Panji) in the Mithila region. This practice was carried out by the Brahmins and Kayasthas. This was considered a major social reform at the time and was reinforced through royal patronage.

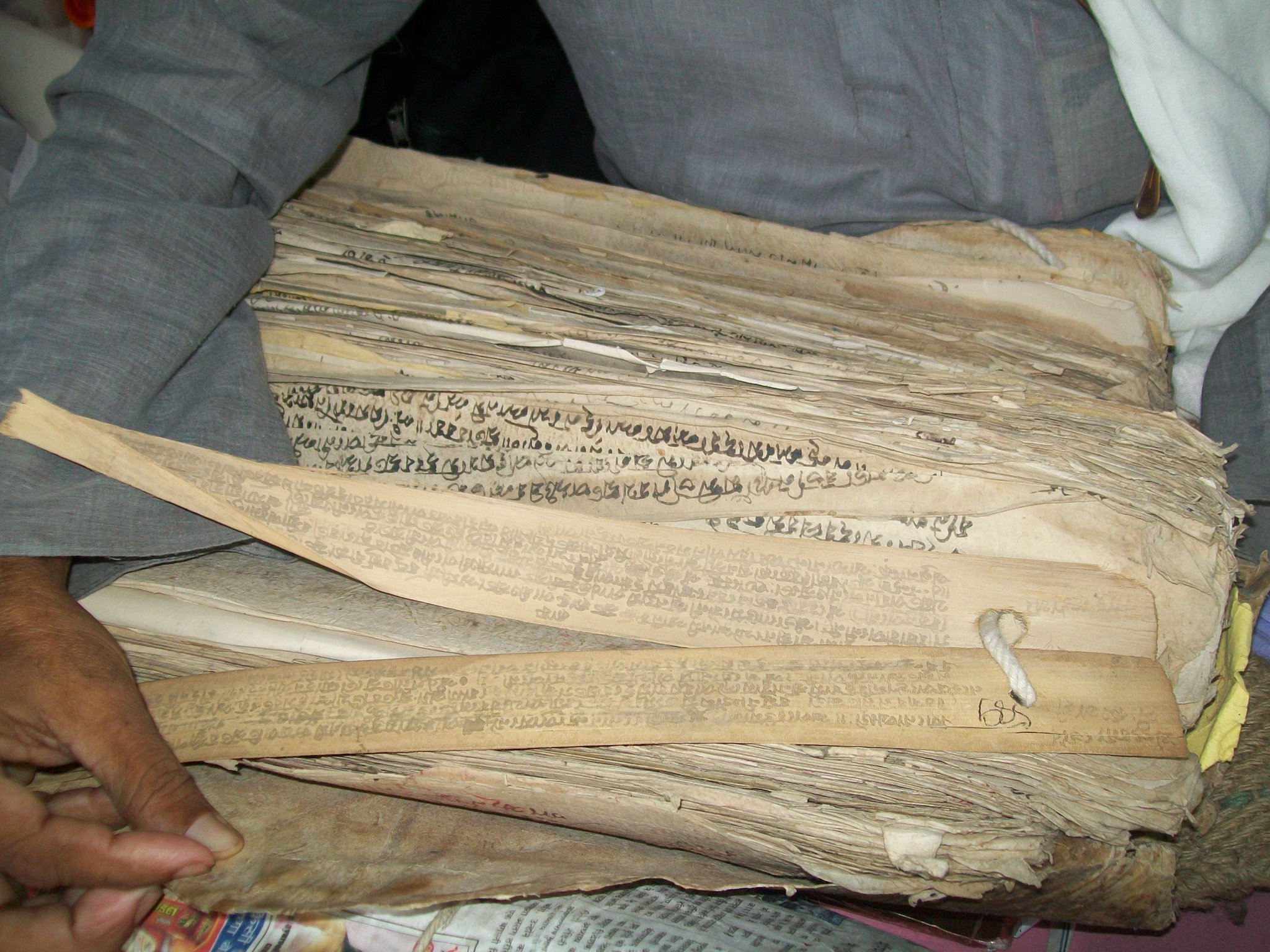
Panji genealogical records kept by Panjikars in Mithila

It was proposed that to facilitate marriages and curb practices associated with arranged marriages, the father of the bride should be allowed to meet the father and prospective groom so that the marriage could be arranged in front of everyone. The Maharaja of Mithila approved this idea and 14 villages were selected to hold these events, known as sabhas: Saurath, Khanagadi, Partapur, Sheohar, Govindpur, Fattepur, Sajhaul, Sukhasana, Akhdari, Hemnagar, Balua, Baruali, Samsaul, and Sasaula. While Saurath and Sasaula maintain the tradition, all other villages have discontinued this practice.

== Tradition of Saurath Sabha ==
Almost every year, during the suddha - favourable days for the arrangement of marriages - thousands of Maithil Brahmins gather at Sabha Gaachchi in Saurath. The Panjikaran, who the Panji genealogical records, plays an important role in arranging marriages; it is compulsory for every individual seeking marriage to receive an asvajajanapatra certificate from the Panjikaran, stating that there is no "blood relationship" between the bride and groom. There is a fixed place – dera – for every village in the Sabha. The timing and number of days are decided during a meeting between the scholars and pandits of Mithila in accordance with the traditional astrological almanac, Pachanga.

The Sabha usually lasts for seven to fifteen days and is held once or twice a year during the most favourable months. After reaching the dera the father or guardian of the bride begins searching for a suitable groom with the help of his relatives and a ghatak (middleman). The negotiation takes place in a democratic manner and is held in the open. The grooms and their parents also arrive at their respective deras. Historically, the Saurath Sabha was regarded as a ‘groom market’. However, women are not allowed in the Saurath Sabha.

== See also ==
- Mithila (region)
- Arranged marriage in India
- Marriage in Hinduism
- Panjis
- Traditions of India
- Mithila Lalit Sangrahalaya
