= Gajendra Thakur =

Indian author (born 1971)

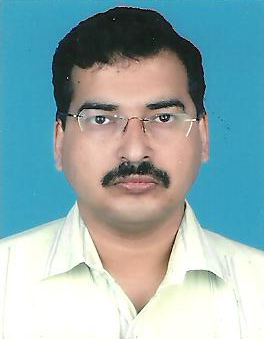
- Gajendra Thakur at Madhubani, India
- Born: 30 March 1971; Bhagalpur, Bihar, India
- Occupation: Writer · Historian · Educationist
- Writing career
- Period: 20th–21st century
- Genres: Literary critic, historian · Novelist, Dramatist, Poet · Lexicographer
- Notable works: Sahasrabadhani; Sahasrashirsha; Shabdashastram; Sahasrabdik Chaupar Par; Genome Mapping- 450 AD to 2009 AD- Mithilak Panji Prabandh; Videha-(Edited) 127 volumes

Gajendra Thakur (born 1971) is an Indian author. He writes in the Maithili language, a language spoken in Northern Bihar (of India) and South-Eastern Nepal. He is an author, lexicographer, historian (of Mithila- ancient Videha and of Maithili); and palaeographer, he has deciphered ancient and medieval palm leaf inscriptions in Tirhuta script of Maithili Language (Mithilakshar script). These panjis are genealogical records of Maithil Brahmin community of Mithila region and contain details of around 100 inter-caste marriages. Besides it provides written historical records of people and personalities, hitherto considered mythical ones. Besides he deciphered scripts inscribed on temples/ dilapidated buildings throughout the length and breadth of Mithila.

He has also compiled an English-Maithili Computer dictionary. He has helped in preparing Unicode application for Mithilakshar (Tirhuta) script. His English-Maithili Dictionary is only such dictionary.

He has also contributed in social development work.

== Literary activity ==
He wrote KuruKshetram Antarmanak, a work in Maithili Language -in seven volumes (Vol.I- Literary Criticism, Vol. II- a Novel- Sahasrabadhani- translated into English by the name The Comet, Vol.III Poetry collection- Sahasrabdik Chaupar Par, Vol.IV- Short Story Collection- Galp Guchh, Vol.V- Play- Sankarshan, Vol.VI- two long epic-verses (geet prabandh) Tvanchahanch and Asanjati Man, Vol-VII- Children's literature- grown-ups literature- Balmandali-Kishor Jagat). Thereafter his transcribed 11000 palm-leaf inscriptions were published in a single volume with an explanatory introduction as “Genome Mapping −450 AD to 2009 AD- Mithilak Panji Prabandh”; later its sequel "Geneological Mapping-450 AD to 2009 AD- Mithilak Panji Prabandh vol.II" was released. He also compiled "Maithili-English Dictionary" and "English Maithili Dictionary". The English-Maithili Dictionary was particularly notable as it included computer terminology, so far unavailable in any other dictionary.

He is editor of Videha, a fortnightly Maithili e-journal.

Traditional Mithilakshar, i.e., Tirhuta Script of Maithili language: He was pioneer in standardisation of Mithilakshar script. The Unicode encoding applicant (now the ISO has approved encoding of Tirhuta as Unicode) has acknowledged his contribution. and has included in the references as well.

He has also translated from Maithili into English. He has translated poems and stories into Maithili from Kannada (Of Ashok Hegde), Telugu (of N. Aruna, Sheikh Muhammad Sharif, Annavaran Devender), Oriya (of Basudev Sunani, Bharat Majhi) and Gujarati (of Babu Suthar, Ajay Sarvaiyya, Rajendra Patel, Hemang Ashwin Kumar Desai) through English.

He is a member of Maithili Lekhak Sangh, the organisation of authors of Maithili.

== Major works ==
Edited Works

English-Maithili Dictionary

Maithili-English Dictionary

Genome Mapping- 450 AD to 2009 AD- Mithilak Panjis Prabandh: (11000 palm leaf manuscripts containing genealogical records)

Videha:sadeha:1 Devanagari

Videha:Sadeha:1: Tirhuta

Videha:Sadeha:2: Videha Prabandh-Nibandh-Samalochna

Videha:Sadeha:3: Videha Katha

Videha:Sadeha:4: Videha Padya

Videha:Sadeha:5: Videha Maithili Vihani katha (Videha Maithili Seed Stories)

Videha:Sadeha:6: Videha Maithili Laghu katha (Videha Maithili Short Stories)

Videha:Sadeha:7: Videha Maithili Padya (Videha Maithili Verse)

Videha:Sadeha:8: Videha Maithili Natya Utsav (Videha Maithili Stage and Drama)

Videha:Sadeha:9: Videha Maithili Shishu Utsav (Videha Maithili Children Literature)

Videha:Sadeha:10: Videha Maithili Prabandha-Nibandha-Samalochna (Videha Maithili Research Papers/Essays/Criticism)

Braille Maithili: (his novel Sahasrabadhani- Ist Maithili book in Braille).

222 issues of Videha Ist Maithili Fortnightly e Magazine- ISSN 2229-547X

Authored

KurukShetram Antarmanak- a seven volume work in Maithili Language:-

Work in Translation

His works are available in translation.

His works have been translated into English ( 1.Maithili Novel Sahasrabadhani as "The comet" and 2.Maithili collection of poems Sahasrabdik Chaupar Par as "On the Dice-board of the Millennium". The readers of English translations of Maithili Novel "sahasrabadhani" and verse collection "sahasrabdik chaupar par" has intimated that the English translation has not been able to grasp the nuances of original Maithili. Therefore, the Author has started translating his Maithili works in English himself. After these translations are complete these would be the official translations authorised by the Author of original work) and others (Some Maithili short-stories as "The Science of Words" by the author himself). His novel Sahasrabadhani has been translated into Konkani Language (by Seby Fernandes), Tulu language, Kannada (Pramila B.J. Alva), Sanskrit and Marathi Language. His short-story collection "Galp Guchchh" has been translated into Sanskrit. Some of his stories have been translated into Hindi by Subhash Chandra Yadav and Vinit Utpal.

Some of his recent works

Ulkamukh, play about the caste system ISBN 97893-80538-50-1 Prabandh-Nibandh-Samalochna vol.II, (a collection of research papers/ essays/ criticism ISBN 97893-80538-54-9); Dhangi Baat Banebaak Daam Agoobaar Pene Chan, (a collection of Maithili Ghazal/ Rubai/ Kata ISBN 97893-80538-51-8); Shabdshastram: (a collection of Maithili short-stories ISBN 97893-80538-52-5); Jalodip: (three Maithili Children Plays ISBN 97893-80538-50-1); Naarashanshi: (thought in verse ISBN 978-93-80538-58-7); Sahasrajit: (anthology of poems ISBN 978-93-80538-59-4); Aksharmushtika: (Children short stories ISBN 978-93-80538-60-0); Bangak Bangaura: (Children songs ISBN 978-93-80538-61-7); Genealogical Mapping:vol.II (transliteration/ decipherment of ancient age-old manuscripts ISBN 978-93-80538-62-4); Jagdish Prasad Mandal: Ekta Biography (Biography of Sh. Jagdish Prasad Mandal ISBN 978-93-80538-68-6).

== See also ==
- List of Indian writers
