= Sasaula Sabha Gachhi =

Historical Sabha of Maithil Brahmins

- ससौला सभा गाछी (Maithili)
- Location: Sasaula village, Suppi block, Sitamarhi district, Mithila region, Bihar

History
- Founded: King Harisimhadeva of Karnat Dynasty
- Built for: Public Marriage Assembly for Maithil Brahmins

Sasaula Sabha Gachhi (Maithili: ससौला सभा गाछी) is a historical place for the Maithil Brahmins in the Mithila region of India. It is located at Sasaula village of Suppi block in the Sitamarhi district of Bihar. In the early times, the parents of Maithil Brahmin brides came here to select suitable bridegrooms for their daughter. It is a famous marriage related public assembly in the tradition of the Maithil Brahmins.

== Description ==
The Sasaula Sabha Gachhi is one of the fourteen historical places of marriage sabha in the tradition of Maithil Brahmins. It serves as the location for one of major seats of Panjikars for the registration of Maithil Vivah through the Panji system among the Maithil Brahmins in the Mithila region. There is a temple in the campus of the Sabha Gachhi known as Shri Radhakrishna Ji Maharaj Mandir which is presently managed and protected by the Bihar State Religious Trust Board.

== History ==
The Sasaula Sabha Gachhi was established by the King Harisimhadeva of the Karnat Dynasty in the Mithila Kingdom.
