= Radha Krishna Choudhary =

Indian historian (1921–1985)

- Choudhary at Deoghar, Bihar, 1965
- Born: 15 February 1921; Bhagalpur, Bihar and Orissa Province, British India (present-day Kahara, Madhepura, Bihar)
- Died: 15 March 1985 (aged 64)
- Occupations: writer, historian, educationist
- Spouse: Shanti Devi
- Parent(s): Vidyawati Devi (mother); Raj Kishor Choudhary (father)
- Writing career
- Period: 20th century

Radha Krishna Choudhary (15 February 1921 – 15 March 1985) was an Indian historian, educationist, and writer. He contributed to the historical and archaeological studies of Bihar as well as to Maithili literature. He was a professor of history at Ganesh Dutt College, Begusarai, Bihar and published numerous original research papers on the history of Bihar and Mithila. He is best known for his book "History of Bihar" (1958), but his "Mithilak Itihas" (2010) is considered his greatest work.

== Early life and education ==
Radha Krishna Choudhary was born on 15 February 1921 in Bhagalpur, Bihar and Orissa Province, British India into a Maithil Karna Kayastha family. He was the son of Raj Kishor Choudhary, a lawyer and one of the founding members of Bihar Pradesh Congress Committee. His grandfather, Shyam Lal Choudhary was also a literary writer. Choudhary completed his schooling at Williams High School in Supaul. He completed his Intermediate of Arts and Bachelor of Arts in history at Tej Narayan Banaili College, Bhagalpur, and went on to earn a Master of Arts in history from Patna University.

== Career ==
After completing his master's degree from Patna University in 1945, he joined the university as a government research scholar. In 1946, Choudhary joined Ganesh Dutt College, Begusarai as a lecturer of history. After spending a year at the college, he established the Kashi Prasad Jaiswal Archaeological Museum aimed at preserving scattered archaeological remains of the Begusarai region. He also served as vice-principal and acting principal at the college for 22 years.

Choudhary also served as the principal of Shankar Sah Vikramshila Mahavidyalaya in Kahalgaon for three years. In March 1974, he started teaching in the Department of History at Bhagalpur University, where he remained active until his retirement in 1984.

== Research and contributions ==
Choudhary conducted research and fieldwork on inscriptions and coins from the Pala Empire and published his findings in the G. D. College Research Bulletin Series.

== Affiliations and recognition ==
Choudhary was elected to the Advisory Board for Maithili at the Sahitya Akademi.

== Death ==
He died suddenly of cardiac arrest on 15 March 1985.

== Major works ==
- Political History of Japan (1868–1947). Bihar Publishers, Patna. 1948. English.
- Maithili Sahityik Nibandhavali. Abhinav Granthagar, Patna. 1950. Maithili.
- Sidhharth. Abhinav Granthagar, Patna. 2 ed. 1952. Hindi.
- Studies in Ancient Indian Law. Motilal Banarsidas, Patna.1953. English.
- Bihar - The Homeland of Buddhism. Sidharth Press, Patna. 1956. English.
- History of Bihar. Motilal Banarsidas, Patna. 1958. English.
- Select Inscriptions of Bihar. Smt Shanti Devi. 1958. English.
- Mithilak Sankshipt Rajnaitik Itihas. Vaidehi Samiti, Darbhanga. 1961. Maithili.
- Vratyas in Ancient India. Choukhamba Prakashan, Varanasi. 1964. English.
- Prachin Bharat Ka Rajnaitik Evam Sanskritik Itihas (1200 Eisvi Tak). Bharati Bhavan Publishers, Patna. 1967. Hindi.
- Sharaantidha. Maithili Prakashan, Calcutta. 1968. Maithili.
- Vishva Itihas Ki Ruprekha (2 Volumes). Ajanta Press Patna. 1969. Hindi.
- History of Muslim Rule in Tirhut (1207 - 1765). Choukhamba Prakashan, Varanasi. 1970. English.
- Kautilya's Political Ideas and Institutions. Choukhamba Prakashan, Varanasi. 1971. English.
- Dhammapada - Maithili Translation. Maithii Prakashan Samiti, Calcutta. 1971. Maithili
- A Survey of Maithili Literature, Shruti Publications, Delhi, 2010, ISBN No.978-93-80538-36-5
- Mithilak Itihas, Shruti Publication, Delhi, 2010 (in Maithili Language), ISBN No.978-93-80538-28-0

== Biography ==
- Verma, Binod Bihari (1995). Tapasa vai Ganga. ISBN 978-81-905911-2-6.
