= Madhaweshwar Nath Mahadev Mandir =

- माधवेश्वर नाथ महादेव मंदिर
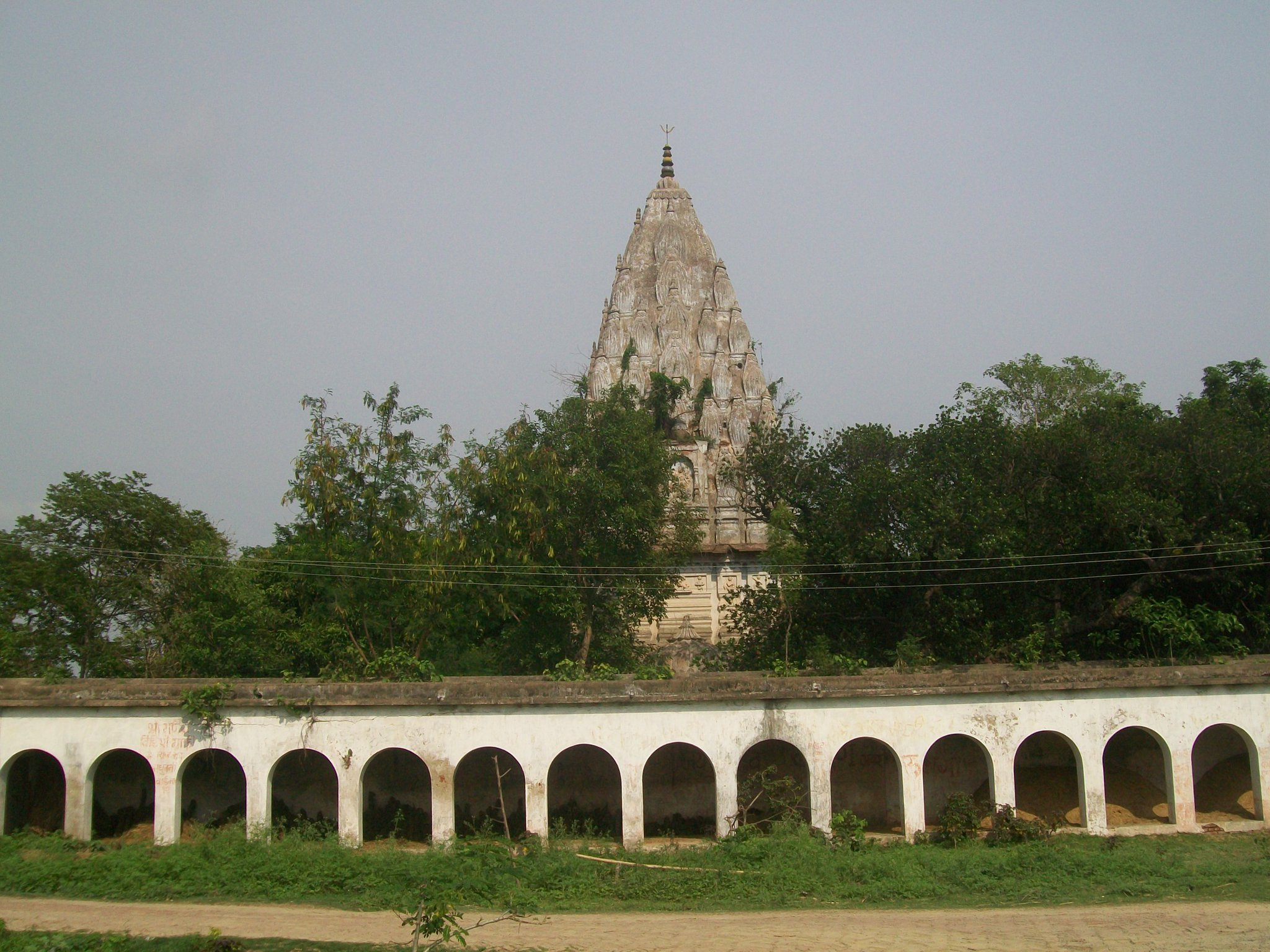
- View of Madhaweshwar Nath Mahadev Mandir from the campus of the Saurath Sabha

Religion
- Affiliation: Hinduism
- District: Madhubani district
- Deity: Lord Shiva

Location
- Location: Saurath Sabha, Madhubani
- State: Bihar
- Country: India

Architecture
- Founder: King Madhav Singh
- Inscriptions: Two parts of Kirtishila

Madhaweshwar Nath Mahadev Mandir is a historical Hindu temple of Lord Shiva located at the campus of Saurath Sabha near the outskirts of the city of Madhubani in the Mithila region of Bihar.

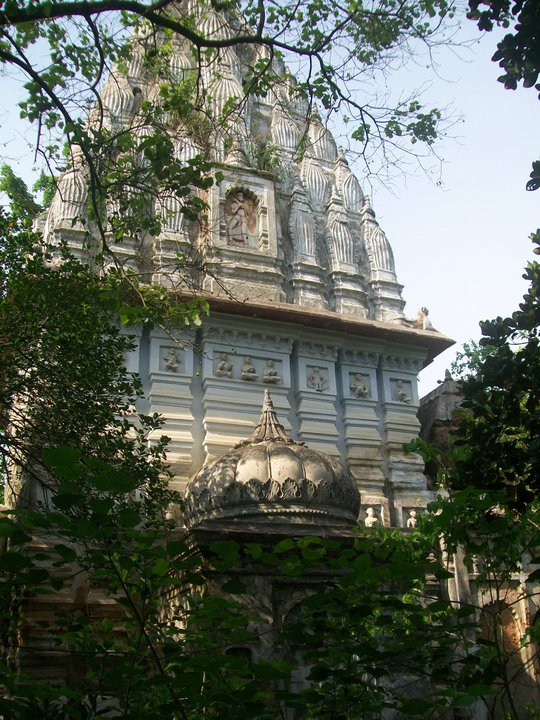
Madhaweshwar Nath Mahadev Mandir

== Description ==
Madhaweshwar Nath Mahadev Mandir is located at the campus of the world famous marriage assembly known as Saurath Sabha Gachi. The temple has a large green complex, with a building for the shelter of the devotees in the courtyard, a large pond nearby and a paved ghat. There is inscription called as Kirtishila on the wall of the temple which gives the record about the construction of temple and other amenities around the temple. The second part of the inscription Kirtishila is not clearly visible.

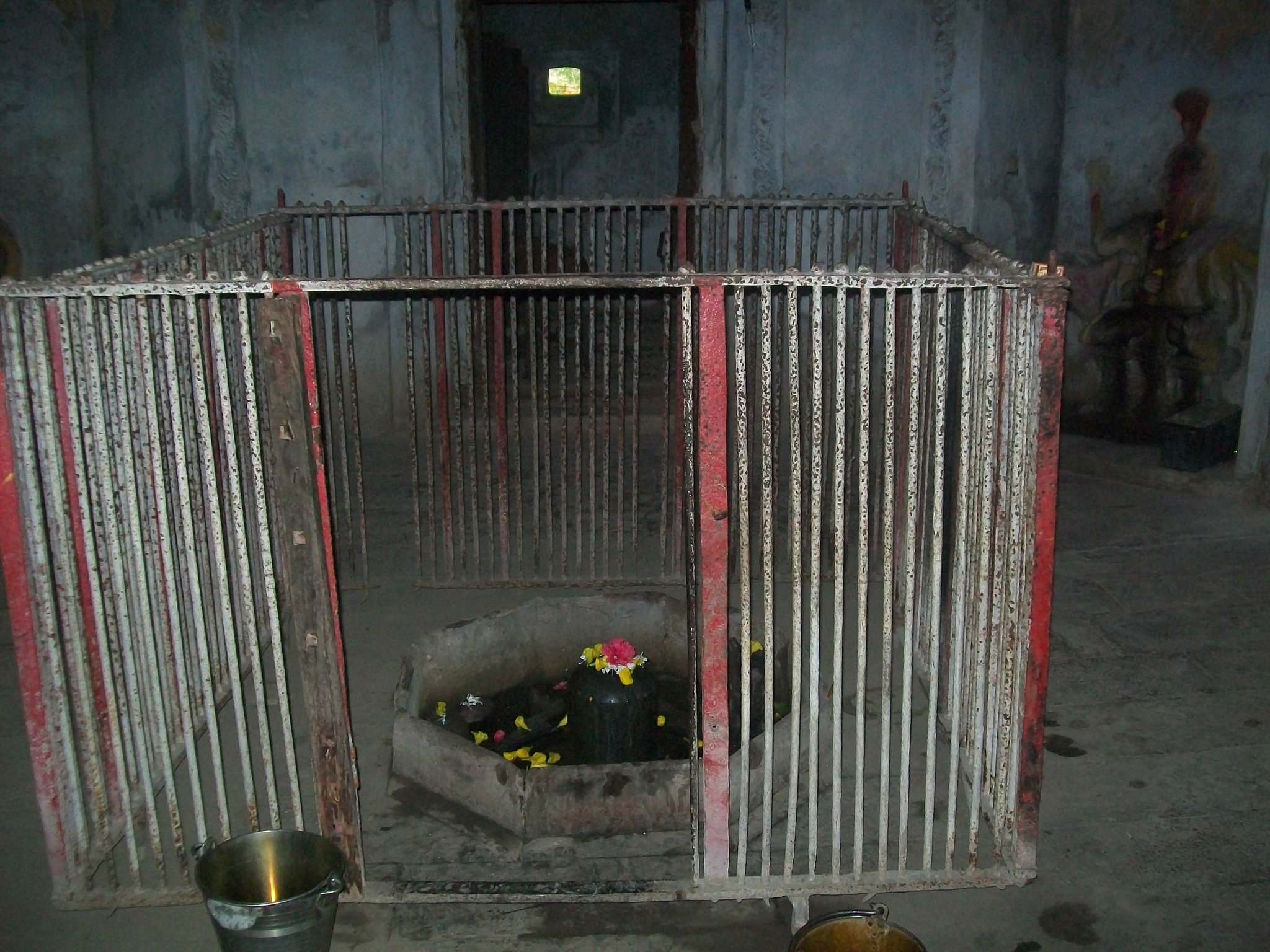
Shivalinga at the temple

== History ==
According to the Kirtishila inscription, the temple was constructed by the King Madhav Singh of Mithila. He started the construction of the temple, an auditorium to facilitate the people coming from outside to attend marriage assembly, huge Dharamshala around the temple and a large pond in the northeast corner of the temple. The construction was completed during the period (1832 AD - 1833 AD) of the King Chhatra Singh.

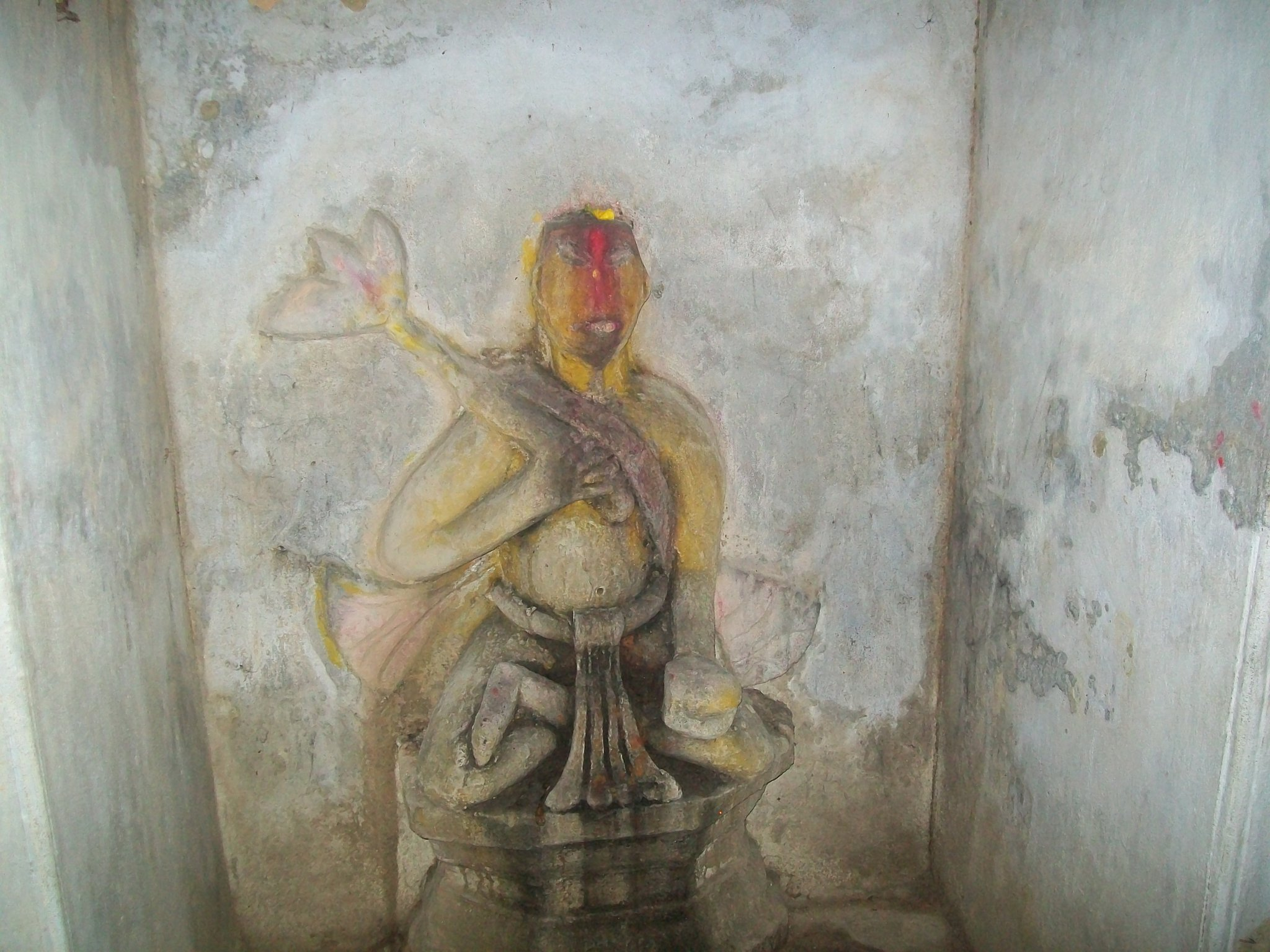
Figure of a deity carved on the wall of the temple.

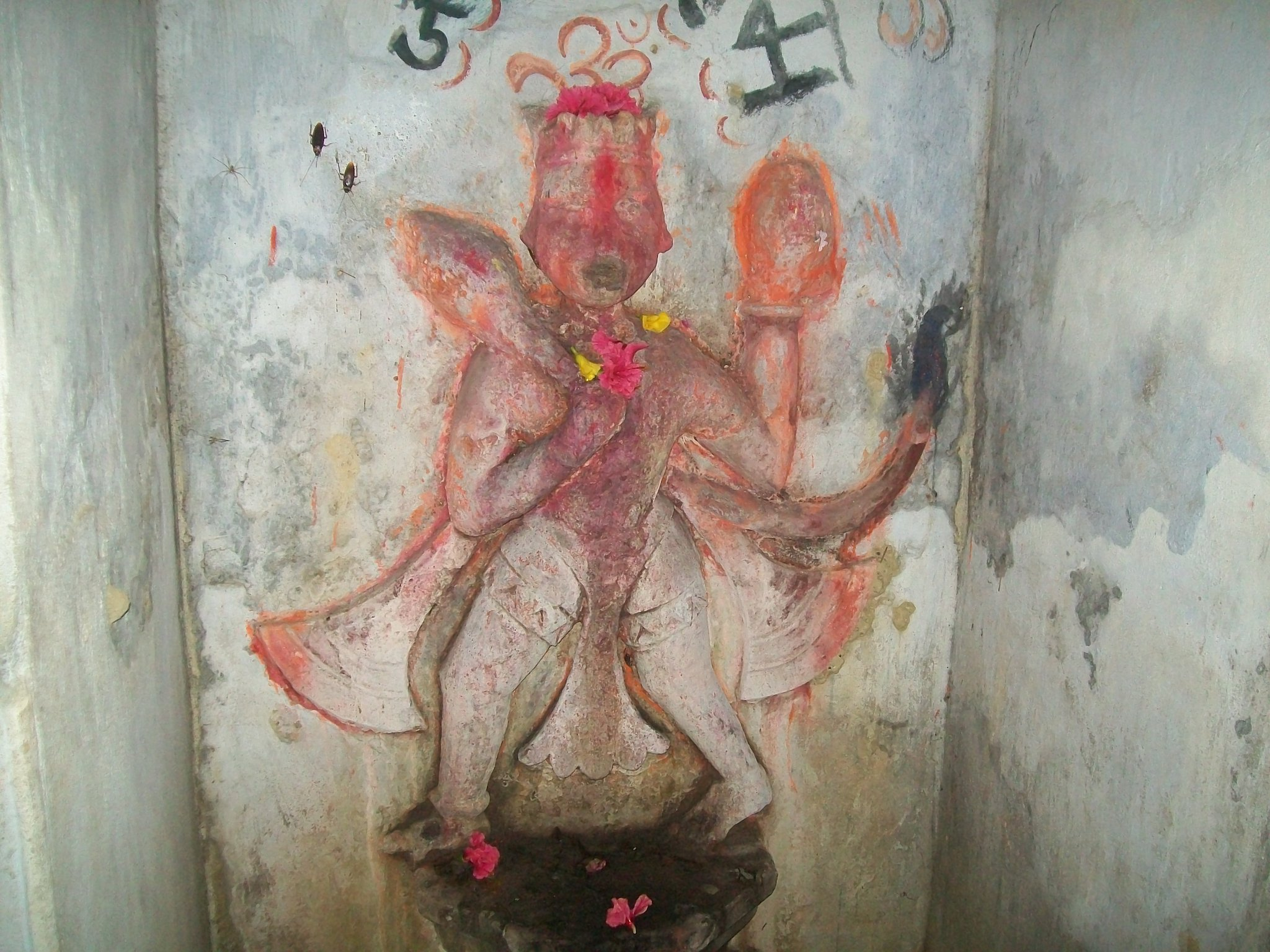
Image of Lord Hanuman on the wall

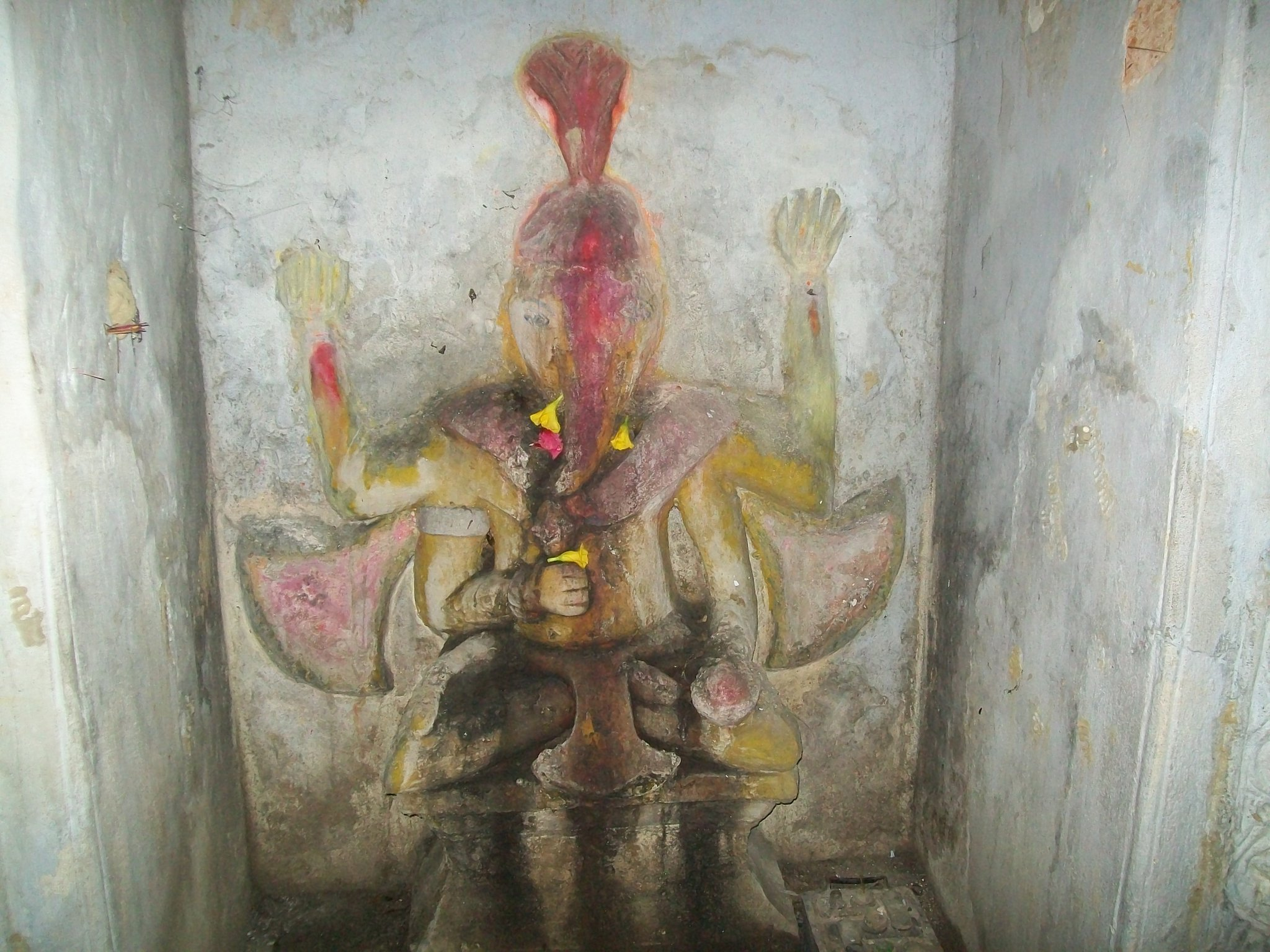
Lord Ganesha

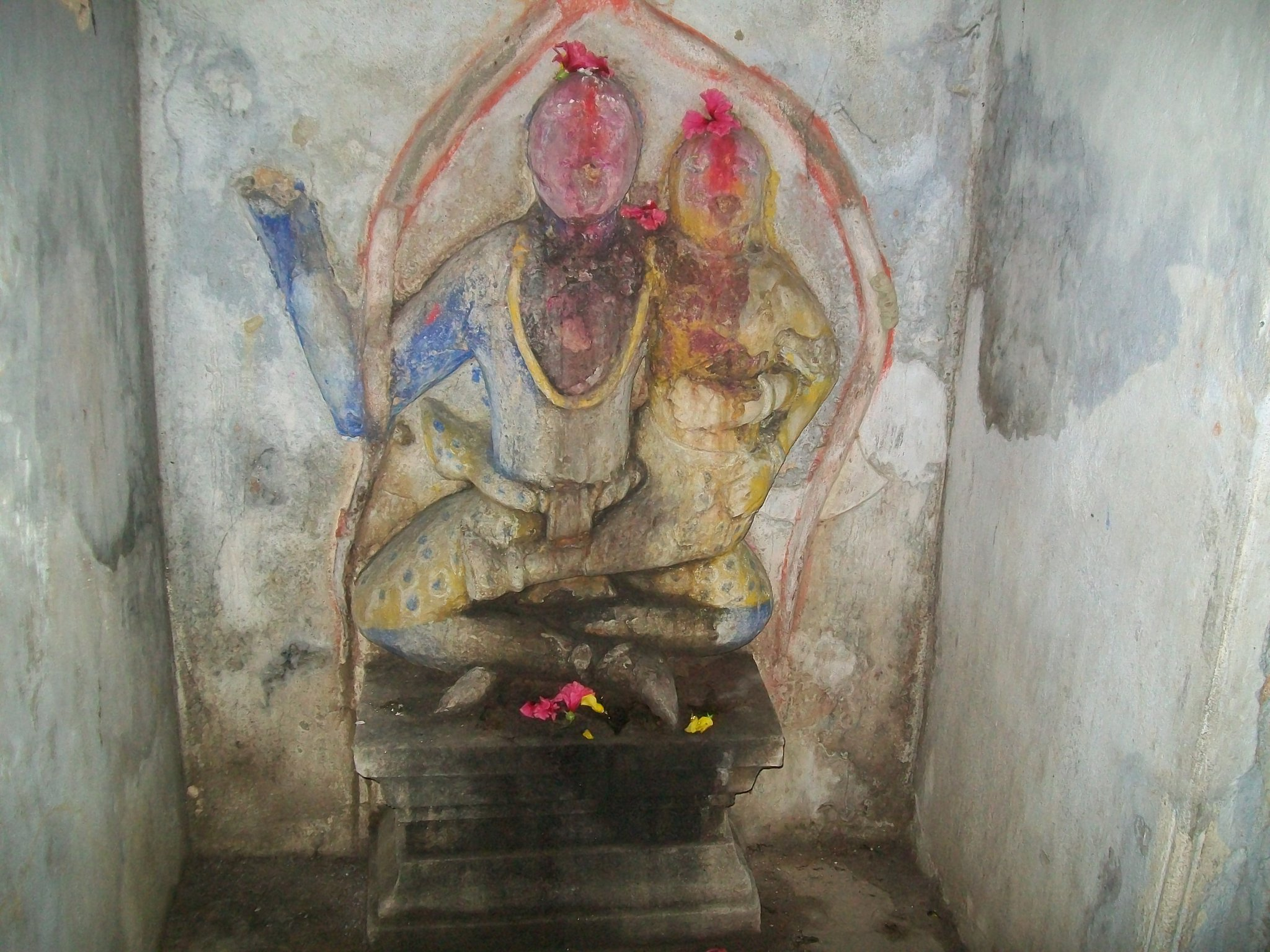
Lord Shiva
