= Mithila Lalit Sangrahalaya =

Cultural heritage museum in Mithila

Coordinates: 26°23′24″N 86°02′28″E

- मिथिला ललित संग्रहालय
- Former name: Mithila Lalit Sangrahalaya Sah Shodh Sansthan (English translation: Mithila Lalit Museum cum Research Institute)
- Established: 1975
- Location: Saurath village, Madhubani
- Type: Culture and art museum
- Founder: Villagers of Saurath
- Owner: Government of Bihar

Mithila Lalit Sangrahalaya (Maithili: मिथिला ललित संग्रहालय) is a museum at Saurath village near the outskirts of the Madhubani city in the Mithila region of Bihar in India. It is also known as Mithila Lalit Sangrahalaya Sah Shodh Sansthan that translates to Mithila Lalit Museum cum Research Institute. It was established in the year 1975 by the corporation of the local people in the village. It is a government museum. It holds several rare manuscripts, antiquity and artworks related to the cultural heritage of the Mithila region.

== History ==
The Mithila Lalit Sangrahalaya was established by the efforts of the local residents at Saurath village in 1975. Initially, it was a two-room museum. In 1982, it was acquired by the Department of Art, Culture and Youth Development of the Bihar Government in India. In the year 2019, the Chief Minister Nitish Kumar laid the foundation stone of the new building of the museum.
