= Viji Purusha =

Earliest known ancestor in Maithili Brahmins

Viji Purusha also called as Biji Purusha refers to the earliest known ancestor of a lineage in the Maithil Brahmins community of the Mithila region in the Indian subcontinent. It is the foundational root of the Vamsha Vriksha (family tree) of a Maithil Brahmin family recorded in the Panjis system of Mithila. It is also known as apical ancestor. It is recorded by a Panjikar in the region. The village where the Viji Purusha lived in the Mithila region is known as mool. All Maithil Brahmins having common Viji Purusha, belong to a same gotra.

== Etymology ==
Viji Purusha is Maithili word having meaning "primal individual". The term Viji is derived from the Sanskrit term bīja which translates to seed. Similarly the Sanskrit term purūṣa translates to man. Thus the literal meaning of the compound form as per the Sanskrit-English Dictionary of Monier-Williams is "the progenitor of a tribe or family".

== Description ==
The Viji Purusha is also known as Adi Purusha. A Viji Purusha of a mool is the founder and known progenitor of that particular mool. He is also known as the original man of the mool. According to the genealogical record of the Panjis system in Mithila, the Viji Purusha of the great Maithil poet Vidyapati was Vishnu Thakur. Similarly the Viji Purusha of the mool gram Anariye Lagunia of the Shandilya gotra was Sachidev Jha.

The concept of recording Viji Purusha in the Panjis system of Mithila was introduced during the period of the King Harisimhadeva in the Karnat dynasty of Mithila.
