= Maithil Karna Kayastha =

Regions with significant populations
- India: 785,771
- Nepal: 33,502

Languages
- Maithili

Religion
- Hinduism

Related ethnic groups
- Other Kayastha groups

Maithil Karna Kayastha, Maithili Kayastha or Karna Kayastha is a Maithil Hindu caste that originated from the Mithila, and is one of the twelve subgroups of Kayastha. They are predominantly found in the Indian subcontinent, which includes modern-day India and Nepal. The majority population resides in North Bihar in India, Terai (Madhesh and Koshi) in Nepal.

The Maithil Karna Kayastha have historically been involved in administration, governance, and record-keeping. They have been granted Forward caste status in the state of Bihar, along with Maithil Brahmin, Rajput, and Bhumihar. In Nepal, they are classified as Madheshi upper class caste, and counted under Minority groups. The main language spoken by Maithil Kayastha is Maithili.

== History ==
The Maithil Karna Kayastha of present-day North Bihar and Terai region in Nepal claims Kashtriya varna status, after a decision ruled by Patna High Court in 1927. According to the Hindu texts and traditions, they are descended from a Hindu god, Chitragupta, who is responsible for writing down human deeds. The early written record shows that they came from South India along with Karnat king, Nanyadeva (r. 1097 to 1147 CE) to Simraungadh.

During the reign of Karnat king, Gangadeva, the Maithil Kayastha were spread into different rural settlements of Mithila, present day Darbhanga and Madhubani. The last king of the Karnata dynasty was Harisimhadeva, who introduced the Panji system in 1327 CE amongst Maithil Brahmin and Karna Kayastha to maintain the genealogical records. The Kayastha were served as Tehsildar (transl. "Revenue collector"), Patwari (transl. "Recordkeeper"), Amin (transl. "Land surveyor"), and Dewan (transl. "Accountant") during the British Raj, and Raj Darbhanga time period.

In the Modern era, the Maithil Kayastha were among the most literate, urbanized, and mobile caste of Bihar and Nepal. They played a leading role in the separation of Bihar from Bengal presidency, actively participated in Champaran Satyagraha and controlled the leadership of the Bihar Congress in the pre-independent era.

== Demography ==
According to 2022 Caste-based survey, the Karna Kayastha population was 785,771 in Bihar and 33,502 in the 2021 Nepal census.

== Language and Writing system ==
The main language spoken by Karna Kayastha is Maithili. This caste used Kaithi, a historical Brahmic script, in writing, record-keeping and administration during the Mughal period. The script derives its name from the word "Kayastha". In recent times, the script has only been used for religious purposes.

== Panji Prabandh ==
Panji Prabandh are extensive genealogical records maintained among Maithili Kayastha and Maithil Brahmins. It is important to obtain the "Aswajan" (transl. "Non relative") certificate between the bride and groom to perform Maithil Vivah.
