= Mool (lineage) =

Genealogical identity of Maithil Brahmin

मूल
- Ancestral lineage of Maithil Brahmin

Classification
- Geneological identity in Gotra; Subordinate to the Gotra; Patrilineal identification

Mithila Region
- Root origin: Viji Purush

Institution
- Maintained by: Panjikars
- Recorded in: Panjis
- Matrimonial Nature: Endogamous

Mool (Maithili: मूल) also known as mūla refers to the root or origin of a group of Maithil Brahmins in the Mithila region of the Indian subcontinent. It indicates the ancestral lineage and the original place of dwelling of a particular clan. It signifies a common ancestral origin, often tracing back to a shared forefather. It is a patrilineal identification and a fundamental genealogical parameter recorded in the Panji system of the Maithil Brahmin in Mithila. Panjikars are the authorised persons responsible for keeping the records of the mools of each individual in the region.

== History ==
In the 14th century CE, the community Maithil Brahmins were classified into four sub - classes. They are Shrotriya (Soit), Yogya (Bhalmanush), Panjibadh and Jaiwar. The concept of mools among the Maithil Brahmins was introduced after the formation of these four sub - classes. The history of the origin of the concept of the mool can be traced since the regime of the Karnat King Harisimhadeva in Mithila. The record of the names of the mūla of all the Maithil Brahmins was initiated by the order of the King Harisimhadeva at his court, during a conference held for the classification of the Maithil Brahmins community. Harisimhadeva was the last king of the Karnat dynasty in Mithila. He started the Panji system in Mithila for keeping genealogical records of the Maithil Brahmins.

== Classification ==
The mool in the Maithil Brahmins is further classified into three classes of hierarchical orders. They are Atyant Shrestha, Dwitiya Shreni and Madhyammul. The Atyant Shrestha is considered as the first class mool. The mools of this class are Kharauray, Khauaray, Budhbaray, Mararay, Dariharay, Ghusautay, Tisautay, Karamhay, Naraunay, Vbhaniyamay, Hariyamme, Sarisavay and Sodarpuriye, etc. Similarly Dwitiya Shreni are the second class mool. The mools of the second class are Gangaulivaar, Pavaulivaar, Kujaulivaar, Alevaar, Vahirvaar, Sakrivaar, Palivaar, Visevaar, Fanevaar, Uchitvaar, Pandul-vaar, Kataivaar and Tilaivaar, etc. Similarly the third class mool is Madhyammul. The mools of the third class are Dighve, Belauche, Ekahre, Panchobhe, Valiyase, Jajiwal, Takwaal and Panduye, etc.

== Description ==
According to the scholar Carolyn Henning Brown of Whitman College, the Mool is a spatial identity. It is a historical place related to the factual agnatic line descending from a known founder called as Viji Purush. It is known by the village of residence of the ancestral founding father known as Viji Purush. Indian scholar Abhaya Nath Mishra in his literary work Shrotriyas of Mithila mentioned that initially there were about 200 mools of the Maithil Brahmins but later many of them became extinct.

In the tradition of Maithil Brahmins, mool is a subordinate to the gotra of a Maithil Brahmin. Furthermore, all mools belonging to a particular gotra are known as Sagotra. While the gotra is exogamous, the mool is endogamous among the community of Maithil Brahmins.
