= Maithil Vivah =

Traditional marriage system in Mithila

- Traditional Arrange Marriage
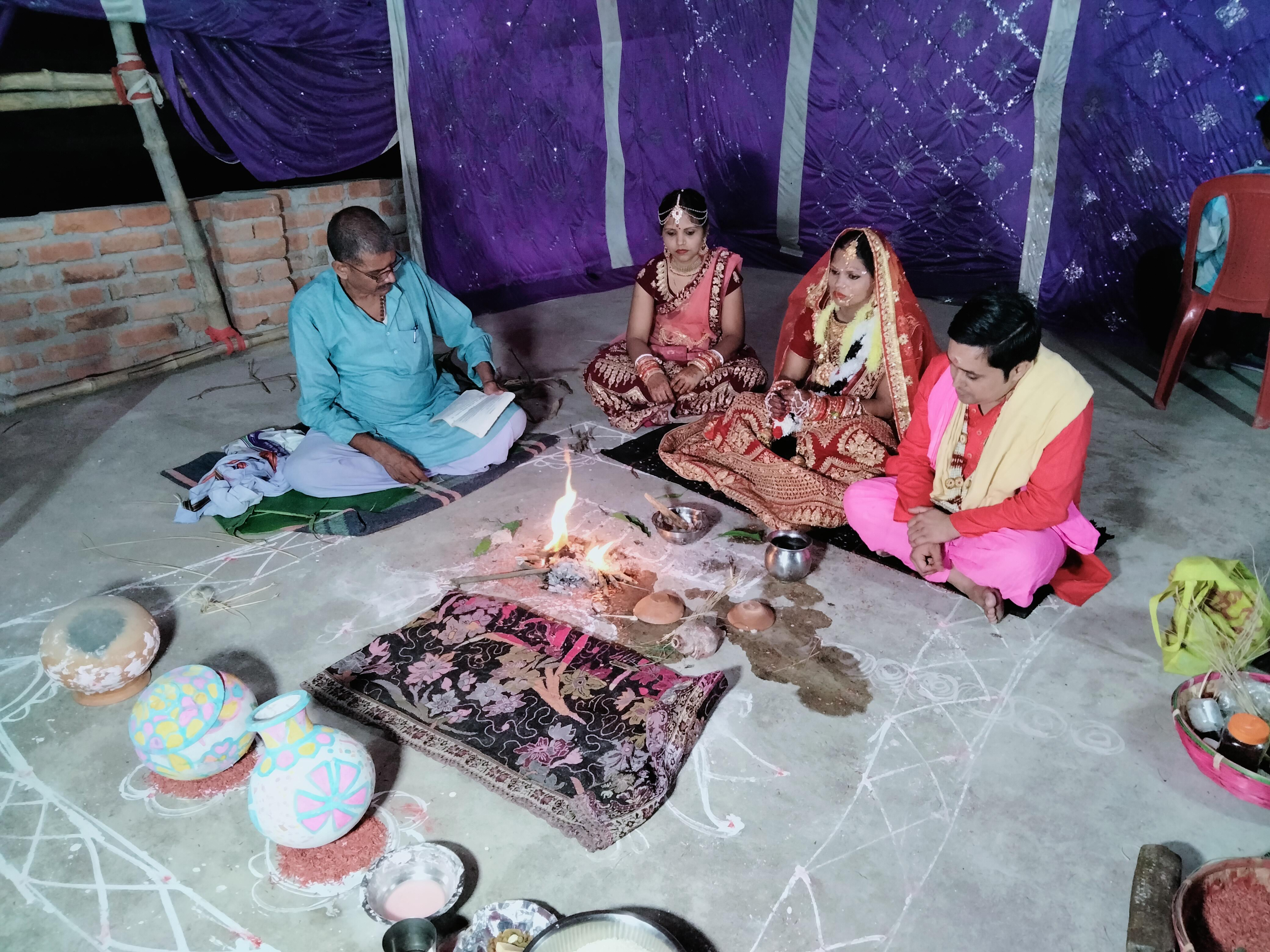
- View of a Maithil Vivah ritual at night. A Panditji is chanting Vedic mantras for the rituals. At the left side of the bride, the bidhakari of the bride is looking after the rituals.
- Country: India and Nepal
- Current region: Indian subcontinent
- Origin: Mithila region
- Members: Maithil bride and groom
- Traditions: Hinduism

Maithil Vivah is a tradition of marriage between Maithil man and woman in the Mithila region of the Indian subcontinent. In the region of Mithila, vivah (marriage) is generally considered mandatory for every individual among the Maithil Hindus. It is believed that birth of a son alone paves the way to salvation (Moksha). Manu regards this as an integral part of the social order that ensures adherence to established norms.

The Maithil Vivah is endogamous for caste (community or Varna) but exogamous for gotra and pravara. The Maithil marriage codes are guided by the Mitakshara school of Hindu Laws. The legal principles of the Maithil Vivah comes under the jurisdiction of the Mithila school of Hindu Law. They are guided by the authorities of the Mithila school of thought in the Hindu Law.

== Description ==
In the tradition of Maithil Vivah, marriage is an institution through which a man and a woman enter into family life. It is the parmanent institution between the married couples in the Maithil community. It is based on the traditional system of marriage in Hinduism. The major sources of the processes of the Maithil Vivah are the Mantras of the Vedic scriptures. In the Mithila region, there is a separate literature text dedicated to the Maithil Vivah. The literary text is known as Shree Maithili Vivah Padavali. Similarly, the astronomical text Atīcārādinirṇayaḥ composed by the King Mahamahopadhyaya Mahesha Thakura, is considered as an authority text on finding auspicious time for the marriages.

Maithil Vivah is an arranged marriage system in the subcontinent. The bride and groom in the Maithil Vivah system are able to understand each other only during the marriage rituals. The institution or system of the Maithil Vivah is conservative which helps the married couple in making the strong marriage life forever.

In the tradition of Maithil Vivah, a Ghatak who is basically mediator between parents of bride and groom, plays an important role in finding groom for a bride. The process of finding groom for a bride and arranging marriage between them is called Ghatkaiti (Romanised: Ghaṭakaitī) in the Mithila region of the subcontinent.

There are some special traditions in the process of Maithil Vivah, which are not generally seen in other parts of the subcontinent in Hinduism. For example when the groom arrives at the bride's door, he has to change his some clothes in front of everyone to examine that whether the groom has any physical defect or not. Similarly Aam-Mahu Vivah ( special marriage between a mango and mahua tree) procedure in the village of the bride before the arrival of the groom and his processions at the door of the bride. At bride's home a bidhkari is assigned to the bride who helps in performing the rituals of the marriage. An experienced woman from the family or relatives of the bride who is responsible for getting all the rituals done is called Bidhakari.

== Procedures in marriage ==
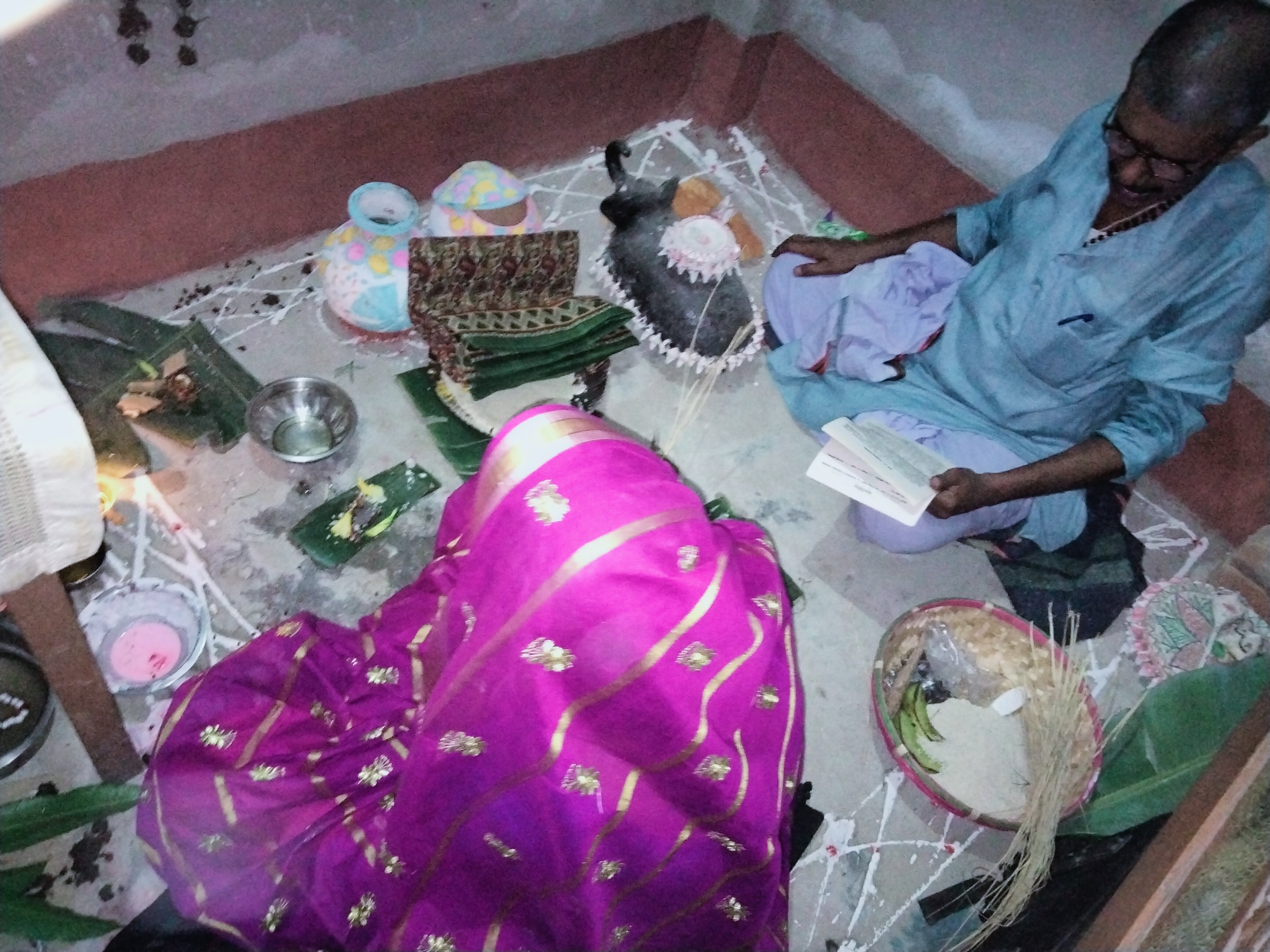
Matrika Puja at Kohabar Ghar by bride's mother.

The procedure of the marriage in the tradition of the Maithil Vivah starts with Parichhan. During the Parichhan, the groom is asked some practical questions related to the domestic life by the Bidhkari and some ladies relatives of the bride. During the procedure, some Maithili folk Parichhan Geet are also sung by the ladies. After the Parichhan process, the groom is taken into Kohabar Ghar. The Kohabar Ghar is a special room in the house of the bride where Kuldevata is established and the rituals of the marriage is performed. It is decorated with Mithila paintings and arts also known as Madhubani paintings or art. The floor of the Kohabar Ghar is decorated by Aripan paintings. In the Kohabar Ghar, first of all the process of Naina-Jogin is conducted. In the Naina-Jogin process, the bride and sister-in-law are hid under some clothes and the groom has to identify the future wife and the sister-in-law without seeing them. In this process, the groom's discerning eye is tested. Apart from the test, the ladies relatives of the bride take enjoyments from this process.

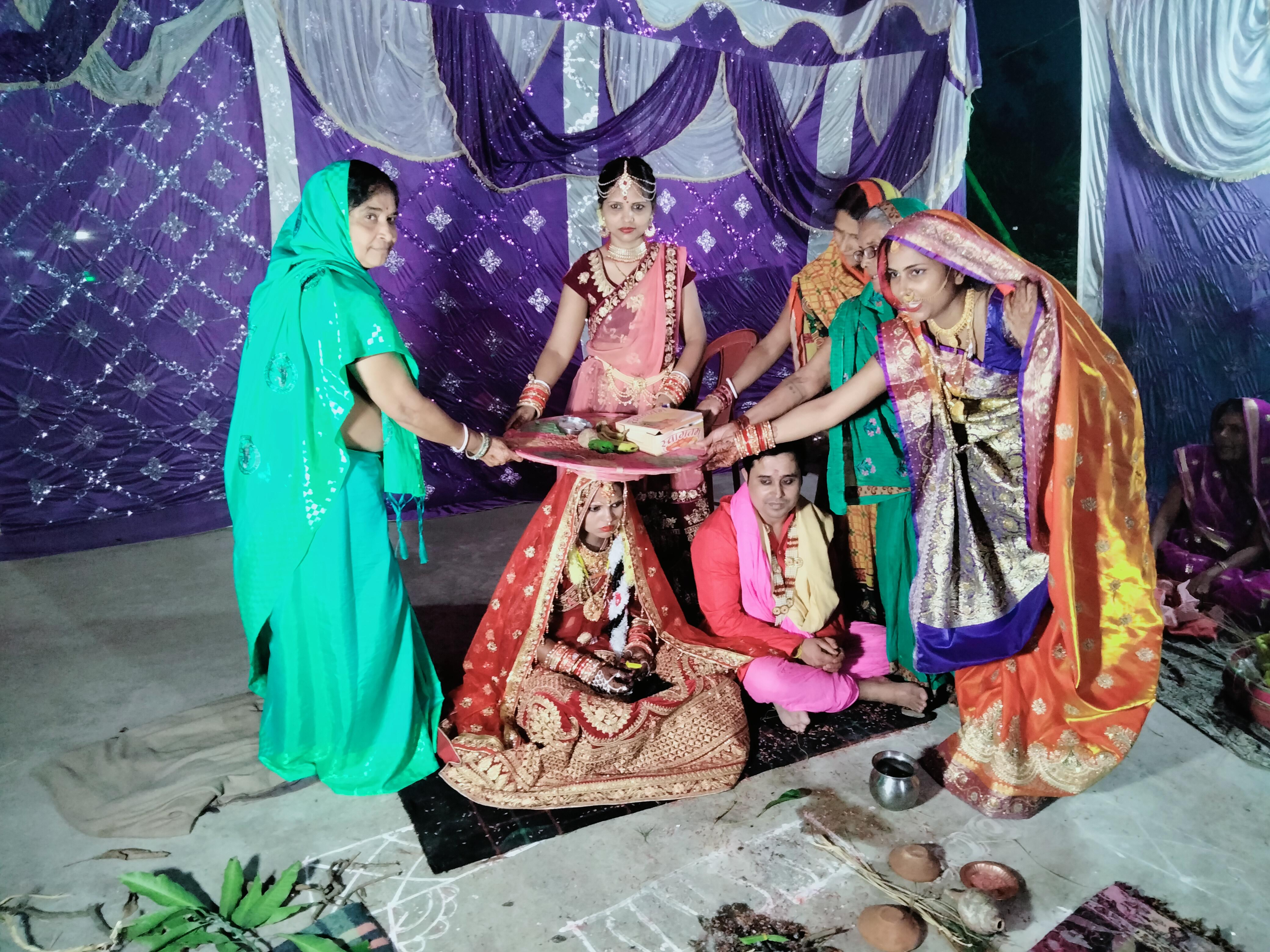
Performance of Chumavan ritual by five women to the married couple.

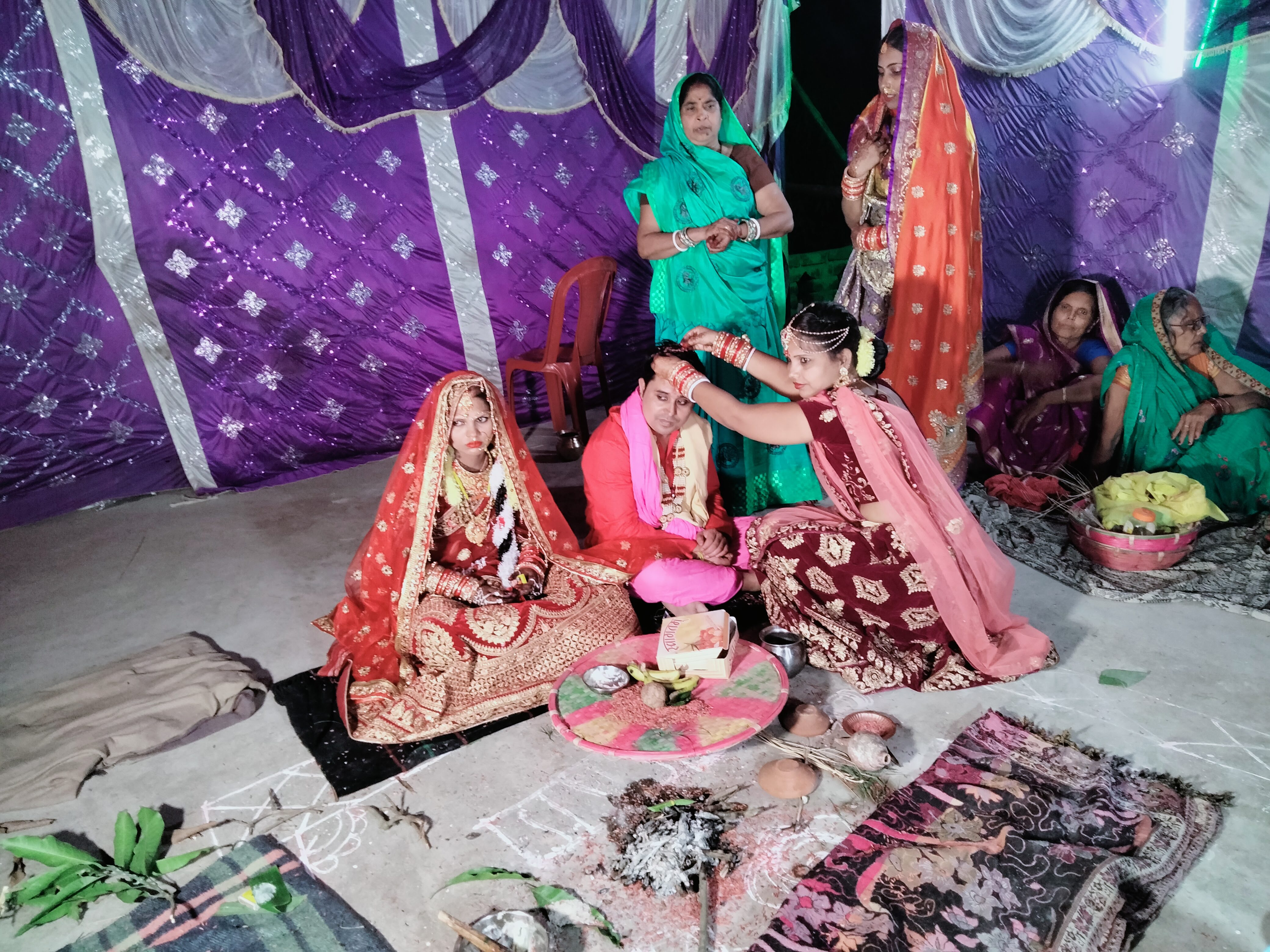
Part of the Chumavan ritual.

During the ritual of Chumavan, five elder married male Brahmins chant the Durwakshata Mantra for blessing of the couple.

== Tradition of Shagun ==
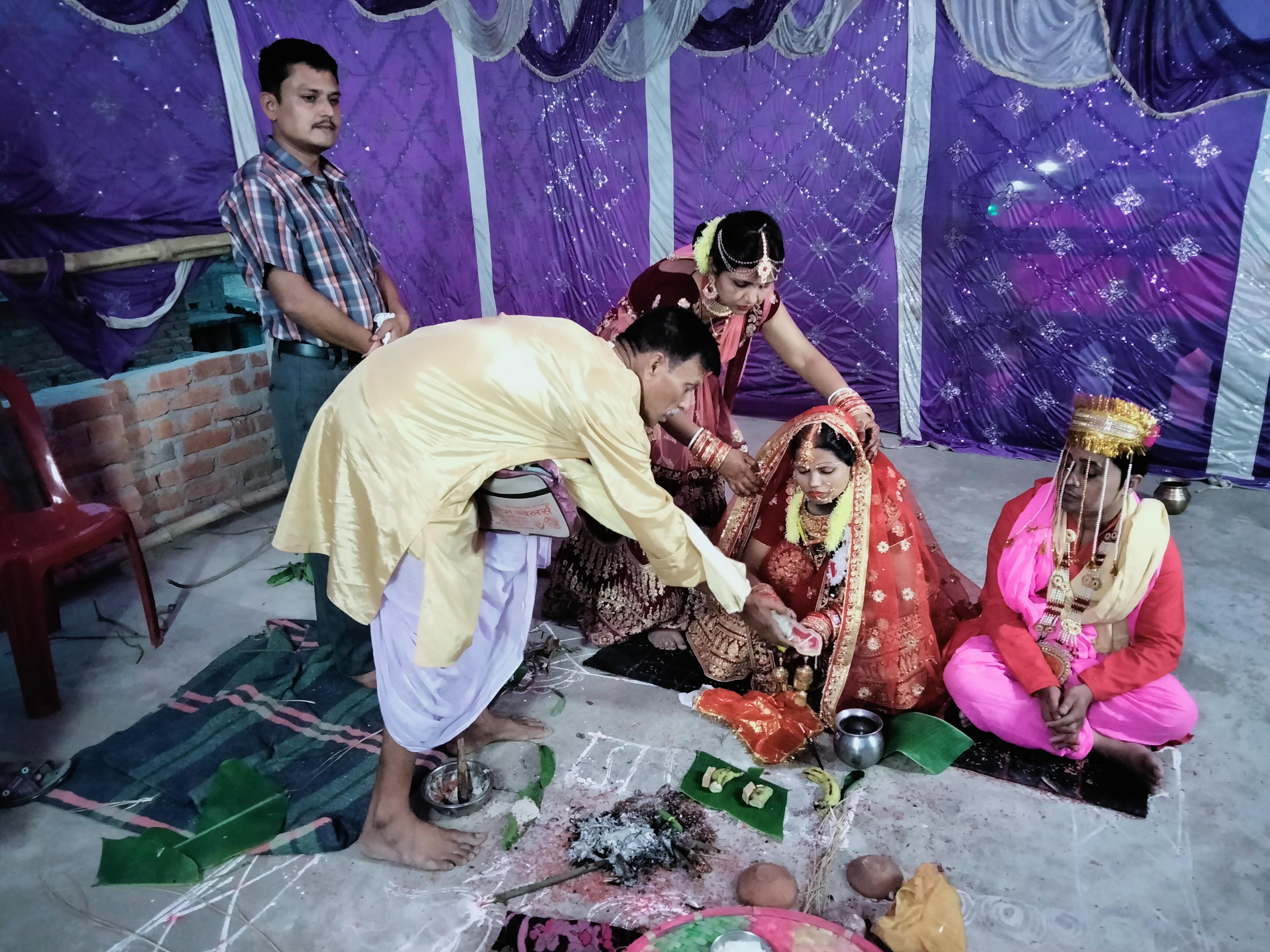
In the image, father-in-law is giving Shagun to the bride.

In Mithila, there is an important tradition of giving shagun after the marriage night. The shagun is a part of the wedding celebration and it also reflects the feeling of love and respect between the families. This tradition usually takes place in the morning, when the newlywed couple takes their first blessings after their marriage. During this, the elderly members of the family and relatives wish blessings to the newlywed couple and give them some precious ornaments or money as gifts. These gifts are called as Shagun in Mithila. Apart from precious ornaments and money, the gift of Shagun also contains red colored bangles, vermilion, kumkum, and fruits, etc.

== Maithil Vivah Vidhi ==
The Maithil marriage is a sacred union characterized by Vedic traditions and unique folk customs (Laukik Vidhi). A traditional Maithil marriage is a multi-day ceremony that is only considered complete after the Chaturthi (fourth-day) rites. The complete ceremony of the Maithil marriage ends with a duragaman ceremony in which the bride departures from her native place (father's home) to the in-laws place (husband's home). It takes place after a lapse of some time convenient to both the families on an auspicious day suggested by a panditji. During the ceremony of the dwiragaman, the women of the bride's place sing some Maithili folk songs called as Samdaun Geet. These songs are dedicated to the emotional feelings between bride and her family, related to the departure of the bride.

=== Key Rituals ===
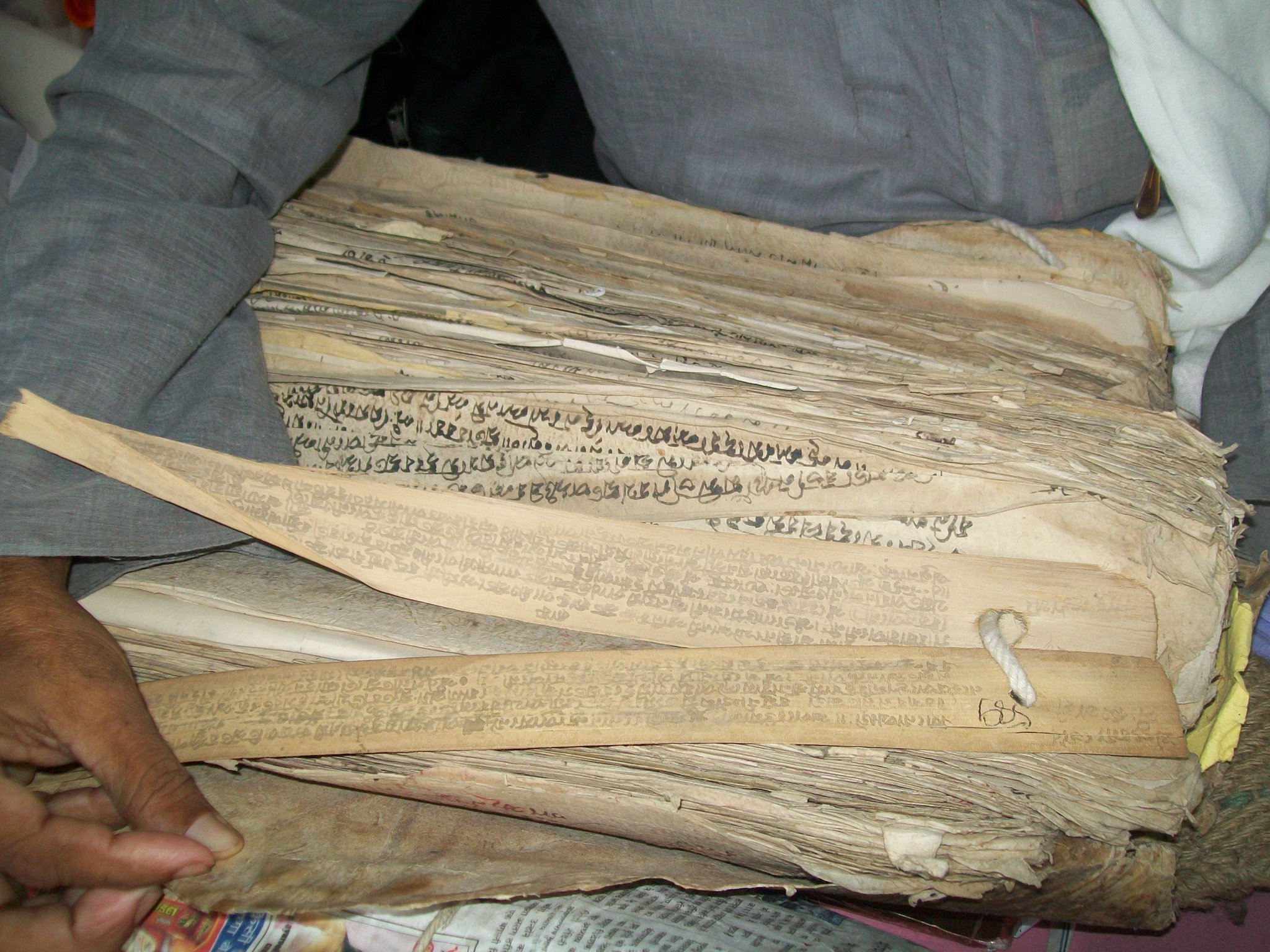
- Some samples of folios in the Panji system of Maithil Brahmins that records genealogical data for the Siddhanta.
  Siddhanta: Genealogical verification by a Panjikar to ensure the bride and groom are not related within prohibited degrees (Sapinda). Among Maithil Brahmins and Maithil Karna Kayastha communities in the Mithila region, there a system of Panji for registration and verification of the genealogical records.
- Sindoor Daan: The groom applies vermilion to the bride's hair parting, marking the core spiritual union.
- Kohbar Ghar: A room decorated with Madhubani paintings where the couple enters after the ceremony.
- Duragaman: Ceremony for the bride departure.

== Associated rituals and festivals ==
Apart from the key rituals of the marriage ceremony, there are other several rituals, ceremonies and festivals, etc associated the tradition of the Maithil Vivah in the whole year of the marriage. Those are Kojagra, Madhushravani, Barsaait, and Phool Lorhi, etc. They are commonly known as Vidh-Vyavhar (rules and mutual custom practices).
