= Panjis =

Genealogical records in Mithila, India

Panji System in Mithila
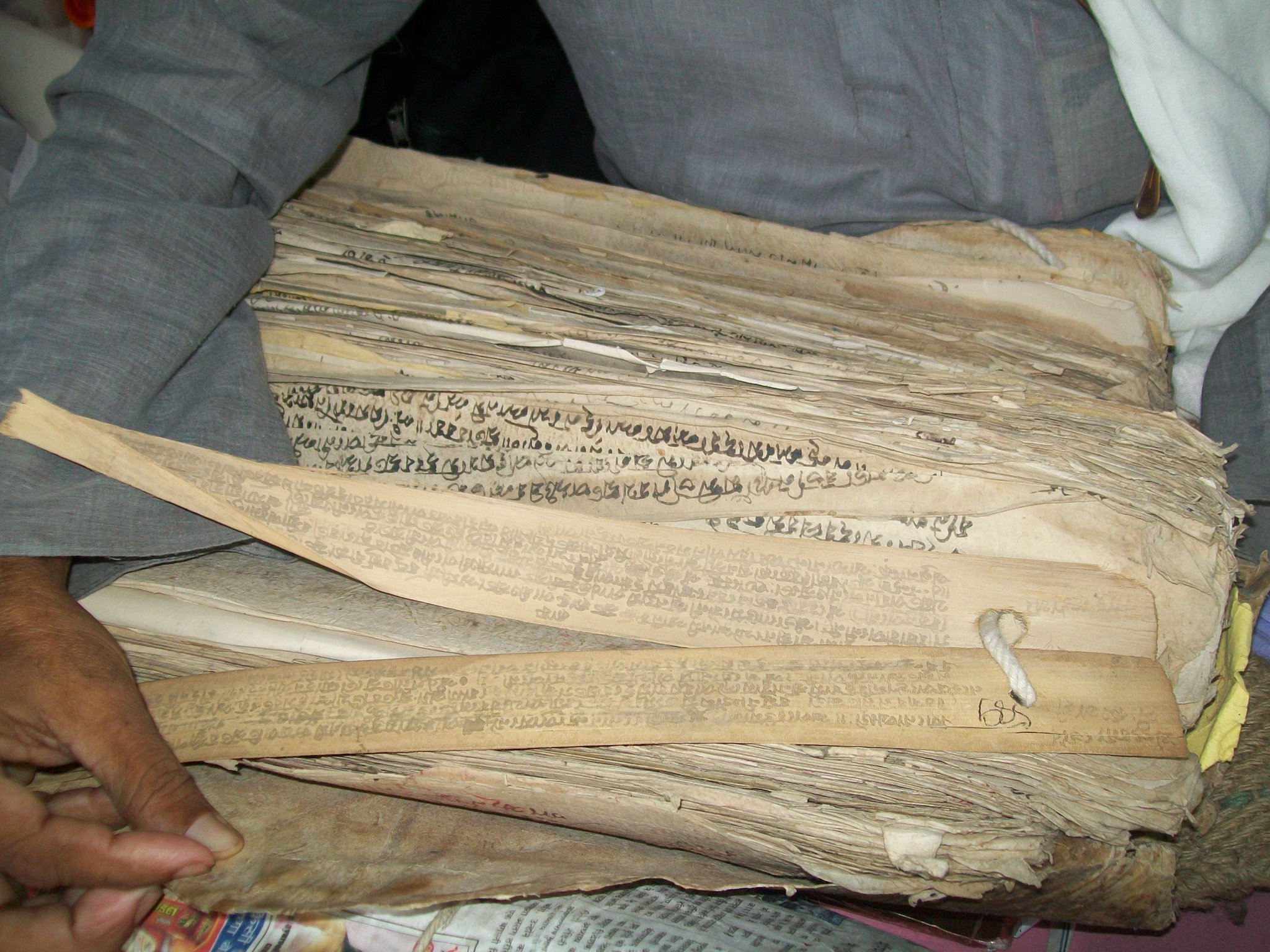
- Genealogical Records in Mithila
- Founded: 1327 AD
- Founder: King Harisimhadeva
- Distributor: Panjikar
- Genre: Genealogical Records in Mithila
- Country of origin: India
- Location: Mithila region

Panjis or Panji Prabandh are extensive genealogical records maintained among the Maithili Kayasthas and Maithili Brahmins of the Mithila region similar to the Hindu genealogy registers at Haridwar.

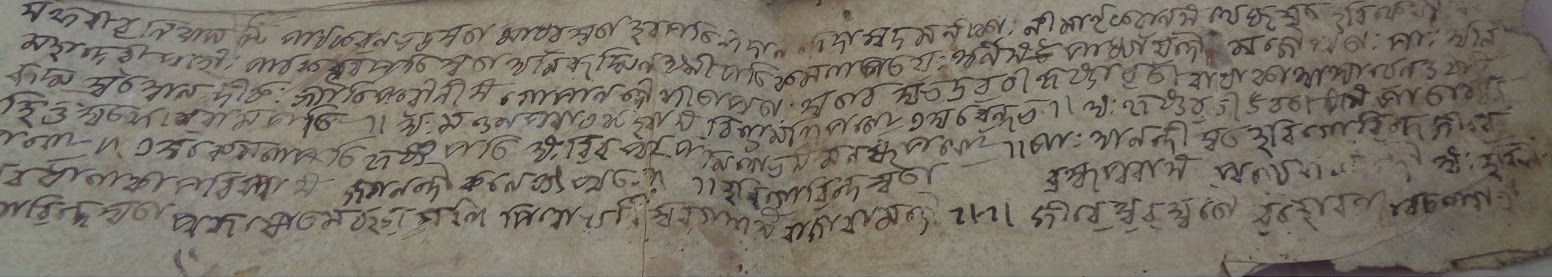
Folio of a panji genealogical record from Saurath Sabha, Madhubani, Bihar

The Panji of an individual person contains information about an individual's ancestors, which reveals their relationship to another person, their connection to a particular lineage, or their membership in a specific social group.

== History ==
It is said that the Panji system was not in use until the second decade of the 14th century CE. Those days people sporadically had lineage introductions. Therefore, marriage decisions in the tradition of Maithil Vivah were based on the remembrance or names of ancestors and Gotra, etc. According to Panjikar Vidyanand Jha alias Mohanji, the Panji system came into existence after a dispute in 1326 AD over the marriage of a minister of the King Harisimha Deva, to the sister of a distant relative. After that the King Harisimha Deva decided to make a genealogy of every person in Mithila so that such a situation does not arise. On the orders of the Maharaja, the Vishwachakra Sammelan was held at Jamsam of Pandaul in Madhubani district. The Panji System was introduced in 1327 AD by the King Harisimha Deva of Karnat Dynasty in Mithila. It was the system of registration of genealogical records of the family. The Panjikar (registrar) was responsible for collecting information about the genealogies of the people in the area and registering it in the register (Panji). It was helpful in identifying the clan or Gotra of a particular family for marriage purpose. The information recorded in the Panjis are Vamsha - Vriksha ( genealogical family tree ), Biji Purush (earliest known ancestor), mool (village of origin of the earliest ancestor), shakhas (village of the diversification of the descendants of the ancestor) and Gotra, etc. The first Panjikar was Gunakar Jha.

== Panjikar ==
During the Darbhanga Raj period, there was a 10 years course of study at the court of Darbhanga Raj to become a Panjikar. A candidate who wished to become a Panjikar, had to enrolled in the course. Then the candidate had to appear in the Dhaut Pariksha. After successfully passing the examination of Dhaut Pariksha, the candidate was given the status of a Panjikar or registrar. It is said that after the end of Darbhanga Raj, the Dhaut Pariksha also ended and after that the selection process of the Panjikar become hereditary.

== Utility ==
The Panjis have enormous value when arranging marriages, as they ensure that incestuous relationships do not occur, delineating the last 07 generations from the paternal side and 06 generations from the maternal side of the prospective bride and groom. When it is proved that there has been no relationship for seven generations, the Panjikar (registrar) grants the marriage. The horoscopes of the couples are also matched based on the Janmpatri (birth chart) and horoscope. This process of registration for the marriage of a couples is popularly called as Siddhanta in Mithila.

== Sabha Gachhi ==
The king Harisimhadeva approved fourteen major locations for organising conferences of marriage alliances in Maithil Brahmins at fourteen different locations in Mithila region. They are Saurath, Khanagadi, Partapur, Sheohar, Govindpur, Fattepur, Sajhaul, Sukhasana, Akhdari, Hemnagar, Balua, Baruali, Samsaul, and Sasaula. The Maithil Kayasthas and Maithil Brahmin delegates assembled in a conference to deliberate upon new marriage alliances duly checked with the respective panjikars at these places. Among these Sabha Gachhis, the Sabha Gachhi near the outskirts of Madhubani city called as Saurath is considered as the oldest and the most popular. The conference itself was called Saurath Sabha. Similarly the Sabha Gachhi of Sasaula village near the city of Sitamarhi is also very popular and is still live. The Sabha Gachhi of Sasaula village is known as Sasaula Sabha Gachhi. .

== Current status ==
Due to progressive loss of Panjis, Panjikars taking up modern professions and increasing cosmopolitan behaviour, the practice of fixation of marriage by consulting Panjis is dying. There have been cases reported of sale of Panjis to foreign agencies . The recent Saurath sabhas are all but deserted . Increasingly, people are looking forward to more modern methods of match making like internet, rather than centuries old palm leaves.

== Digitisation of Panjis ==
Since in the modern era Saurath Sabha is losing the preferences for wedding negotiations place and the next generation of the families of the Panjikars are also not interested in the profession of Panjikars and they are shifting towards other jobs, there was threat to lose the handwritten genealogical records forever. It is said that Mithila region has more than four lakhs manuscripts of the genealogical records of the Maithil Brahmins and Karan Kayasthas. Therefore, in 2017, the National Mission for Manuscripts initiated a mission for the digitisation of the handwritten manuscripts of the Panjis at Saurath Sabha in Mithila region. According to the National Mission for Manuscripts, the officers are facing many difficulties while convincing for digitisation of the handwritten genealogical records.

== Books on Panji System ==
- Maithili Karna Kayasthak Panjik Sarvekshan, by Binod Bihari Verma
- Maithil Brāhamano ki Pañji Vyavasthā (Hindi), by Pt Ramānāth Jhā, published by Granthālaya, Darbhangā.
- Genome Mapping- 450 AD to 2009 AD- Mithilak Panji Prabandh, by Gajendra Thakur, published by Shruti Publication, 2009 Delhi ISBN No.978-81-907729-6-9
- Panji System in Maithil Karna Kayastha: A Sociological Evaluation, [By: Dr. Binod Kumar Karna.]
